= Threatened fauna of Australia =

Animals at risk of becoming extinct

Threatened fauna of Australia are those species and subspecies of birds, fish, frogs, insects, mammals, molluscs, crustaceans, and reptiles to be found in Australia that are in danger of becoming extinct. This article lists species classified as threatened species under the Commonwealth Environment Protection and Biodiversity Conservation Act 1999 (EPBC Act).

== Background ==
Based on the list of Australian animals extinct in the Holocene, about 33 mammals (27 from the mainland, including the thylacine), 24 birds (three from the mainland), one reptile, and three frog species or subspecies are strongly believed to have become extinct in Australia during the Holocene epoch. These figures exclude dubious taxa like the Roper River scrub robin (Drymodes superciliaris colcloughi) and possibly extinct taxa like the Christmas Island shrew (Crocidura trichura).

An online database of threatened mammals launched on 22 April 2020 reported that there had been a decline of more than a third of threatened mammal numbers in the past 20 years, but the data also show that targeted conservation efforts are working. The Threatened Mammal Index "contains population trends for 57 of Australia's threatened or near-threatened terrestrial and marine mammal species".

A study published in Biological Conservation in March 2023 listed 23 species which the authors considered to no longer meet the criteria as threatened species under the EPBC Act. The team, led by John Woinarski of Charles Darwin University, looked at all species listed as threatened under the act in 2000 and 2022. There was one fish (Murray cod) and one reptile (Flinders Ranges worm-lizard) on the list, along with fifteen mammals, eight birds, and four frogs.

== Threatened species legislation ==
The list of species below includes those proclaimed under the Australian federal EPBC Act. The classifications are based on those used by the World Conservation Union (IUCN); however, IUCN and Australian rankings do differ. Each state and territory also has its own legislation relating to environmental protection.

=== Federal legislation ===
Environment Protection and Biodiversity Conservation Act 1999 (Cth) and Regulations set up a framework for protection of the Australian environment, including its biodiversity and its natural and culturally significant places.

=== State legislation ===
Threatened species in Australia are protected by, or affected by, four main types of legislation:

- Protected areas legislation (e.g., National Parks and Wildlife Act 1974 (NSW))
- Threatened species legislation (e.g. Threatened Species Conservation Act 1995 (NSW), Threatened Species Protection Act 1995 (Tas))
- Native vegetation conservation laws
- Fisheries legislation

== List of species ==
=== Extinct in the wild ===
One fish is listed as extinct in the wild.

- Pedder galaxias, Galaxias pedderensis

=== Critically endangered ===
Five mammals, six birds, two reptiles, three fish and five other species are listed as critically endangered.

==== Invertebrates ====
- Amphipod crustacean Austrogammarus australis
- Freshwater snail Beddomeia tumida
- Boggomoss snail, Dawson Valley snail, Adclarkia dawsonensis
- Margaret River hairy marron, Cherax tenuimanus
- Lord Howe Island stick insect, Dryococelus australis
- Golden sun moth, Synemon plana
- Mitchell's rainforest snail, Thersites mitchellae

==== Fish ====
- Grey nurse shark, Carcharias taurus - east coast population
- Western trout minnow, western trout galaxias, Galaxias truttaceus hesperius
- Speartooth shark, Glyphis glyphis
- Opal cling goby, Stiphodon semoni

==== Reptiles ====
- Western swamp tortoise, Pseudemydura umbrina
- Leathery turtle, leatherback turtle, luth, Dermochelys coriacea

==== Birds ====
- Scrubtit (King Island subspecies), Acanthornis magnus greenianus
- Spotted quail-thrush (Mt Lofty Ranges subspecies), Cinclosoma punctatum anachoreta
- Yellow chat (Dawson subspecies), Epthianura crocea macgregori
- Orange-bellied parrot, Neophema chrysogaster
- Round Island petrel, Pterodroma arminjoniana
- Herald petrel, Pterodroma heraldica

==== Mammals ====
- Gilbert's potoroo, Potorous gilbertii
- Bare-rumped sheathtail bat, Saccolaimus saccolaimus nudicluniatus
- Southern bent-wing bat, Miniopterus schreibersii bassanii
- Leadbeater's possum, Gymnobelideus leadbeateri

=== Endangered ===
Thirty-four mammals, thirty-eight birds, eleven reptiles, eighteen frogs, sixteen fishes and eleven other species are listed as endangered.

==== Invertebrates ====
- Desert sand-skipper, aestiva skipper, Croitana aestiva
- Central North burrowing crayfish, Engaeus granulatus
- Tasmanian giant freshwater crayfish, Astacopsis gouldi
- Furneaux burrowing crayfish, Engaeus martigener
- Scottsdale burrowing crayfish, Engaeus spinicaudatus
- Gove crow butterfly, Euploea alcathoe enastri
- Broad-toothed stag beetle, Wielangta stag beetle, Lissotes latidens
- Freshwater snail, Beddomeia capensis
- Land snail Mesodontrachia fitzroyana
- Lord Howe placostylus, Lord Howe flax snail, Placostylus bivaricosus
- Land snail Semotrachia euzyga
- Land snail Sinumelon bednalli
- Moth Phyllodes imperialis (southern subspecies)

==== Fish ====
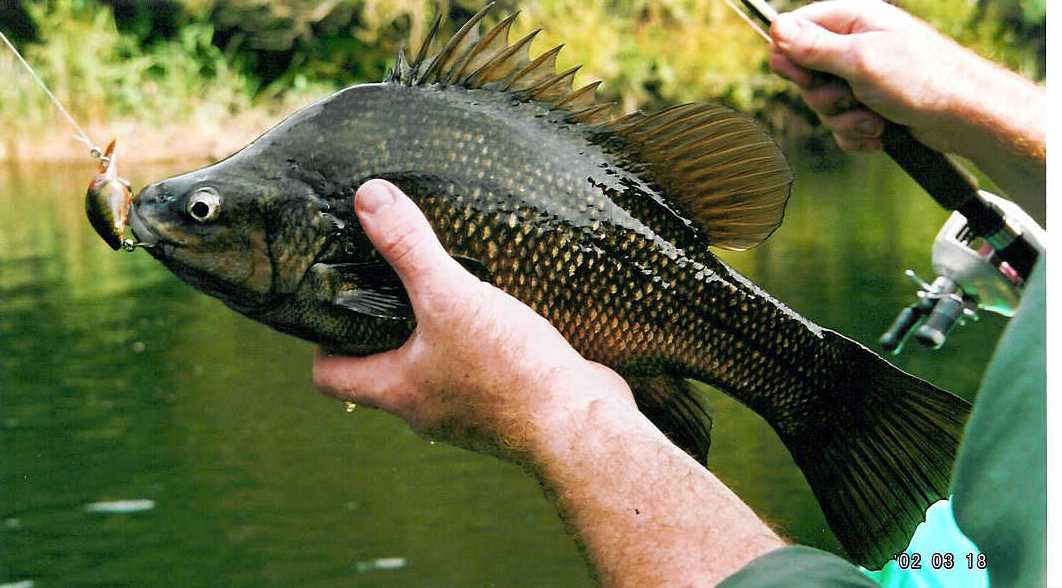
This exceptionally large Macquarie perch was caught on a lure (visible in the picture) and was carefully released.

- Spotted handfish, spotted-hand fish, Brachionichthys hirsutus
- Elizabeth Springs goby, Chlamydogobius micropterus
- Golden galaxias, Galaxias auratus
- Swan galaxias, Galaxias fontanus
- Barred galaxias, Galaxias fuscus
- Clarence galaxias, Galaxias johnstoni
- Northern river shark, New Guinea river shark, Glyphis garricki
- Clarence River cod, eastern freshwater cod, Maccullochella ikei
- Trout cod, Maccullochella macquariensis
- Mary River cod, Maccullochella peelii mariensis
- Macquarie perch, Macquaria australasica
- Lake Eacham rainbowfish, Melanotaenia eachamensis
- Oxleyan pygmy perch, Nannoperca oxleyana
- Arthurs paragalaxias, Paragalaxias mesotes
- Maugean skate, Port Davey skate, Zearaja maugeana
- Redfin blue-eye, Scaturiginichthys vermeilipinnis

==== Amphibians ====
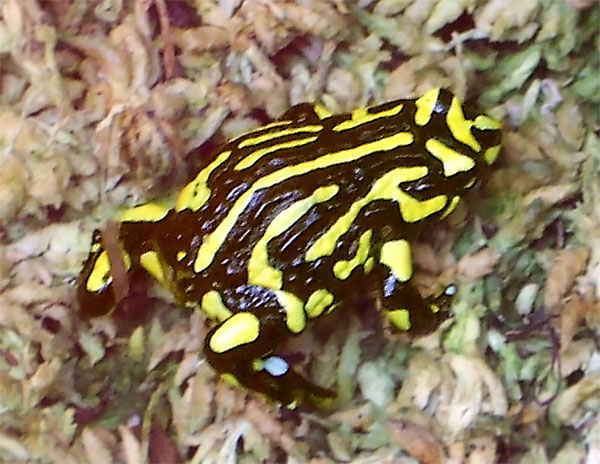
Southern corroboree frog

- White-bellied frog, creek frog, Geocrinia alba
- Yellow-spotted tree frog, yellow-spotted bell frog, Litoria castanea
- Armoured mistfrog, Litoria lorica
- Waterfall frog, torrent tree frog, Litoria nannotis
- Mountain mistfrog, Litoria nyakalensis
- Spotted tree frog, Litoria spenceri
- Fleay's frog, Mixophyes fleayi
- Southern barred frog, giant barred frog, Mixophyes iteratus
- Lace-eyed tree frog, Australian lace-lid, Nyctimystes dayi
- Baw Baw frog, Philoria frosti
- Southern corroboree frog, Pseudophryne corroboree
- Sunset frog, Spicospina flammocaerulea
- Eungella day frog, Taudactylus eungellensis
- Tinkling frog, Taudactylus rheophilus
- Booroolong frog, Litoria booroolongensis

==== Reptiles ====
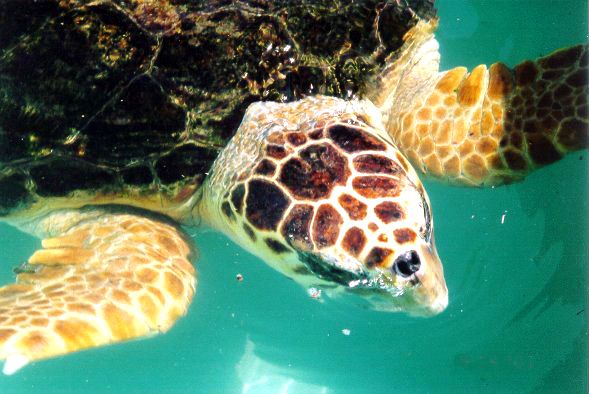
Loggerhead turtle

- Loggerhead turtle, Caretta caretta
- Yellow-snouted ground gecko, Diplodactylus occultus
- Arnhem Land Gorges skink, Bellatorias obiri
- Slater's skink, floodplain skink, Egernia slateri slateri
- Western spiny-tailed skink, Egernia stokesii badia
- Gulf snapping turtle, Elusor lavarackorum
- Mary River tortoise, Elusor macrurus
- Blue Mountains water skink, Eulamprus leuraensis
- Corangamite water skink, Eulamprus tympanum marnieae
- Pacific ridley, olive ridley, Lepidochelys olivacea
- Allan's lerista, retro slider, Lerista allanae
- Pygmy blue-tongue lizard, Adelaide blue-tongue lizard, Tiliqua adelaidensis
- Grassland earless dragon, Tympanocryptis lineata pinguicolla
- Mary River turtle

==== Birds ====
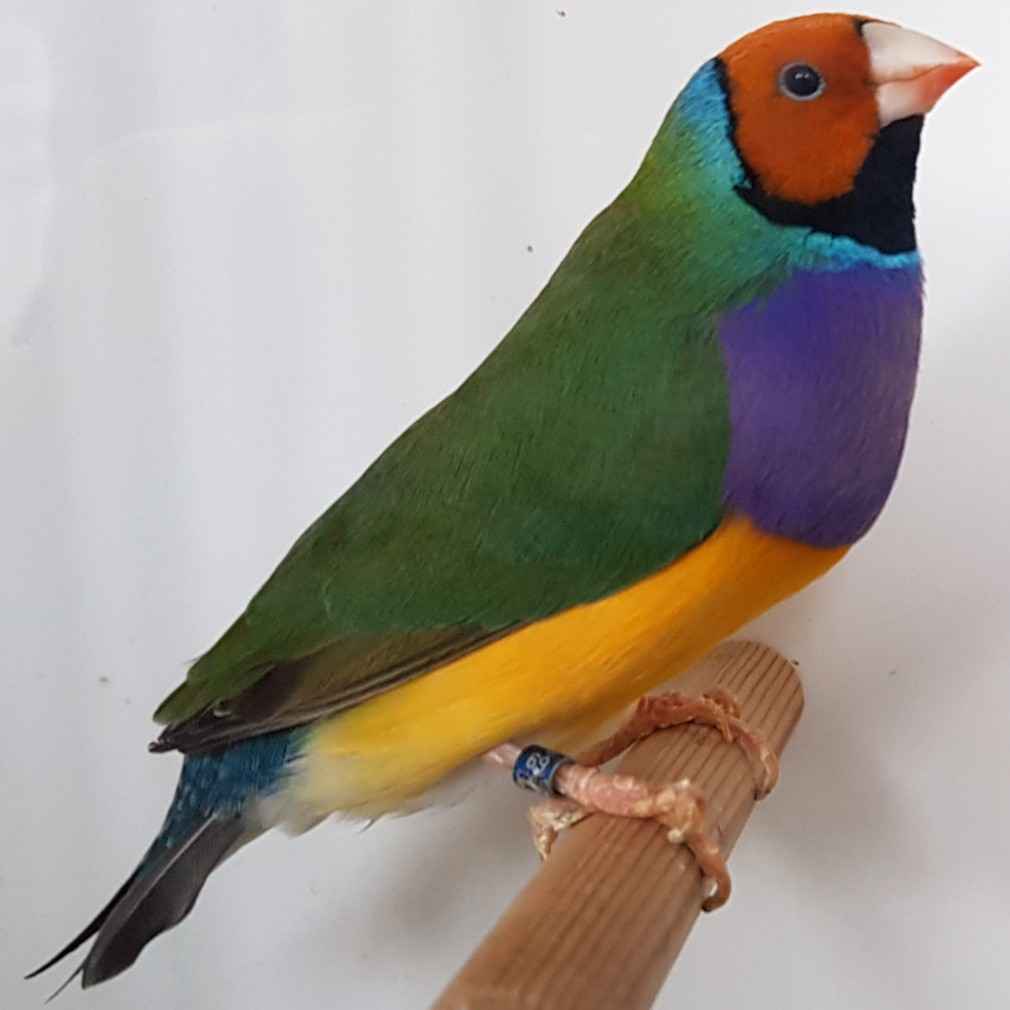
Gouldian finch, Erythrura gouldiae

- Brown thornbill (King Island subspecies), Acanthiza pusilla archibaldi
- Christmas Island goshawk, Accipiter fasciatus natalis
- Wedge-tailed eagle (Tasmanian subspecies), Aquila audax fleayi
- Red-tailed black-cockatoo (south-eastern subspecies), Calyptorhynchus banksii graptogyne
- Glossy black-cockatoo (South Australian and Kangaroo Island subspecies), Calyptorhynchus lathami halmaturinus
- Carnaby's black cockatoo, short-billed black cockatoo, Calyptorhynchus latirostris
- Southern cassowary (Australian subspecies), Casuarius casuarius johnsonii
- Common emerald dove (Christmas Island subspecies), Chalcophaps indica natalis
- Norfolk Island green parrot (formerly the Norfolk Island subspecies of the red-fronted parakeet), Cyanoramphus cookii
- Coxen's fig parrot, Cyclopsitta diophthalma coxeni

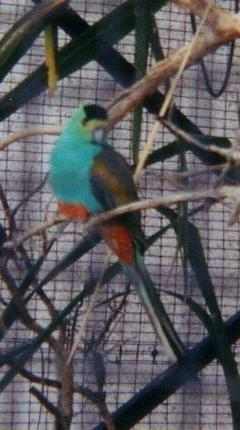
Golden-shouldered parrot

- Eastern bristlebird, Dasyornis brachypterus
- Amsterdam albatross, Diomedea amsterdamensis
- Tristan albatross, Diomedea dabbenena
- Northern royal albatross, Diomedea sanfordi
- Gouldian finch, Erythrura gouldiae
- Buff-banded rail (Cocos (Keeling) Islands subspecies), Gallirallus philippensis andrewsi
- Chestnut-rumped heathwren (Mt Lofty Ranges subspecies), Hylacola pyrrhopygia parkeri
- Swift parrot, Lathamus discolor
- Helmeted honeyeater, Lichenostomus melanops cassidix
- Southern giant-petrel, Macronectes giganteus
- Black-eared miner, Manorina melanotis
- Hooded robin (Tiwi Islands subspecies), Melanodryas cucullata melvillensis
- Star finch (eastern and southern subspecies), Neochmia ruficauda ruficauda
- Norfolk Island boobook, Ninox novaeseelandiae undulata
- Forty-spotted pardalote, Pardalotus quadragintus
- Night parrot, Pezoporus occidentalis
- Western ground parrot, Pezoporus flaviventris
- Black-throated finch (southern subspecies), Poephila cincta cincta
- Golden-shouldered parrot, Psephotus chrysopterygius
- Western whipbird (western heath subspecies), Psophodes nigrogularis nigrogularis
- Gould's petrel (nominate subspecies), Pterodroma leucoptera leucoptera
- Antarctic tern (New Zealand subspecies), Sterna vittata bethunei
- Southern emu-wren (Fleurieu Peninsula and Mount Lofty subspecies), Stipiturus malachurus intermedius
- Abbott's booby, Sula abbotti
- Chatham albatross, Thalassarche eremita
- Christmas thrush, Turdus poliocephalus erythropleurus
- Buff-breasted button-quail, Turnix olivii
- Masked owl (Tiwi Islands subspecies), Tyto novaehollandiae melvillensis
- Regent honeyeater, Xanthomyza phrygia

==== Mammals ====
- Blue whale, Balaenoptera musculus
- Julia Creek dunnart, Sminthopsis douglasi
- Koala (Phascolarctos cinereus)
- Northern bettong, Bettongia tropica
- Mountain pygmy-possum, Burramys parvus
- Christmas Island shrew, Crocidura attenuata trichura
- Ampurta, Dasycercus hillieri
- Northern quoll, Dasyurus hallucatus
- Tiger quoll (north Queensland subspecies), Dasyurus maculatus gracilis
- Tiger quoll (southeastern mainland population), Dasyurus maculatus maculatus

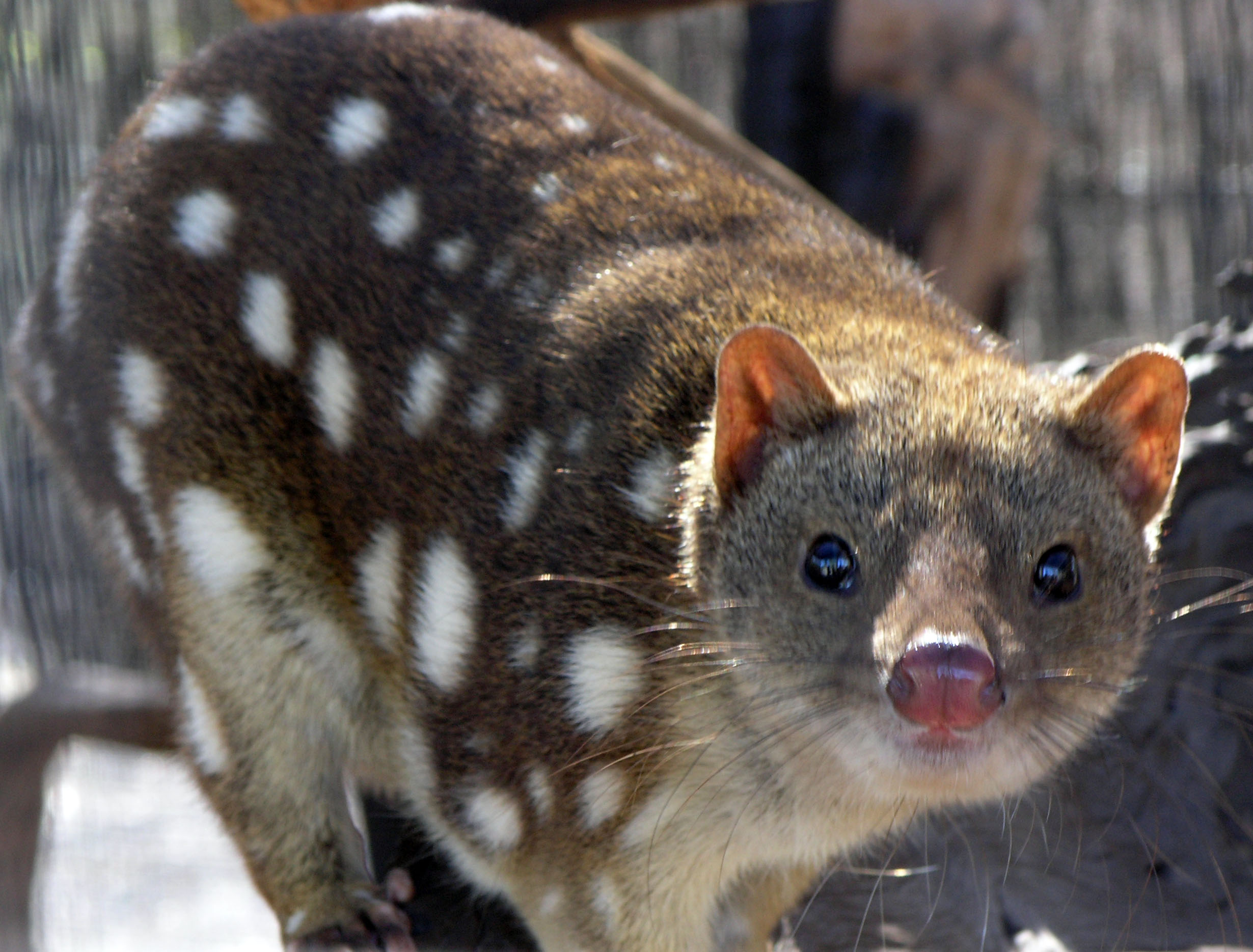
Tiger quoll

- Southern right whale, Eubalaena australis
- Semon's leaf-nosed bat, greater wart-nosed horseshoe-bat, Hipposideros semoni
- Southern brown bandicoot, Isoodon obesulus obesulus
- Rufous hare-wallaby, Lagorchestes hirsutus unnamed subspecies (central mainland form)
- Northern marsupial mole, Notoryctes caurinus
- Southern marsupial mole, Notoryctes typhlops
- Bridled nail-tail wallaby, Onychogalea fraenata
- Dibbler, Parantechinus apicalis
- Western barred bandicoot (Shark Bay subspecies), Perameles bougainville bougainville
- Eastern barred bandicoot, Perameles gunnii unnamed subspecies, mainland
- Mahogany glider, Petaurus gracilis
- Proserpine rock-wallaby, Petrogale persephone
- Red-tailed phascogale, Phascogale calura
- Long-footed potoroo, Potorous longipes
- Spotted cuscus, Spilocuscus maculatus
- Smoky mouse, Pseudomys fumeus
- Hastings River mouse, Pseudomys oralis
- Greater large-eared horseshoe bat, Rhinolophus philippinensis (large form)
- Tasmanian devil Sarcophilus harrisii
- Kangaroo Island dunnart, Sminthopsis aitkeni
- Julia Creek dunnart, Sminthopsis douglasi
- Sandhill dunnart, Sminthopsis psammophila
- Carpentarian rock rat, Zyzomys palatalis
- Central rock rat, Zyzomys pedunculatus
- Northern hairy-nosed wombat Lasiorhinus krefftii

=== Vulnerable ===
==== Invertebrates ====
- Draculoides bramstokeri
- Mount Arthur burrowing crayfish, Engaeus orramakunna
- Burnie burrowing crayfish, Engaeus yabbimunna
- Lasionectes exleyi, a cave-dwelling remipede crustacean
- Giant Gippsland earthworm, Megascolides australis
- Bathurst copper, purple copper, Paralucia spinifera

==== Fish ====
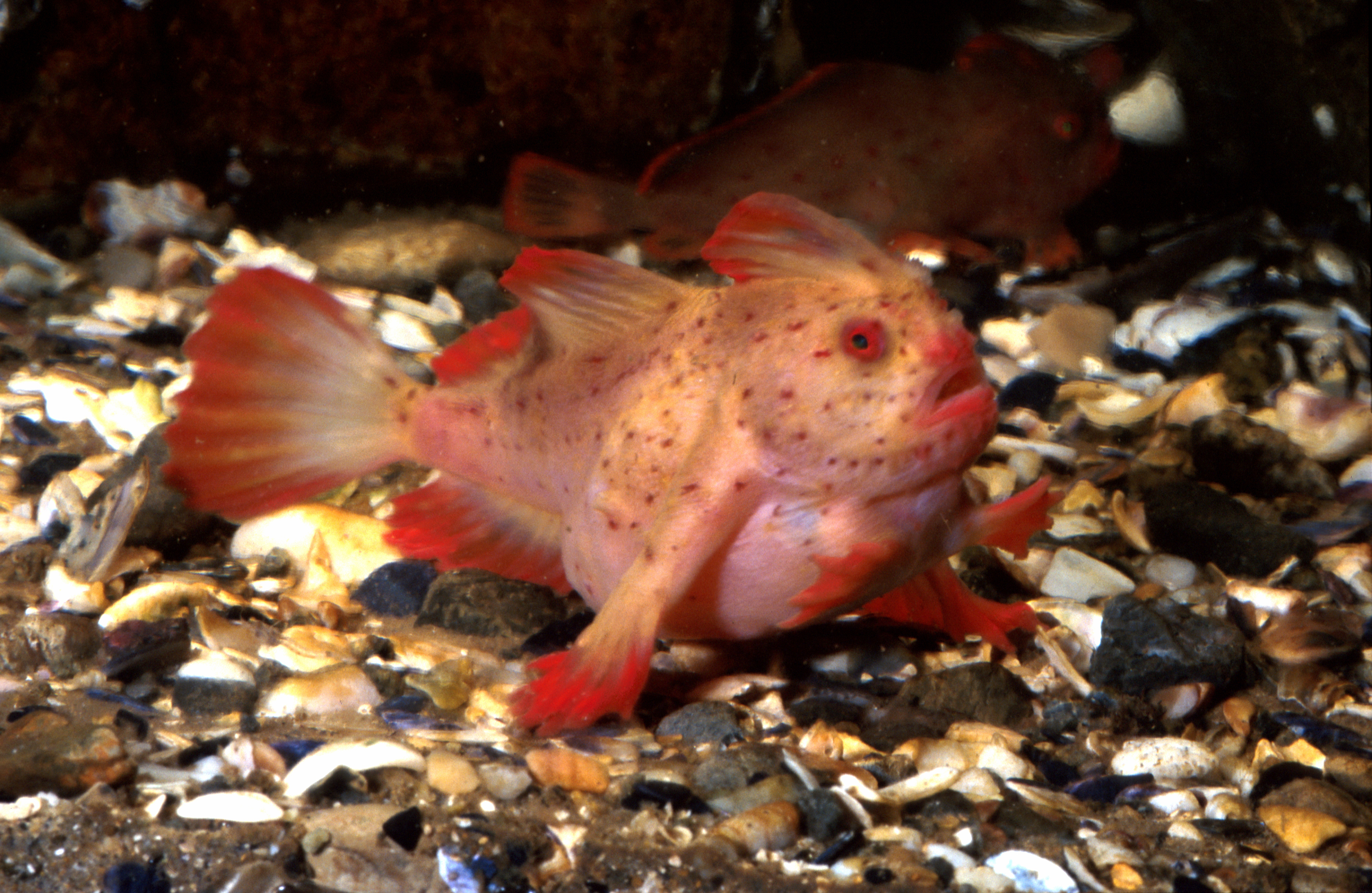
The red handfish

- Red handfish, Brachionichthys politus
- Grey nurse shark, Carcharias taurus (west coast population)
- Great white shark, Carcharodon carcharias

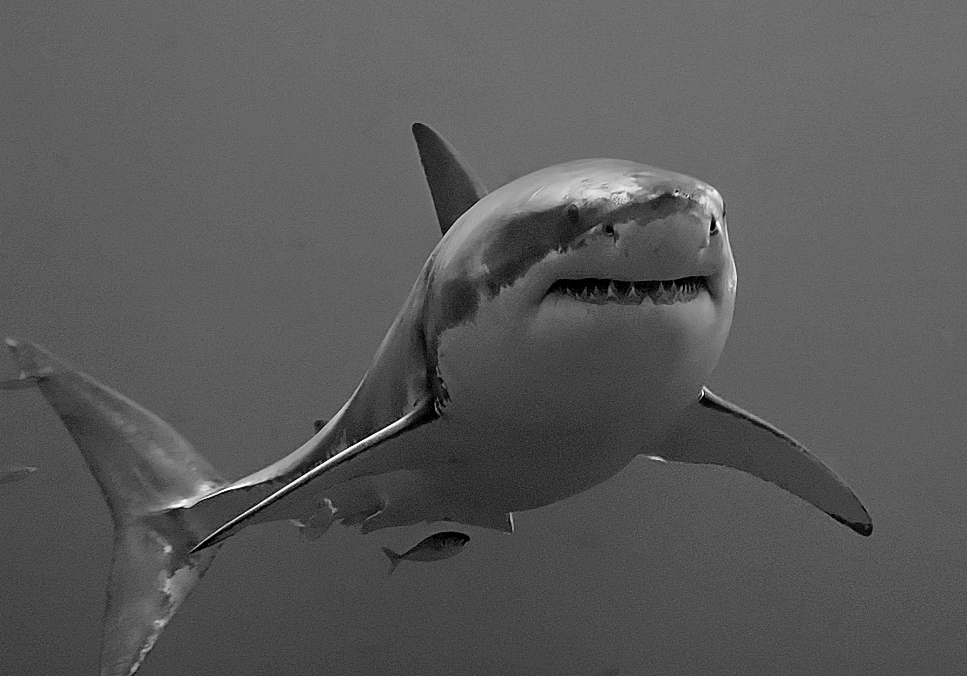
Great white shark

- Edgbaston goby, Chlamydogobius squamigenus
- Murray hardyhead, Craterocephalus fluviatilis
- Swamp galaxias, Galaxias parvus
- Saddled galaxias, Galaxias tanycephalus
- Eastern dwarf galaxias, dwarf galaxias, Galaxiella pusilla
- Murray cod, cod, goodoo, Maccullochella peelii
- Blind gudgeon, Milyeringa veritas
- Flinders Ranges gudgeon, Mogurnda clivicola
- Balston's pygmy perch, Nannatherina balstoni
- Yarra pygmy perch, Nannoperca obscura
- Ewens pygmy perch, golden pygmy perch, variegated pygmy perch, Nannoperca variegata
- Australian lungfish, Queensland lungfish, Neoceratodus forsteri
- Blind cave eel, Ophisternon candidum
- Shannon paragalaxias, Paragalaxias dissimilis
- Great Lake paragalaxias, Paragalaxias eleotroides
- Dwarf sawfish, Queensland sawfish, Pristis clavata
- Freshwater sawfish, largetooth sawfish, Pristis microdon
- Green sawfish, dindagubba, narrowsnout sawfish, Pristis zijsron
- Australian grayling, Prototroctes maraena
- Honey blue-eye, Pseudomugil mellis
- Whale shark, Rhincodon typus
- Waterfall Bay handfish, Sympterichthys species [CSIRO #T1996.01]
- Ziebell's handfish Sympterichthys species [CSIRO #T6.01]

==== Frogs ====
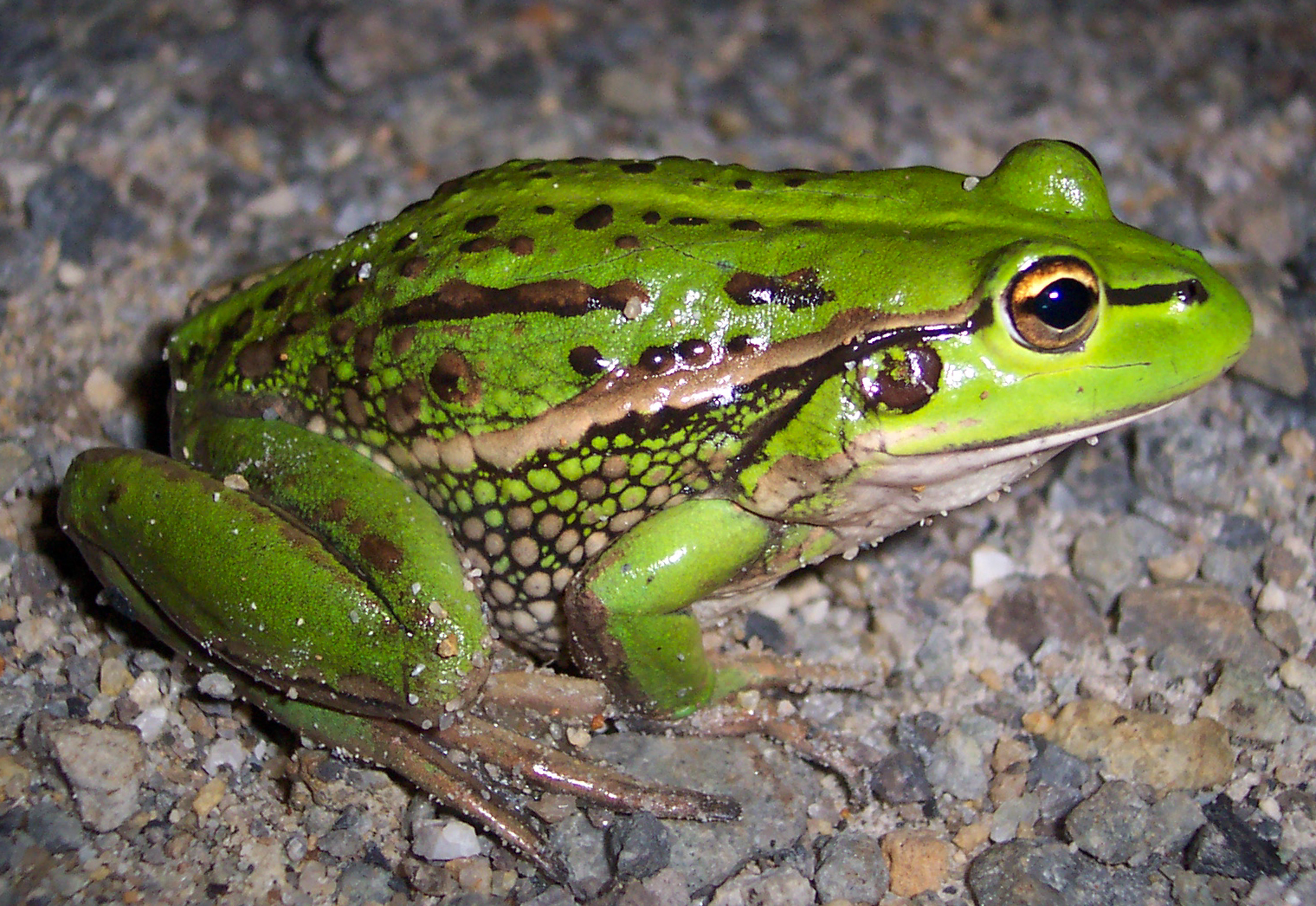
Growling grass frog

- Orange-bellied frog, Geocrinia vitellina
- Giant burrowing frog, Heleioporus australiacus
- Green and golden bell frog, Litoria aurea
- Littlejohn's tree frog, heath frog, Litoria littlejohni
- Wallum sedge frog, Litoria olongburensis
- Peppered tree frog, Litoria piperata
- Southern bell frog, growling grass frog, warty bell frog, Litoria raniformis
- Alpine tree frog, Verreaux's alpine tree frog, Litoria verreauxii alpina
- Stuttering frog, southern barred frog (in Victoria), Mixophyes balbus
- Magnificent brood frog, Pseudophryne covacevichae
- Northern corroboree frog, Pseudophryne pengilleyi
- Kroombit tinker frog, Pleione's torrent frog, Taudactylus pleione
- Blue Mountains tree frog, Litoria citropa

==== Reptiles ====
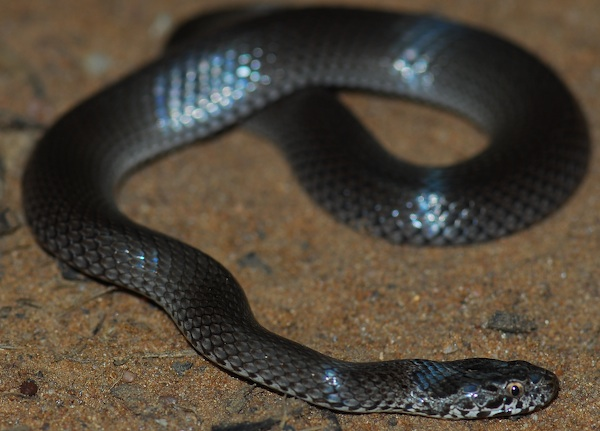
Ornamental snake

- Five-clawed worm-skink, long-legged worm-skink, Anomalopus mackayi
- Pink-tailed worm-lizard, Aprasia parapulchella
- Flinders Ranges worm-lizard, Aprasia pseudopulchella
- Hermite Island worm-lizard, Aprasia rostrata rostrata
- Green turtle, Chelonia mydas
- Lord Howe Island gecko, Christinus guentheri
- Three-toed snake-tooth skink, Coeranoscincus reticulatus
- Yinnietharra rock dragon, Ctenophorus yinnietharra
- Airlie Island ctenotus, Ctenotus angusticeps
- Lancelin Island skink, Ctenotus lancelini
- Hamelin ctenotus, Ctenotus zastictus
- Striped legless lizard, Delma impar
- Striped-tailed delma, Delma labialis
- Atherton delma, legless lizard, Delma mitella
- Collared delma, Delma torquata
- Ornamental snake, Denisonia maculata
- Great desert skink, tjakura, warrarna, mulyamiji, Egernia kintorei
- Yakka skink, Egernia rugosa
- Baudin Island spiny-tailed skink, Egernia stokesii aethiops
- Bell's turtle, Namoi River turtle, Bell's saw-shelled turtle, Elseya belli
- Bellinger River emydura, Emydura macquarii signata
- Hawksbill turtle, Eretmochelys imbricata
- Dunmall's snake, Furina dunmalli
- Broad-headed snake, Hoplocephalus bungaroides
- Christmas Island gecko, Lister's gecko, Lepidodactylus listeri
- Mount Cooper striped lerista, Lerista vittata
- Pilbara olive python, Liasis olivaceus barroni
- Flatback turtle, Natator depressus
- Pernatty knob-tail, Nephrurus deleani
- Pedra Branca skink, red-throated skink, Niveoscincus palfreymani
- Krefft's tiger snake (Flinders Ranges), Notechis ater ater
- Bronzeback snake-lizard, Ophidiocephalus taeniatus
- Brigalow scaly-foot, Paradelma orientalis
- Lord Howe Island skink, Pseudemoia lichenigera
- Christmas Island blind snake, Ramphotyphlops exocoeti
- Fitzroy River turtle, Rheodytes leukops
- Border thick-tailed gecko, Underwoodisaurus sphyrurus

==== Birds ====
- Slender-billed thornbill (western subspecies), Acanthiza iredalei iredalei
- Grey grasswren (Bulloo River subspecies), Amytornis barbatus barbatus
- Thick-billed grasswren (eastern subspecies), Amytornis textilis modestus
- Thick-billed grasswren (Gawler Ranges subspecies), Amytornis textilis myall
- Lesser noddy (Australian subspecies), Anous tenuirostris melanops
- Noisy scrub-bird, Atrichornis clamosus
- Muir's corella, Cacatua pastinator pastinator
- Baudin's black-cockatoo, long-billed black-cockatoo, Calyptorhynchus baudinii
- Cape Barren goose (south-western subspecies), Recherche Cape Barren goose, Cereopsis novaehollandiae grisea

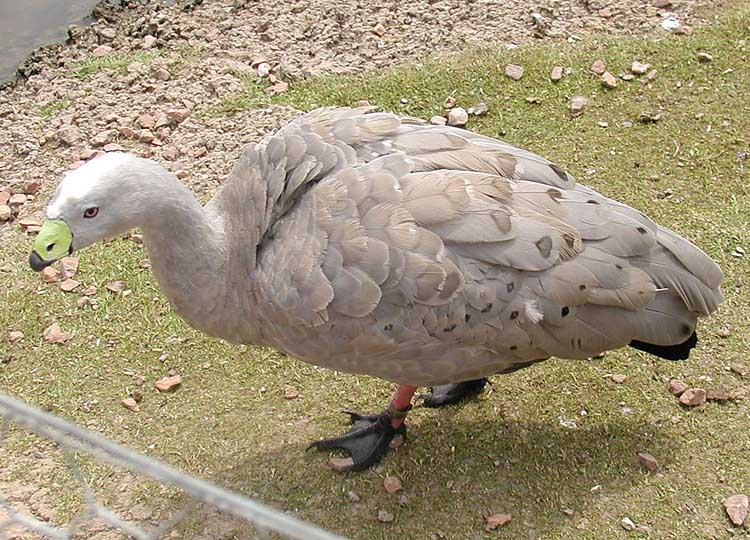
Cape Barren goose

- Western bristlebird, Dasyornis longirostris
- Antipodean albatross, Diomedea antipodensis
- Southern royal albatross, Diomedea epomophora
- Wandering albatross, Diomedea exulans
- Gibson's albatross, Diomedea gibsoni
- Red goshawk, Erythrotriorchis radiatus
- Crested shrike-tit (northern subspecies), northern shrike-tit, Falcunculus frontatus whitei
- Christmas Island frigatebird, Andrew's frigatebird, Fregata andrewsi
- White-bellied storm-petrel (Tasman Sea or Australasian subspecies), Fregetta grallaria grallaria
- Squatter pigeon (southern subspecies), Geophaps scripta scripta
- Partridge pigeon (western subspecies), Geophaps smithii blaauwi
- Partridge pigeon (eastern subspecies), Geophaps smithii smithii
- Blue petrel, Halobaena caerulea
- Malleefowl, Leipoa ocellata
- Northern giant-petrel, Macronectes halli
- Purple-crowned fairy-wren, (western subspecies), Malurus coronatus coronatus
- White-winged fairywren (Barrow Island subspecies), Barrow Island black-and-white fairywren, Malurus leucopterus edouardi
- White-winged fairy-wren (Dirk Hartog Island subspecies), Dirk Hartog black-and-white fairy-wren, Malurus leucopterus leucopterus
- Crimson finch (white-bellied subspecies), Neochmia phaeton evangelinae
- Christmas Island hawk-owl, Ninox natalis
- Norfolk golden whistler, Pachycephala pectoralis xanthoprocta

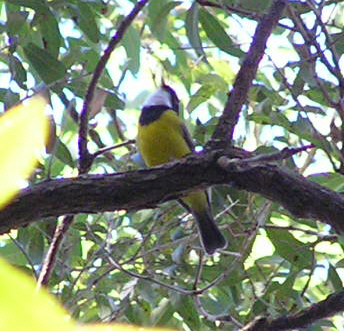
Golden whistler

- Red-lored whistler, Pachycephala rufogularis
- Fairy prion (southern subspecies), Pachyptila turtur subantarctica
- Plains-wanderer, Pedionomus torquatus
- Scarlet robin (Norfolk Island subspecies), Petroica multicolor multicolor
- Heard shag, Phalacrocorax nivalis
- Macquarie shag, Phalacrocorax purpurascens
- Sooty albatross, Phoebetria fusca
- Princess parrot, Alexandra's parrot, Polytelis alexandrae
- Regent parrot (eastern subspecies), Polytelis anthopeplus monarchoides
- Superb parrot, Polytelis swainsonii
- Western whipbird (eastern subspecies), Psophodes nigrogularis leucogaster
- Western whipbird (western mallee subspecies), Psophodes nigrogularis oberon
- Soft-plumaged petrel, Pterodroma mollis
- Kermadec petrel (western subspecies), Pterodroma neglecta neglecta
- Australian painted snipe, Rostratula australis
- Antarctic tern (Indian Ocean subspecies), Sterna vittata vittata
- Southern emu-wren (Eyre Peninsula subspecies), Stipiturus malachurus parimeda
- Mallee emu-wren, Stipiturus mallee
- Lord Howe Island currawong, pied currawong (Lord Howe Island subspecies), Strepera graculina crissalis
- Buller's albatross, Thalassarche bulleri
- Indian yellow-nosed albatross, Thalassarche carteri
- Shy albatross, Thalassarche cauta
- Grey-headed albatross, Thalassarche chrysostoma
- Campbell albatross, Thalassarche impavida
- Black-browed albatross, Thalassarche melanophris
- Pacific albatross, Thalassarche nov. sp.
- Salvin's albatross, Thalassarche salvini
- White-capped albatross, Thalassarche steadi
- Lord Howe woodhen, Tricholimnas sylvestris
- Black-breasted button-quail, Turnix melanogaster
- Abrolhos painted buttonquail, Turnix varius scintillans
- Masked owl (northern subspecies), Tyto novaehollandiae kimberli

==== Mammals ====
- Subantarctic fur seal, Arctocephalus tropicalis
- Sei whale, Balaenoptera borealis
- Fin whale, Balaenoptera physalus
- Boodie, burrowing bettong (Shark Bay subspecies), Bettongia lesueur lesueur
- Boodie, burrowing bettong (Barrow and Boodie Islands subspecies), Bettongia lesueur unnamed subspecies
- Dingo, Canis dingo
- Large-eared pied bat, large pied bat, Chalinolobus dwyeri
- Kowari, Dasycercus byrnei
- Mulgara, Dasycercus cristicauda
- Chuditch, western quoll, Dasyurus geoffroii
- Spot-tailed quoll, spotted-tail quoll, tiger quoll (Tasmanian population), Dasyurus maculatus maculatus
- Golden bandicoot (mainland subspecies), Isoodon auratus auratus
- Golden bandicoot (Barrow Island subspecies), Isoodon auratus barrowensis
- Southern brown bandicoot (Nuyts Archipelago subspecies), Isoodon obesulus nauticus
- Spectacled hare-wallaby (Barrow Island subspecies), Lagorchestes conspicillatus conspicillatus
- Rufous hare-wallaby (Bernier Island subspecies), Lagorchestes hirsutus bernieri
- Rufous hare-wallaby (Dorre Island subspecies), Lagorchestes hirsutus dorreae
- Banded hare-wallaby, marnine, munning, Lagostrophus fasciatus fasciatus
- Greater stick-nest rat, wopilkara, Leporillus conditor
- Barrow Island euro, Macropus robustus isabellinus
- Greater bilby, Macrotis lagotis
- Humpback whale, Megaptera novaeangliae
- Golden-backed tree-rat, Mesembriomys macrurus
- Southern elephant seal, Mirounga leonina
- Numbat, Myrmecobius fasciatus
- Australian sea-lion, Neophoca cinerea
- Northern hopping-mouse, Notomys aquilo
- Dusky hopping-mouse, wilkiniti, Notomys fuscus
- Corben's long-eared bat, south-eastern long-eared bat, Nyctophilus corbeni
- Eastern barred bandicoot (Tasmania subspecies), Perameles gunnii gunnii
- Yellow-bellied glider, fluffy glider (Wet Tropics subspecies), Petaurus australis unnamed subspecies.
- Warru, black-footed rock-wallaby (MacDonnell Ranges race), Petrogale lateralis MacDonnell Ranges race
- Black-footed rock-wallaby (West Kimberley race), Petrogale lateralis West Kimberley race
- Recherche rock-wallaby, Petrogale lateralis hacketti
- Black-flanked rock-wallaby, Petrogale lateralis lateralis
- Pearson Island rock-wallaby, Petrogale lateralis pearsoni
- Brush-tailed rock-wallaby, Petrogale penicillata
- Yellow-footed rock-wallaby (South Australia and New South Wales subspecies), Petrogale xanthopus xanthopus
- Long-nosed potoroo (south-east mainland subspecies), Potorous tridactylus tridactylus
- Carpentarian false antechinus, Pseudantechinus mimulus
- Western ringtail possum, Pseudocheirus occidentalis
- Plains rat, Pseudomys australis
- Djoongari, Alice Springs mouse, Shark Bay mouse, Pseudomys fieldi
- Pilliga mouse, Pseudomys pilligaensis
- Heath mouse, Pseudomys shortridgei
- Spectacled flying-fox, Pteropus conspicillatus
- Grey-headed flying-fox, Pteropus poliocephalus
- Pilbara leaf-nosed bat, Rhinonicteris aurantius (Pilbara form)
- Quokka, Setonix brachyurus
- Butler's dunnart, Sminthopsis butleri
- Boullanger Island dunnart, Sminthopsis griseoventer boullangerensis
- Common wombat (Bass Strait subspecies), Vombatus ursinus ursinus
- False water rat, water mouse, Xeromys myoides
- Arnhem rock-rat, Arnhem Land rock-rat, Zyzomys maini

=== Conservation-dependent ===
Four fish and one mammal are dependent on conservation measures.

==== Fish ====
- School shark, eastern school shark, snapper shark, tope, soupfin shark, Galeorhinus galeus
- Orange roughy, deep-sea perch, red roughy, Hoplostethus atlanticus
- Eastern gemfish, Rexea solandri (eastern Australian population)
- Southern bluefin tuna, Thunnus maccoyii

==== Mammals ====
- Southern bent-wing bat, Miniopterus schreibersii bassanii

== See also ==
- List of Australian animals extinct in the Holocene
- Fauna of Australia
- Invasive species in Australia
- Land clearing in Australia
- Threatened species § Australia
- Woodchipping in Australia
