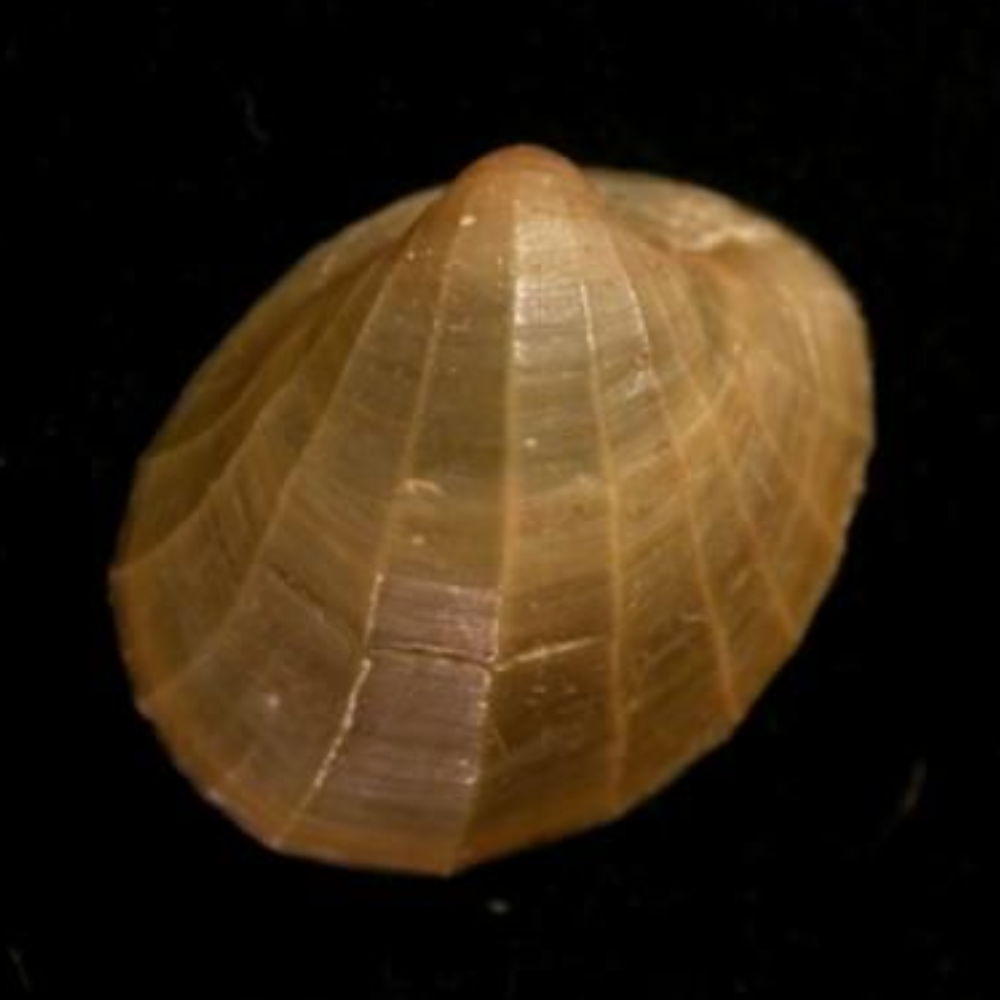

Scientific classification
- Kingdom: Animalia
- Phylum: Mollusca
- Class: Gastropoda
- Superorder: Hygrophila
- Family: Planorbidae
- Genus: Ancylastrum
- Species: A. irvinae

Binomial name
- Ancylastrum irvinae (Petterd, 1888)

Synonyms
- Ancylus irvinae Petterd, 1888; superseded combination

= Ancylastrum irvinae =

Species of mollusc

Ancylastrum irvinae is a somewhat large freshwater snail in the family Planorbidae. It has a limpet-like ribbed shell with a curly spire. It is endemic to lakes in central Tasmania, Australia.

== Taxonomy ==
Ancylastrum irvinae was first described in 1888 by William Frederick Petterd, discovered in the Great Lake in Tasmania by Mr. R. Irvine. The name "irvinae" is actually dedicated to Mrs. Irvine, as she had an interest in shells.

Some sources do not consider A. irvinae to be a valid species, instead placing it as a variant of Ancylastrum cumingianum. Other sources differentiate the two, which may cause misidentification issues in museum specimens. Another source states that A. irvinae was forgotten to have existed as its own species until its rediscovery in 2015.

== Description ==
=== Shell description ===
Ancylastrum irvinae has a limpet-like (patelliform) shell, described as thin, brown, and translucent. The shell measures about 19 mm (0.75 in) in length, 14 mm (0.55 in) in width, and 7 mm (0.28 in) in height. It is the larger of the two Ancylastrum species. The shell has between 12 and 14 angular ribs, which join at the top (apex) of the shell. These ribs can be also be seen from the inside of the shell. The spire, a structure formed by stacks of whorls, is highly reduced, and curls down and to the right of the animal.

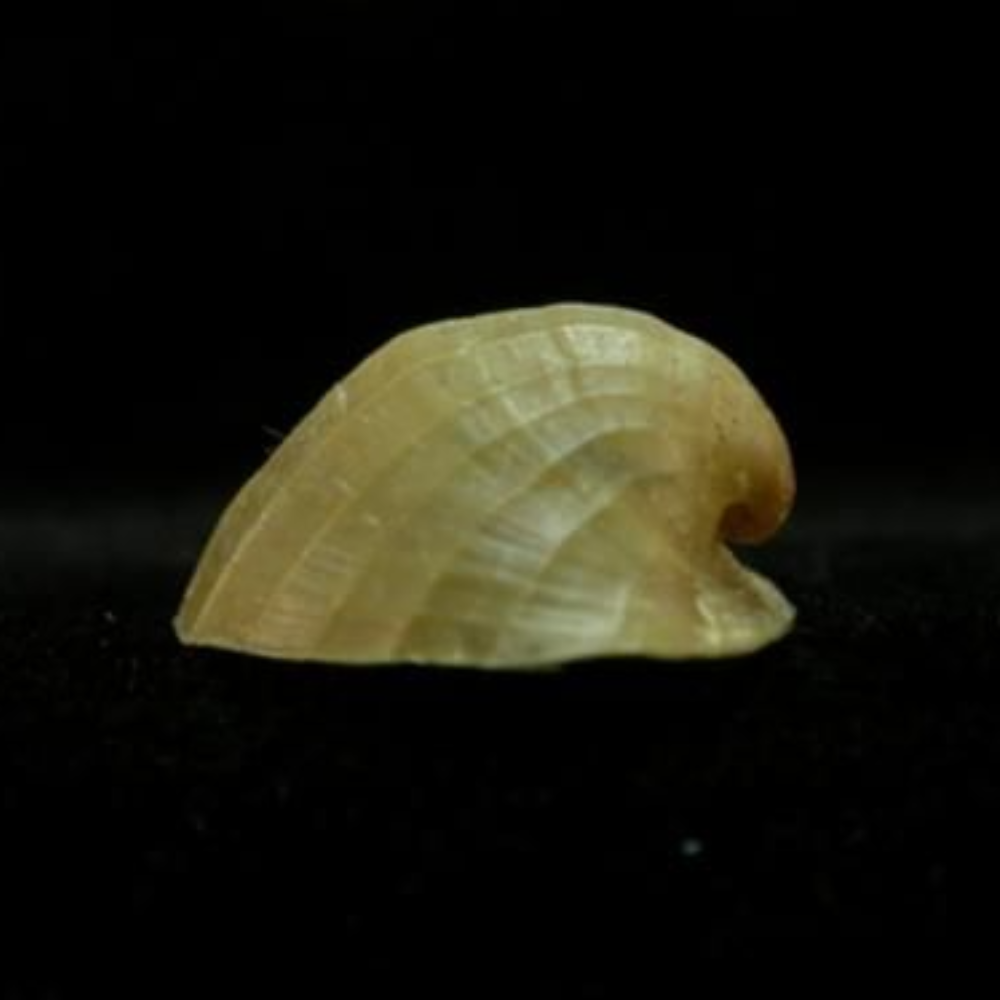
The ribbed shell and curled spire of the animal

Some plasticity in the animal's shell has been observed, with some specimens being taller and more strongly ribbed, and others shorter and less strongly ribbed. This species may be distinguished from Ancylastrum cumingianum by its large size and the presence of obvious ribs.

=== Other characteristics ===
The central (rachidian) tooth on the radula (a tongue-like organ) possesses two curved cusps. This distinguishes it from the radula of A. cumingianum, which only curves on the outer side of the cusp. On each side of the rachidian tooth, serrated lateral teeth transition into tricuspid marginal teeth.

Another distinguishing characteristic of this species is its branched penis, which splits into two lobes. The tip of each lobe has a different structure associated with it; one has a stylet, while the other opens into the vas deferens. This is different than the unbranched penis of A. cumingianum.

== Distribution, habitat, and ecology ==
Ancylastrum irvinae is known to inhabit the Great Lake in Tasmania, Australia. It was first discovered on shallow rocks along the lake's edge. Some sources report the species outside this limited range, though other sources state that this was an error, and that the species may only be found in highland lakes. Others infer that the species is found exclusively in the Great Lake.

This species may share its habitat with other mollusks, including Sphaerium tasmanicum, one species from the genus Physa, Ancylastrum cumingianum, Beddomeia tumida, and Glyptophysa novahollandica. It also occurs alongside the shrimp Paranaspides and the fish Paragalaxias. The species faces predation from Brown trout, which were introduced to the Great Lake in 1870. Additionally, turbellarian flatworms, including Planaria, have been observed to prey on this snail. A. irvinae may further be parasitized by both leeches and worms.

In 2015, lowered water levels in the Great Lake led to a large die-off of this species, leading to an effort to document and collect samples. Adults and egg masses were collected for further study, though many did not survive. Despite the casualties, the population is hypothesized to be doing well. The water levels were finally raised in 2017, and in 2021, the population was confirmed to have recovered.

In the lab, A. irvinae was observed to be relatively active during both day and night, grazing along rocks, wood, and the aquarium glass for periphyton. It was observed to move very slowly, at a rate of less than 1.5 cm (0.59 in) per minute.

== Reproduction and development ==
Ancylastrum irvinae lays eggs in a clockwise spiral on rocks. The pink eggs are contained within a gelatinous membrane called the pallium gelatinosum. The egg masses of this species measured about 17 by 15 by 9 mm (0.67 by 0.59 by 0.35 in) at maximum, larger than those of Ancylastrum cumingianum. The exact size of the egg masses may relate to the size of the animal and the season, with those laid in late summer being smaller. It is hypothesized that this species primarily lays its eggs between October and March.

In laboratory conditions, two juveniles hatched from their eggs after 64 days of development, though development only began in December, two months after the eggs were laid. The freshly hatched juveniles measured 4 by 2.4 by 1 mm (0.157 by 0.094 by 0.039 in)
