= Kimberley rock rat =

Conservation status
- Least Concern (IUCN 3.1)

Scientific classification
- Kingdom: Animalia
- Phylum: Chordata
- Class: Mammalia
- Order: Rodentia
- Family: Muridae
- Genus: Zyzomys
- Species: Z. woodwardi

Binomial name
- Zyzomys woodwardi (Thomas, 1909)
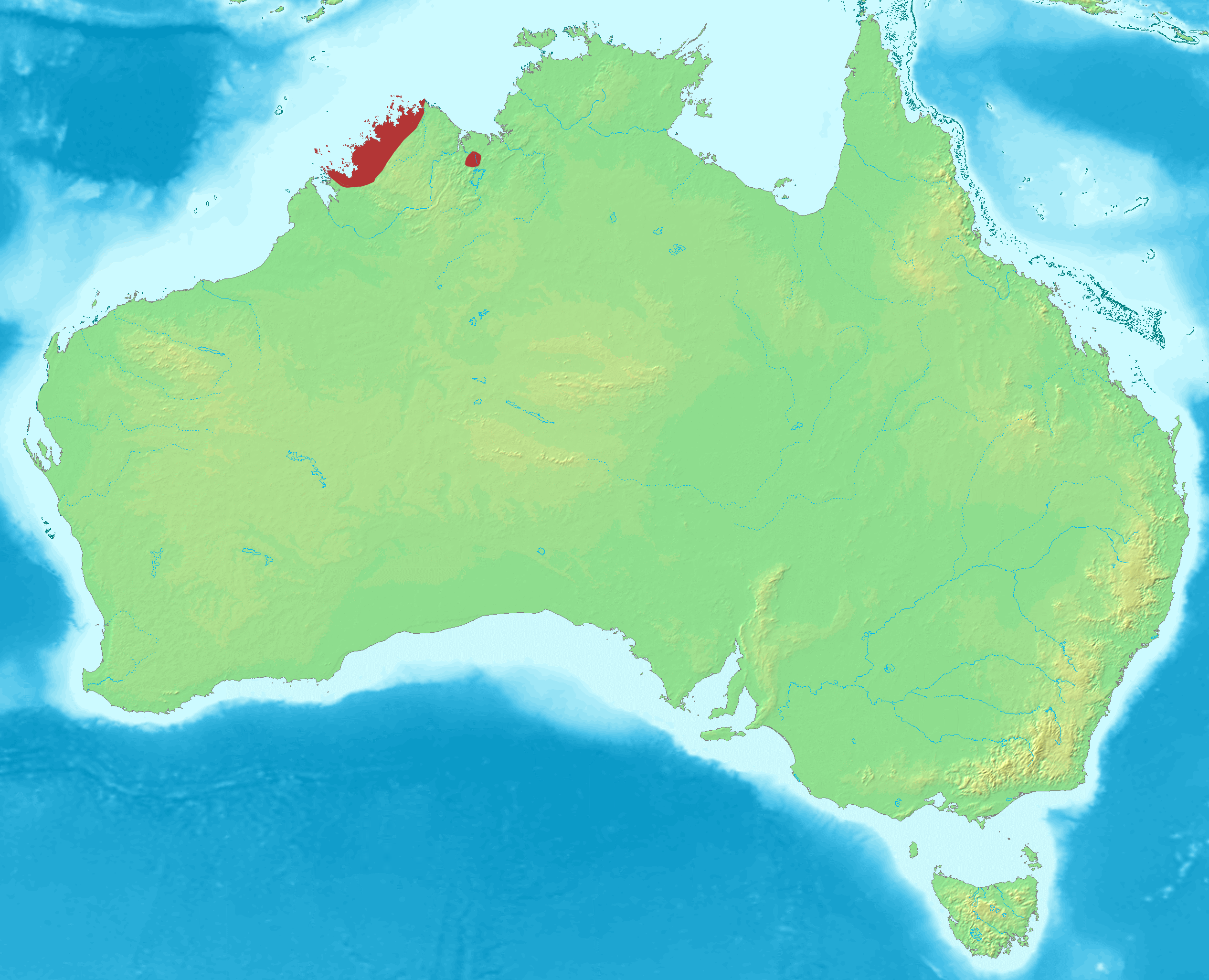
- Distribution of the Kimberley rock rat

Species of rodent

The Kimberley rock rat (Zyzomys woodwardi) is a species of rodent in the family Muridae. It is found only in Australia, specifically in the northern tropical part of the Northern Territory and adjacent Kimberley region of Western Australia, in high-altitude closed forest.

Biologists have proposed that Zyzomys woodwardi speciated from Zyzomys argurus around 8,000 years ago due to a large flood that increased the wetness of the environment. In response to the wetter environment Zyzomys woodwardi had a better Darwinian fitness and out-competed Zyzomys argurus due to new selective pressures and over time the two species were separated by large vine thickets and sandstone barriers.

The species is present in the Charnley River–Artesian Range Wildlife Sanctuary in the Kimberley region of WA.
