= Engaeus australis =

Conservation status
- Near Threatened (IUCN 3.1)

Scientific classification
- Kingdom: Animalia
- Phylum: Arthropoda
- Class: Malacostraca
- Order: Decapoda
- Suborder: Pleocyemata
- Family: Parastacidae
- Genus: Engaeus
- Species: E. australis

Binomial name
- Engaeus australis Riek, 1969

Species of crayfish

Engaeus australis, the lilly pilly burrowing crayfish, is a species of crayfish in the family Parastacidae. It is endemic to Australia. Engaeus australis is in the Near-threatened status in the International Union for Conservation of Nature(IUCN)'s List.

== Sources ==
- Doran, N. & Horwitz, P. 2010. Engaeus australis. IUCN Red List of Threatened Species 2010. Retrieved 5 February 2017.
