= Paragalaxias julianus =

Conservation status
- Endangered (IUCN 3.1)

Scientific classification
- Kingdom: Animalia
- Phylum: Chordata
- Class: Actinopterygii
- Division: Teleostei
- Order: Galaxiiformes
- Family: Galaxiidae
- Genus: Paragalaxias
- Species: P. julianus

Binomial name
- Paragalaxias julianus McDowall & Fulton, 1978

Species of ray-finned fish

Paragalaxias julianus, also known as the Julian galaxias, is a species of ray-finned fish in the family Galaxiidae. The species is only known from the Central Plateau of Tasmania in Australia and is usually 6 cm (2.4 in) long (SL), the largest specimen ever recorded was 10 cm (3.9 in) long (SL).

== Status ==
The fish is classified as an endangered species by the IUCN under criteria B1ab(iii)+2ab(iii).
