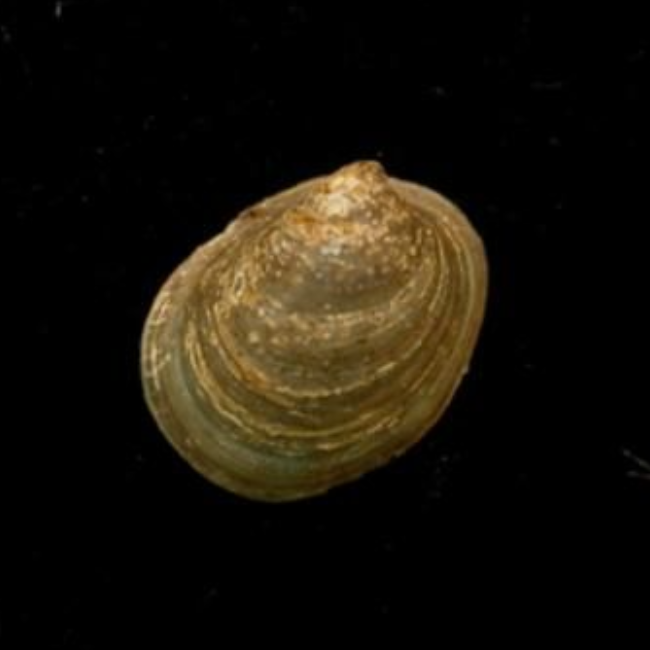
- Shell of Ancylastrum cumingianum

Scientific classification
- Kingdom: Animalia
- Phylum: Mollusca
- Class: Gastropoda
- Superorder: Hygrophila
- Family: Planorbidae
- Genus: Ancylastrum; Bourguignat, 1853

Type species
- Ancylus (Ancylastrum) cumingianus Bourguignat, 1853

Synonyms
- Ancylus (Ancylastrum) Bourguignat, 1853; superseded rank

= Ancylastrum =

Genus of gastropods

Ancylastrum is a genus of air-breathing freshwater limpets, aquatic pulmonate gastropod mollusks in the family Planorbidae, the ram's horn snails and their allies.

== Taxonomy ==
Ancylastrum was first described as a subgenus of Ancylus in 1853 by Jules René Bourguignat, a malacologist. He named Ancylastrum cumingianum as the type species. Several authors later erroneously redescribed the genus under different names, including Legrandia and Cumingia. Additionally, the name Ancylastrum is sometimes credited to Alfred Moquin-Tandon, though officially, the name belongs to Bourguignat because of his publication of the name.

== Species ==
The genus Ancylastrum includes the following species:

- Ancylastrum cumingianum (Bourguignat, 1853) - Australian freshwater limpet
- Ancylastrum irvinae (Petterd, 1888)

Species inquirenda

- Ancylastrum dextrorsum Clessin, 1907
- Ancylastrum issykulense Clessin, 1907
- Ancylastrum ovatum Clessin, 1907
- Ancylastrum turkestanicum Clessin, 1907
