= Engaeus curvisuturus =

Conservation status
- Data Deficient (IUCN 3.1)

Scientific classification
- Kingdom: Animalia
- Phylum: Arthropoda
- Class: Malacostraca
- Order: Decapoda
- Suborder: Pleocyemata
- Family: Parastacidae
- Genus: Engaeus
- Species: E. curvisuturus

Binomial name
- Engaeus curvisuturus Horwitz, 1990

Species of crayfish

Engaeus curvisuturus is a species of crayfish in the family Parastacidae. It is endemic to the Yarra Ranges region of Victoria, Australia.

== Sources ==
- Doran, N. and Horwitz, P. 2010. Engaeus curvisuturus. IUCN Red List of Threatened Species 2010. retrieved 5 February 2017
