= Engaeus sternalis =

Conservation status
- Critically Endangered (IUCN 3.1)

Scientific classification
- Kingdom: Animalia
- Phylum: Arthropoda
- Class: Malacostraca
- Order: Decapoda
- Suborder: Pleocyemata
- Family: Parastacidae
- Genus: Engaeus
- Species: E. sternalis

Binomial name
- Engaeus sternalis Clark, 1936

Species of crayfish

Engaeus sternalis, the Warragul burrowing crayfish, is a species of crayfish in the family Parastacidae. It is endemic to Australia. It is only known from locations on the Labertuche Creek and Wattle Creek (a tributary of Labertouche Creek) in west Gippsland. It is a cryptic, burrowing species with a very limited distribution, and virtually nothing is known about its ecology, population dynamics or habitat requirements.

== Sources ==
- Doran, N. & Horwitz, P. 2010. Engaeus sternalis. IUCN Red List of Threatened Species 2010. Retrieved 5 February 2017.
