= Top End =

- Region
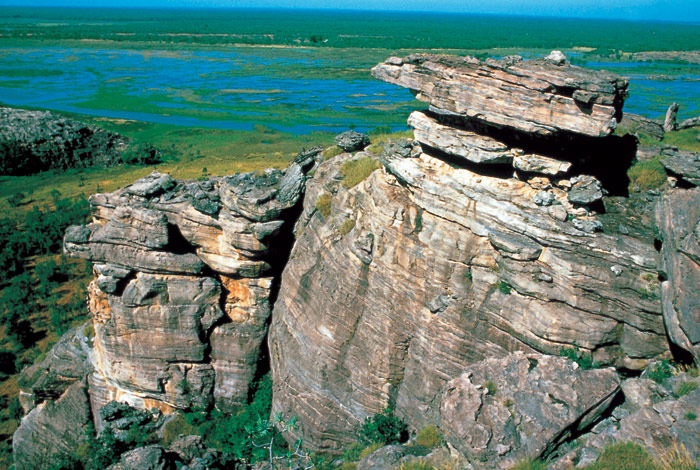
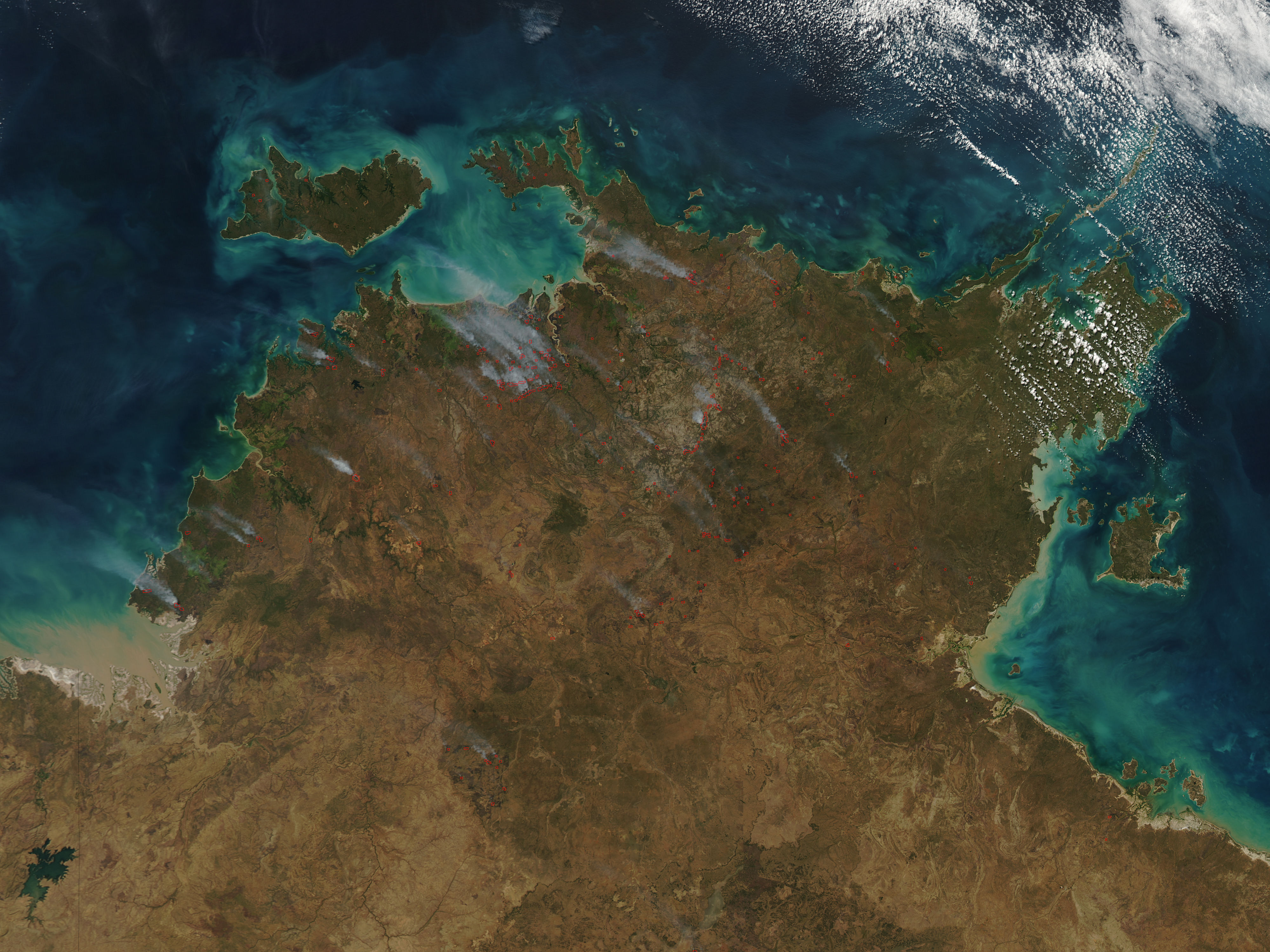
- Sandstone outcrop and wetlands in Kakadu National Park A NASA satellite image of the Top End

- Coordinates: 13.39°S 132.96°E
- Country: Australia
- State: Northern Territory

Area
  - Total: 245,000 km^{2} (95,000 sq mi)
- Time zone: UTC+09:30 (ACST)
- Mean max temp: 36 °C (97 °F)
- Mean min temp: 18 °C (64 °F)
- Annual rainfall: 1,000 mm (39 in)

The Top End is a geographical region encompassing the northernmost section of the Northern Territory of Australia, which, aside from the Cape York Peninsula in Queensland, is the northernmost part of the Australian continent. It covers a rather vaguely defined area of about 245,000 square kilometres (95,000 sq mi) behind the northern coast from the Northern Territory capital of Darwin across to Arnhem Land, with the Indian Ocean on the west, the Arafura Sea to the north, and the Gulf of Carpentaria to the east, and with the almost waterless semi-arid interior of Australia to the south, beyond the huge Kakadu National Park.

The Top End contains the Territory's regional center and its capital city, Darwin, as well as major towns such as Palmerston and Katherine. The well-known town of Alice Springs is located further south, in the arid southern part of the Northern Territory, sometimes referred to by Australians as the Red Centre.

The landscape is relatively flat with river floodplains and grasslands with eucalyptus trees along with rocky areas and patches of rainforest, and in western Arnhem Land a high rugged sandstone plateau cut through with gorges, much of which is in Kakadu National Park. The rivers that form the wetlands include the South and East Alligator Rivers, Mary River, and the Glyde River. The climate is tropical monsoon with a wet and dry season, bringing the highest rainfall in northern Australia (over 1,200 mm (47 in) per year). Temperatures do not fluctuate widely throughout the year.

There are a number of islands off the Top End coast including the Tiwi Islands (Bathurst Island and Melville Island), and Groote Eylandt as well as many smaller ones.

The region was a hub for Aboriginal trade from as early as 1700, particularly with Makassan seafarers from Sulawesi, which primarily focused on trepang (sea cucumbers).

== Flora ==
Most savanna in Australia is used for grazing livestock, but in this far north, vast areas of grassland are in their original state and dotted with Darwin stringybark and Darwin woollybutt eucalyptus trees; these grasslands are a unique and highly important ecoregion. The sandstone plateau area of the ecoregion is a particularly rich centre of biodiversity supporting a unique heathland flora. The northern Top End is within the Arnhem Land tropical savanna ecoregion. A belt of transitional tropical savannas and woodlands (Carpentaria, Kimberley, and Victoria Plains) lies between the Top End and the semi-arid mulga scrubland, mallee, and sand dunes of Australia's centre. The transition is gradual, and the demarcation line that divides the Top End from the centre is arbitrary.

== Fauna ==
The area is home to unique wildlife. The rivers and estuaries are home to large populations of both saltwater and freshwater crocodiles, as well as bull sharks, sawfish, and dugongs. The wetlands are a rich habitat vital to bird migration and home to large populations of birds, including the world's largest breeding colony of magpie geese, as well as large numbers of rodents and snakes. Endemic species of the Top End include the Woodward's wallaroo, Oenpelli python, chestnut-quilled rock-pigeon, Arnhem Land rock rat, and several species of skinks. Other reptiles include frill-necked lizards and large monitor lizards (known locally as goannas). Snakes include the olive python, death adder (Acanthophis), mulga, water python (Liasis fuscus), and various others. The plateau is home to many of these endemics, especially invertebrates, fish, and frogs, including, for example, hundreds of species of ants. The offshore islands are home to unique subspecies of some of this wildlife.

== Threats and preservation ==
This landscape is well preserved and most of the area is traditionally managed by Aboriginal land trusts, including Kakadu National Park, which is Australia's largest national park and a World Heritage Site. Although some populations have declined, there have been no major extinctions of wildlife in this area. Darwin, though, is a growing city and a base for agriculture and mining, both of which threaten habitats. Introduced plants and animals, such as the water buffalo, are also changing natural habitats, and there has been criticism of the way the local population has changed the fire regimes used to control the bush foliage, in which large areas are burnt each year and allowed to renew.
