= Engaeus urostrictus =

Conservation status
- Vulnerable (IUCN 3.1)

Scientific classification
- Kingdom: Animalia
- Phylum: Arthropoda
- Clade: Pancrustacea
- Class: Malacostraca
- Order: Decapoda
- Suborder: Pleocyemata
- Family: Parastacidae
- Genus: Engaeus
- Species: E. urostrictus

Binomial name
- Engaeus urostrictus Riek, 1969

Species of crayfish

The Dandenong burrowing crayfish (Engaeus urostrictus) is an Australian freshwater crustacean in the Parastacidae family. As its common name suggests, the Dandenong burrowing crayfish is found in the Dandenong Ranges east of Melbourne, Australia.

Engaeus urostrictus is listed as vulnerable on the IUCN Red List of Threatened Species.

== Habitat ==
The Dandenong Burrowing Crayfish occurs in riparian zones characterised by sandy soil flats adjacent to small, slow-flowing headwater streams with high organic content. The Crayfish builds extensive burrow systems with many lateral branches amongst buried, rotting plants and roots of ferns, shrubs and trees. The riparian burrow systems of the species have tunnels which descend to the water table, allowing the crayfish to follow the rise and fall of the water table. The species can form chimneys of excavated soil pellets up to 13 cm high.

== Sources ==
- Doran, N. & Horwitz, P. 2010. Engaeus urostrictus. IUCN Red List of Threatened Species 2010. Retrieved 5 February 2017.
