= Engaeus nulloporius =

Conservation status
- Data Deficient (IUCN 3.1)

Scientific classification
- Kingdom: Animalia
- Phylum: Arthropoda
- Class: Malacostraca
- Order: Decapoda
- Suborder: Pleocyemata
- Family: Parastacidae
- Genus: Engaeus
- Species: E. nulloporius

Binomial name
- Engaeus nulloporius Horwitz, 1990

Species of crayfish

Engaeus nulloporius is a species of crayfish in the family Parastacidae. It is endemic to Australia.

== Sources ==
- Doran, N. and Horwitz, P. 2010. Engaeus nulloporius. The IUCN Red List of Threatened Species 2010. Retrieved 5 February 2017.
