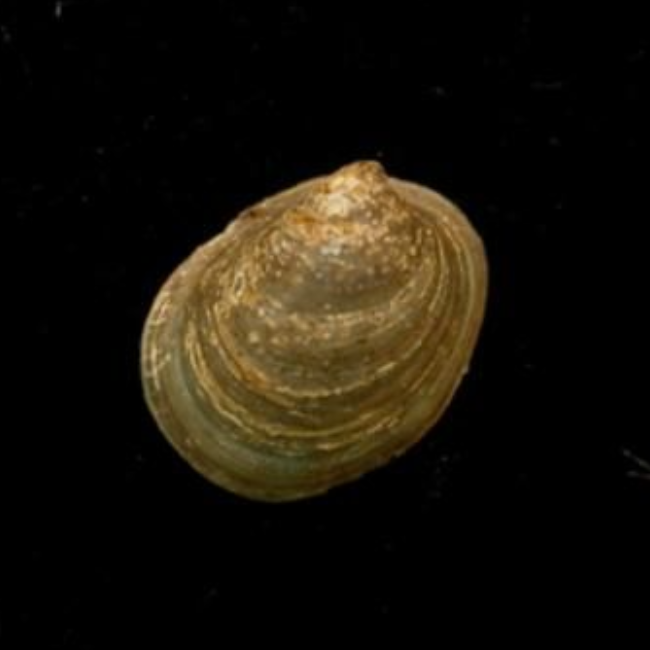

Conservation status
- Critically Endangered (IUCN 2.3)

Scientific classification
- Kingdom: Animalia
- Phylum: Mollusca
- Class: Gastropoda
- Superorder: Hygrophila
- Family: Planorbidae
- Genus: Ancylastrum
- Species: A. cumingianum

Binomial name
- Ancylastrum cumingianum (Bourguignat, 1853)

Synonyms
- Ancylus (Ancylastrum) cumingianus Bourguignat, 1853; superseded combination; Ancylus cumingianus Bourguignat, 1853; superseded combination; Legrandia maddocki (Hanley, 1872); nomen nudum

= Australian freshwater limpet =

Species of gastropod

The Australian freshwater limpet or Tasmanian freshwater limpet, scientific name Ancylastrum cumingianum, is a species of air-breathing freshwater snail with a limpet-like body in the family Planorbidae. It is somewhat large among freshwater limpets, with a curly spire that faces the animal's rear. This species is endemic to bodies of fresh water in the Central Plateau of Tasmania, where it is considered Critically Endangered. It faces threats of predation by trout, which were introduced to the area by humans.

== Taxonomy ==
Contrary to its common names, the Australian freshwater limpet is not a true limpet, instead classified in the family Planorbidae.

This species was originally described in 1853 by the malacologist Jules René Bourguignat, and was given the name Ancylus (Ancylastrum) cumingianus. In 1872, the species was described again under the name Legrandia maddocki, named after William Legrand. However, in 1894, it was found that this new name was invalid, as the species was equivalent to Bourguignat's 1853 description. The species was historically included in the family (now subfamily) Ancylidae before its eventual move to the Miratestinae.

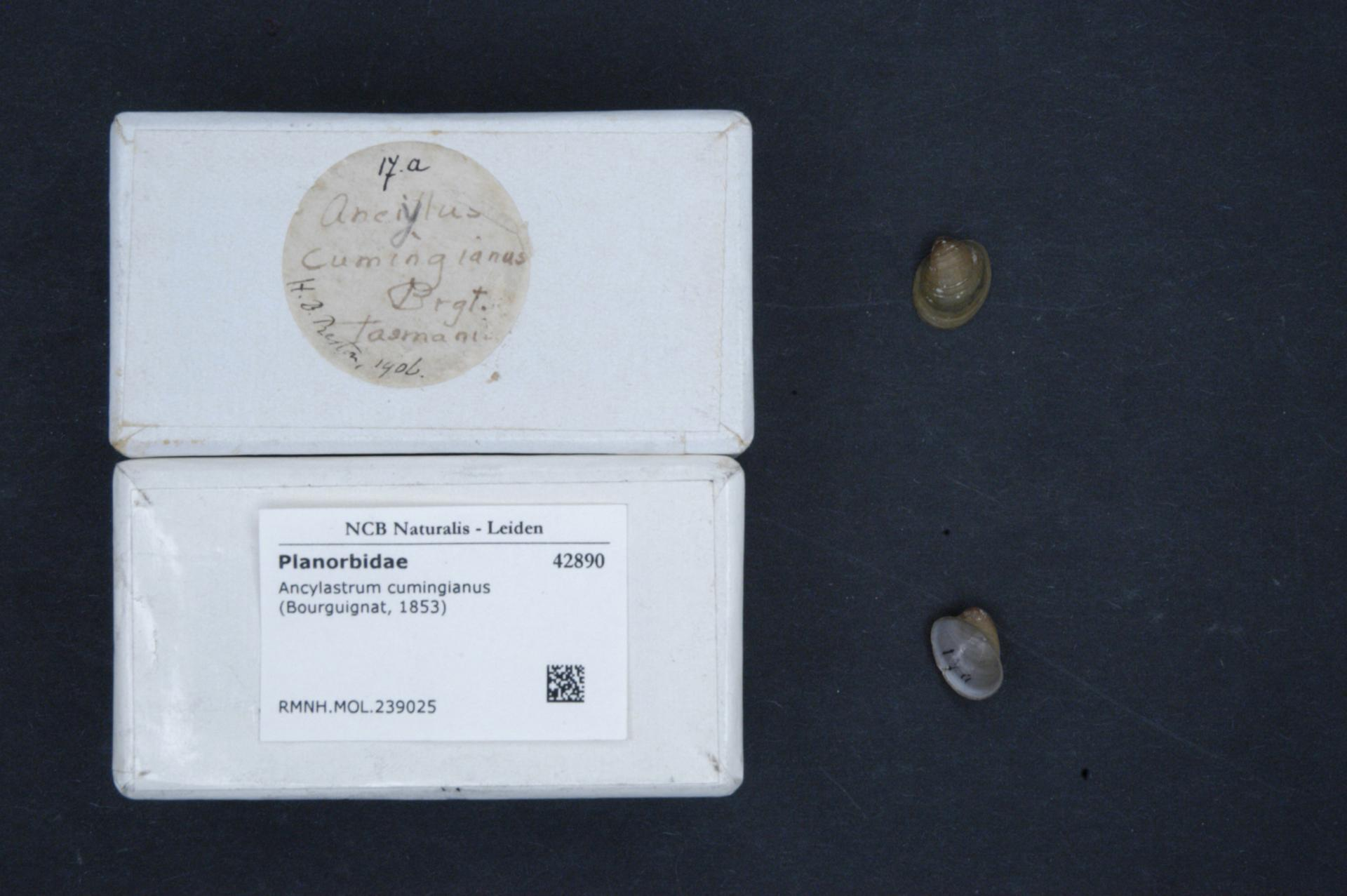
Museum specimen from the Regional Museum of Natural History, India

Some sources consider Ancylastrum irvinae to be the same species as A. cumingianum, though many others do not. This may contribute to misidentifications among museum specimens. Two specimens from Bourguignat's 1853 description are known: the holotype (primary specimen) and one syntype (secondary specimen). The holotype is in the collections of the Australian Museum, while the syntype is in the Natural History Museum in London.

== Description ==
=== Shell description ===
Ancylastrum cumingianum is relatively large for a freshwater limpet, measuring 6 to 7 mm (0.24 to 0.28 in) in length, 5 to 5.5 mm (0.20 to 0.22 in) in width, and 2.5 to 3 mm (0.098 to 0.118 in) in height. Some specimens, however, have been recorded at nearly double these dimensions. Still, this species is smaller than its cousin Ancylastrum irvinae. The Australian freshwater limpet has a limpet-like (patelliform) shell where the convex part of the shell is the front of the animal, and the concave part the back. The shell is thin and translucent, appearing greenish brown or yellow on the top and white inside. The top of the shell (apex) is actually a highly reduced spire, curling downwards and bending asymmetrically to the right.

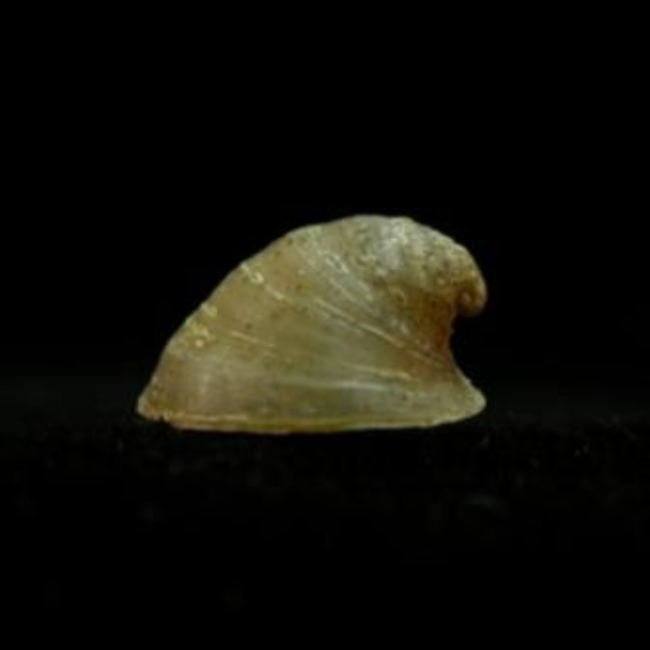
The greenish shell and curled spire of the species. The front of the animal faces to the left

The number of shell revolutions (whorls) may be below one, or as many as two. The spire may have inconspicuous raised spiralling lines (striae). The transition from the spire to the rest of the shell is very pronounced, as the shell's main body is mostly smooth, only displaying growth lines and sometimes poorly developed ribs. The lack of strong ribs on the body may distinguish this species from A. irvinae.

=== Other characteristics ===
The radula (toothed tongue-like organ) has a central (rachidian) tooth with two cusps, where the cusps are straight on their inner side and curved on their outer side. On each side of the central tooth exist several serrated lateral teeth, bordered further by tricuspid marginal teeth.

The male reproductive tract of this species is also useful for distinguishing species. Flagella may be found at the junction between the penis sheath and the vas deferens. The penis of A. cumingianum is not branched, and possesses a stylet at the tip. This distinguishes it from the branched penis of A. irvinae.

== Distribution and conservation ==
The Australian freshwater limpet is endemic to central Tasmania, Australia. It has been recorded in streams near New Norfolk, Hamilton, tributaries of the Derwent River, and the Great Lake. The species may also be found in Lake St. Clair. Other sources suggest that the species is restricted exclusively to deep water within the Great Lake.

This species was listed as Critically Endangered by the IUCN in 1996. It faces threats of poor water quality and predation by introduced trout. In 2015, water levels in the Great Lake dropped significantly, causing a mass casualty of Ancylastrum. A search was made, but found only two individuals of A. cumingianus. The water in the lake was refilled in 2017, and in 2021, a total of 14 individuals were found across two sites.

== Ecology ==
The Australian freshwater limpet, like the other Ancylastrum species, lays gelatinous, spiralling egg masses on rocks or wood. Each mass contains between one and three eggs each. The breeding period for this species (and the genus as a whole) is hypothesized to be restricted to October through March.

In laboratory conditions, this species seemed to prefer lower light, hiding during daylight hours. Eggs were produced, though no embryos survived to hatch.

This species occurs alongside the other Ancylastrum species, Ancylastrum irvinae. This snail is predated upon by introduced trout, and carcasses have been observed to be eaten by flatworms.
