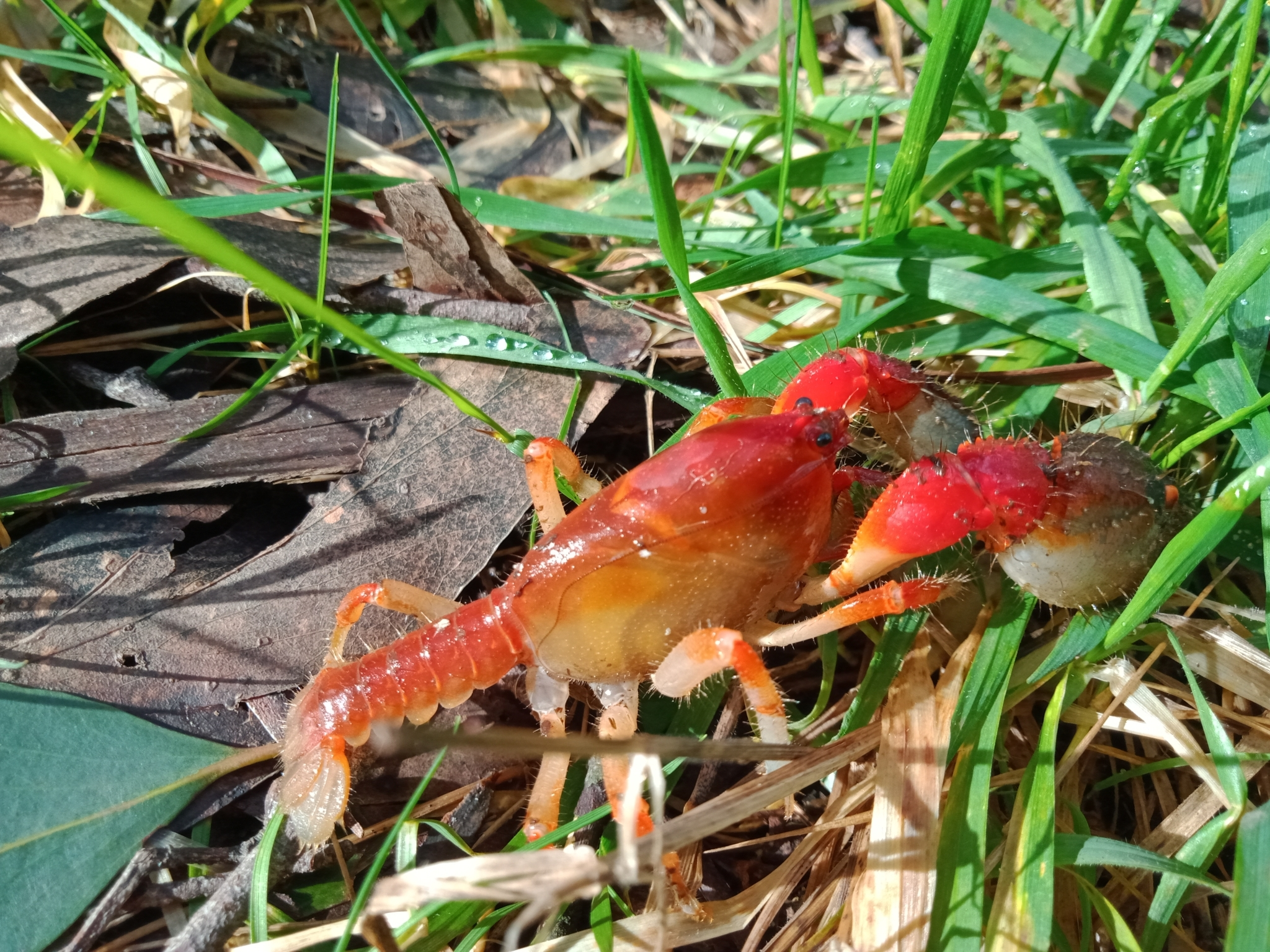
- Engaeus affinis

Scientific classification
- Kingdom: Animalia
- Phylum: Arthropoda
- Clade: Pancrustacea
- Class: Malacostraca
- Order: Decapoda
- Suborder: Pleocyemata
- Family: Parastacidae
- Genus: Engaeus; Erichson, 1846

Type species
- Astacus fossor Erichson, 1846

= Engaeus =

Genus of crayfishes

Engaeus is a genus of freshwater crayfish found in Australia, the burrowing crayfishes. Sixteen of the 36 species in the genus occur in Tasmania, where they are known as the Tasmanian land crayfishes. The behaviour of these crayfish is notable as they live in burrows and construct large "chimneys" at the opening.

The burrowing crayfish, in the genus Engaeus, are primarily found in Tasmania with 14 out of 16 species being endemic to the state with the other two species located in Victoria as well as Tasmania. The Engaeus genus is a highly specialized form of freshwater crayfish which is capable of living in tunnel systems in peaty, muddy or wetland environments with the burrows extending down to the water table (an underground level which defines the transition between water saturated ground and non-saturated ground such as the surface) where the water is generally constant.

== Description ==
The burrowing crayfish spend their entire life cycle underground in tunnel systems, only coming to the surface during wet, overcast conditions and during the night. As the burrowing crayfish has evolved from a free-swimming organism to a terrestrial organism, many of the species have a reduced tail, a narrow body (which can grow up to 10 cm long) and claws that open vertically allowing for enlarged claws in a confined space. This feature, the vertically opening claws, is distinctive of the Tasmanian species and will not be observed in the two species shared between Victoria and Tasmania. The burrowing crayfish can range in colour from orange, reddish-brown, grey-blue or purple.

Breeding for the Engaeus genus takes place between spring and summer. During this period, females can be observed carrying large, orange coloured eggs or hatchlings under her tail which folds over to form a pocket structure for protection. The majority of the species in this genus consume rotting wood, detritus, root material and animal matter such as grubs and worms if they encounter them.

== Habitat ==
Although burrowing crayfish do not typically live in open water, they still possess gills underneath their carapace (the hardened section of the dorsal exoskeleton observed in arthropods) concluding that the burrowing crayfish is still dependent on an aquatic environment to respire. Therefore, there are three different types of burrowing systems with different mechanisms to stay wet. A type 1 burrow is a burrow which is directly connected to a stream or lake, a type 2 burrow is a burrow which extends down to connect with the water table (extending further down in summer and may rise again during winter) and type 3 is a burrowing system which relies heavily on run off. The type 3 burrowing system is characteristic of the Engaeus genus, classifying them as the most terrestrial genus of all the burrowing crayfish. The burrowing crayfish typically occupy environments which are wet, muddy or peaty environments such as wetlands, swamps, floodplains of small streams, sedge-land or in rainforests. As the Engaeus genus dispersal using water ways is limited due to their terrestrial nature, local speciation rates may be high.

A characteristic feature of the genus, Engaeus, is that the entrance of their burrows typically has a ‘chimney’ structure constructed out of balls of mud. The structure can be only a few mud balls or can be as big as 40 cm in height, although this behaviour is seen in the entire genus, it is unknown why the burrowing crayfish do this. Additionally, during hot periods, the crayfish will plug the chimney, potentially to retain as much moisture as possible in their tunnelling systems.

== Distribution ==
Engaeus distribution

The genus of Engaeus is typically found in the north and west of Tasmania but can also be observed occurring in the north-east. This genus has geographical territories that differ in size with some species having extensive areas of distribution while others only have very limited areas. Most species border each other, creating a distribution pattern similar to a puzzle. However, it is not common for the distribution of the species in this genus to overlap, though it does occur in rare circumstances. Doran (2000) states that there are four species of conservation concern due to a decrease in their distribution, these species include E. orramakunna (the Mt. Arthur burrowing crayfish), E. spinicaudatus (the Scottsdale burrowing crayfish), E. yabbimunna (the Burnie burrowing crayfish) and E. martigener (the Furneaux burrowing crayfish)

== Threats ==
Threats for the Engaeus genus, especially E. orramakunna - the Mt. Arthur burrowing crayfish, E. spinicaudatus - the Scottsdale burrowing crayfish, E. yabbimunna - the Burnie burrowing crayfish and E. martigener - the Furneaux burrowing crayfish, due to their threatened status include:

- Agricultural processes including grazing of livestock which results in compacted or disturbed soil, construction of dams, clearance of native vegetation and ploughing.
- Forestry activities such as the creation of plantations through the clearing and burning of natural vegetation, which causes significant disturbance to streamways or natural seepages that may be occupying burrowing crayfish.
- Urban developments including the creation of roads and drain ways, pollution of waterways and the removal of habitat.
- Introduction of invasive species which may lead to competition for food and habitat, predation or the introduction of parasites that were not there previously.

All of these activities impact on the quality of water, vegetation and soil quality and therefore create undesirable environments for the burrowing crayfish to inhabit. These activities are detrimental to the genus long term, they are significantly more damaging during periods where the burrowing crayfish are vulnerable such as during moulting, breeding, on the surface or caring for offspring.

All (except one recently described) of the 36 species of Engaeus have been assessed for the IUCN Red List:

Data deficient

- Engaeus affinis Smith & Schuster, 1913
- Engaeus curvisuturus Horwitz, 1990
- Engaeus karnanga Horwitz, 1990
- Engaeus laevis (Clark, 1941)
- Engaeus nulloporius Horwitz, 1990

See also the more recently described.

- Engaeus excavator Richardson, 2024

Critically endangered

- Engaeus granulatus Horwitz, 1990 – central north burrowing crayfish
- Engaeus mallacoota Horwitz, 1990 – Mallacoota burrowing crayfish
- Engaeus spinicaudatus Horwitz, 1990 – Scottsdale burrowing crayfish
- Engaeus sternalis (Clark, 1936) – Warragul burrowing crayfish

Endangered species

- Engaeus disjuncticus Horwitz, 1990
- Engaeus martigener Horwitz, 1990 – Furneaux burrowing crayfish
- Engaeus phyllocercus Smith & Schuster, 1913 – Narracan burrowing crayfish

Vulnerable species

- Engaeus rostrogaleatus Horwitz, 1990 – Strzelecki burrowing crayfish
- Engaeus urostrictus Riek, 1969
- Engaeus yabbimunna Horwitz, 1994 – Burnie burrowing crayfish

Near threatened

- Engaeus australis Riek, 1969 – lilly pilly burrowing crayfish
- Engaeus orramakunna Horwitz, 1990 – Mount Arthur burrowing crayfish
- Engaeus victoriensis Smith & Schuster, 1913

Least concern

- Engaeus cisternarius Suter, 1977
- Engaeus cunicularius (Erichson, 1846)
- Engaeus cymus (Clark, 1936)
- Engaeus fossor (Erichson, 1846)
- Engaeus fultoni Smith & Schuster, 1913
- Engaeus hemicirratulus Smith & Schuster, 1913
- Engaeus lengana Horwitz, 1990
- Engaeus leptorhynchus Clark, 1936
- Engaeus lyelli (Clark, 1936)
- Engaeus mairener Horwitz, 1990
- Engaeus merosetosus Horwitz, 1990
- Engaeus orientalis Clark, 1941
- Engaeus quadrimanus Clark, 1936
- Engaeus sericatus Clark, 1936
- Engaeus strictifrons (Clark, 1936)
- Engaeus tayatea Horwitz, 1990
- Engaeus tuberculatus Clark, 1936
