= Draculoides bramstokeri =

Scientific classification
- Kingdom: Animalia
- Phylum: Arthropoda
- Subphylum: Chelicerata
- Class: Arachnida
- Order: Schizomida
- Family: Hubbardiidae
- Genus: Draculoides
- Species: D. bramstokeri

Binomial name
- Draculoides bramstokeri Harvey & Humphreys, 1995

Species of whip scorpion

Draculoides bramstokeri is a small, troglobite, Australian arachnid. Often mistaken for a spider, D. bramstokeri is a schizomid — a small, soil-dwelling invertebrate that walks on six legs and uses two modified front legs as feelers. It uses large fang-like pedipalps, or pincers, to grasp invertebrate prey and crunch it into pieces before sucking out the juices. Named for this method of dispatching victims and after Bram Stoker, the author of Dracula.

The species is light yellow or brown, 5 mm long and known to inhabit six caves on Barrow Island and two on the North West Cape in Western Australia. It is threatened by pollution and damage to caves and is vulnerable to extinction. Draculoides bramstokeri was first described in 1995.

The other three described species of Draculoides also occur in Australia.

== See also ==
- Threatened fauna of Australia
- List of organisms named after famous people (born 1800–1899)
