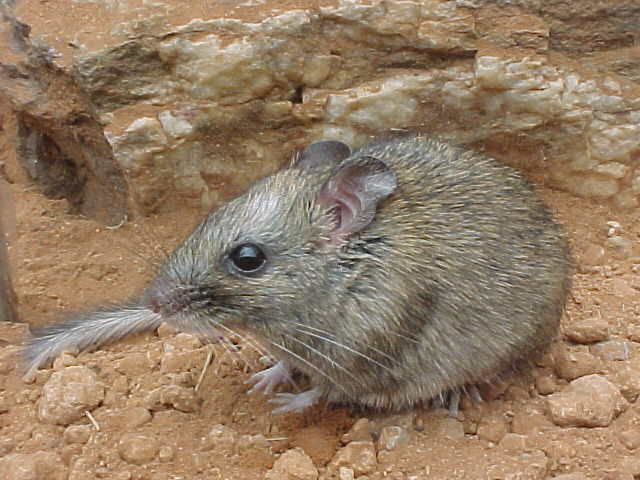
- The Central rock rat (Zyzomys pedunculatus)

Scientific classification
- Kingdom: Animalia
- Phylum: Chordata
- Class: Mammalia
- Order: Rodentia
- Family: Muridae
- Subfamily: Murinae
- Tribe: Hydromyini
- Genus: Zyzomys; Thomas, 1909

Type species
- Mus argurus

Species
- Zyzomys argurus Zyzomys maini Zyzomys palatilis Zyzomys pedunculatus Zyzomys woodwardi

= Zyzomys =

Zyzomys Temporal range: Late Pliocene - Recent

Genus of rodents

Zyzomys is a genus of rodents with unusually thick, long tails. Five species of the genus are known in Australia, where they are called rock rats or thick-tailed rats. The genus was classified by Michael Rogers Oldfield Thomas in 1909.

== Taxonomy ==
There are five known species of rock-rat. The central rock rat (Zyzomys pedunculatus) was once believed to be extinct until rediscovered in 1996.

- Silver-tailed rock rat, Zyzomys argurus
- Arnhem Land rock rat, Zyzomys maini
- Carpentarian rock rat, Zyzomys palatilis
- Central rock rat, Zyzomys pedunculatus
- Kimberley rock rat, Zyzomys woodwardi
