= Engaeus karnanga =

Conservation status
- Data Deficient (IUCN 3.1)

Scientific classification
- Kingdom: Animalia
- Phylum: Arthropoda
- Class: Malacostraca
- Order: Decapoda
- Suborder: Pleocyemata
- Family: Parastacidae
- Genus: Engaeus
- Species: E. karnanga

Binomial name
- Engaeus karnanga Horwitz, 1990

Species of crayfish

Engaeus karnanga is a species of crayfish in the family Parastacidae. It is endemic to Australia.

== Sources ==
- Doran, N. & Horwitz, P. 2010. Engaeus karnanga. IUCN Red List of Threatened Species 2010. Retrieved February 5, 2017.
