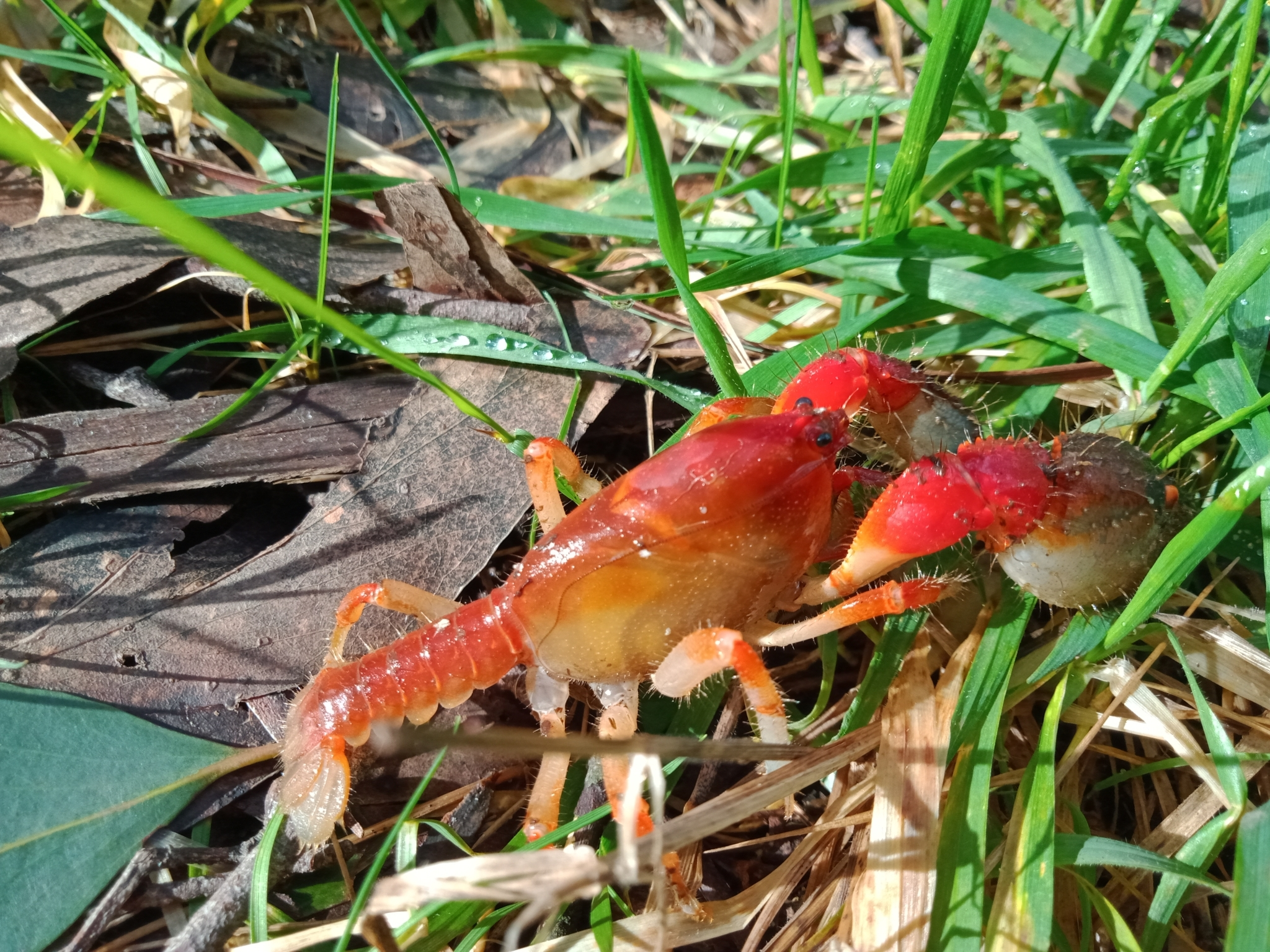

Conservation status
- Data Deficient (IUCN 3.1)

Scientific classification
- Kingdom: Animalia
- Phylum: Arthropoda
- Class: Malacostraca
- Order: Decapoda
- Suborder: Pleocyemata
- Family: Parastacidae
- Genus: Engaeus
- Species: E. affinis

Binomial name
- Engaeus affinis Smith & Schuster, 1913

= Engaeus affinis =

Species of crayfish

Engaeus affinis is a species of crayfish in the family Parastacidae. It is endemic to Australia.
