= Arnhem Land rock rat =

Conservation status
- Vulnerable (IUCN 3.1)

Scientific classification
- Kingdom: Animalia
- Phylum: Chordata
- Class: Mammalia
- Order: Rodentia
- Family: Muridae
- Genus: Zyzomys
- Species: Z. maini

Binomial name
- Zyzomys maini Kitchener, 1989.

Species of rodent

The Arnhem Land rock rat (Zyzomys maini) also known as the Arnhem rock-rat and by the Indigenous Australian name of kodjperr is a species of rodent in the family Muridae. It is found only in the Top End Region of the Northern Territory in Australia.

== Taxonomy ==
The description of the species was published by Darrell Kitchener in 1989, emerging from a revision of the genus Zyzomys. The holotype was an adult female, collected near Ja Ja Billabong in the Northern Territory, amongst some large boulders at outlying sandstone near a creek. The specific epithet maini was a tribute by the authors upon the retirement of Bert Main from the zoology department of the University of Western Australia.

== Description ==
The rat typically grows to a size of 15 centimetres (6 in) in length with a mass of 100 to 150 grams (4 to 5 oz). It can be distinguished from other local rodents by its long whiskers, swollen tail and Roman nose.

It is an entirely terrestrial and nocturnal species, with a diet that consists mainly of seeds, fruit and some other vegetable matter. The rat will cache large seeds or at least move them to sites where it is safe to eat. It is able to breed all year round but females are rarely found to be pregnant late in the dry season.

== Distribution and habitat ==
Endemic to the sandstone massif of western Arnhem Land, the population is highly fragmented as a result of the topographic complexity of the deeply dissected plateau. The preferred vegetation for the rat is monsoonal rainforest which is found patched throughout the landscape. The total area of occupancy is estimated to be from 100 to 1,000 square kilometres (39 to 386 sq mi).

== Conservation ==
The species is listed as near threatened with the IUCN, although the population of the species is in decline. Approximately 30% of the population is found within Kakadu National Park.
