= Carpentarian rock rat =

Conservation status
- Critically Endangered (IUCN 3.1)

Scientific classification
- Kingdom: Animalia
- Phylum: Chordata
- Class: Mammalia
- Order: Rodentia
- Family: Muridae
- Genus: Zyzomys
- Species: Z. palatalis

Binomial name
- Zyzomys palatalis Kitchener, 1989.

Species of rodent

The Carpentarian rock rat (Zyzomys palatalis) is a species of rodent in the family Muridae. It is found only in Australia.

== Taxonomy ==
The description of the species was published by Darrell Kitchener in 1989, emerging from a revision of the genus Zyzomys. The holotype was a pregnant female, collected at Wollogorang Station, in a deep ravine called Echo Gorge. The sandstone environment of the type location was an association of plants that included Eucalyptus dichromophloia. The specific epithet palatis is derived from Latin, and refers to the characteristic morphology of their palate.

== Description ==
It is a small and compact murine rodent. Its fur is grey-brown above and pale below. The tail is used to store fat at its base, making it carrot-shaped; the skin of the tail is fragile and easily damaged by handling. The average weight of individuals is about 120 g (4.2 oz).

== Distribution and habitat ==
It has a very limited range, being currently known from only five localities within the Wollogorang Station pastoral lease of the Northern Territory, close to the border with Queensland, near the Gulf of Carpentaria. Crucial habitat characteristics are rugged sandstone gorges with a cover of dry monsoon vine-thicket or tropical woodland, and with access to permanent water.

== Conservation ==
The estimated size of the wild population of this species is less than 2000. The main threat is from hot, late dry-season, fires. It is classified as being Critically Endangered. It is subject to conservation management, including a captive breeding program at the Territory Wildlife Park. The captive colony from the Territory Wildlife Park has aided in a small study performed to improve health assessments of captive and wild Carpentarian rock rat populations.
