= Engaeus spinicaudatus =

Conservation status
- Critically Endangered (IUCN 3.1)

Scientific classification
- Kingdom: Animalia
- Phylum: Arthropoda
- Class: Malacostraca
- Order: Decapoda
- Suborder: Pleocyemata
- Family: Parastacidae
- Genus: Engaeus
- Species: E. spinicaudatus

Binomial name
- Engaeus spinicaudatus Horwitz, 1990

Species of crustacean

Engaeus spinicaudatus, the Scottsdale burrowing crayfish, is a species of crayfish in the family Parastacidae. This species is only found in Tasmania, Australia. It is a medium-size burrowing crayfish with an adult carapace length of about 25 millimeters. It usually brown or purplish in color. The species is primarily found in wet buttongrass and healthy plains, but also occurs in surface seepages, floodplains of creeks and wet areas converted to pasture.

== Threats ==
The principal threats to this species are clearance of native vegetation and lowering of the water table as a result of forestry and agricultural activities. Other threats include downstream effects and road construction and quarrying and the impacts of inappropriate fire management.

== Sources ==
- Doran, N. & Horwitz, P. 2010. Engaeus spinicaudatus. IUCN Red List of Threatened Species 2010. Retrieved 5 February 2017.
