= Arthurs paragalaxias =

Conservation status
- Endangered (IUCN 3.1)

Scientific classification
- Kingdom: Animalia
- Phylum: Chordata
- Class: Actinopterygii
- Division: Teleostei
- Order: Galaxiiformes
- Family: Galaxiidae
- Genus: Paragalaxias
- Species: P. mesotes

Binomial name
- Paragalaxias mesotes McDowall & Fulton, 1978
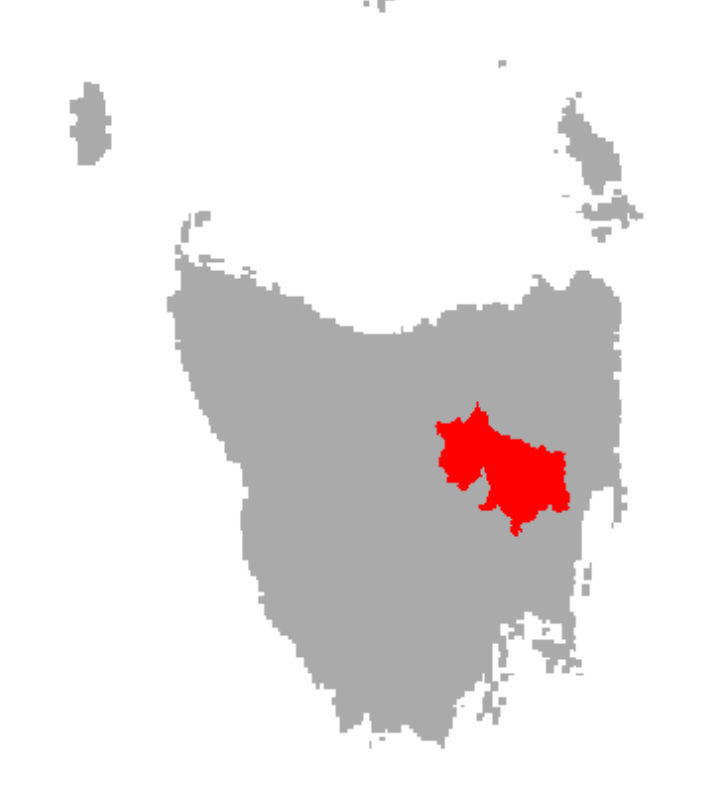

Species of ray-finned fish

Arthurs galaxias (Paragalaxias mesotes) is a species of ray-finned fish in the family Galaxiidae. It is endemic to Tasmania in Australia.

It is found at Arthurs Lake (Tasmania), Lake Woods and Lake River near Woods Lake dam, in the Central Highlands (Tasmania).

It is one of the species considered in the 2006 Threatened Tasmanian Galaxiidae recovery programme.
