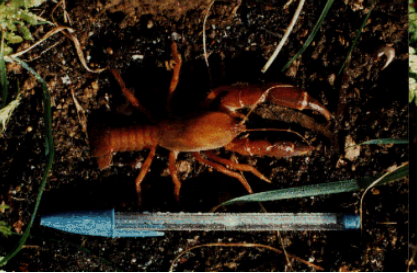
- Mount Arthur burrowing crayfish, image taken by Niall Doran

Conservation status
- Near Threatened (IUCN 3.1)

Scientific classification
- Kingdom: Animalia
- Phylum: Arthropoda
- Clade: Pancrustacea
- Class: Malacostraca
- Order: Decapoda
- Suborder: Pleocyemata
- Family: Parastacidae
- Genus: Engaeus
- Species: E. orramakunna

Binomial name
- Engaeus orramakunna Horwitz, 1990
- Distribution map of Engaeus species

= Engaeus orramakunna =

Species of crayfish

Engaeus orramakunna, the Mount Arthur burrowing crayfish, is a species of crayfish in the family Parastacidae. It is endemic to Tasmania.

== Description ==
As with similar species within the genus Engaeus, Engaeus orramakunna have a reduced tail length due to less swimming activity. They also have a narrow body and vertically opened claws to the body, as opposed to horizontally to make room in narrow tunnels.

Colouration of the species can differ from orange to reddish brown, to grey-blue or purple. Apart from other species in the same genus, they lack a transverse suture across the outer parts their uropods.

== Distribution ==
The distribution of Engaeus orramakunna is mainly at Mount Arthur. The species is distributed across Nabowla to the north, South Springfield to the east, and Lilydale to the west. The species has also been spotted as far south as Launceston.

== Habitat and ecology ==
Engaeus orramakunna are found in moist seeps, flat swamps or marshes feeding into or next to streams and rivers, stream banks, culverts and roadside drains.

The burrows of the species are commonly found alongside multiple plant species such as Dicksonia antarctica (soft tree fern), Leptospermum (tea-trees), Melaleuca (paperbacks) and Eucalypt species, Pinus radiata (radiata pines) and Atherosperma moschatum (southern sassafrass).

== Conservation ==
The species has legal protection under the EPBC Act and Tasmania's Threatened Species Protection Act.
