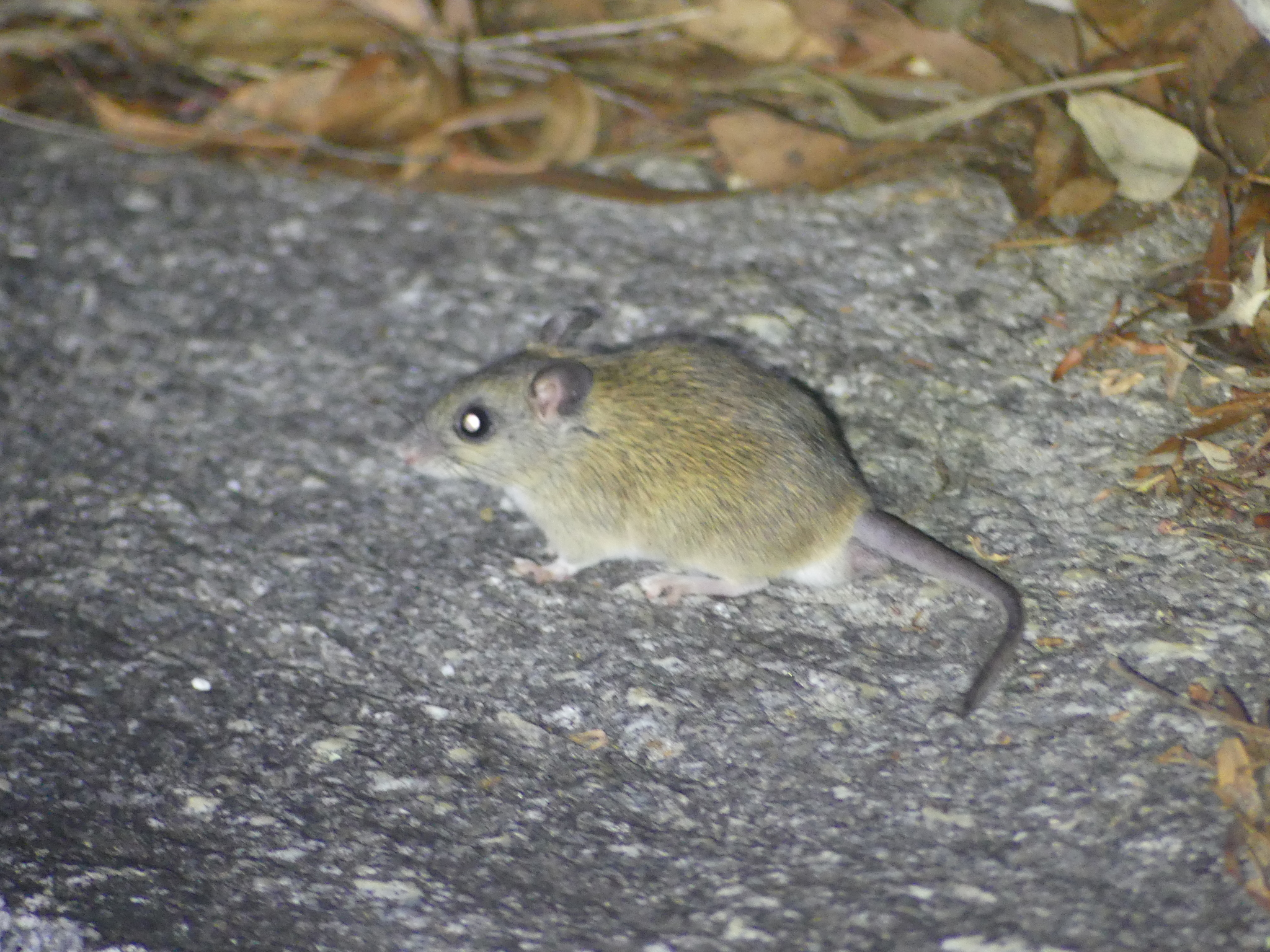

Conservation status
- Least Concern (IUCN 3.1)

Scientific classification
- Kingdom: Animalia
- Phylum: Chordata
- Class: Mammalia
- Order: Rodentia
- Family: Muridae
- Genus: Zyzomys
- Species: Z. argurus

Binomial name
- Zyzomys argurus (Thomas, 1889)

= Common rock rat =

Species of rodent

The common rock rat (Zyzomys argurus) is a species of rodent in the family Muridae. It is found only in Australia, where it lives in the rocky areas of woodlands, grasslands and low open forests, particularly on the talus, or scree, of cliff slopes. As a nocturnal animal, it spends the daytime nesting in cool rock crevices. Direct exposure to the sun can quickly result in heat stroke and death.

The rock rat is an overall golden brown with white belly. It can weigh anywhere 25–65 grams (0.88–2.29 oz), with a head to body length of 85–140 millimetres (3.3–5.5 in). The thick tail is 90–125 millimetres (3.5–4.9 in) long and contains fat deposits. The tail is covered in overlapping scales and sparse hairs. The skin of the tail can easily be pulled off, allowing the animal to escape predators in some situations (this function is similar to that of lizard tail autotomy).

They are sexually mature at 5 to 6 months of age. The females have 4 nipples but litters average 2 to 3 offspring. Gestation is about 35 days. By the 10th day, the offspring are covered in fur, and by the 12th day their eyes are open. They are weaned by 4 weeks of age. The life span of the Common Rock Rat in the wild is unknown, but an age of 4.2 years in captivity has been reported.

Their diet consists of plant matter, grasses, seeds, fungi and insects. One was observed in Maguk, Kakadu National Park, tucking into a plate of custard and rice pudding that someone had left unattended (Goodfellow, Fauna of Kakadu and the Top End, 1993).
