= Paragalaxias =

Scientific classification
- Kingdom: Animalia
- Phylum: Chordata
- Class: Actinopterygii
- Order: Galaxiiformes
- Family: Galaxiidae
- Subfamily: Galaxiinae
- Genus: Paragalaxias; E. O. G. Scott, 1935

Species
- See text
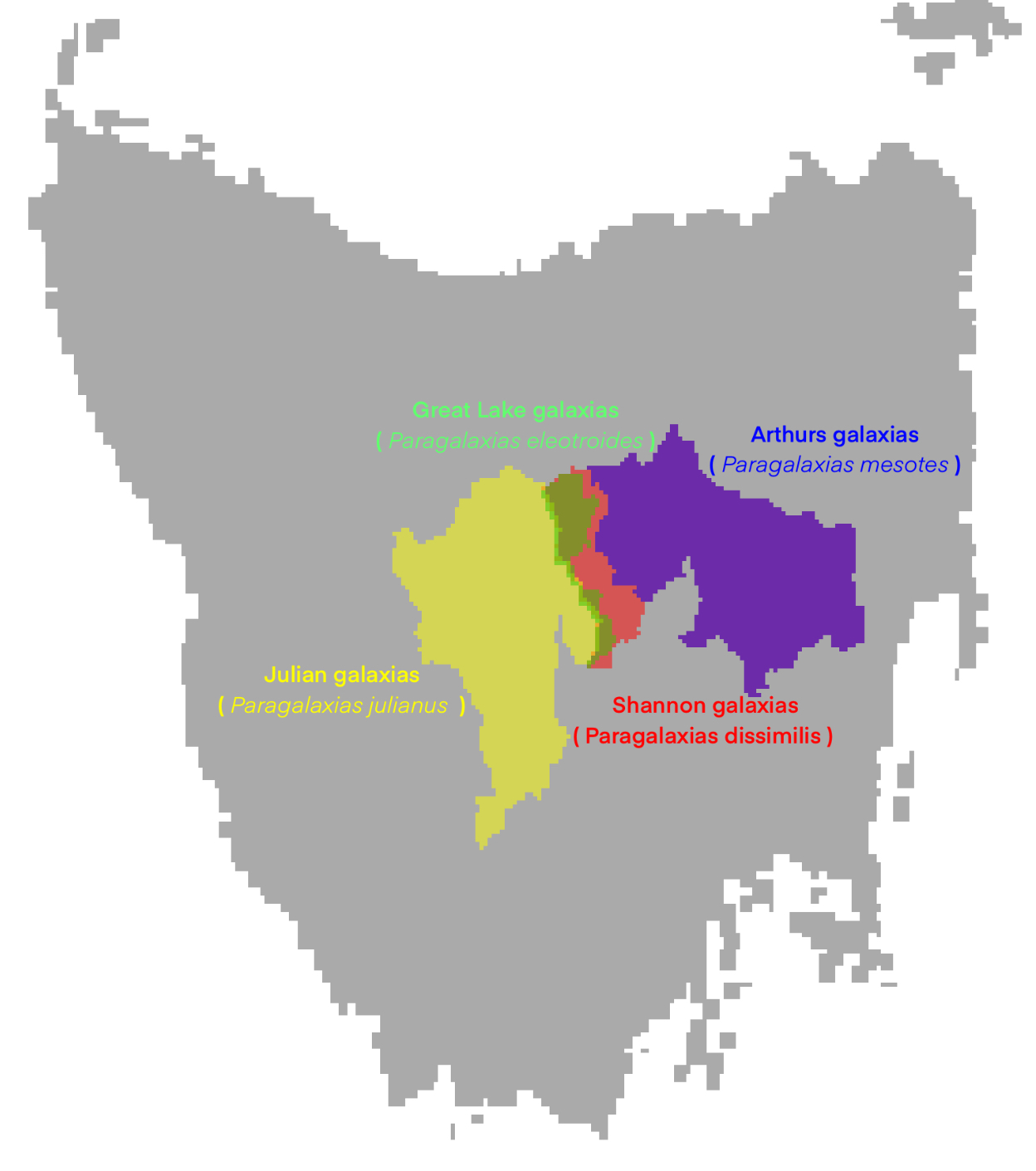

Genus of ray-finned fishes

Paragalaxias is a genus of freshwater ray-finned fish of the family Galaxiidae, endemic to the Central Highlands of Tasmania.

== Species ==
There are currently four recognized species in this genus:

- Paragalaxias dissimilis (Regan, 1906) (Shannon galaxias)
- Paragalaxias eleotroides (McDowall & Fulton, 1978) (Great Lake darter)
- Paragalaxias julianus (McDowall & Fulton, 1978) (Julian galaxias)
- Paragalaxias mesotes (McDowall & Fulton, 1978) (Arthurs paragalaxias)
