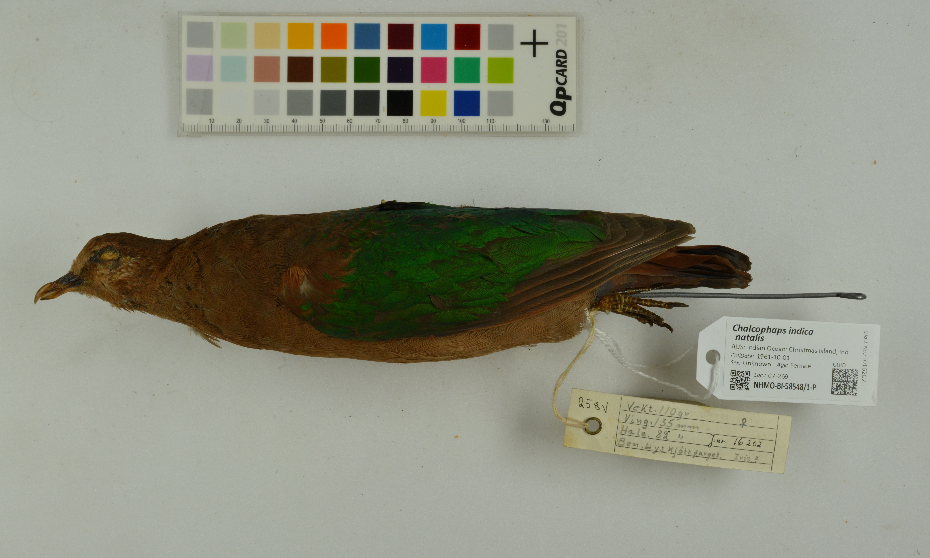

Conservation status
- Endangered (EPBC Act)

Scientific classification
- Kingdom: Animalia
- Phylum: Chordata
- Class: Aves
- Order: Columbiformes
- Family: Columbidae
- Genus: Chalcophaps
- Species: C. indica
- Subspecies: C. i. natalis

Trinomial name
- Chalcophaps indica natalis Lister, 1889

Synonyms
- Chalcophaps natalis

= Christmas emerald dove =

Subspecies of bird

The Christmas emerald dove (Chalcophaps indica natalis), also known as the Christmas green-winged pigeon, is a bird in the pigeon family, Columbidae. It is a distinctive subspecies of the common emerald dove that is endemic to Christmas Island, an Australian territory in the eastern Indian Ocean.

== Description ==
The Christmas emerald dove is a small brownish pigeon with green wings. It is some 23–26 cm long, with a 43–46 cm wingspan and a weight of 80-135 g. It is smaller than the mainland Australian subspecies of the dove and differs from them by the adult male having a contrasting light grey cap, with a prominent white forehead, white supercilium extending behind the eye, and a mainly rufous-brown shoulder patch with only a narrow white line along the edge. The adult female has a darker, red-brown head, neck and underparts, lacking the grey and white on the head as well as the pale shoulder patch.

== Distribution and habitat ==
The dove is restricted to the 137 km^{2} Christmas Island where it is common in the tropical rainforest that covers 75% of the island, as well as other terrestrial habitats there, including regrowth forest and settled areas.

== Behaviour ==
The doves are commonly seen in pairs, often on the ground or in low trees.

=== Breeding ===
The dove breeds mainly between October and February, building a frail nest of twigs in tree or bush and laying a clutch of two glossy, cream-coloured eggs. Incubation takes at least 17 days, with the chicks remaining in the nest for another 12 to 16 days after hatching. .

=== Feeding ===
The dove forages mainly on the ground, feeding on seeds and fallen fruits.

== Status and conservation ==
In 1988 the population was estimated at 1000 pairs. Garnett & Crowley (2000) considered the dove, along with a suite of Christmas Island's other endemics, as critically endangered, with the principal threat coming from the yellow crazy ants which were accidentally introduced to the island. The threat is not only that of direct ant predation of nestlings, but also indirectly from potentially massive changes to the ecology of the island caused by the ants. Under the Environment Protection and Biodiversity Conservation Act 1999 it is listed as endangered.
