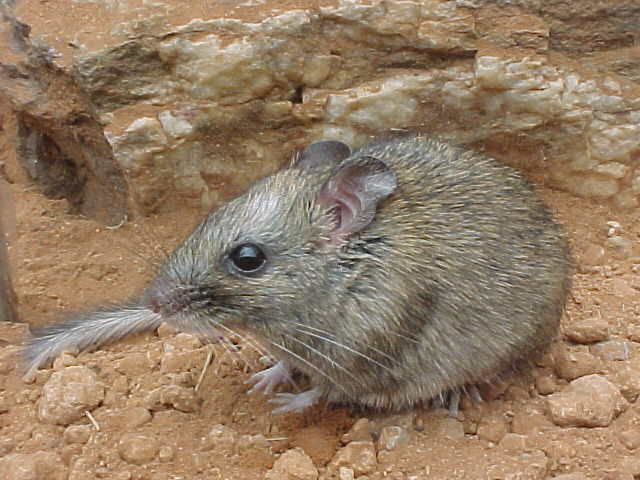

Conservation status
- Critically Endangered (IUCN 3.1)
- CITES Appendix II

Scientific classification
- Kingdom: Animalia
- Phylum: Chordata
- Class: Mammalia
- Infraclass: Placentalia
- Order: Rodentia
- Family: Muridae
- Genus: Zyzomys
- Species: Z. pedunculatus

Binomial name
- Zyzomys pedunculatus (Waite, 1896)
- geographic range

= Central rock rat =

Species of rodent

The central rock rat (Zyzomys pedunculatus), also known as the central thick-tailed rock-rat, Macdonnell Range rock-rat, and Australian native mouse, is a critically endangered species of rodent in the family Muridae, endemic to Australia.

It was first described as Conilurus pedunculatus in 1896 by E.R. Waite.

== Description ==
The central rock rat is one of five rock rat species native to Australia. It is a nocturnal species that forages for food at nighttime. They can range from 10.6 to 14.9 cm (4.2 to 5.9 in) long for the head and body, and around 30 cm (12 in) from head to tail. They weigh between 50 and 120 g (1.8 and 4.2 oz). Their fur is a light mustard above with a pale underbelly. The lightly furred tail is the most noticeable feature of the central rock rat. The tail base is thick and bulky. The thickness of the tail has been reported to be a fat storage adaptation, an effect of scarce food distribution. Rock rats are known to lose their tails, fur and skin very easily and are, therefore, known to be difficult to handle. As for their birthrate, captive animals have bred and have had litters of various sizes, ranging from one to four young.

== Distribution and habitat ==
The rats have been found in rocky outcrops and on mountainsides with loose stones, as well as hilly grasslands and low open shrubland or woodland. Historically, the central rock rat is only known to be found in a 77 km (48 mi) stretch of the West MacDonnell Ranges, Northern Territory. The species has previously been recorded from living animals or cave deposits in Northern Territory at Uluru-Kata Tjuta National Park, Illamurta (James Range), Haasts Bluff (West MacDonnell Ranges), Mount Liebig, Napperby Station, Devils Marbles, The Granites (Tanami Desert), and the Davenport Range National Park. It is known from cave deposits in the Cape Range National Park.

== Believed extinction ==
The species was believed to be extinct in both 1990 and 1994 due to population decline. In 2001 individuals were trapped from fourteen locations, but in 2002 drought and wildfire struck the area and the species was not recorded after that. It has been classed as Critically Endangered by the IUCN Red List. In 2013 they were also discovered by motion-sensor cameras on the Haasts Bluff Aboriginal Land Trust, west of Alice Springs.

== Ecology ==
The central rock rat is a largely granivorous, having a preference for seeds from grasses of the genus Triodia. These grasses become abundant after long periods of no fires, explaining why populations of this species are steady even in areas that have no recently experienced fires. The diet of the central rock rat consists of four major food groups that can be found across all seasons. Seed makes up 72% of the species' food intake. The rest of its diet consists of plant leaves (21%), plant stems (3%), and insects (4%). They can be found near rocky habitats for burrow sites and local seed availability. This helps to explain why the central rock rat is found in such low numbers, since they rely on constant food supply and a steady and supportive habitat. This makes the central rock rat difficult to find in the Central Australian range. They play an essential role in seed dispersal as well as food resource for other animals in the wild. The species likely has a pattern of recovery and expansion during wet periods, probably due to increased food supply.

== Conservation ==
=== Threats ===
Habitat degradation is an obstacle to central rock rat conservation. Fires limit the available habitat, and the spread of buffelgrass kills off native grasses that the central rock rat feeds on and helps contribute to the spread of fire. They face predators such as dingos, and grazing from feral herbivores hurts their food supply. Despite all this, the species is believed to be making strides, which is supported by the sightings near the Haasts Bluff Aboriginal land trust west of Alice Springs, in Australia. The rat's predators can also give insight on how the species is recovering. The excrement of feral cats near the location site often includes the fur and bone skeletons of the central rock rat.

Until the 1996 capture, the central rock-rat had not been seen since 1960. Between 1970 and 1995, there were no recorded sightings of the species and it was declared that this species was indeed extinct. It was not until it was rediscovered in 1996 in the MacDonnell Ranges that this was proven to be incorrect. On 3 September 1996, members of the Conservation Volunteers Australia trapped an animal which was later identified from photographs as the central rock rat. Since that time sub-populations have been found at 15 other sites over a small area of the West MacDonnell Ranges. The full range of the current distribution of the species is unknown.

=== Legislation and plans ===
The central rock rat has a national recovery plan through the Australian Government, its overall objective being to stabilise the species and prevent population decreases. Specific objectives include: clarifying distribution, population size, and habitat; to create and employ management strategies of the sub-populations; maintaining captive populations; investigating the biology of captive individuals; and to increase awareness in the community. Recovery actions include establishing the sizes of sub-populations and monitoring changes in them, creating a fire strategy for known population locations, and capturing animals to add to the captive breeding program. The recovery plan also has a provision for habitat protection which would help other native species such as the common brushtail possum and the black-flanked rock-wallaby.

Beginning in 1996, after the re-discovery of the central rock rat, a captive breeding program was set up at Alice Springs Desert Park and at the Perth Zoo. After initially introducing 14 individuals from the wild, the first generation bred successfully but the subsequent one had significant trouble, eventually leading to the death of the last male in 2011.

The National Recovery Plan for the central rock rat in 2017 suggested to attempt another breeding program during a natural irruption phase of the wild population, for example after the heavy rainfall in the winter of 2016, so as to limit the effects on the wild numbers of the species. A limited number of central rock rats from Alice Springs Desert Park have been used for haematology study to promote easy health assessment tools for central rock rats.
