= Paragalaxias eleotroides =

Great Lake darter

Conservation status
- Endangered (IUCN 3.1)

Scientific classification
- Kingdom: Animalia
- Phylum: Chordata
- Class: Actinopterygii
- Division: Teleostei
- Order: Galaxiiformes
- Family: Galaxiidae
- Genus: Paragalaxias
- Species: P. eleotroides

Binomial name
- Paragalaxias eleotroides McDowall & Fulton, 1978
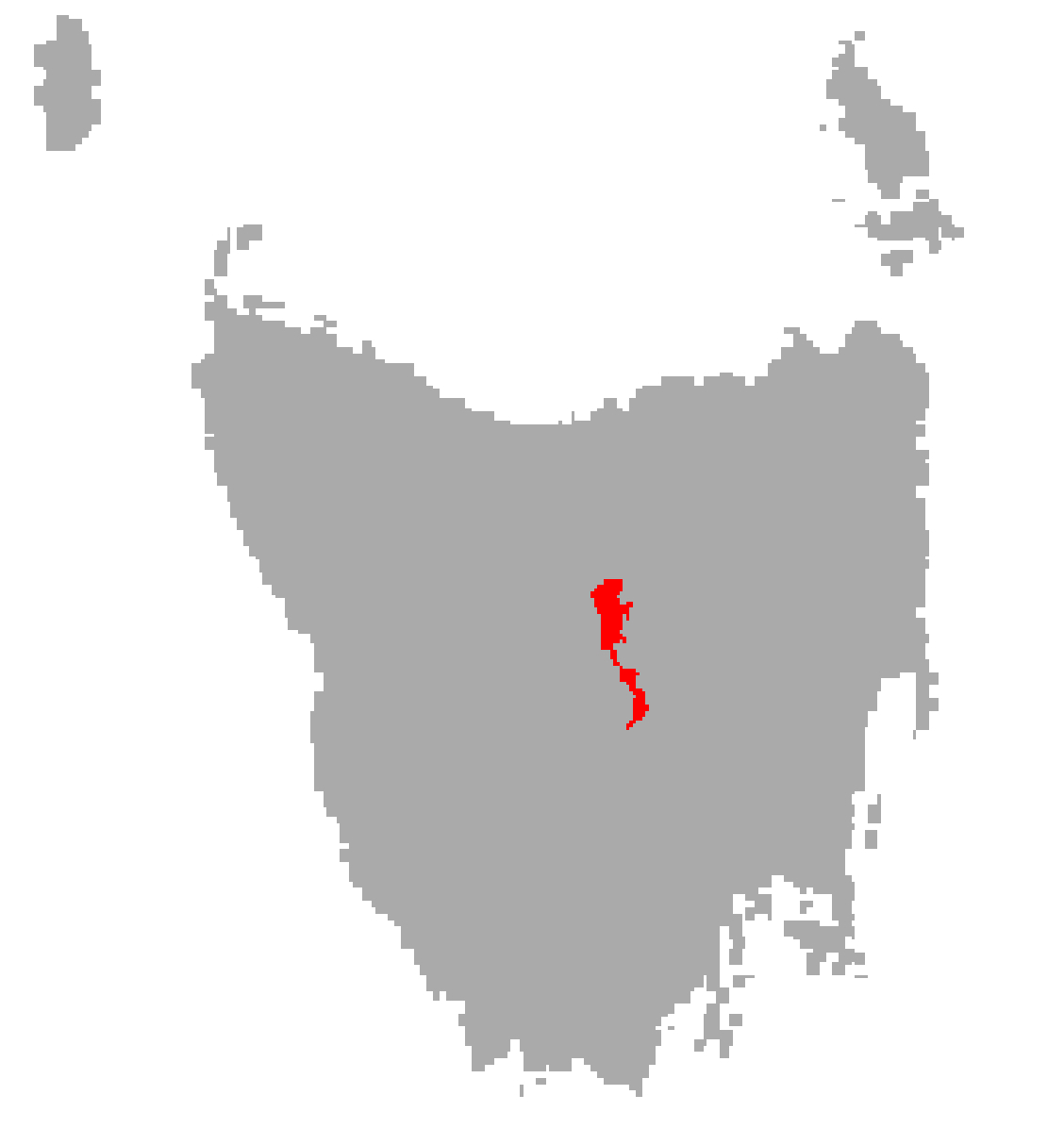

Species of ray-finned fish

Paragalaxias eleotroides, also known as the Great Lake darter and the Great Lake galaxias, is a species of freshwater ray-finned fish of the family Galaxiidae, endemic to Tasmania, Australia. The species lives in rocky shores in areas with aquatic vegetation.

The fish is only known to occur in the Central Highlands in Tasmania and has been designated as vulnerable.

It is one of the species considered in the 2006 Threatened Tasmanian Galaxiidae recovery programme.
