= Engaeus martigener =

Conservation status
- Endangered (IUCN 3.1)

Scientific classification
- Kingdom: Animalia
- Phylum: Arthropoda
- Class: Malacostraca
- Order: Decapoda
- Suborder: Pleocyemata
- Family: Parastacidae
- Genus: Engaeus
- Species: E. martigener

Binomial name
- Engaeus martigener Horwitz, 1990

Species of crayfish

Engaeus martigener, the Furneaux burrowing crayfish, is a species of crayfish in the family Parastacidae, endemic to Australia.
