= Gnaraloo worm-lizard =

Conservation status
- Endangered (IUCN 3.1)

Scientific classification
- Kingdom: Animalia
- Phylum: Chordata
- Class: Reptilia
- Order: Squamata
- Suborder: Gekkota
- Family: Pygopodidae
- Genus: Aprasia
- Species: A. litorea

Binomial name
- Aprasia litorea Maryan, Bush, & Adams, 2013

Species of lizard

The Gnaraloo worm-lizard (Aprasia litorea) is a species of legless lizard in the family Pygopodidae and order Gekkota. The Gnaraloo worm-lizard is a small, slim worm-lizard, with an average snout–vent length (distance from the tip of the snout to the end of the opening of the cloacal slit) of 84.8 cm (33.4 in) and a mean tail length of 60.7 cm (23.9 in). The upper side of the body is yellowish-brown, the sides are silvery-grey, and the underside of the body and head is heavily marked with dark brown flecks. The underside of the tail is light yellow; regenerated parts of the tail are greyish and marked with dark brown.

The species is endemic to Western Australia and has only been recorded from a 1–10 km (0.6–6 mi) wide strip of coastal sand dunes and sandplains west of Lake Macleod. Individuals have been collected from sand hillocks stabilized by vegetation, under leaf litter, and below rotting stumps and logs set in sand. In coastal habitats, the surrounding vegetation consists mainly of Spinifex longifolius, Nitraria schoberi, Scaevola crassifolia, and Acanthocarpus preissii, but vegetation further inland is denser and consists of wattles and hummock grasslands. The Gnaraloo worm-lizard is listed as being endangered on the IUCN Red List due to its extremely small range and is threatened by the modification of its habitat, caused by the growth of invasive weeds such as buffel grass and overgrazing and trampling by domestic sheep and goats.

== Taxonomy ==
Specimens of worm-lizards attributable to Aprasia litorea were first collected from the Lake Macleod region in 1980 by G. M. Storr and G. Harold; Storr and Harold identified these specimens as A. fusca (now itself recognised as A. rostrata), but the presence of 12 rows of midbody scales instead of 14 makes it likely that these specimens were Gnaraloo worm-lizards. A. litorea continued to be identified as A. fusca and A. sp. aff. fusca until its description in 2013. Aprasia litorea was described as a new species by the herpetologist Brad Maryan and his colleagues in 2013 based on an adult male specimen collected from Gnaraloo in 2000. The specific name is derived from the Latin adjective litoreus, 'of the seashore', and refers to the species' coastal range.

Aprasia is a genus of legless lizards in the family Pygopodidae, a group of nearly 50 species of geckoes with reduced limbs. Upon its description, A. litorea was thought to belong to the A. repens species-group, a clade of 8 species of Aprasia worm-lizards endemic to Western Australia. Further studies of allozyme data within the group have posited as being sister (most closely related) to A. haroldi. These two species are further sister to a clade formed by A. clairae and A. repens.

== Description ==
The Gnaraloo worm-lizard is a small, slim worm-lizard, with an average snout–vent length (distance from the tip of the snout to the end of the opening of the cloacal slit) of 84.8 cm (33.4 in), although it can be between 60 and 98 cm (24 and 39 in). It has a mean tail length of 60.7 cm (23.9 in). It has 162–170 ventral scales and 158–168 vertebral scales, with 12 rows of scales at the mid-body. There are five upper labial scales, with the first and fourth upper labial scales being fused to the nasal and postocular scales, respectively. The body scales are smooth, shiny, and arranged in parallel rows.

The narrow head is yellowish-brown with dark brown markings on the sides and on the upper side of the rostral and nasal scales. Some individuals can have strongly marked dark brown heads. The snout is long, narrow, and moderately angular when seen from the side, with a noticeably undershot lower jaw. The eyes are large and located above the third upper labial scale. The body and tail are very thin and round, the latter having a round tip when regenerated. The upper side of the body is yellowish-brown, more uniform in colour towards the front and blending to greyish towards the tail. Brownish streaks extend from behind the head, forming two indistinct lines of brownish streaks and slowly becoming more well-defined, eventually forming multiple lines on the tail. The sides are silvery-grey with dark brown streaks near the edges and middle and are not clearly differentiated from the outermost lines of brownish streaks. The underside of the body and head is heavily marked with dark brown flecks and is darker towards the vent. The underside of the tail is light yellow; regenerated parts of the tail are greyish and marked with dark brown. When preserved in alcohol, the yellowish-brown of the upperside turns cream and the dark markings on the body and tail become darker and more conspicuous.

The Gnaraloo worm-lizard is most similar in appearance to the Hermite Island worm-lizard, from which it differs in having a more slender build, 12 mid-body scale rows, a smaller adult snout–vent length, and lower average ventral and vertebral scale counts. Additionally, the lines formed by brownish streaks on the upper end of the sides are poorly distinguished from the greyish sides in the Gnaraloo worm-lizard, but the streaks and sides are clearly separated by a gap in the Hermite Island worm-lizard. The Gnaraloo worm-lizard is not likely to be confused with any other species of worm-lizards that occur in Western Australia: A. picturata and A. smithi have black heads, while A. inaurita, A. pulchella, and A. striolata having blunter, more rounded snouts and a free postocular scale that is not fused to the labial scales. It also shares some important characteristics with A. haroldi, A. clairae, and A. repens, but does not co-occur with any of them and can be told apart from them by a combination of its scalation, size, and coloration.

== Distribution and habitat ==
The species is endemic to Western Australia and has only been recorded from a 1–10 km (0.6–6 mi) wide strip of coastal sand dunes and sandplains west of Lake Macleod, from Gnaraloo south to Quobba Station. Surveys at the northern and southern limits of its known range are needed to understand whether it has a larger actual distribution. Individuals have been collected from sand hillocks stabilized by vegetation, under leaf litter, and below rotting stumps and logs set in sand. In coastal habitats, the surrounding vegetation consists mainly of Spinifex longifolius, Nitraria schoberi, Scaevola crassifolia, and Acanthocarpus preissii, but vegetation further inland is denser and consists of wattles such as Acacia coriacea and Triodia hummock grasslands.

== Conservation ==
The Gnaraloo worm-lizard is listed as being endangered by the International Union for Conservation of Nature on the IUCN Red List due to its extremely small range of around 300 km^{2} (120 sq mi), of which it inhabits only a small part. The species is threatened by the modification of its habitat, caused by the growth of invasive weeds such as buffel grass and overgrazing and trampling by domestic sheep and goats. The entire known range of this species is managed for grazing and has no protected areas.
