= Mallee worm-lizard =

There are two species of lizard named mallee worm-lizard:

- Aprasia aurita
- Aprasia inaurita
