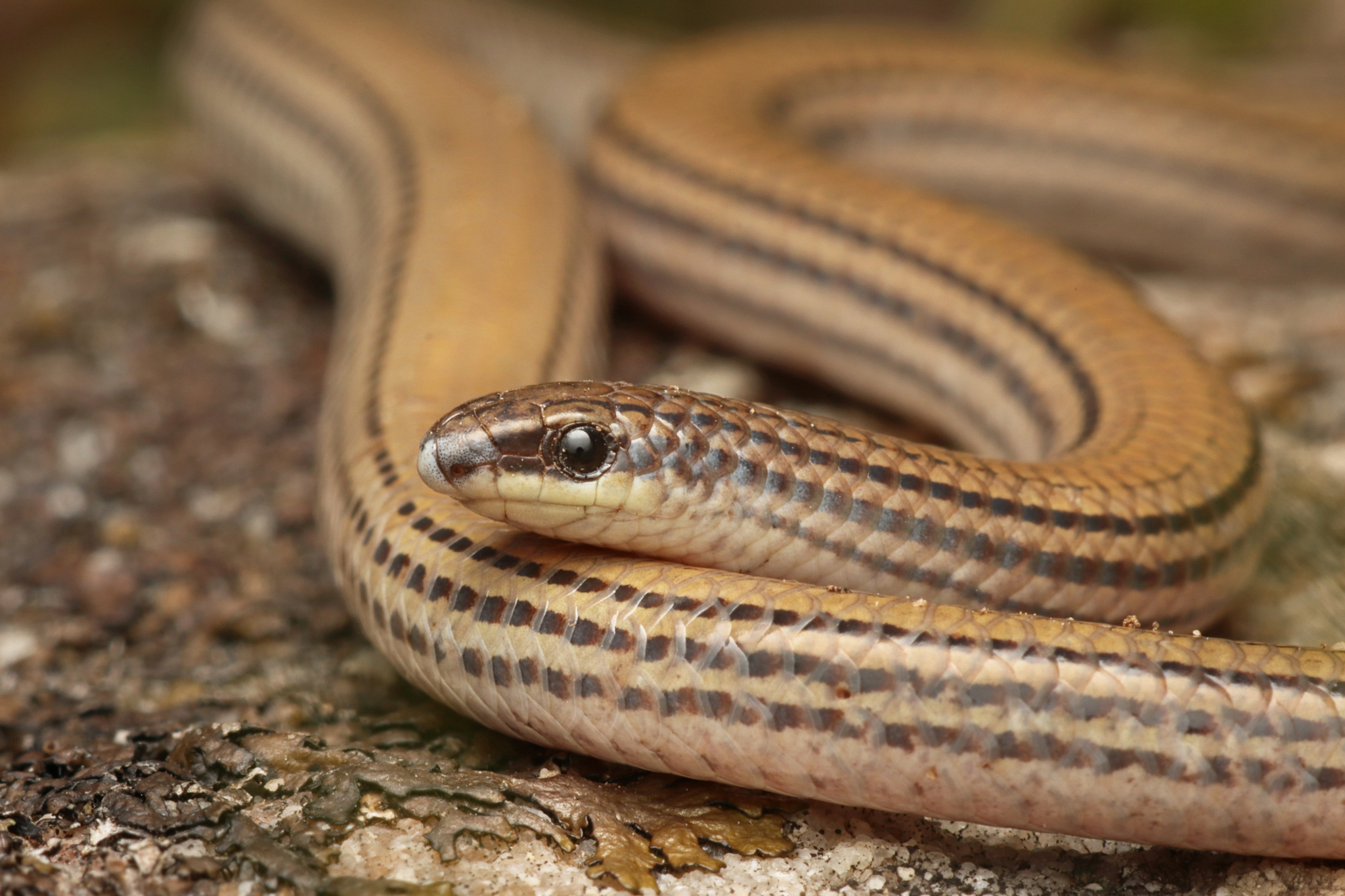

Conservation status
- Least Concern (IUCN 3.1)

Scientific classification
- Kingdom: Animalia
- Phylum: Chordata
- Class: Reptilia
- Order: Squamata
- Suborder: Gekkota
- Family: Pygopodidae
- Genus: Aprasia
- Species: A. striolata

Binomial name
- Aprasia striolata Lütken, 1863

= Striated worm-lizard =

Species of lizard

The striated worm-lizard (Aprasia striolata) is a species of legless lizard in the family Pygopodidae. It is endemic to southern Australia (southern Western Australia, South Australia, and western Victoria). Commonly known as Striated worm-lizard but has also been referred to as the Striped or Lined worm-lizard due to its pattern of long, thin parallel streaks. Some populations such as those in WA and Kangaroo Island may have absent stripes or the lines present as lines of dots.

In 1994, Webb and Shine dissected 615 preserved pygopodid museum specimens to study their life-history. Most of this information is collected from that study where they noted that there were fewer females than males in the museum collections.

== Description ==
The Pygopodidae family of legless lizards is characterised by extreme body elongation and reduced limbs or complete lack of limbs which makes them appear snake-like. The Aprasia genus is morphologically diverse but comprises the small worm-like burrowers. Several of their morphological and trophic features make them similar to sympatric Typholopidae (blind snakes).

== Taxonomy ==
In 1863 a specimen collected by Möller was presented to Danish zoologist and naturalist, Christian Frederik Lütken which is when Lütken described the Apriasia striolata.

Common names include: Striated worm-lizard, Striped worm-lizard and Lined worm-lizard.

== Features ==
- Elongate, slender, cylindrical body.
- Pale brown, olive-brown or grey – usually with narrow dark stripes on top of the head which fade out at the neck. Thin dark stripes run dorso-laterally along the body and tail with the most noticeable stripe extending from the snout and passing through the eye. (Note: In some populations in WA and Kangaroo Island, the stripes can be absent or are present as lines of dots).
- Whitish coloured underneath.
- Very short tail (shorter than body).
- Scales at 12 rows at mid-body (including ventrals).
- Rounded and relatively blunt snout.
- Nostril is first supralabial anterior to the nostril.
- Single posocular scale between the fourth supralabial and supraocular.
- Usually has 3 enlarged pre-anal scales.
- Relatively large eyes.
- Females grow larger than males their mean snout-vent length significantly larger than males (based on museum collections where more male specimens were collected).
- Dentition greatly reduced.
- The premaxilla is toothed in adult males but lacking in juveniles and females (vestigial teeth may be present in females).
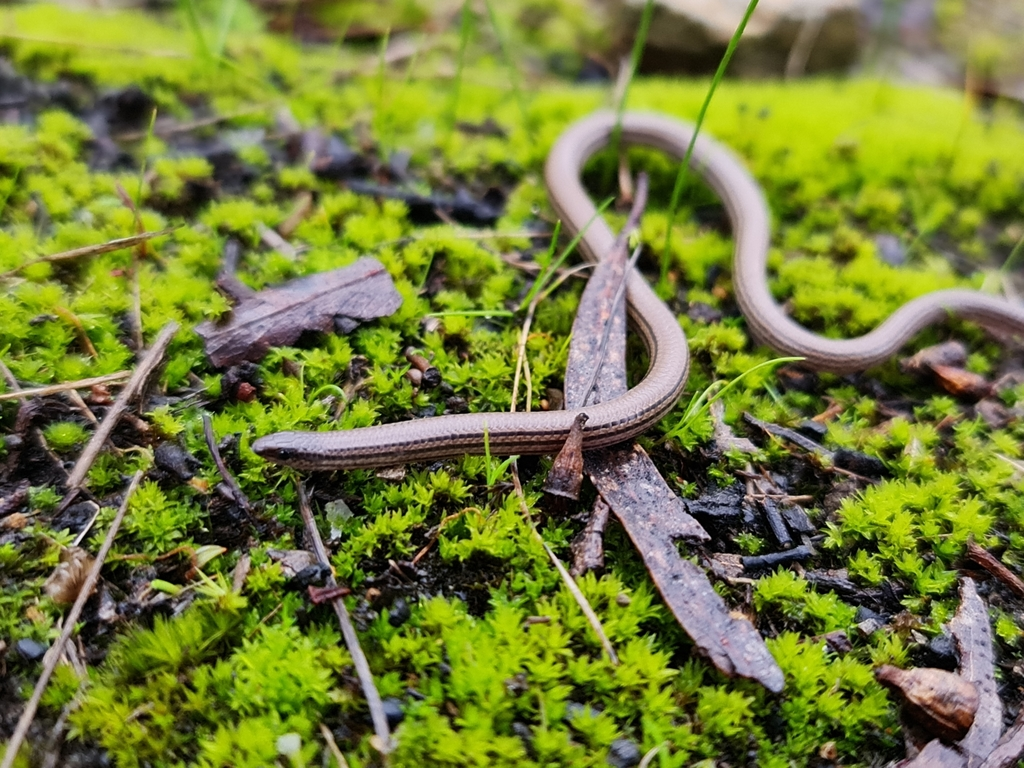
  Aprasia striolata - Striated worm-lizard

== Distribution ==
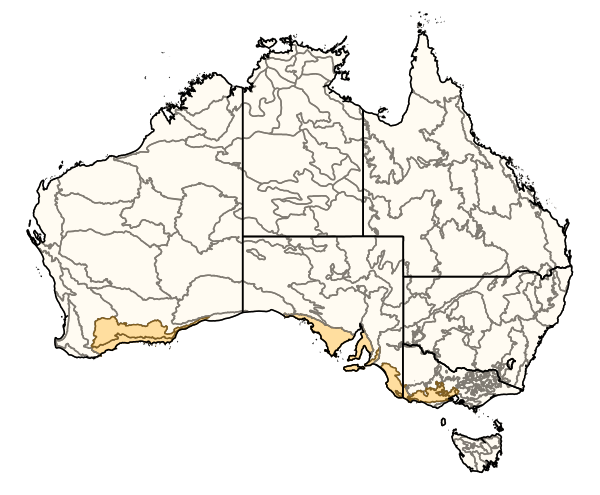
Map showing the distribution of the Striated worm-lizard (Aprasia striolata).

Two isolated populations appear to exist: one is the south-west of Western Australia and the other extending from western Victoria to the Eyre Peninsula in South Australia.

== Habitat ==
Found burrowing in a wide variety of habitats that have mostly dry sandy or loamy soils.

== Diet ==
Both males and females feed on ant brood from a variety of ant genera.

Almost entirely (>95%) larvae and pupae of ants. In male Aprasia striolata up to 5% of their digestive tracts contained adult ants.

Prey is swallowed whole, showing no evidence of being chewed prior to ingestion. Dentition is reduced in the species.

Rarely they may consume other insect pupa. In the Webb and Shine study they found one mature male had consumed a small insect pupa along with 19 ant pupae.

== Behaviour ==
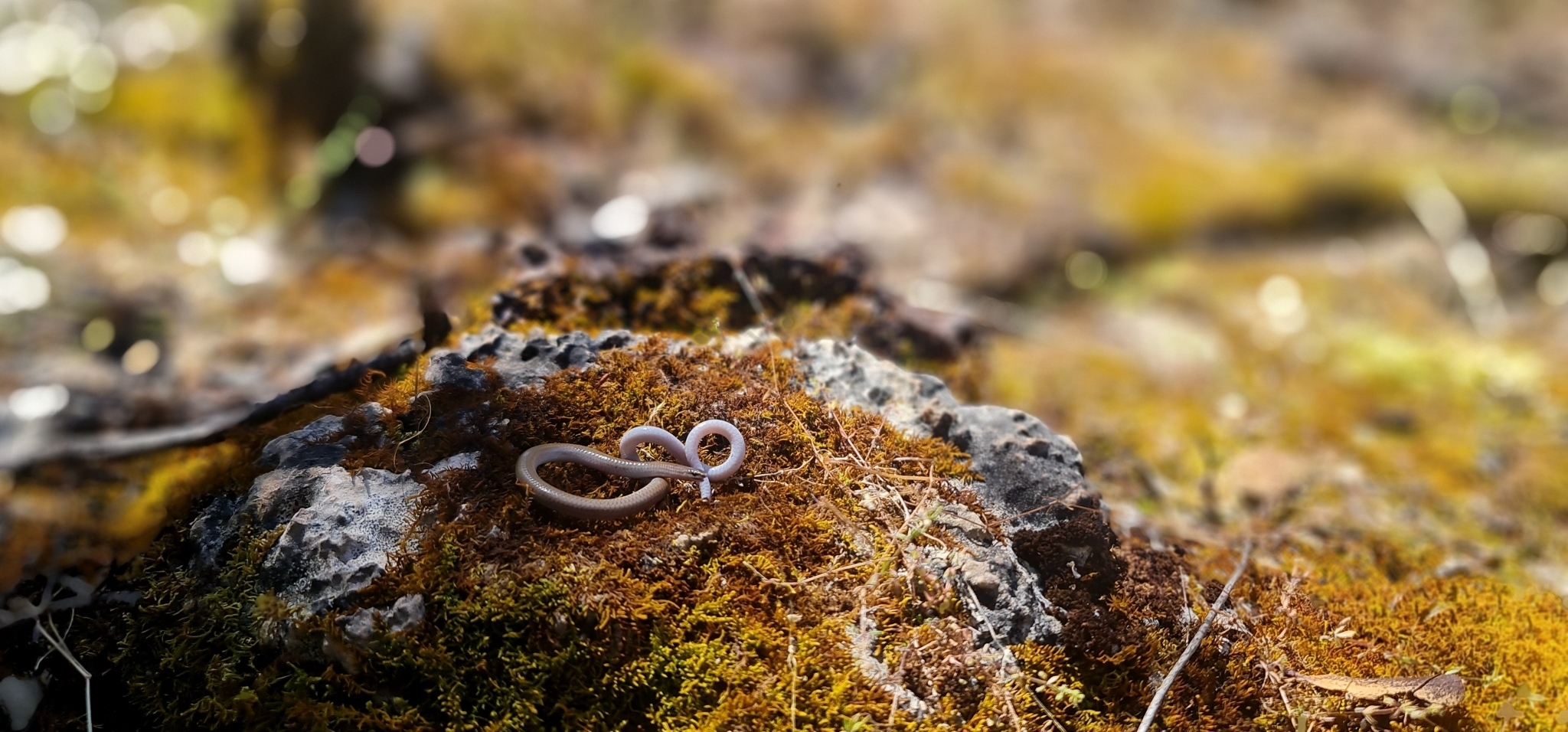
Striated worm-lizard (Aprasia striolata)

Aprasia feed infrequently and only in the warmer months, but they consume a large amount "binge feeding" prey in a single meal.

It is not known how Aprasia locate ant colonies as their sensory capabilities have not yet been studied. It is also unknown how they defend or cope with the defences of adult ants that are not likely to simply standby and watch while their brood is consumed.

== Reproduction ==
Both males and females appear to be able to reproduce throughout the year with gravid females and males with enlarged testes collected year-round. All other Squamate species in this relatively cool-climate southern Australian area tend to have strong seasonally based reproductive cycles. This suggests that females are likely able to produce more than one clutch per year. Records of males having enlarged testes for most of the year could indicate that mating occurs year-round or that the testes become enlarged in autumn and winter prior to mating in spring.

Oviparous – producing thick-shelled elongate eggs.

The dentition characteristics of Aprasia where premaxilla are present in males but lacking in juveniles and females have generally been interpreted by evolutionary biologists as either a result of sexual selection (enhancing ability to win physical combat against other males, or to hold females during copulation) or as a dietary mechanism where males consume different or larger prey than females. Due to the lack of evidence of dietary difference between males and females of Aprasia striolata it is suggested that sexual selection is the reason for the difference in dentition between males and females.

== Threats/Predators ==
Much of the habitat, especially since European colonisation has been cleared for farming and tree plantations.

In February 2017, the International Union for Conservation of Nature and Natural Resources (IUCN) red list assessment classified the Aprasia striolata to the 'Least Concern' Red List category. The justification for this is that it, "has a wide distribution and there are no major threats and it is not currently in decline".

Although the species was listed as 'Near threatened' in the Advisory List of Threatened Vertebrate Fauna in Victoria 2013.
