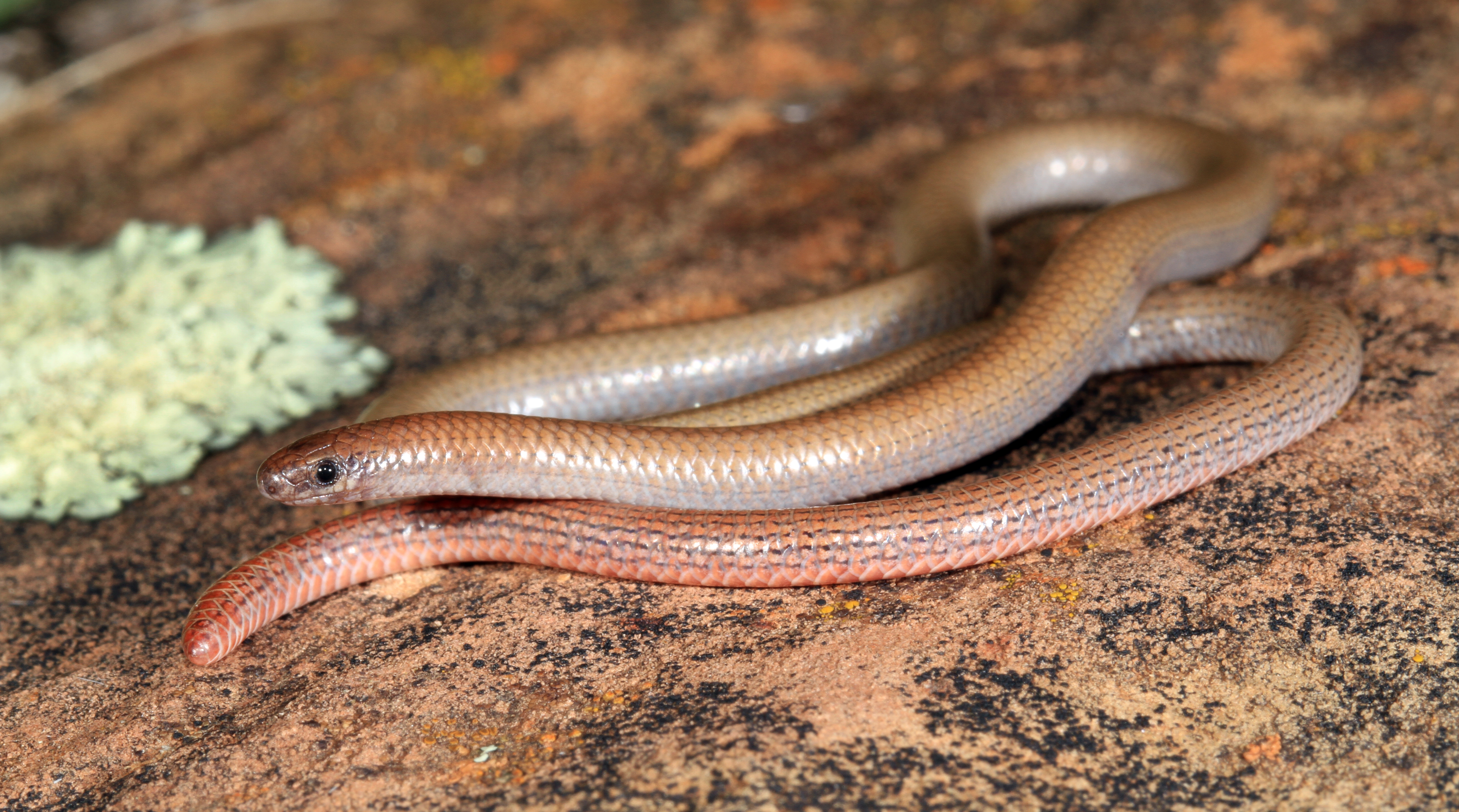

Conservation status
- Least Concern (IUCN 3.1)

- Vulnerable (EPBC Act)

Scientific classification
- Kingdom: Animalia
- Phylum: Chordata
- Class: Reptilia
- Order: Squamata
- Suborder: Gekkota
- Family: Pygopodidae
- Genus: Aprasia
- Species: A. pseudopulchella

Binomial name
- Aprasia pseudopulchella Kluge, 1974

= Flinders Ranges worm-lizard =

Species of lizard

The Flinders Ranges worm-lizard (Aprasia pseudopulchella) is a species of lizard in the Pygopodidae family endemic to the state of South Australia. The name derives from the Flinders Ranges.

== Etymology ==
The name derives from the Greek pseudo, meaning "false", prefixing the name of another species, Aprasia pulchella. Described by A. G. Kluge, the lizard has a more distant evolutionary relationship relative to that of Aprasia parapulchella.

== Distribution ==
The Flinders Ranges worm-lizard is found in both the North and South Flinders Ranges, with no differences between the samples found in each location in 1974.

== Description ==
The lizard is legless. There is no difference between the males and females of the species.

== Conservation status ==
Since 16 July 2000 and as of August 2023, the Flinders Ranges worm-lizard is listed as Vulnerable under the federal Environment Protection and Biodiversity Conservation Act 1999 (EPBC Act). A study published in Biological Conservation in March 2023 listed 23 species which the authors considered to no longer meet the criteria as threatened species under the EPBC Act, including the Flinders Ranges worm-lizard. The reason for the assessment was "Populations now stable".
