= Painted dragon =

Painted dragon may refer to:

- Ctenophorus pictus, a species of agamid lizard found in the drier areas of southern and central Australia
- Laudakia stellio, a species of agamid lizard found in Greece, southwest Asia, and northeast Africa
