= Lizard communication =

Sending or receiving of information as conducted by lizards

Lizards are among the most diverse groups of reptiles, with more than 5,600 species. With such diversity in physical and behavioral traits, lizards have evolved many ways to communicate. Communication may be physical, chemical, tactile, or vocal, and varies according to habitat, sexual selection practices, and predator avoidance methods. Each type of communication uses different sensory systems, including visual, olfactory, and auditory.

== Scenarios for lizard communication ==
Lizards communicate with members of their own species to find appropriate mates and when competing for resources such as food or habitat. Intraspecific communication is instrumental in sexual selection, as phenotypic variation within a population can result in some individuals mating more than others.

Lizard species use interspecific communication in competition for resources and during predator-prey interactions. Anolis cristatellus, for example, uses "pushup displays" as a pursuit-deterrent signal to predators, communicating that the anole is healthy and would likely be able to escape if pursued. This encourages the predator to go after other prey (potentially anoles of the same species in worse condition). Lizards in better condition perform this behavior more frequently, making it a form of honest signaling.

== Methods of communication ==
Lizards have evolved several modes of communication, including visual, chemical, tactile, and vocal. Chemical and visual communication are widespread, with visual communication being the most well-studied, while tactile and vocal communication have traditionally been thought to occur in just a handful of lizard species; however, modern scientific techniques have allowed for greater study of non-visual modes of communication, and they may be more widespread than previously thought.

=== Visual communication ===
An anole lizard in Costa Rica repeatedly protracting and retracting its dewlap.

Lizards that use visual communication gather information by observing other lizards' physical and behavioral characteristics, somewhat like humans communicating using body language. Lizards that use visual communication often have highly developed visual systems—most can see colors, and some can see UV light.

Lizards can have vibrant colors and patterns and flashy behaviors intended to communicate both inter- and intraspecifically. Vibrant colors and patterns can draw attention from predators or competition, so they may be located on a dewlap or an area of the body that is usually hidden, like the belly. Many Anolis species have dewlaps that they can extend and retract at will, such as when attracting mates or dueling with competitors. The dewlaps are often colorful but are well hidden when retracted. Some Sceloporus lizards develop vibrant blue and black coloration on their bellies during breeding season. This color is not visible to other lizards unless the lizard flattens its body to expose the colorful parts of its belly, a behavior called dorsal ventral flattening.

Visual communication is common among species that live at relatively high population densities and often come into close contact. Visual communication is well suited for use in many different habitats and can be modified by lizards to accommodate changing habitat conditions, so long as individuals come into contact frequently enough.

Lizards may also display "push-up" behaviors as a visual display of endurance to attract potential mates, scare off predators, and display their claim to territory. Such displays, in males, can communicate to females that they possess endurance which may increase their chances of mating. They also serve as "challenge" displays, in which a lizard will do push-ups in response to invaders in their territory. This may be done to avoid the possibility of an actual fight. Lizards may display push-ups without a direct audience. Push-ups may be done for non-communication purposes, such as regulating body temperature. This behavior is common in the genus Sceloporus (spiny lizards).

=== Chemical communication ===
Some lizards deposit chemicals such as pheromones into the environment, where the chemicals can elicit changes in the behavior and sometimes physiology of other individuals. The composition of these chemicals often differs considerably between species, allowing lizards to tell whether the lizard that deposited the chemical was a member of the same or a different species. Chemical secretions in some species (such as Iberian rock-lizards, Lacerta monticola) also vary by individual, so individuals can tell whether the lizard that produced a chemical is familiar or not.

Lizards that use chemical communication have highly developed olfactory systems to detect chemicals in the environment, and often have femoral glands or pores on their back legs to release chemicals. Such lizards sometimes drag their back legs or the lower half of their body against a surface to spread their chemical secretions. Tongue flicking is used to "taste" chemicals in the air and on various surfaces, such as rocks or logs that another lizard might have been sitting on. Chemicals can also be deposited through feces—lizards have been observed defecating systematically throughout the area they live in, possibly chemically marking the boundaries of their territory.

Lizards do not need to come into direct contact to communicate chemically. Once a chemical has been released onto a surface, it stays until washed away or otherwise removed, and lizards may come into contact with it hours or days later. Thus, chemical communication is useful among lizards that live at relatively low population densities or do not come into close contact, and it is usually better suited to dry environments, as water can wash chemicals away.

Recent advances have dramatically increased our understanding of lizard chemical communication. Further analysis of the composition of these chemicals will yield more information about the individuals that produce them and how they communicate in different contexts.

==== In Podarcis hispanicus ====
The chemicals secreted by Podarcis hispanicus are generally more volatile and chemically stable than those of similar species. Chemosensory recognition is greater in males, as it allows them to identify specific females during breeding season and to recognize known neighbors and thus not perform anti-predator behaviors. It is also used in intra-sexual aggression. Male lizards release chemical stimuli from their femoral glands.

=== Tactile communication ===
Some lizards use direct or indirect touch as a form of communication. Direct contact can occur in courtship, such as through nudging or licking, and in aggressive behavior—for many lizards, a fight may escalate to biting or bumping into one another. Species that engage in physical conflict often only resort to direct contact when other methods of deterring potential rivals have failed. In the case of courtship, some lizards, such as the male Komodo dragon (Varanus komodoensis), lick females to determine whether they are sexually receptive. While this is direct touch, the male is also detecting chemicals in the female's body.

Some forms of tactile communication, such as vibrational, do not involve direct touch. Some chameleon species communicate with one another by vibrating the substrate they are standing on, such as a tree branch or leaf. Unique adaptations in ear and jaw morphology enable such lizards to detect these vibrations. Lizards that live on easily moved substrates such as thin tree branches or leaves are more likely to use vibrational communication than lizards that live on substrates that do not transmit vibrations as easily, such as the ground or thick tree trunks.

=== Vocal communication ===
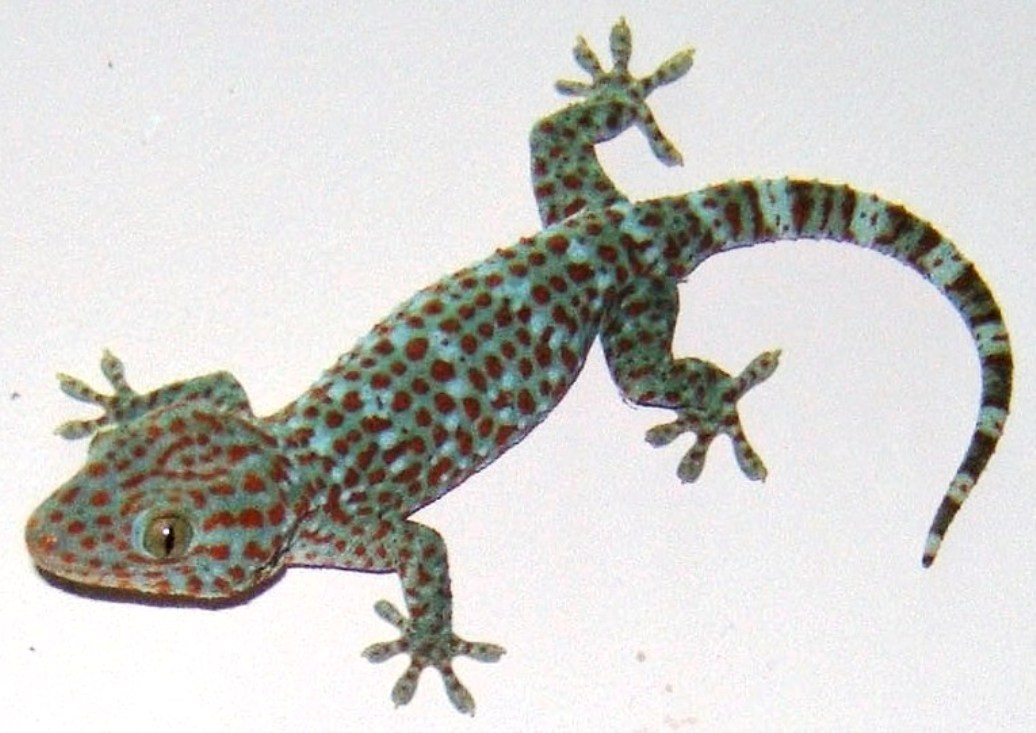
Tokay gecko is known for its vocalizations

This mode of communication is primarily limited to nocturnal geckos, many of which produce vocalizations during behavioral interactions such as male competition or predator avoidance. Another lizard, Liolaemus chiliensis, emits distress calls. Other lizards can produce vocalizations—for instance, when handled—but most have not been observed to do so in the wild.

Lizards that use vocal communication need to produce vocalizations and need an appropriate auditory system to process the sounds. Vocal communication is well suited for nocturnal lizards or those that live in low-visibility habitats because it does not require coming into contact with or seeing other lizards.
