= Zuytdorp worm-lizard =

Conservation status
- Least Concern (IUCN 3.1)

Scientific classification
- Kingdom: Animalia
- Phylum: Chordata
- Class: Reptilia
- Order: Squamata
- Suborder: Gekkota
- Family: Pygopodidae
- Genus: Aprasia
- Species: A. smithi

Binomial name
- Aprasia smithi Storr, 1970

Synonyms
- Aprasia smithi Storr, 1970; Abilaena smithi — Wells, 2007; Aprasia smithi — Wilson & Swan, 2010

Species of lizard

The Zuytdorp worm-lizard (Aprasia smithi), also known commonly as Smith's legless lizard, is a species of lizard in the family Pygopodidae. The species is endemic to Australia.

== Etymology ==
The specific name, smithi, is in honor of Australian herpetologist Lawrence Alec Smith (born 1944).

== Geographic range ==
A. smithi is found in the Australian state of Western Australia

== Habitat ==
The preferred natural habitats of A. smithi are grassland, and shrubland.

== Reproduction ==
A smithi is oviparous.
