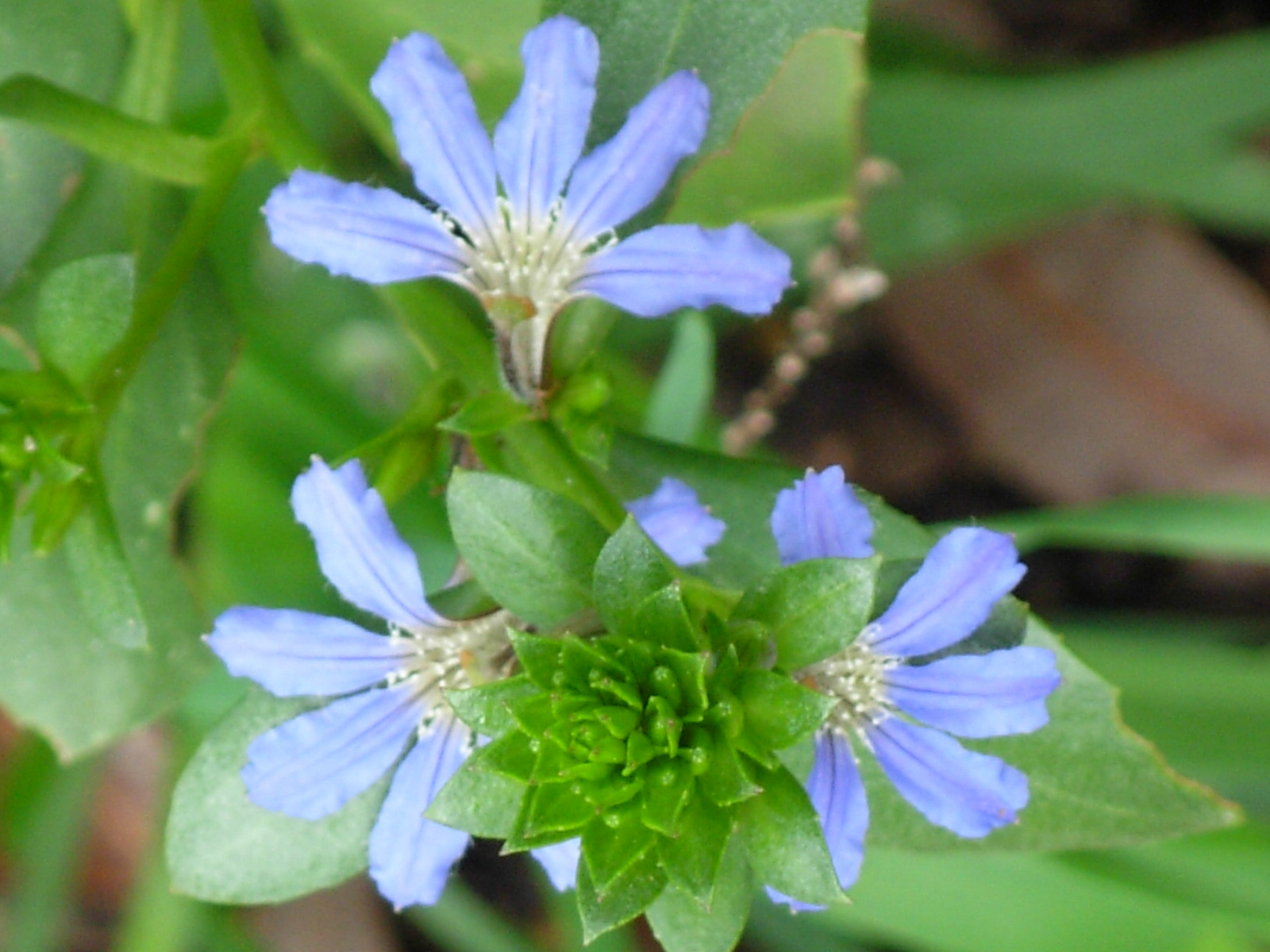

Scientific classification
- Kingdom: Plantae
- Clade: Embryophytes
- Clade: Tracheophytes
- Clade: Spermatophytes
- Clade: Angiosperms
- Clade: Eudicots
- Clade: Asterids
- Order: Asterales
- Family: Goodeniaceae
- Genus: Scaevola
- Species: S. crassifolia

Binomial name
- Scaevola crassifolia Labill.
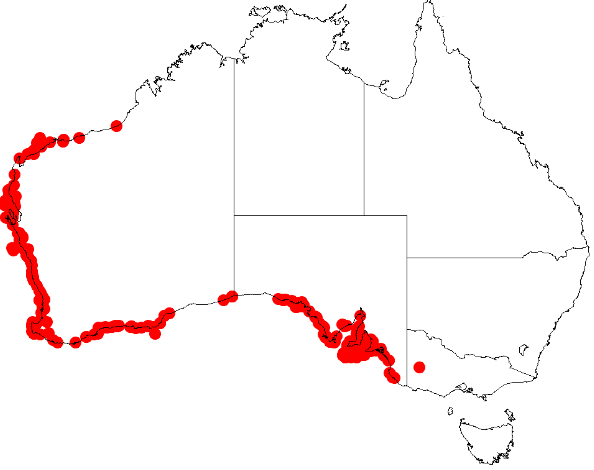
- Occurrence data from Australasian Virtual Herbarium

Synonyms
- Lobelia crassifolia (Labill.) Kuntze; Merkusia crassifolia (Labill.) de Vriese

= Scaevola crassifolia =

Species of plant

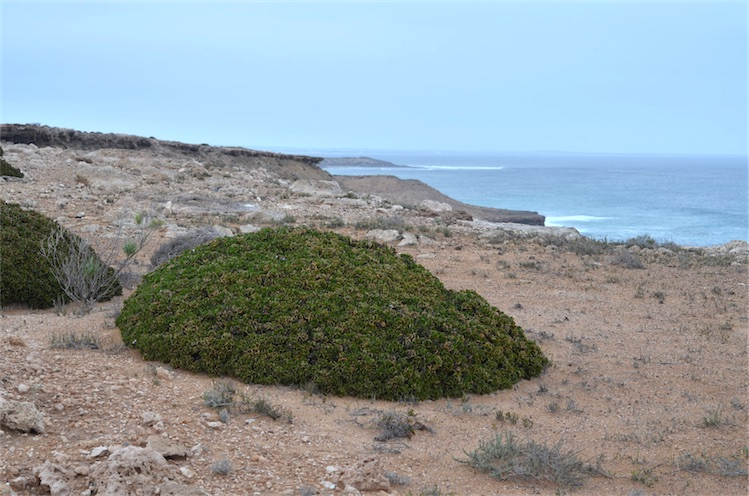
Habit at Venus Bay

Scaevola crassifolia, commonly known as thick-leaved fan-flower, or cushion fanflower, is a species of flowering plant in the family Goodeniaceae, and is native to coastal areas of Western Australia and South Australia. It is an erect, low-lying or spreading shrub with egg-shaped to round, mostly toothed leaves, spikes of white, blue or pale purple flowers and spherical fruit.

== Description ==
Scaevola crassifolia is an erect, low-lying or spreading shrub that typically grows up to 1.5 m (4 ft 11 in) high and 3 m (9.8 ft) wide, apparently glabrous and sticky when young. Its leaves are egg-shaped to round, mostly toothed, 18–80 mm (0.71–3.15 in) long and 3–43 mm (0.12–1.69 in) wide. The flowers are borne in spikes 55 mm (2.2 in) long with leafy bracts at the base, on the ends of branches, the bracteoles linear to triangular and up to 4 m (13 ft) long. The sepals are fused, forming a tube 0.3–1 mm (0.012–0.039 in) long and the petals are white, blue or pale purple, 8–11 mm (0.31–0.43 in) long, glabrous or with short hairs on the outside, bearded inside with wings 0.5–1 mm (0.020–0.039 in) long. Flowering occurs from August to January, and the fruit is spherical, up to 5 mm (0.20 in) long and rough with three to five swollen ribs and usually glabrous.

Scaevola nitida is closely similar to S. crassifolia but is a larger shrub with thinner leaves.

== Taxonomy ==
Scaevola crassifolia was first formally described in 1805 by Jacques Labillardière in his Novae Hollandiae Plantarum Specimen. The specific epithet (crassifolia) means 'thick-leaved'.

== Distribution and habitat ==
Thick-leaved fan-flower grows in sand on coastal dunes, plains and limestone cliffs from near Carnarvon in Western Australia to near Robe in South Australia.
