= Aprasia picturata =

Conservation status
- Data Deficient (IUCN 3.1)

Scientific classification
- Kingdom: Animalia
- Phylum: Chordata
- Class: Reptilia
- Order: Squamata
- Suborder: Gekkota
- Family: Pygopodidae
- Genus: Aprasia
- Species: A. picturata

Binomial name
- Aprasia picturata Smith & Henry, 1999

Species of lizard

Aprasia picturata is a species of lizard in the family Pygopodidae. It is endemic to Australia.
