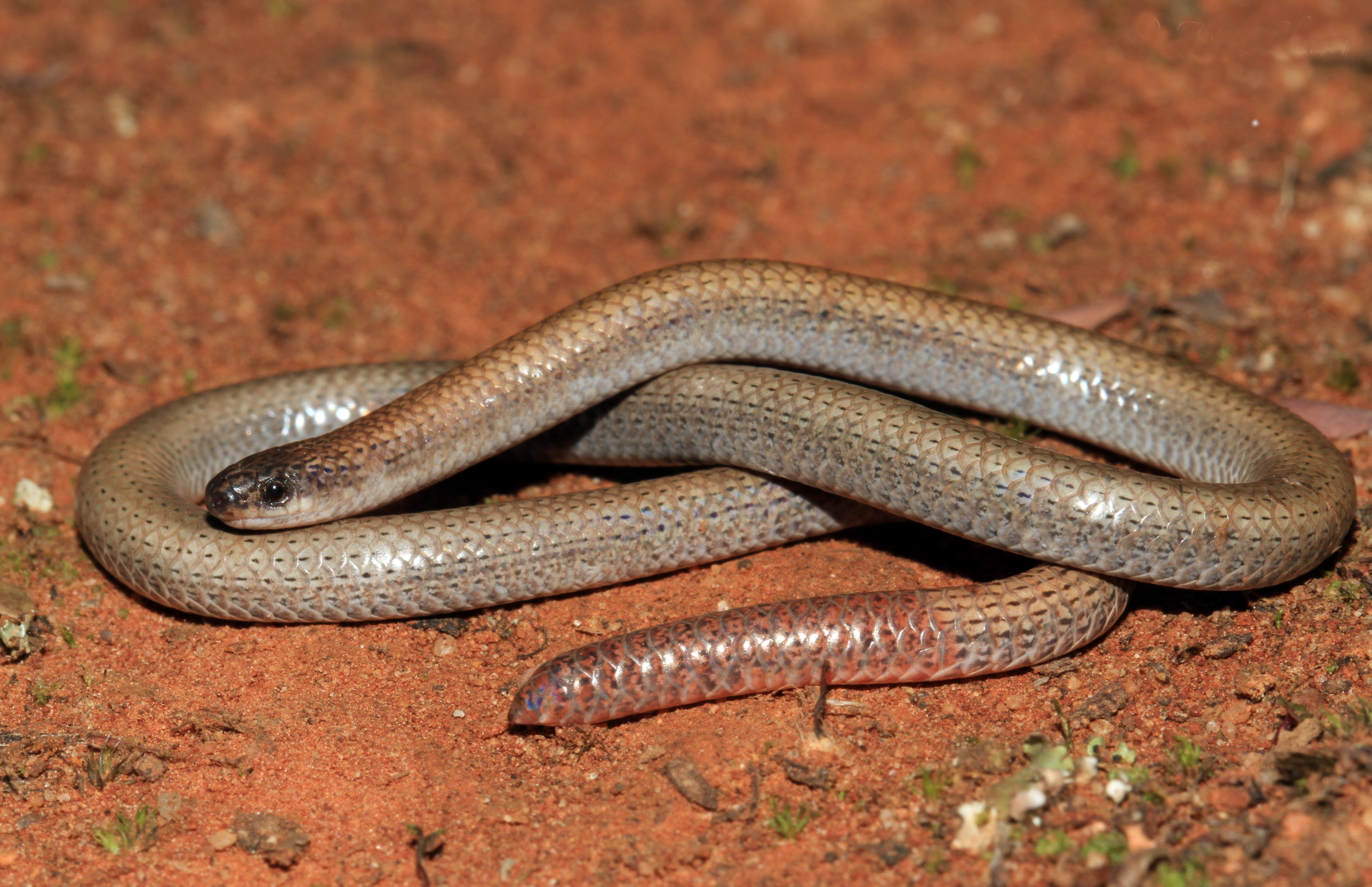
- Pink-tailed worm-lizard (Aprasia parapulchella)

Scientific classification
- Kingdom: Animalia
- Phylum: Chordata
- Class: Reptilia
- Order: Squamata
- Suborder: Gekkota
- Family: Pygopodidae
- Genus: Aprasia; Gray, 1839

= Aprasia =

Genus of lizards

Aprasia is a genus of lizards in the family Pygopodidae. The genus is endemic to Australia. The species in the genus Aprasia are worm-like, burrowing lizards. At least four of the species are oviparous.

== Species ==
The genus Aprasia contains the following species:

- Aprasia aurita Kluge, 1974 – eared worm-lizard, mallee worm-lizard
- Aprasia clairae Maryan, How & Adams, 2013
- Aprasia haroldi Storr, 1978 – Shark Bay worm-lizard
- Aprasia inaurita Kluge, 1974 – mallee worm-lizard, red-tailed worm-lizard
- Aprasia litorea Maryan, Bush & Adams, 2013 – Gnaraloo worm-lizard
- Aprasia parapulchella Kluge, 1974 – granite worm-lizard, pink-tailed worm-lizard
- Aprasia picturata L.A. Smith & Henry, 1999
- Aprasia pseudopulchella Kluge, 1974 – Flinders Ranges worm-lizard
- Aprasia pulchella Gray, 1839 – pretty worm-lizard
- Aprasia repens (Fry, 1914) – sedgelands worm-lizard
- Aprasia rostrata Parker, 1956 – Exmouth worm-lizard, Hermite Island worm-lizard
- Aprasia smithi Storr, 1970 – Zuytdorp worm-lizard
- Aprasia striolata Lütken, 1863 – striated worm-lizard
- Aprasia wicherina Maryan, Adams & Aplin, 2015 – Wicherina worm-lizard

Nota bene: A binomial authority in parentheses indicates that the species was originally described in a genus other than Aprasia.
