= Lütken =

Lütken or Lutken is a surname. Notable people with the surname include:

- Anne Marie Lütken (1916–2001), Danish painter
- Augusta Lütken (1855–1910), Danish operatic soprano
- Christian Frederik Lütken (1827–1901), Danish naturalist
- David M. Lutken (born 1957), American musician, actor, playwright and director
- Frances Lütken (born 1950), British cross-country skier
- Hans T. H. Lütken (1882–?), Norwegian jurist and state auditor
- Hulda Lütken (1896–1946), Danish poet and novelist
- Julie Lütken (1788–1816), Danish painter
- Per Lütken (1916–1998), Danish glassmaker
- Sigrid Lütken (1915–2008), Danish sculptor
