= Shark Bay worm-lizard =

Conservation status
- Least Concern (IUCN 3.1)

Scientific classification
- Kingdom: Animalia
- Phylum: Chordata
- Class: Reptilia
- Order: Squamata
- Suborder: Gekkota
- Family: Pygopodidae
- Genus: Aprasia
- Species: A. haroldi

Binomial name
- Aprasia haroldi Storr, 1978

Species of lizard

The Shark Bay worm-lizard (Aprasia haroldi), also known commonly as Harold's legless skink, is a species of lizard in the family Pygopodidae. The species is endemic to the Shark Bay region in Western Australia, Australia. It is a limbless lizard found burrowing in loose soil in arid areas.

== Etymology ==
The specific name, haroldi, is in honor of Australian herpetologist Gregory Harold.

== Habitat ==
The preferred natural habitats of A. haroldi are coastal sand dunes and sandy desert.

== Description ==
A small limbless lizard, A. haroldi has an average snout-to-vent length (SVL) of 8.6 cm (3.4 in), and an average tail length of 6.1 cm (2.4 in). It has only four upper labials. The prefrontal is in broad contact with the first upper labial and in narrow contact with the second upper labial. The second upper labial is in contact with the eye. There are 14 scale rows around the body at midbody. Both dorsally and ventrally, A. haroldi is pale brownish grey with darker markings, except for the lips and chin which are yellowish white, and the underside of the tail which is creamy white.

== Reproduction ==
A. haroldi is oviparous.
