= Pretty worm-lizard =

Conservation status
- Least Concern (IUCN 3.1)

Scientific classification
- Kingdom: Animalia
- Phylum: Chordata
- Class: Reptilia
- Order: Squamata
- Suborder: Gekkota
- Family: Pygopodidae
- Genus: Aprasia
- Species: A. pulchella

Binomial name
- Aprasia pulchella Gray, 1839

Species of lizard

The pretty worm-lizard (Aprasia pulchella) is a species of lizard in the Pygopodidae family endemic to Australia.
