= Aprasia clairae =

Conservation status
- Data Deficient (IUCN 3.1)

Scientific classification
- Kingdom: Animalia
- Phylum: Chordata
- Class: Reptilia
- Order: Squamata
- Suborder: Gekkota
- Family: Pygopodidae
- Genus: Aprasia
- Species: A. clairae

Binomial name
- Aprasia clairae Maryan, How, & Adams, 2013

Species of lizard

Aprasia clairae is a species of lizard in the Pygopodidae family endemic to Australia.
