= Augusta Lütken =

Danish operatic soprano

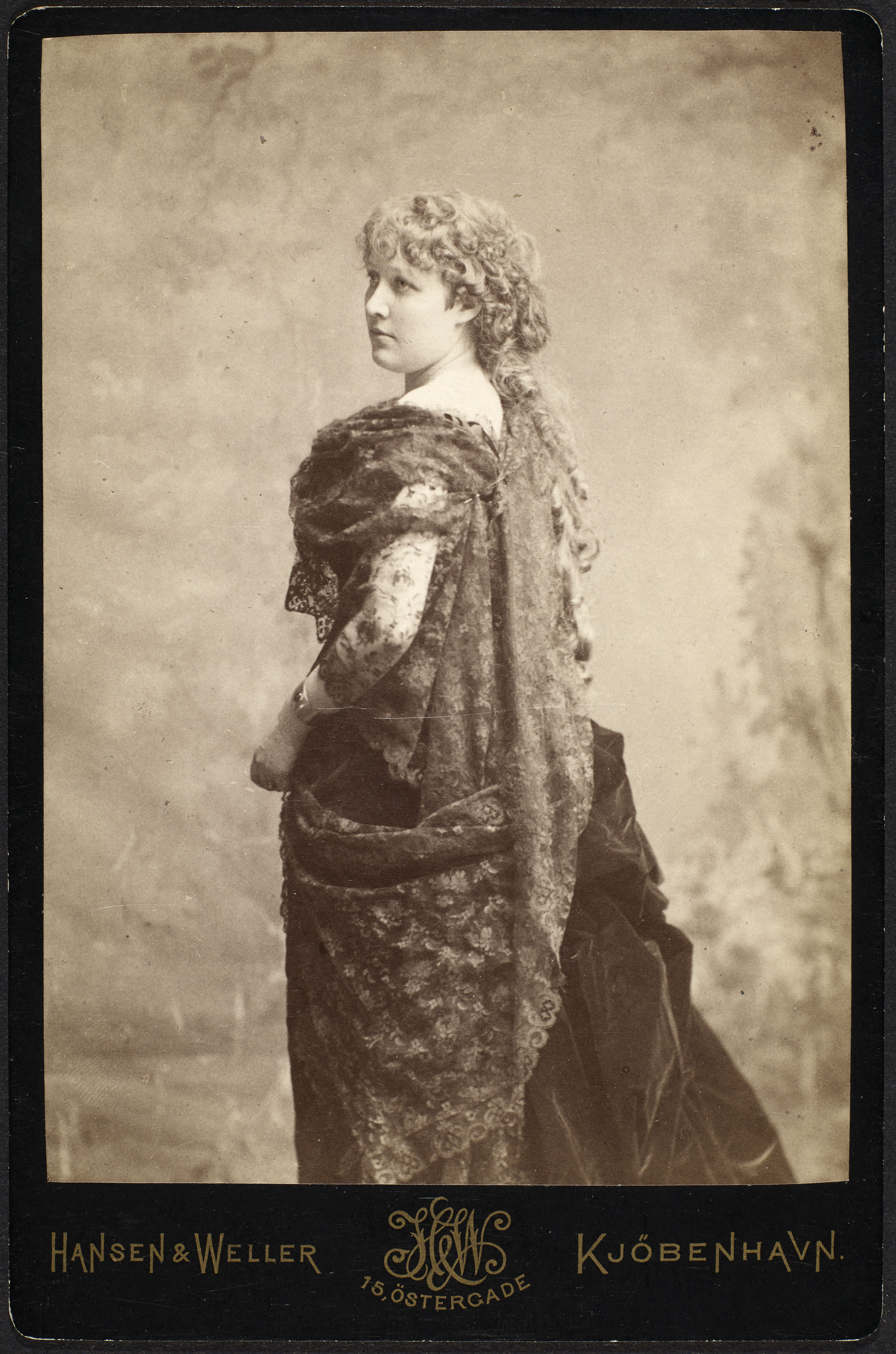
- Born: Augusta Sophie Wilhelmine Schou; 5 October 1855; Copenhagen, Denmark
- Died: 26 September 1910 (aged 54); Copenhagen, Denmark
- Years active: 1876 — 1885
- Spouse: Otto George Lütken
- Children: 3
- Parent(s): Jens August Hammerich, Sophie Frederikke Iversen

Augusta Sophie Wilhelmine Lütken née Schou (1855–1910) was a Danish operatic soprano who, despite her lack of formal schooling, became one of her country's most popular singers in the nine short years she performed at Copenhagen's Royal Danish Theatre. As a result of poor health, she was forced to retire in 1885 although she returned to make a few appearances in the 1890s.

== Early life and family ==
Born on 5 October 1855 in Copenhagen, Augusta Sophie Wilhelmine Schou was the daughter of Jens August Hammerich (1820–97) and Sophie Frederikke Iversen (1822–76). At the time of her birth, her mother was called Schou as the result of her previous marriage. On 6 August 1880, Augusta Schou married the naval officer Otto George Lütken (1849–1906). She had three children: Ellen (1881), Otto (1882) and George (1883).

== Career ==
After training under Carl Helsted (1818–1904), Lütken made her début at the Royal Theatre in 1876 as Vilhelmine in Édouard Du Puy's Youth and Folly (Ungdom og Galskap). Exhibiting an unusually high and clear soprano delivery, she immediately attracted attention. The tall, slender blonde impressed her audiences even more as the Queen of the Night in The Magic Flute, as Zerlina in Don Giovanni and as Susanna in The Marriage of Figaro. While she had a fine natural singing voice, she was less gifted as an actress. As a result of her limitied schooling, her performances in London and Stockholm were not well received. By contrast, in Copenhagen she continued to please her audiences with coloratura performances of Gilda in Rigoletto and Marie in Donizetti's La fille du régiment.

As early as 1885, she had to retire as a result of problems with her legs. In the 1990s, she made a few guest appearances including Venus in Tannhäuser and Isabella in Meyerbeer's Robert le diable but her voice was no longer what it had been and she appeared to have lost her good humour.

Augusta Lütken died in Copenhagen on 26 September 1910.
