= Sedgelands worm-lizard =

Conservation status
- Least Concern (IUCN 3.1)

Scientific classification
- Kingdom: Animalia
- Phylum: Chordata
- Class: Reptilia
- Order: Squamata
- Suborder: Gekkota
- Family: Pygopodidae
- Genus: Aprasia
- Species: A. repens

Binomial name
- Aprasia repens (Fry, 1914)

Species of lizard

The sedgelands worm-lizard (Aprasia repens) is a species of lizard in the Pygopodidae family endemic to Australia.
