= Abbreviata =

Scientific classification
- Kingdom: Animalia
- Phylum: Nematoda
- Class: Chromadorea
- Order: Rhabditida
- Family: Physalopteridae
- Genus: Abbreviata; Travassos, 1920

Genus of nematodes

Abbreviata is a genus of nematodes belonging to the family Physalopteridae.

The genus has almost cosmopolitan distribution.

Species:

- Abbreviata abbreviata (Rudolphi, 1819)
- Abbreviata kazachstanica Markov & Paraskiv, 1956
- Abbreviata turkomanica Andrushko & Markov, 1956
