= Sexual selection in scaled reptiles =

Reptilian behavior to find mates

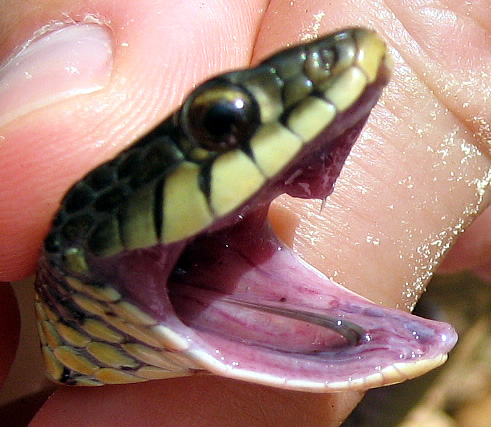
Garter snake

Sexual selection in scaled reptiles studies how sexual selection manifests in snakes and lizards, which constitute the order Squamata of reptiles. Each of the over three thousand snakes use different tactics in acquiring mates. Ritual combat between males for the females they want to mate with includes topping, a behavior exhibited by most viperids in which one male will twist around the vertically elevated fore body of its opponent and forcing it downward. It is common for neck biting to occur while the snakes are entwined.

== Male-male competition ==
=== Snakes ===
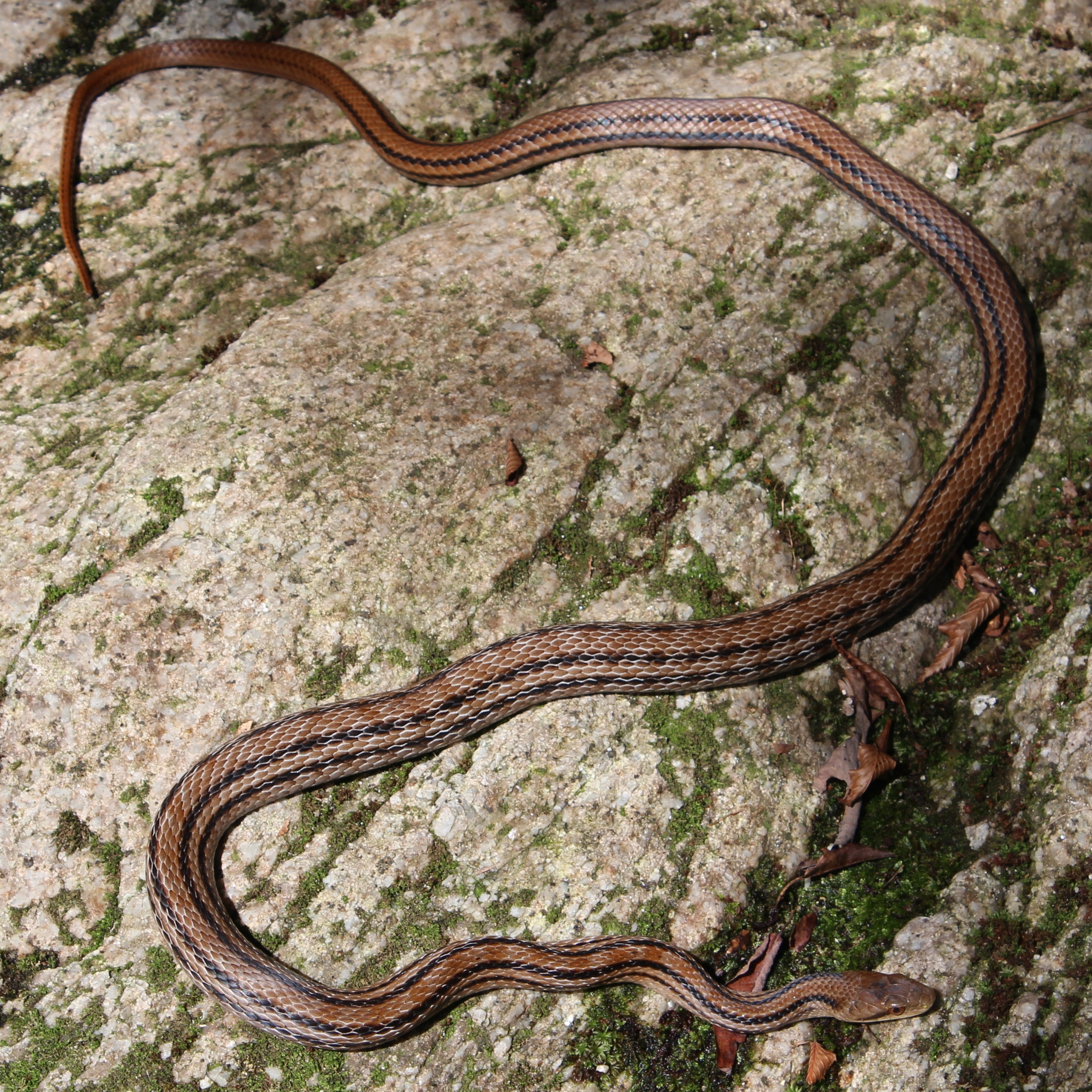
Japanese striped snake

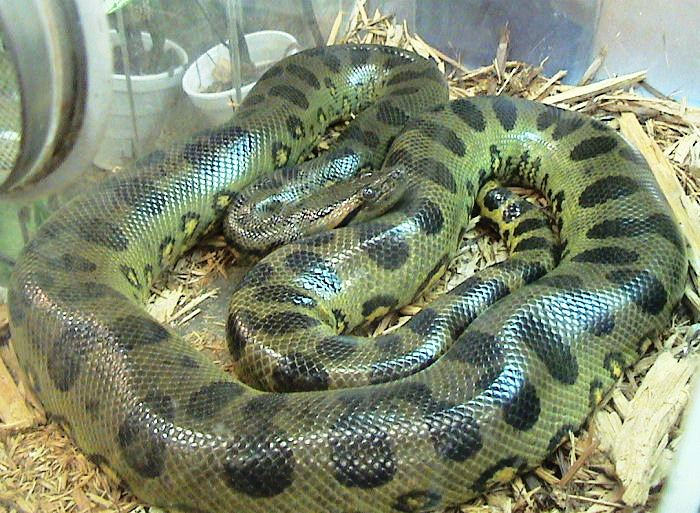
Green Anaconda

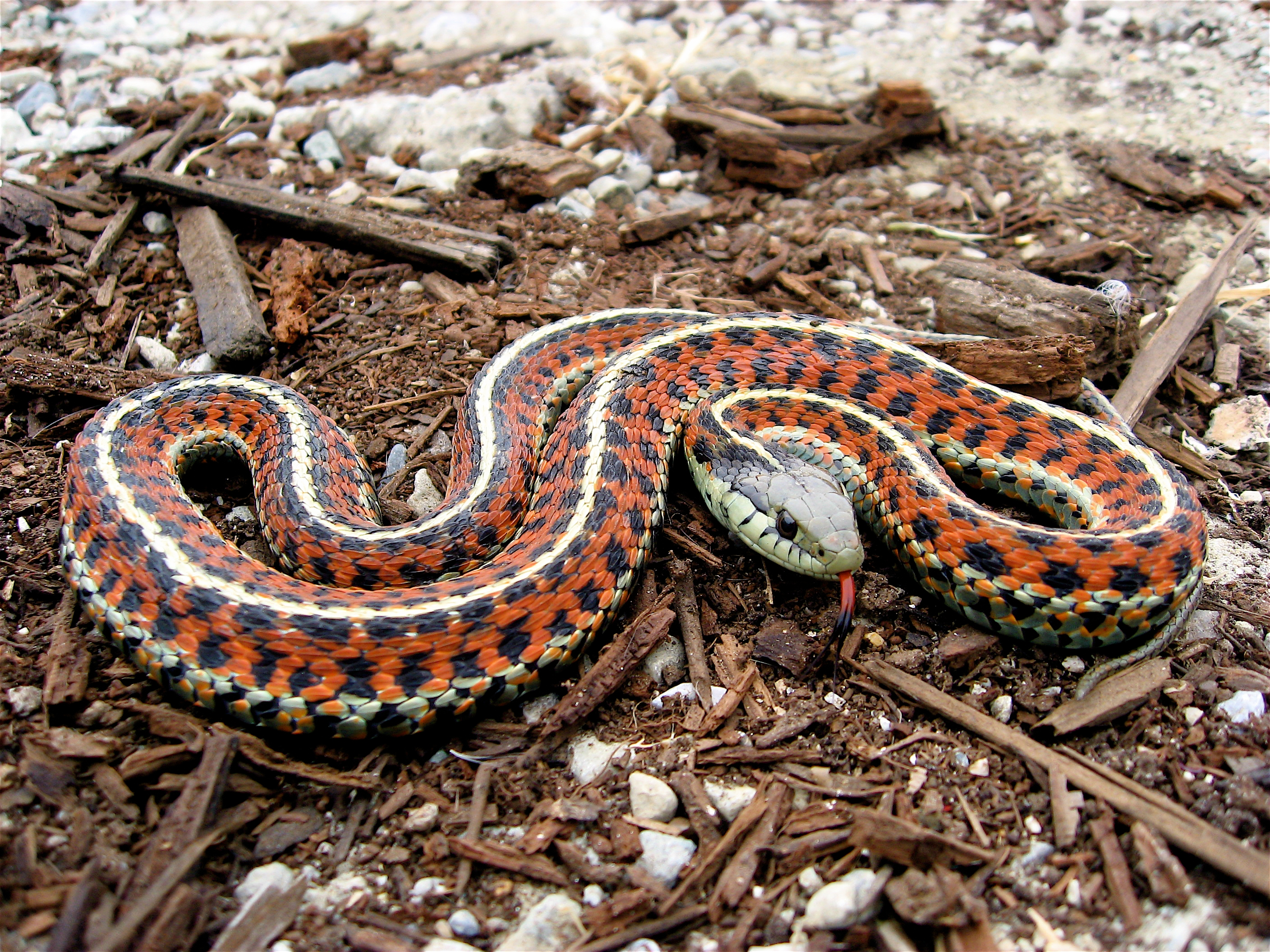
Garter snake

In the species Japanese striped snake (Elaphe quadrivirgata), competition involves males maintaining body contact with their opponent and exerting pressure by pushing, topping, or entwining in order to subdue him.

Male snakes employ a variety of strategies to help them entice the female into mating. The red-sided garter snake (Thamnophis sirtalis) population in Alberta, Canada hibernates for the majority of the year, emerging in early May to copulate and feed. The communal dens have been observed to reach populations of thousands, with females often dispersing from the den rapidly to try to avoid being attacked by a flurry of males. Males must then rely on pheromone-based tracking to locate the females. When multiple males come into contact with a female intra-sexual competition often occurs. Snake species that have largely male-biased sex ratios often have high levels of male-male competition. Males may be under strong selection for the development of a variety of characteristics that aid them in acquiring a mate. The most successful males are the ones that display the most vigor in their efforts. Males who are able to align their body and cloaca, the joint outlet of the reproductive and digestive system, with that of the female for the longest period of time are often the most successful. While attempting cloacal alignment, a male entices a female by pressing his chin along the length of her body and continually attempting to intertwine his own tail with hers. At the same time, the male tries to prevent other males from breeding with the female, using his body to block their access.

When copulation is achieved, a male implements a coercive mating strategy known as caudocephalic waving. The male garter snake strikes his own body against the female in quick repeated intervals. These strikes drive anoxic air from the non-respiratory lung of the female into her respiratory lungs, causing an increase in her stress level. The increase in stress level causes cloacal gaping, allowing for the courting male to more easily insert his reproductive organ into the female.

Snake mating systems are generally believed to be polygynous, where males copulate with multiple females. Many researchers have assumed that multiple male courtships are successful without providing paternity evidence, and mating systems may be more polyandrous, supported by studies of the green anaconda (Eunectes murinus). A population containing hundreds of marked anacondas was observed over a period of several years with forty-five mating aggregations studied. When a female anaconda is ready to find a mate, she lies in an area of shallow water or mud until a male approached her. Some mating aggregations recorded up to thirteen individual males attempting to court the female at once. These interactions sometimes lasted for periods of up to a month, showing that the males put a large amount of their energy into mating attempts. Observation after copulation recorded no evidence of a male anaconda mating with multiple females or even searching for another female after mating. High-energy cost of courting is also apparent in the red-sided garter snake, where the most vigorous males would succeed in copulation. The intensity and amount of energy that male snakes put forth into the courting of females provides evidence for a polyandrous mating system among snake species.

=== Lizards ===
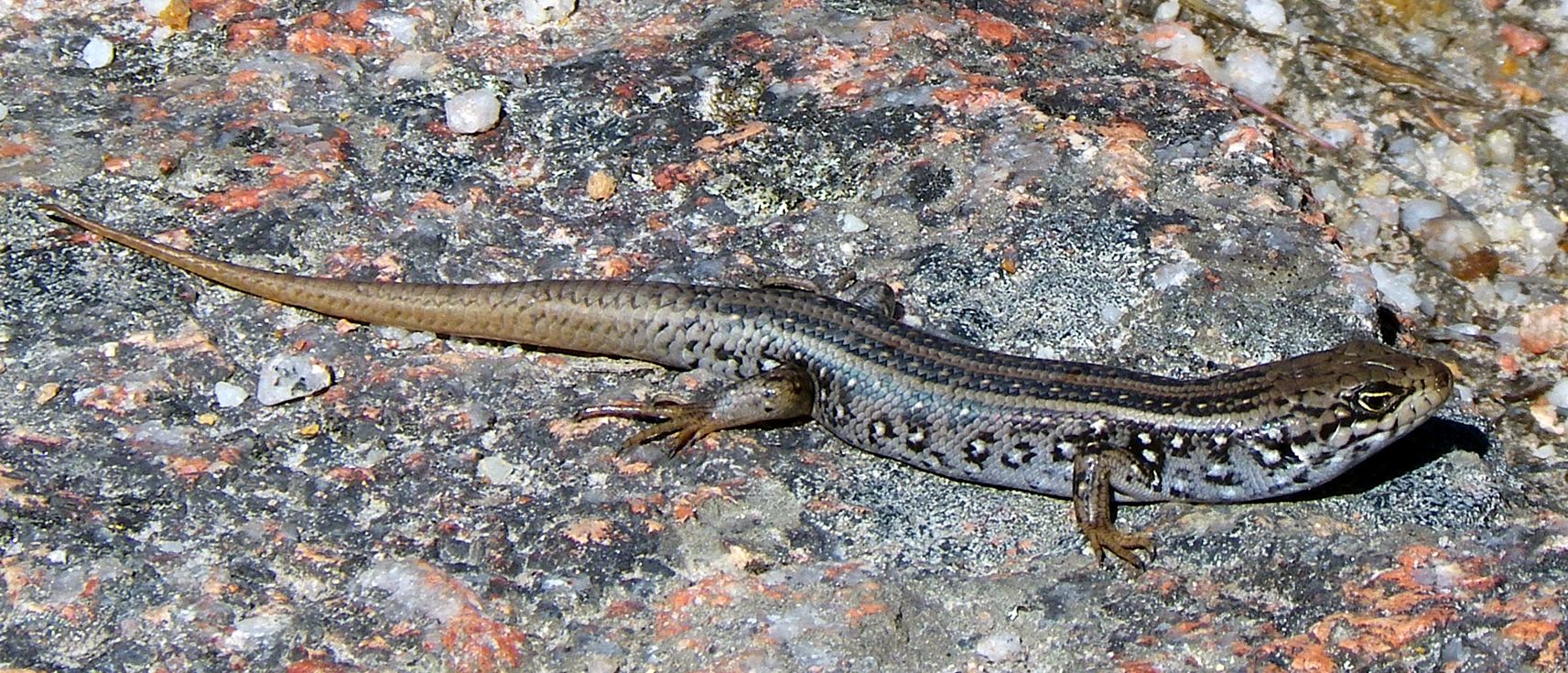
White's skink

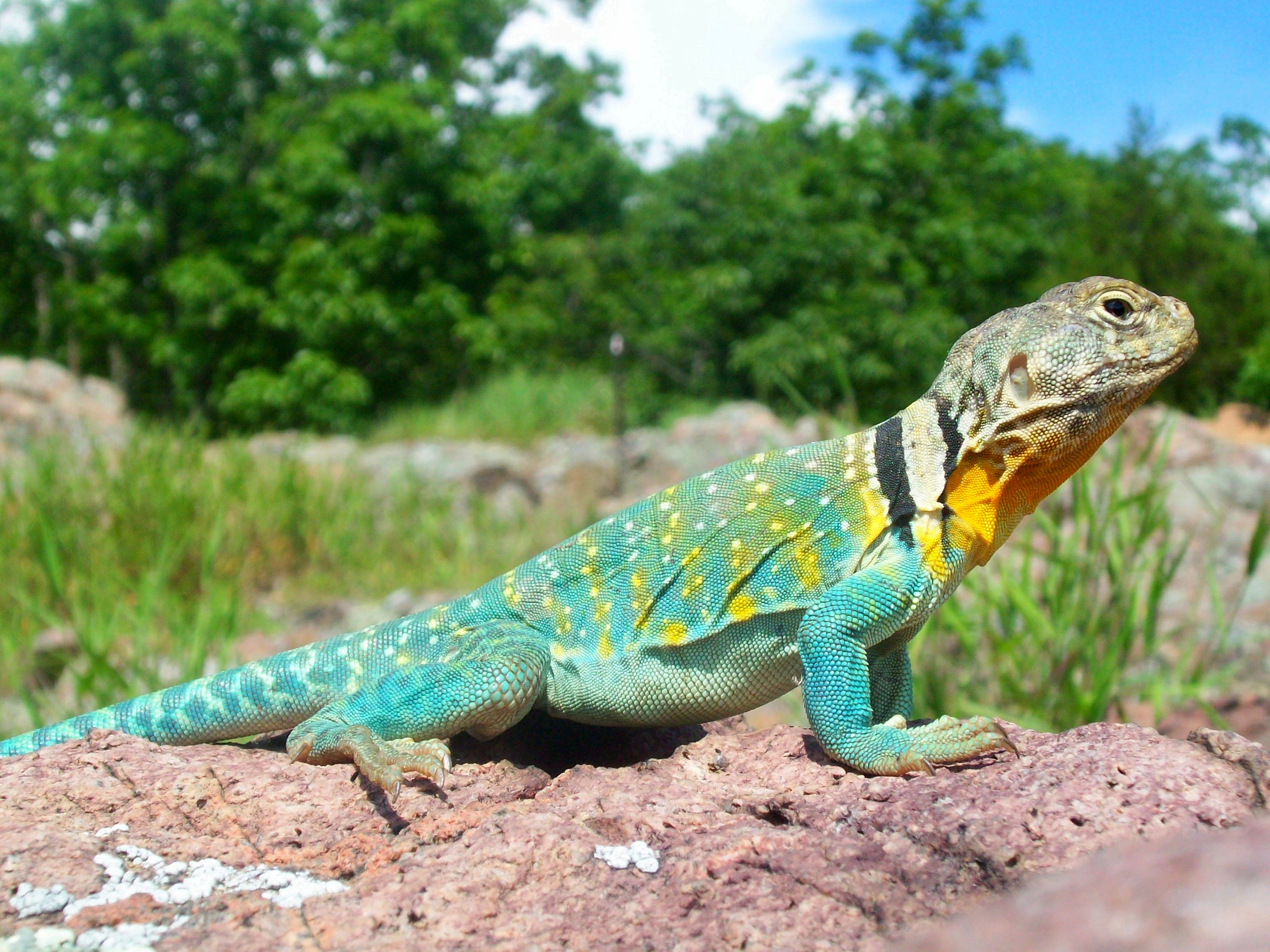
Common collared lizard

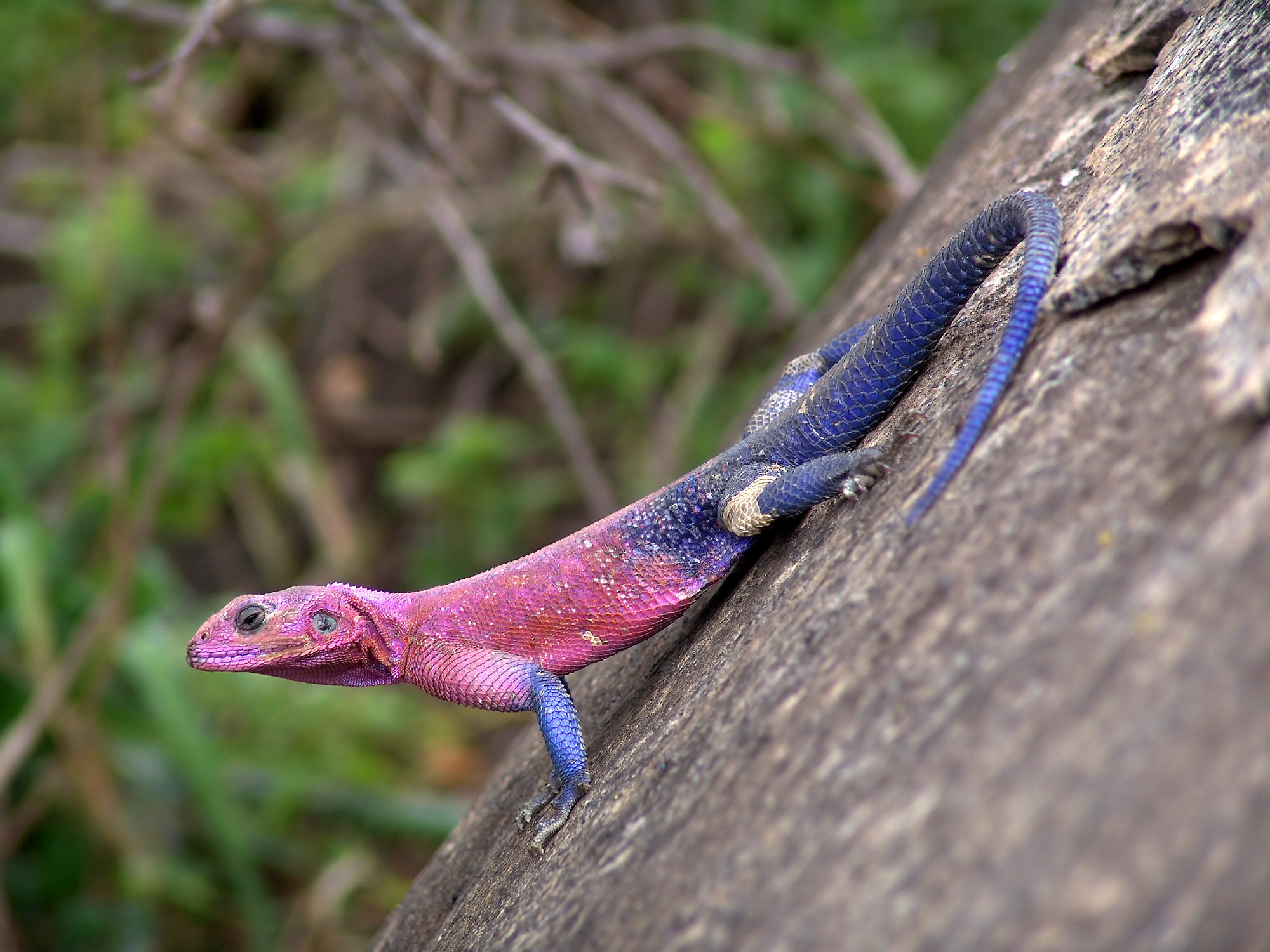
An agamid

Males spend most of their energy in fights over a female to establish dominance and impress females by demonstrating a high quality of fitness. In White's skink (Egernia whitii), in southeastern Australia, larger males with strength and size correlating positively, intimidate rivals with their size, ward off other males from a female and claim territory space. The losers of fights have an increased stress rate and fewer breeding opportunities while fighting among males, which only happens during the breeding season illustrates to a female that he would be able to provide protection for her and her eggs. Some weapons used are spikes on the body and tail, teeth, and claws. An iguana's bite force can result in injury to other males; this leads the weaker male to flee from the fight and abort his chance of trying to mate. Bite-force performance predicts dominance in males and who sires more offspring. Male dominance correlates with a large territory size and access to females. In the common collared lizard Crotaphytus collaris, males display their locomotive skills in order to attract a female by getting to territory and resources first. Faster males have energy to spend when it comes to obtaining food and territory and are protective of their female mate and have a higher reproductive success and mate with more females on a first-come, first-served basis. In Australian agamid lizards, coloration influences competitive success; the more intimidating a male is perceived based on his color, the more likely a weaker male would not want to compete with him for a chance to mate with a female.

== Choice in lizards ==
Males in some lizard species can choose the female they want to mate with. Males prefer more-ornamented females displaying better fitness and fecundity. In striped plateau lizards (Sceloporus virgatus), females during the breeding season develop an orange color on their throat area signaling that they are ready to mate, and it represents a higher quality female (fewer ectoparasites, and larger egg mass).

Females in many lizard species have the choice to mate with or reject males. Females spend energy in investigating a male's traits in order to determine if he is healthy and has good genes. In the species Side-blotched lizard (Uta stansburiana), males chosen by females had 76 percent less ectoparasites. Females who are not sickly can spare the energy in investigating their potential mate's qualities. Females prefer males that can afford to spend the most energy in displaying their traits because it is difficult to fake good genes. In the species Anolis pulchellus, females chose males who defended territory 89% of the time.

Male painted dragon lizards, Ctenophorus pictus, are brightly conspicuous in their breeding coloration. However their color declines with aging. Experiments in which antioxidants were administered to these males led to the conclusion that breeding coloration reflects innate anti-oxidation capability that protects against oxidative damage to DNA. This finding indicates that color acts as a “health certificate” allowing females, during mating, to visualize the underlying oxidative stress induced damage in potential male mating partners.

== Pheromonal cues ==
=== In snakes ===
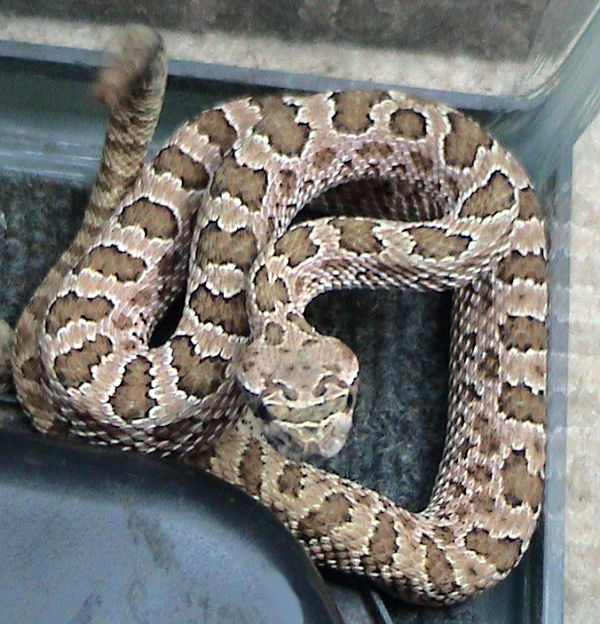
Crotalus viridis nuntius

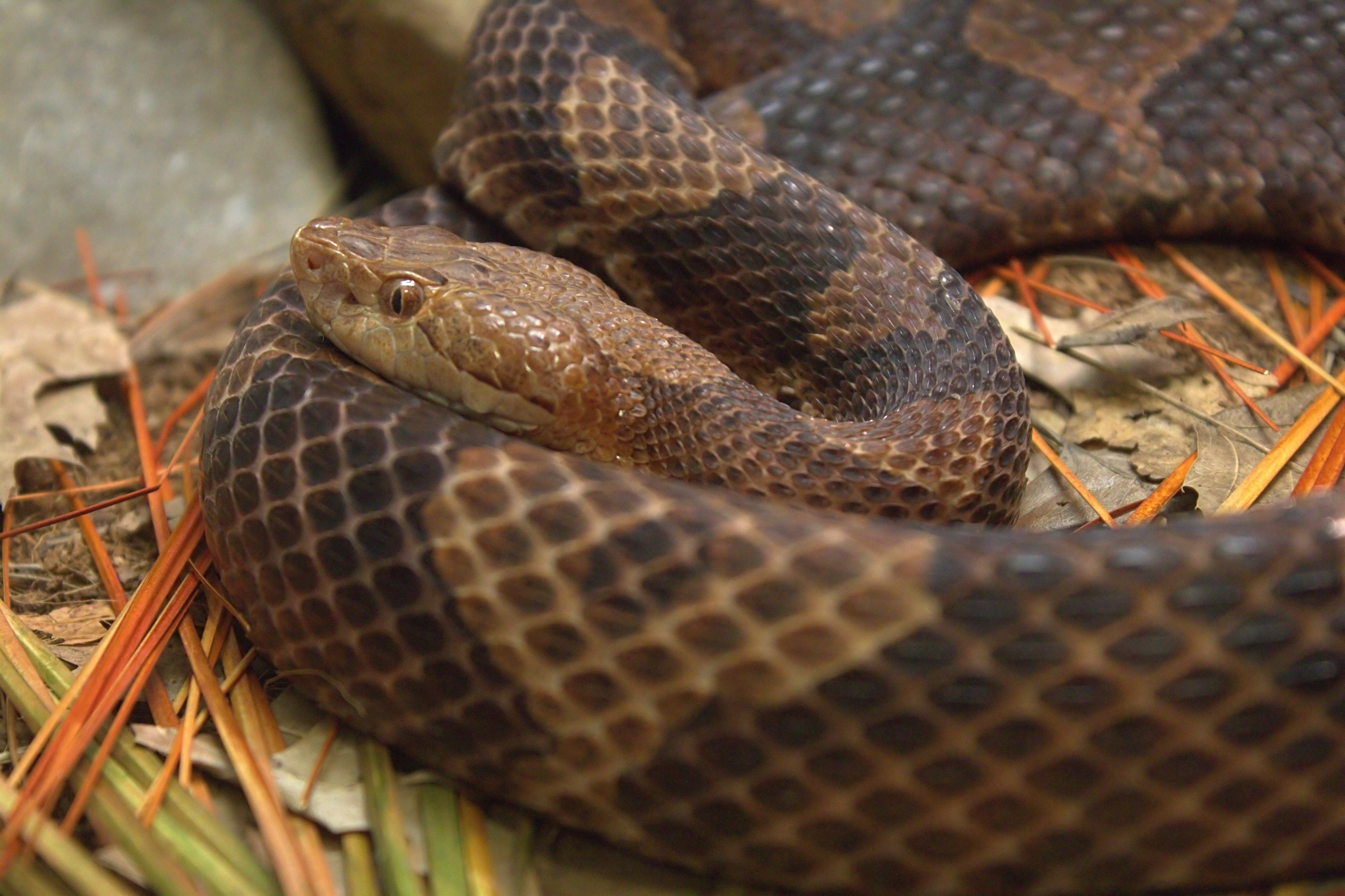
Agkistrodon contortrix

Snakes have two distinctive chemical sensory systems, which have unique roles in the reception and deciphering of various chemical signals: the main olfactory system and the Vomeronasal system, which is used to decipher distinct chemosensory information. In snakes this has a much greater complexity than its olfactory system and is essential for prey tracking as well as mate distinction and courtship.

Snake tongues are bifurcated, or forked, to enhance their ability to pick up pheromones by means of tropotaxis, and so are able to detect different stimuli intensities simultaneously using the two tips, flick them to pick up chemical cues from surrounding objects, which are delivered to the vomeronasal ducts upon reentry of the tongue into the oral cavity, activating the regions of the brain responsible for translation, allowing them to be processed and used for both mate and prey location. In nearly all snake species, the males are the mate-searching sex, and sometimes must travel a great distance to find a female.

Examples. A study done on prairie rattlesnakes, Crotalus viridis, indicates that males who maintain a constant search for females over fixed areas tend to be more successful in copulating. This population is very male-biased, so males had to focus more on locating a mate and were less concerned with male-male competition. In red-sided garter snakes, it has found that the amount of rival males, the length of time the chemical substrates last, and the distance over which the trail is evident are significant factors influencing a male's success rate in finding a female. Thamnophis sirtalis parietalis often prefer the pheromone trails of females who occupied the same communal den as males.

In less male-biased scenarios, a male's tongue length plays an essential role in sexual selection. Dimensions of the copperhead, Agkistrodon contortrix, show a significant tongue size difference, with males having a greater tongue bifurcation length, supporting the hypothesis that sexual selection is acting on tongue size in male snakes in order to enhance their ability to locate a potential female mate.

=== In lizards ===
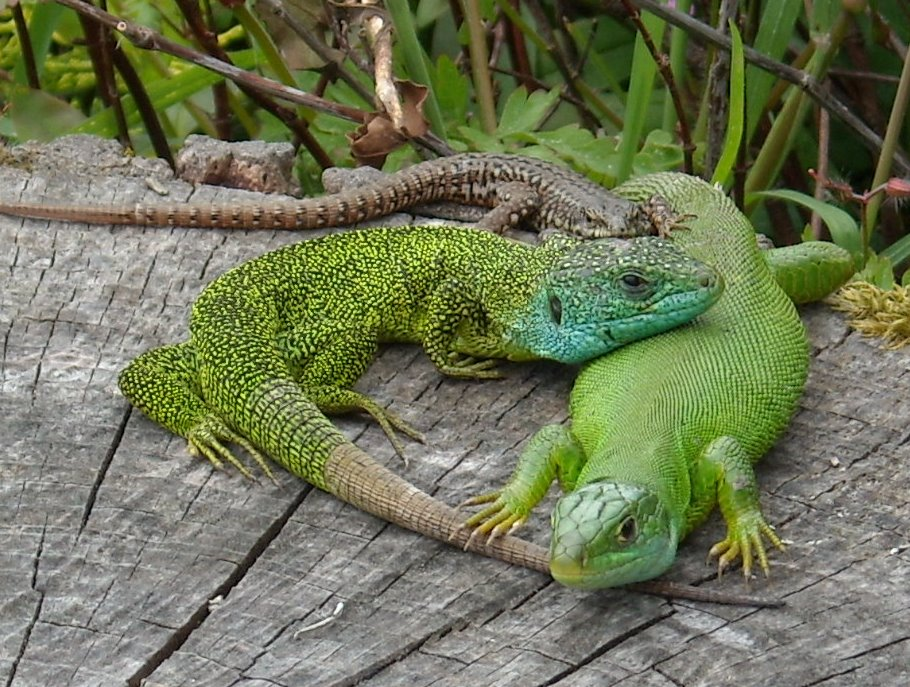
European green lizards

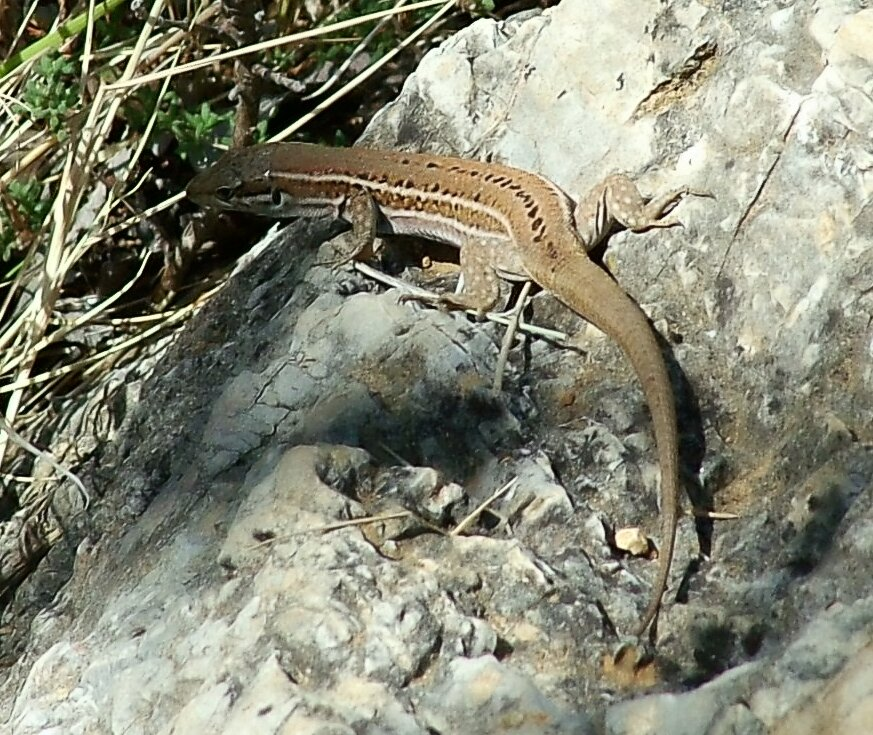
Dalmatian wall lizard

Females can determine a male's fitness based on the pheromones he leaves in an environment. These chemical cues inform females of a male's quality, with males trying to impress future mates by displaying elaborate colors, which can signal to a female that he is healthy, disease free, or has good genes, as seen in the Dalmatian wall lizard Podarcis melisellensis, whose identity is based on their morph color: yellow, orange, the dominant colour as such lizards have a larger size and bite force so they can ward off competing males in order to mate with a female of choice and claim territory, and blue. The females prefer the orange males since they are bigger and healthier and can give a female's offspring higher quality benefits. Even though females prefer to mate with orange morphs, females will still mate with yellow morphs, who give females direct benefits like protection and a small territory. Blue males are only able to mate by intruding on another male's territory and mating with other their females. What these lizards portray is the rock-paper-scissors game. In the species Uta stansburiana, throat coloration was also used as a way for males to elaborate their good health and body conditions to females. This is another example of the rock-paper-scissors game. The male European green lizards develop a blue throat patch, which shows high reflectance in the ultraviolet (UV) range, which females prefer since throat brightness correlates with a larger body size, a larger head size and less ectoparasites, though it is costly in energy. Females can then rely on throat color in male European green lizards to be an honest signal.

== Sexual conflict in snakes ==
Sexual dimorphisms are phenotypic differences between males and females of the same species. The objective of many sexual dimorphic studies done on snakes focuses more on broad comparisons between species from different regions and less on individual species themselves. Size dimorphisms are common in snakes; females tend to be larger in populations where the production of large liters is feasible. Males tend to be larger in mating systems in which male-male competition is a large factor. Hydrophiid snakes, otherwise known as sea snakes, have only recently evolved from terrestrial elapids. Sea snake scales differ from that of terrestrial snakes because they are rugose and wrinkled. Male sea snakes scale rugosity is more developed than that of the female snakes. The male turtle headed sea snake, Emydocephalus annulatus, provides an interesting case study because of their unique scales. Females of this species display smooth scales year round. Males, on the other hand, show a shift from smooth scales to ridged scales upon the arrival of the winter breeding season. There are multiple reasons why this trait could have been selected. Scale rugosity in males allows for a better tactile resistance during mating than non rugose scales. Also, it has been shown that rugose scales provide a more efficient oxygen uptake system by means of diffusion. During courting, males often lose mating opportunities because they deplete their oxygen stores and must return to the surface to breathe. Rugose skin provides a solution to this problem; its structure helps to increase the rate of oxygen diffusion, allowing for males to dive for longer periods.

== Post-copulatory ==
=== In snakes ===
Snake sperm morphology and function is highly influenced by their ability to find, interact with, and fertilize eggs. Snake species display extended copulations and higher gonad mass/body mass proportions in males than other reptilian taxonomic groups. Furthermore, their mating systems have a wide range of variability, depending on the temporal availability and predictability of the females. These factors influence sperm competition levels in both intense male-male combative species and those species that participate in prolonged mate searching.

Oviparous species show relatively larger testes and sperm midpiece length than viviparous species because oviparous species often reproduce annually as opposed to the bi annual cycle of the viviparous species. Because the oviparous species reproduce less frequently, these traits may have been selected to generate stronger propulsions, develop more mitochondria and increase the amount of sperm per ejaculate to help aid in the sperms success rate.

Often in snake species, females will copulate with multiple males in one mating aggregation. To increase his chances in paternity, a male will sometimes try to inhibit the female from re-mating. A common tactic in many species is to obstruct the reproductive pathway of the female in order to physically prevent additional copulations. The mating plug of T.s. parietalis is a jellylike blob produced by males that is implanted within the females reproductive tract. Retention of the plug can last from two days to two weeks, with maximal effectiveness declining after the two-day mark. The plug functions to prevent the leakage of the male's sperm from the female's cloaca, reduce the attractiveness and receptivity of the female to further copulations, and to physically block the reproductive tract to prevent immediate re-mating. The plug is not always 100% effective, but re-mating is a rare occurrence while the plug is in place.

=== Cryptic female lizards ===
Females store sperm after copulation from multiple males before ovulation, but how sperm is stored is still unknown. There is a time gap between sperm copulation and fertilization. This time gap allows the female to mate with multiple males. The most competitive sperm will fertilize the female's eggs while the remaining sperm will be discarded. Females also gain nutrients from sperm storage so the more a female mates with different males the more nutritional access she will obtain. After copulation, some female lizard species chose the sex of their offspring based on the male's sperm. Females produce sons with sperm from larger sires, and daughters from sperm with smaller sires. A reason would be to ensure that her sons will have good genes that can display stronger more elaborate traits in order to maximize his reproductive success. An increase in the production of sons demonstrates a preference for larger males. Daughters are produced from smaller sires since females do not need to use a large amount of energy to attract a male; more males are ready to mate than females. However, if females store sperm from a variety of sires, females can produce both sons and daughters with high fitness.

=== Inbreeding avoidance ===
When the female sand lizard Lacerta agilis mates with two or more males, sperm competition within the female's reproductive tract may occur. Active selection of sperm by females appears to occur in a manner that enhances female fitness. On the basis of this selective process, the sperm of males that are more distantly related to the female are preferentially used for fertilization, rather than the sperm of close relatives. This preference may enhance the fitness of progeny by reducing inbreeding depression.

== Environmental stimuli in snakes ==
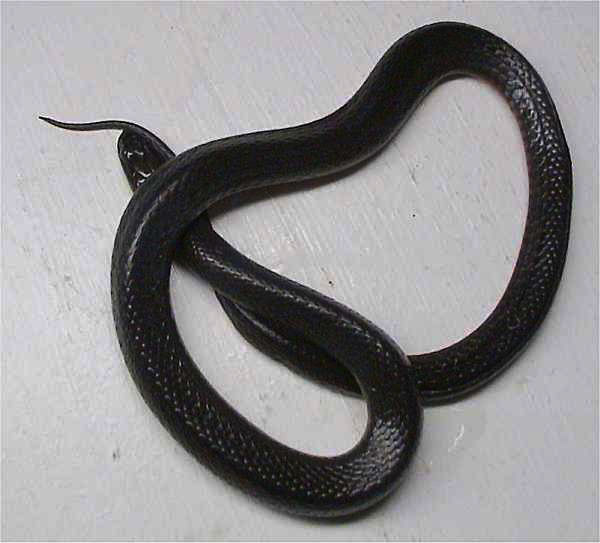
Seminatrix pygaea

The semi-aquatic black swamp snake, Seminatrix pygaea, which lives in an environment where periods of drought are very common, has shown that environmental factors have a negative effect on female snakes whose large size was selected to increase fecundity as these droughts create a unique scenario to test whether survivability or reproductive pressures influence female body size more. Females grow to be larger than males because there is no male-male competition. At the same time, selection acts on female size in order to increase fecundity.

After the drought period larger snakes, both male and female, were less likely to survive, with a larger decline in the female population, mainly because female snakes had a greater body size compared to males. This correlates with the majority of Seminatrix pygaea giving birth at the start of the dry season, giving them some time to recover from the energy depletion they suffered from birthing clutches of offspring, showing that selection favors smaller snakes in times of drought and larger snakes during years of high food abundance, and providing evidence that environmental factors affect sexual selection.
