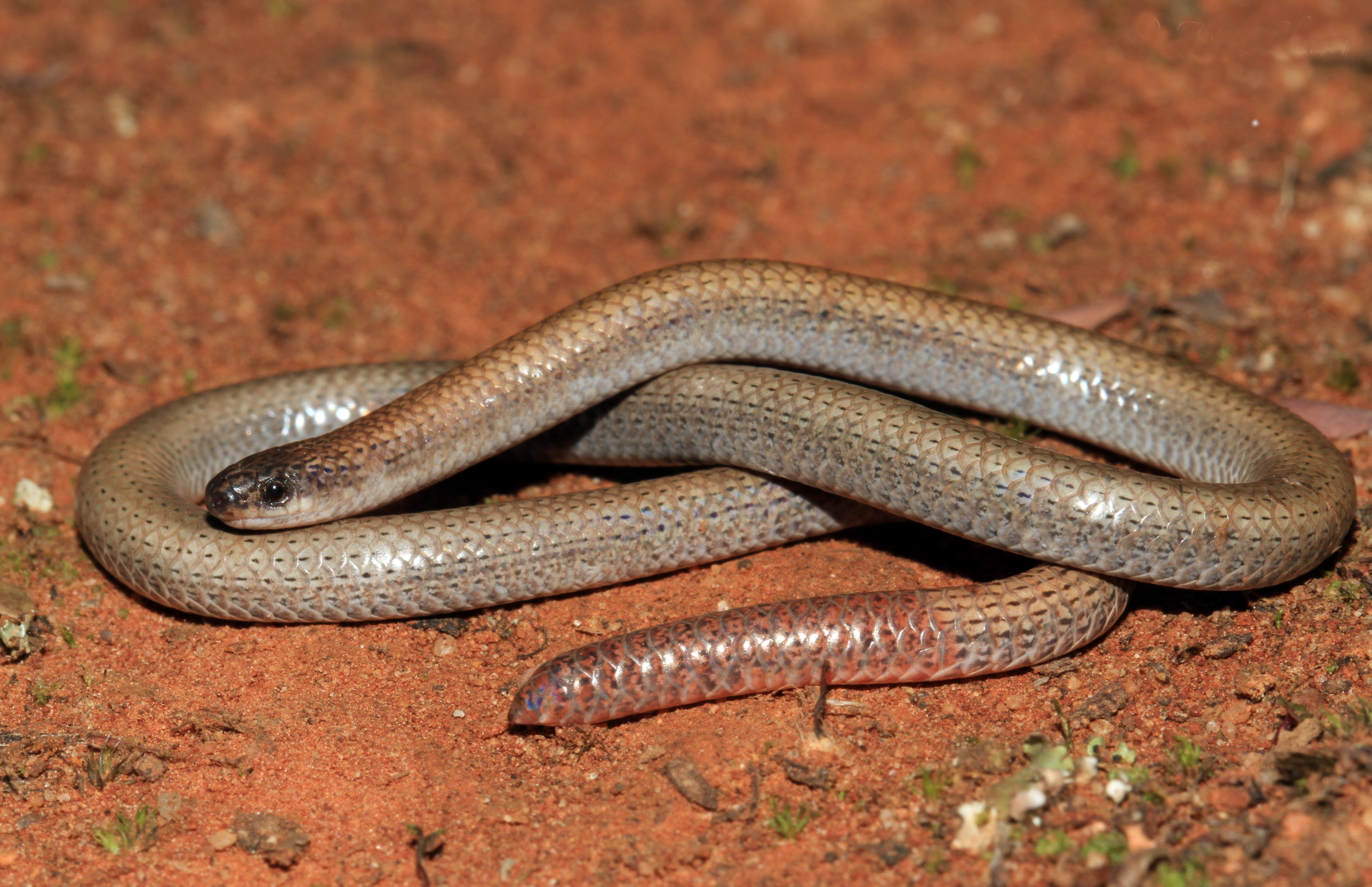

Conservation status
- Least Concern (IUCN 3.1)

Scientific classification
- Kingdom: Animalia
- Phylum: Chordata
- Class: Reptilia
- Order: Squamata
- Suborder: Gekkota
- Family: Pygopodidae
- Genus: Aprasia
- Species: A. parapulchella

Binomial name
- Aprasia parapulchella Kluge, 1974

= Pink-tailed worm-lizard =

Species of lizard

The pink-tailed worm-lizard or granite worm-lizard (Aprasia parapulchella) is a rare legless lizard found in Australia. The animal looks like a combination of small snake and worm. Its total length is up to 14 cm. It has a pink tail and is white underneath. The head and neck are brown, and the rest of the top of the body is pale grey. Scales on the back each have a dark bar, giving the appearance of dots down the back. It is found on two hills near Tarcutta, Bathurst, New South Wales, Bendigo in Victoria, and along the sides of the Molonglo River and Murrumbidgee River and on Mount Taylor in the Australian Capital Territory. The lizards eat invertebrates that live under rocks. They can be found under rocks sized from 0.15 to 0.6 m. Their main diet is ant eggs, particularly from Iridomyrmex species and Rhytidoponera metallica.

== Genetics ==
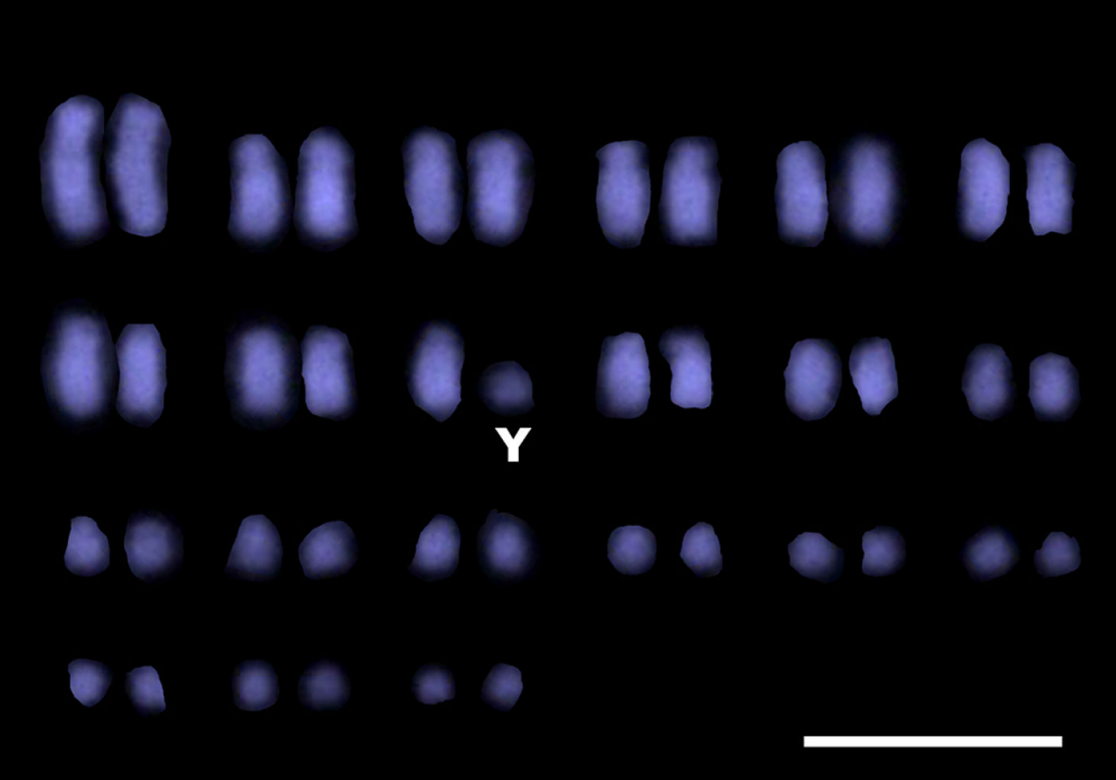
Karyotype of male lizard with Y chromosome indicated

Aprasia parapulchella cells have 42 chromosomes in the diploid state. Males of the species have a heteromorphic pair of chromosomes (a pair of two different ones), termed XY, and the females have a pair of same XX chromosomes. The microsatellite (AGAT)_{8} is strongly repeated near the Y chromosome centromere. The Y chromosome also contains the (AC)_{15} motif, whereas the X chromosome does not. (AC)_{15} also shows up on another two pairs of small and large chromosomes.

== Anatomy ==
The head and tail are both rounded in shape. It differs from a snake in that scaly hind limb flaps are present. Also, its tongue is not forked, but is flat and long. There are no ears visible.

Species-specific characteristics include absence of pattern on the side of the head, two preocular scales and three preanal scales are present, and the first upper labial scale and nasal scale are fused.

Weights of the lizards can range from 0.1 to 4.0 g. At 1 year old, they are around 6 cm from snout to vent, in the second year they reach 8 cm, and in the third year 9.6 cm. Adult males over 3 years old average 10.9 cm and females are slightly bigger at 12 cm.

== Threats ==
The lizard is threatened by habitat fragmentation, removal of rock, grazing, tree planting, weeds, and ploughing.
