= Aprasia rostrata =

Conservation status
- Vulnerable (IUCN 3.1)

Scientific classification
- Kingdom: Animalia
- Phylum: Chordata
- Class: Reptilia
- Order: Squamata
- Suborder: Gekkota
- Family: Pygopodidae
- Genus: Aprasia
- Species: A. rostrata

Binomial name
- Aprasia rostrata Parker, 1956

Species of lizard

Aprasia rostrata, also known as the Hermite Island worm-lizard or Exmouth worm-lizard, is a species of lizard in the Pygopodidae family endemic to the Montebello Islands, Australia.

== History ==
Two specimens of A. rostrata were collected from the Montebello Islands in 1952, before the Operation Hurricane nuclear test. Subsequent surveys decades later failed to find more specimens, and concerns were raised that the lizard's geographic restriction meant it was vulnerable and likely to become extinct. They were not successfully located again until 2006, when four individual specimens were collected from under Acacia coriacea stumps with live ant colonies. The survey demonstrated that A. rostrata is not extinct despite the nuclear test and introduction of other species to the islands, such as black rats. In 2007, the "rediscovery" was published in The Western Australian Naturalist.
