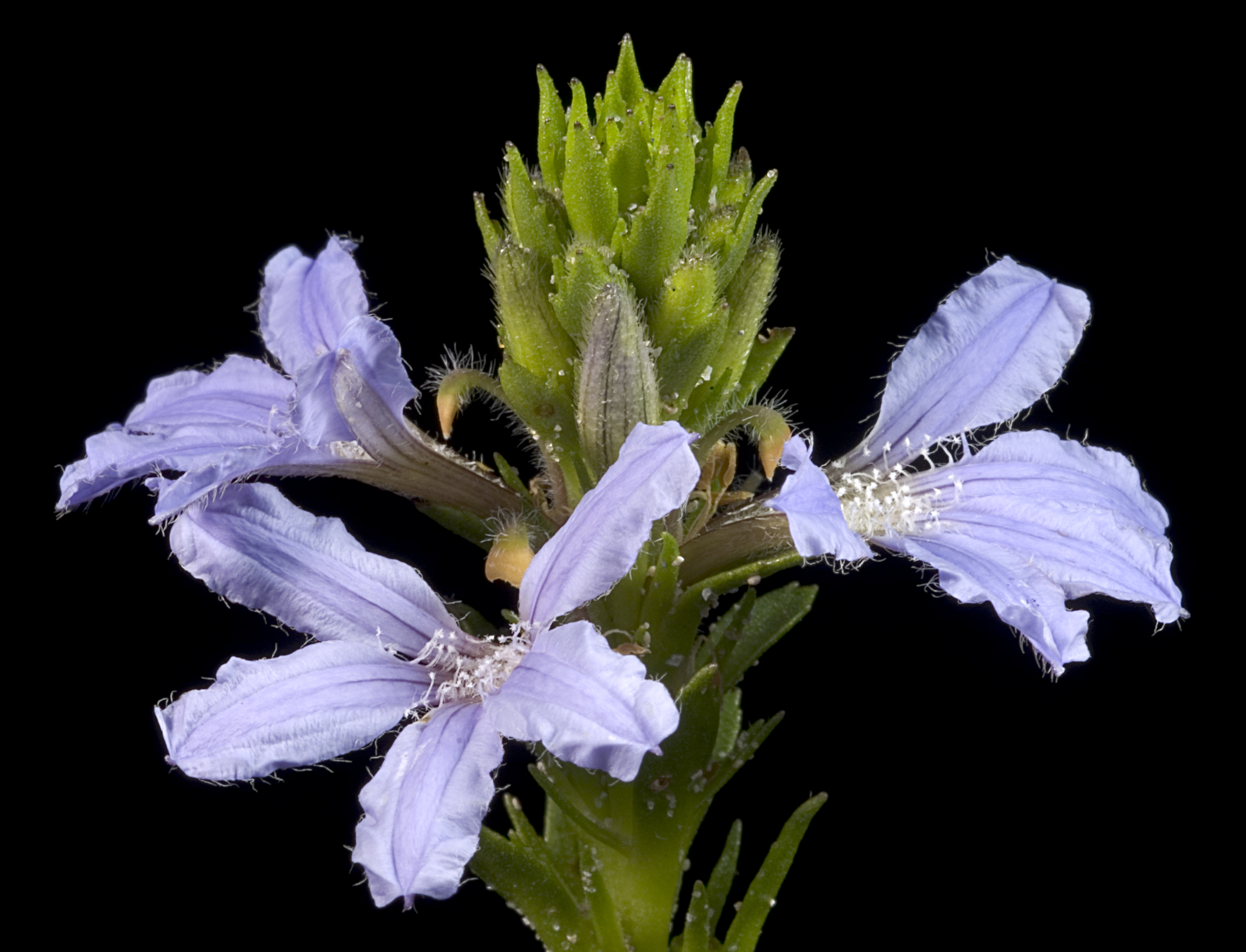

Scientific classification
- Kingdom: Plantae
- Clade: Embryophytes
- Clade: Tracheophytes
- Clade: Spermatophytes
- Clade: Angiosperms
- Clade: Eudicots
- Clade: Asterids
- Order: Asterales
- Family: Goodeniaceae
- Genus: Scaevola
- Species: S. nitida

Binomial name
- Scaevola nitida R.Br.
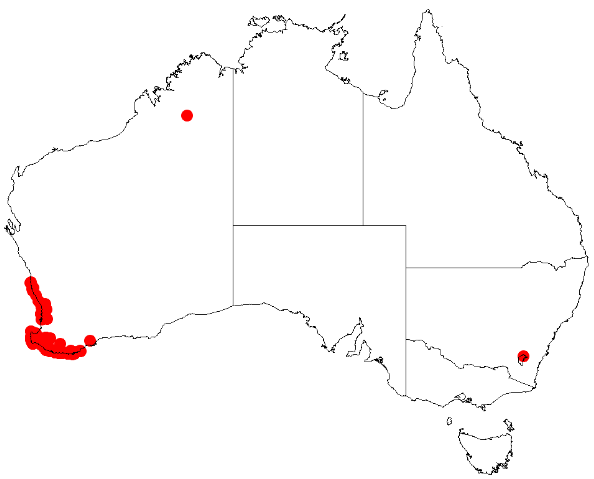
- Occurrence data from AVH

Synonyms
- Lobelia attenuata (R.Br.) Kuntze nom. illeg.; Lobelia nitida (R.Br.) Kuntze nom. illeg.; Merkusia aemula de Vriese nom. illeg.; Merkusia attenuata (R.Br.) de Vriese; Merkusia fastigiata (de Vriese) de Vriese; Merkusia multiflora (Lindl.) de Vriese; Merkusia nitida (R.Br.) de Vriese; Scaevola attenuata R.Br.; Scaevola drummondii DC.; Scaevola fastigiata de Vriese; Scaevola multiflora Lindl.; Scaevola multiflora var. microstachya de Vriese; Scaevola multiflora Lindl. var. multiflora

= Scaevola nitida =

Species of shrub

Scaevola nitida, commonly known as shining fanflower, is a species of flowering plant in the family Goodeniaceae and is endemic to the south-west of Western Australia. It is a spreading, glabrous shrub with sessile, egg-shaped to narrowly elliptic leaves with toothed edges, spikes of blue to lilac flowers, and cylindrical fruit.

== Description ==
Scaevola nitida is a spreading, glabrous shrub that typically grows up to 3 m (9.8 ft) and is sticky when young. Its leaves are sessile, egg-shaped with the narrower end towards the base, to narrowly elliptic, 20–87 mm (0.79–3.43 in) long and 7–40 mm (0.28–1.57 in) wide with toothed edges. The flowers are borne in spikes up to 65 mm (2.6 in) long on the ends of branches with lance-shaped to egg-shaped bracts 8–23 mm (0.31–0.91 in) long and linear bracteoles 5–9 mm (0.20–0.35 in) long. The sepals are rim-like, 0.3 mm (0.012 in) high and the petals blue to lilac, 13–20 mm (0.51–0.79 in) long, with soft hairs or glabrous on the outside and bearded inside. The ovary has two locules. Flowering occurs from August to December and the fruit is cylindrical and grooved, up to 4 mm (0.16 in) long and glabrous.

== Taxonomy ==
Scaevola nitida was first formally described in 1810 by Robert Brown in his Prodromus Florae Novae Hollandiae et Insulae Van Diemen. The specific epithet (nitida) means 'bright' or 'shining', referring to the leaves.

== Distribution and habitat ==
This species of Scaevola occurs on coastal limestone cliffs and dunes in sand or clay, from north of Perth to near Albany in the Esperance Plains, Geraldton Sandplains, Jarrah Forest, Swan Coastal Plain, and Warren bioregions of south-western Western Australia.

== Conservation status ==
Scaevola nitida is listed as 'not threatened' by the Government of Western Australia Department of Biodiversity, Conservation and Attractions.
