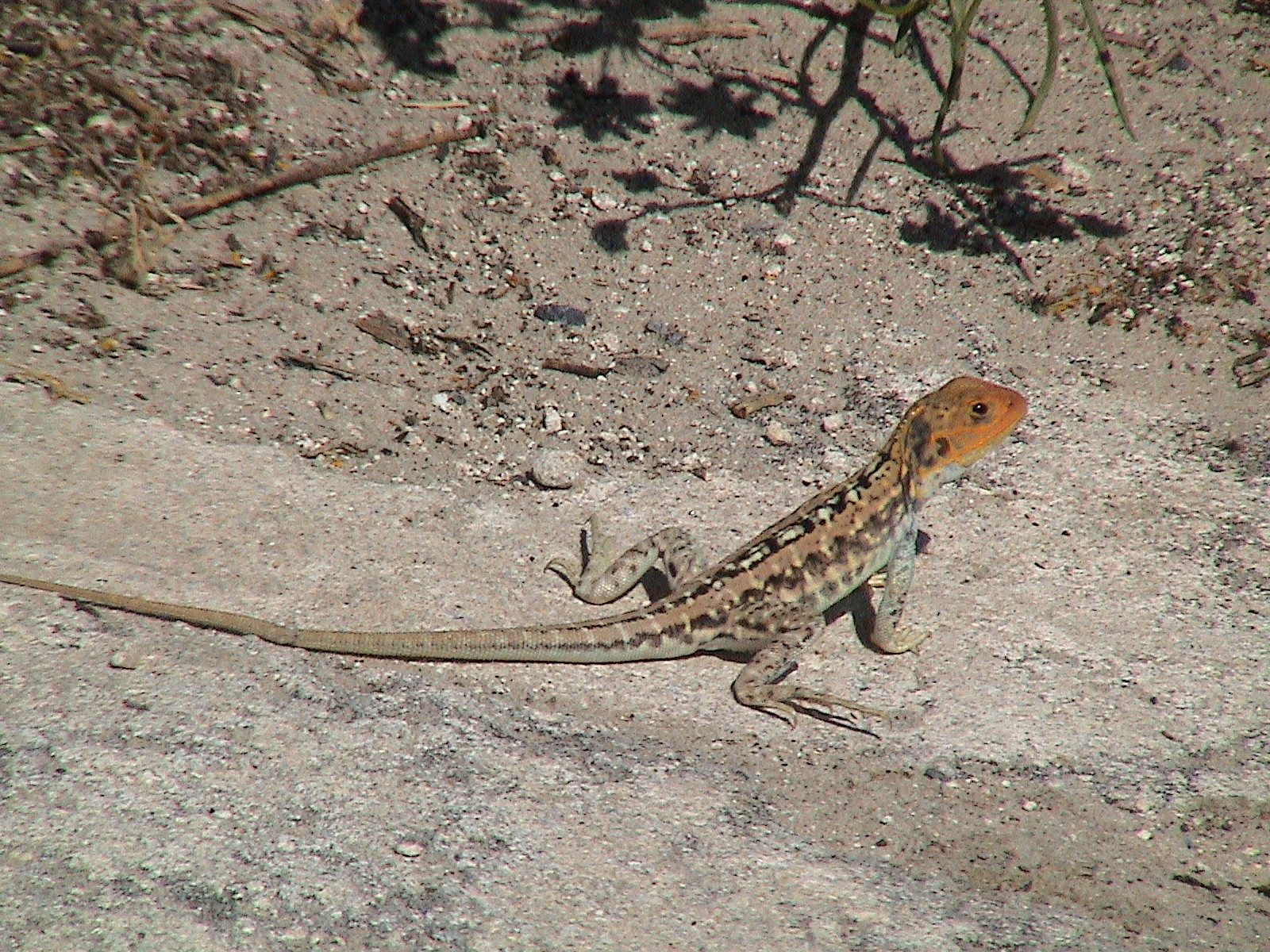
- Ctenophorus pictus, painted dragon

Conservation status
- Least Concern (IUCN 3.1)

Scientific classification
- Kingdom: Animalia
- Phylum: Chordata
- Class: Reptilia
- Order: Squamata
- Suborder: Iguania
- Family: Agamidae
- Genus: Ctenophorus
- Species: C. pictus

Binomial name
- Ctenophorus pictus (W. Peters, 1866)

Synonyms
- Amphibolurus pictus W. Peters, 1866; Ctenophorus pictus — Cogger, 2000

= Ctenophorus pictus =

Species of lizard

Ctenophorus pictus, commonly known as the painted ground-dragon or painted dragon, is a species of lizard from the family Agamidae. It is endemic to the drier areas of southern and central Australia.

== Description ==
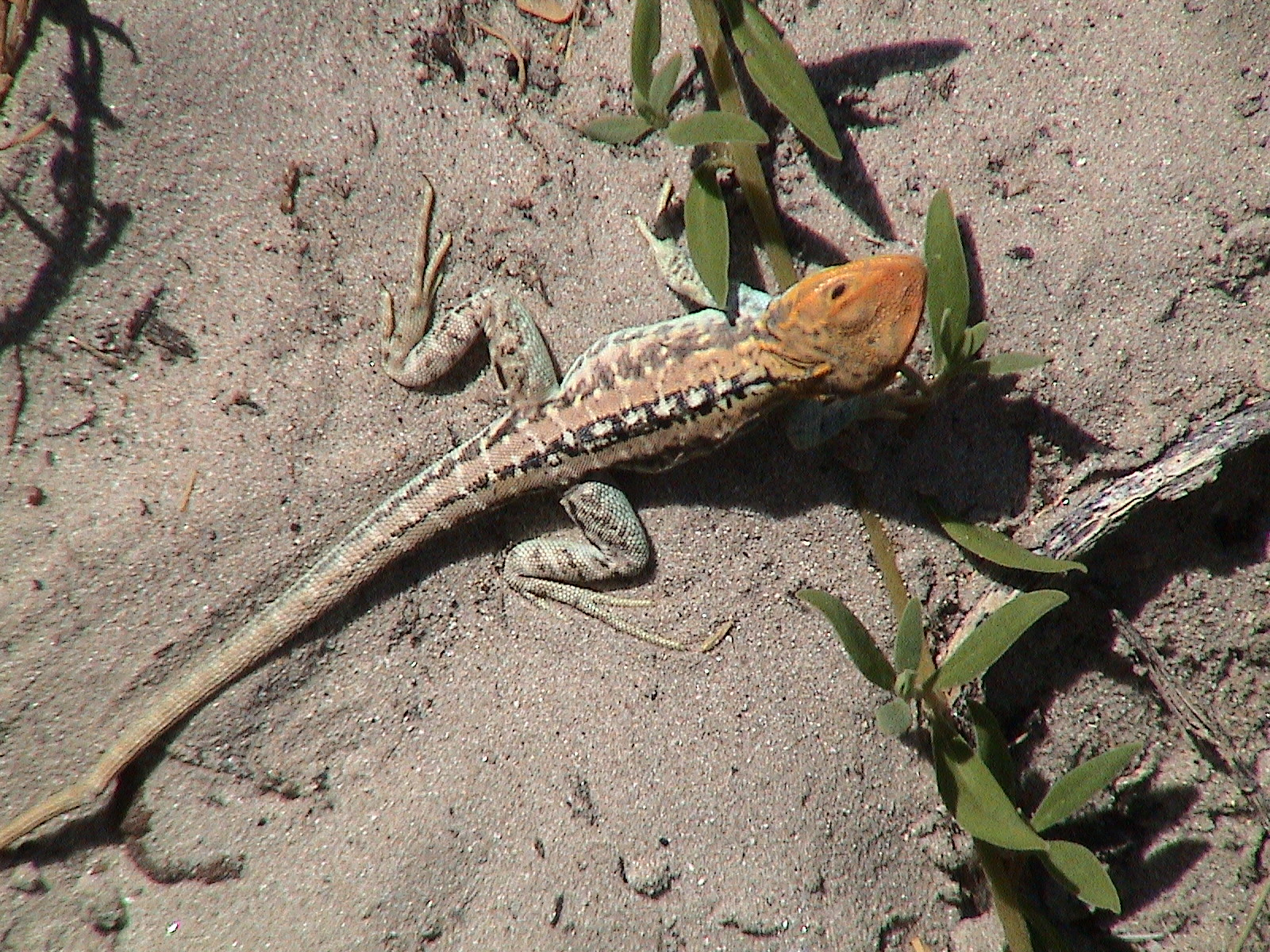
Painted dragon dorsal view

The painted dragon is a medium-sized terrestrial lizard with a short, deep head and uniform body scales. The appearance of this species is extremely variable as it can appear in a number of different colour combinations. Adult males can be brown, yellowish brown, orange to reddish brown with dark-edged pale bars, blotches or spots overlaying a dark vertebral stripe. The flanks are spotted, variegated (irregular patches/streaks), or reticulated (net-like pattern) with dark brown and dotted with scattered, pale, dark-edged spots which will sometimes be aligned perpendicular to the vertebral stripe. The limbs are variegated and the pattern on the tail is often obscure but broad dark bands at the base. Breeding males will exhibit a bright blue flush over the lower lips, throat and limbs and a bright yellow to orange flush over the anterior chest and shoulders. Adult females and juveniles are duller in colour, lacking the bright blue and yellow pigment with females being commonly found in a rusty brown colour.

The scales, though varying slightly in size in different parts, are relatively uniform across the body and are smooth to the touch. A low crest on the back of the neck is often present which males will raise when alarmed and usually a distinct vertebral series of slightly enlarged scales can be found along the back. The ears are exposed on the side of its head and it has rather large and conspicuous eardrums.

Adults will grow to a full length of around 18–25 cm (7.1–9.8 in), with a snout-to-vent length of about 7.5 cm (3.0 in). The tail of this species usually accounts for about 65% of its total body length.

== Distribution and habitat ==
Painted dragons are found throughout the drier parts of southeastern Western Australia, across South Australia to northwestern Victoria and central-western New South Wales. They prefer semi-arid to arid regions, favouring shrublands and hummock grasslands on sandy and saline soils.

== Ecology ==
Like most agamids, painted dragons are swift-moving reptiles, capable of impressive sprints over short distances. This diurnal (day-active) lizard, like the majority reptiles, is an ectotherm meaning that it has to rely on its environment to regulate body temperature and as a result will spend considerable time basking to absorb heat. Known to be especially fond of low vegetation and ground debris such as fallen logs and branches, it occupies short burrows often concealed at the base of shrubs such as saltbush. Unlike the majority of other agamids which like to perch in elevated places, this species prefers to rest on low branches, from which it will forage over the surrounding open areas and ground litter. When disturbed or alarmed it will quickly retreat to the safety of the nearby burrow.

Painted dragons possess many of the traits common to the family Agamidae. They are very alert lizards with an upright stance and acute vision which they will use to search for prey and keep an eye out for mates, rivals, and predators. Most of their communication is visually oriented with stylised head bops and dips, arm waving, and tail lashing playing a big part. When looking for food, agamids will seize their prey with the use of a short, thick tongue rather than their jaws.

== Diet ==
Employing a sit-and-wait hunting technique, painted dragons will use their keen vision to detect most of their prey by the telltale movement they make. Accordingly, their diets consist largely of surface-active, mobile prey resulting in them consuming a range of arthropods. A strange feature of the family Agamidae is that ants, which are often avoided by other lizards, feature prominently in the diets of many of its species. While it is believed that this is more of a reflection on availability than preference, it still remains to be explained why they take ants at all when so many other lizards actively avoid them due to the formic acid they contain. It is presumed that they have developed some sort of mechanism to deal with the ingestion of this chemical.

While this species is known to be predominantly insectivorous, specimens kept in captivity have been observed supplementing their diet with considerable amounts of plant matter.

== Colour polymorphism ==
Colouration in male painted dragon populations is extremely variable, ranging from reddish brown to orange to yellowish brown, with orange being the least common. In studies of colour polymorphism, individual lizards have been categorised by their predominant colour into three discrete groups: red, orange and yellow

Higher sexual selection is correlated with the variable appearance of males. Between yellow and red coloured male lizards, female lizards sexually select for red-coloured males. The red colouration may indicate indirect benefits to the females, showing that the male has beneficial genes. These include having high testosterone levels, which in turn affects the ability to fight off predators and an aptitude to defend his territory and offspring.

Red males have higher testosterone levels than their yellow male counterparts. Testosterone is linked to aggression; increased aggression seen from a rapid increase in testosterone levels in red lizards gives them a fighting advantage in physical competition with predators. They also show more aggressive strategies in out-competing their yellow counterparts for more mating opportunities. In addition, red males defend their territory more fiercely and begin this behaviour earlier in the year, gaining a behavioural dominance over yellow males. However, the increased aggression and early defence of territory that red lizards express has a significant metabolic expense, which decreases overall fitness.

On the other hand, yellow males show high survival rates, potentially due to relatively lower energy costs in territorial defence. Furthermore, yellow males show higher sperm counts than the red lizards. Yellow males generally have larger-sized testes than red males, and they copulate for shorter periods of time. When the yellow males mate, they have, on average, three times as many offspring as their red counterparts. This dually high survivability among both red and yellow males may be why both colour morphs are maintained in painted dragon populations.

While sexual selection generally favours red males, natural selection maintains variation by selecting for more energetically efficient yellow males. Both colour traits have an evolutionary advantage, which explains the maintenance of this polymorphism in nature.

=== Breeding colouration and oxidative stress ===
The breeding colouration of male C. pictus is brightly conspicuous, but declines with aging. Experiments involving administration of antioxidants to C. pictus males led to the conclusion that breeding colouration is a reflection of innate anti-oxidation capacity that protects against oxidative damage, including oxidative DNA damage. Thus male breeding colouration likely acts as an indicator to females of the underlying level of oxidative stress induced damage in potential mates.
