= Aprasia aurita =

Mallee worm-lizard

Conservation status
- Near Threatened (IUCN 3.1)

Scientific classification
- Kingdom: Animalia
- Phylum: Chordata
- Class: Reptilia
- Order: Squamata
- Suborder: Gekkota
- Family: Pygopodidae
- Genus: Aprasia
- Species: A. aurita

Binomial name
- Aprasia aurita Kluge, 1974

Species of lizard

Aprasia aurita, also called the mallee worm-lizard or eared worm-lizard, is a species of lizard in the Pygopodidae family endemic to Australia; and listed on Schedule 1 under the Commonwealth's Endangered Species Protection Act. It is also listed as "threatened" on Schedule 2 under the Victorian Flora and Fauna Guarantee Act.

A. aurita was formerly found in the Woomelang and Ouyen areas of north-western Victoria. Due to human land use, it is now mostly found in 400 ha (990 acres) of Wathe State Wildlife Reserve, north-western Victoria. It has also been found in Cobbler Creek Recreation Park in South Australia and Mambray Creek Reserve.

It inhabits tall shrubland and open heath, primarily mallee and other vegetation that has not been burnt for at least 40 years. It shelters under rotting logs, leaf litter and mallee root.
