= Northern Plains Grassland =

Ecological community in northern Victoria

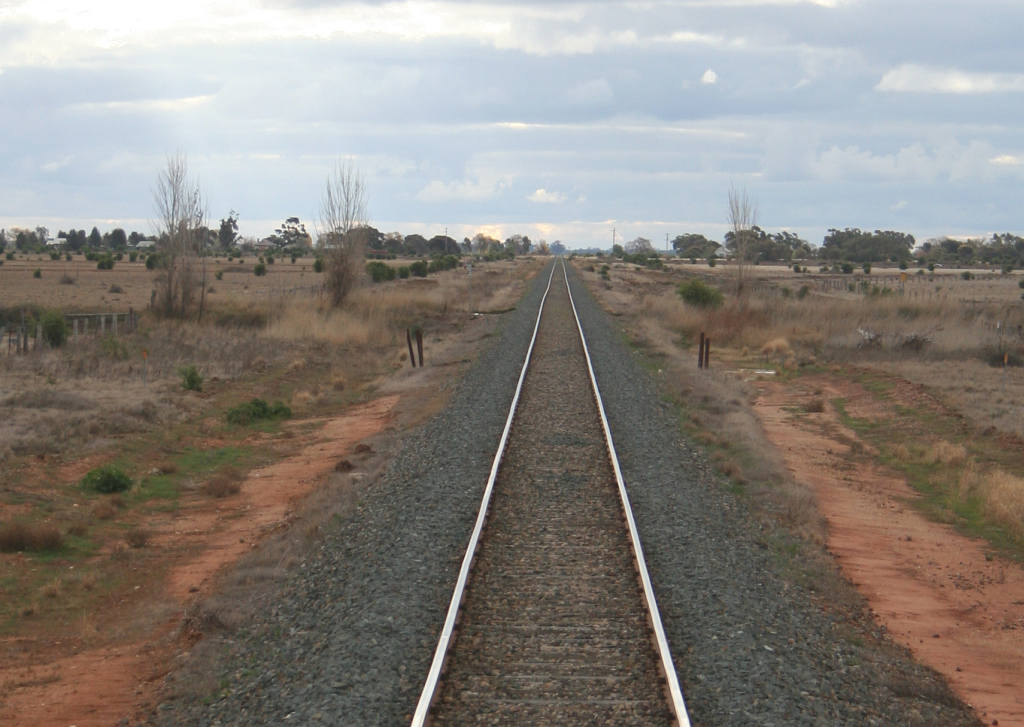

Ecology
- Realm: Australasia
- Biome: Temperate grasslands, savannas, and shrublands
- Borders: Victorian Volcanic Plain grasslands; Southern Tablelands Temperate Grassland; Southeast Australia temperate savanna

Geography
- Area: 100 km^{2} (39 sq mi)
- Country: Australia
- Elevation: 10–50 metres (33–164 ft)
- Coordinates: 36°24′0″S 144°55′0″E
- Climate type: Semi-arid climate (BWk)
- Soil types: Loams to clay-loams

The Northern Plains Grassland (NPGL) is an open, shrubby temperate grassland community located in northern Victoria straddling the Murray Darling Depression and Wimmera, extending to the Riverina and South Western Slopes regions in southern New South Wales. Floristically rich, the area features 30 native plant species per 100 m2.

The community is listed as threatened under Victoria’s Flora and Fauna Guarantee (FFG) Act 1998. Three vegetation communities exist within: Plains Grassland, Chenopod Grassland and Plains Savannah.

== Geography ==
The grassland was formerly well-distributed across the plane to undulating plains of the North Central region crossing into New South Wales at Moama, whilst covering Swan Hill, Mitiamo, Kerang and Cohuna, with some occurrence in the Goulburn Valley near Echuca, Tongala, Kyabram, Numurkah and Corop over the Loddon River at Serpentine. Currently, its distribution is restricted and it mostly occurs as minor residue on roadsides, railway lines and general areas of public land and on private property. NPGL is found on alluvial deposits, in environments that are irregularly flooded. Soils are generally loams to grey and red clay loams in wetter sites, which are usually poorly drained. Rainfall ranges from 375–460 mm in the west to 550mm in the east of the zone.

Before European settlement, the grassland extended across 730,000ha. Though within the last 170 years, extensive irrigation, agriculture and domestic stock grazing have destroyed an estimated 99.75% of the habitat. 7% of the grassland remains in Victoria and 24% in New South Wales. Terrick Terrick National Park is situated in the grassland.

== Ecology ==
A virtually treeless plain, the grasslands feature shrubby, saltbush (Chenopod) species, including members of the Maireana and Einadia genus, in addition to a heavily tussock grass formation. The critically endangered Swainsona plagiotropis and Swainsona murrayana occur in the plains.

Commonly occurring species include Austrodanthonia setacea, Austrostipa scabra, Enteropogon acicularis, Chloris truncata, Whalleya proluta, Swainsona spp, Ptilotus, Goodenia pusilliflora, Levenhookia dubia, Isoetopsis graminifolia, Sporobolus caroli, Nitraria billardierei, Triptilodiscus pygmaeus, Bulbine bulbosa, Chrysocephalum apiculatum, Calocephalus sonderi, Ptilotus exaltatus, Atriplex semibaccata, Brachyscome spp, Vittadinia spp, Leptorhynchos spp, Calocephalus spp, Einadia spp, Eryngium ovinum and Maireana spp.

=== Fauna ===
Animals include Pedionomus torquatus, Synemon spp, Sminthopsis crassicaudata, Pygopus schraderi, Anthus novaeseelandiae, Cincloramphus cruralis, Coturnix ypsilophora, Cincloramphus mathewsi, Coturnix pectoralis, Turnix velox and Pygopus nigriceps.
