= Queanbeyan Nature Reserve =

Nature reserve of New South Wales, Australia

- IUCN category IV (habitat/species management area)
- Location within New South Wales
- Location: New South Wales
- Nearest city: Queanbeyan
- Coordinates: 35°40′54″S 149°11′04″E
- Area: 0.67 km^{2} (0.26 sq mi)
- Established: March 1989
- Governing body: NSW National Parks & Wildlife Service
- Website: Official website

The Queanbeyan Nature Reserve is a protected nature reserve in the Southern Tablelands region of New South Wales, in eastern Australia. The 67-hectare (170-acre) reserve is situated approximately 4 kilometres (2.5 mi) west-south-west of the City of Queanbeyan.

The low, undulating terrain of the reserve supports remnants of two threatened ecological communities – Natural Temperate Grassland and grassy Box-Gum Woodland. A population of the threatened species Button wrinklewort Rutidosis leptorrhynchoides is present within the reserve, and the threatened species Golden Sun Moth Synemon plana has also been recorded.

The reserve is managed by the NSW National Parks & Wildlife Service.

== History ==
The Queanbeyan area is part of the traditional lands of the Ngunawal people. European settlement in the Queanbeyan area commenced in the 1820s and the township developed on the Queanbeyan River, about 3 kilometres (1.9 mi) from the current Queanbeyan Nature Reserve. The land now protected by the reserve was largely used for grazing sheep and cattle. Evidence of early settlement include a windbreak of large pines on the western boundary, dating to the early 1900s, and the site of a former dwelling and garden near the eastern boundary.

== Park establishment ==
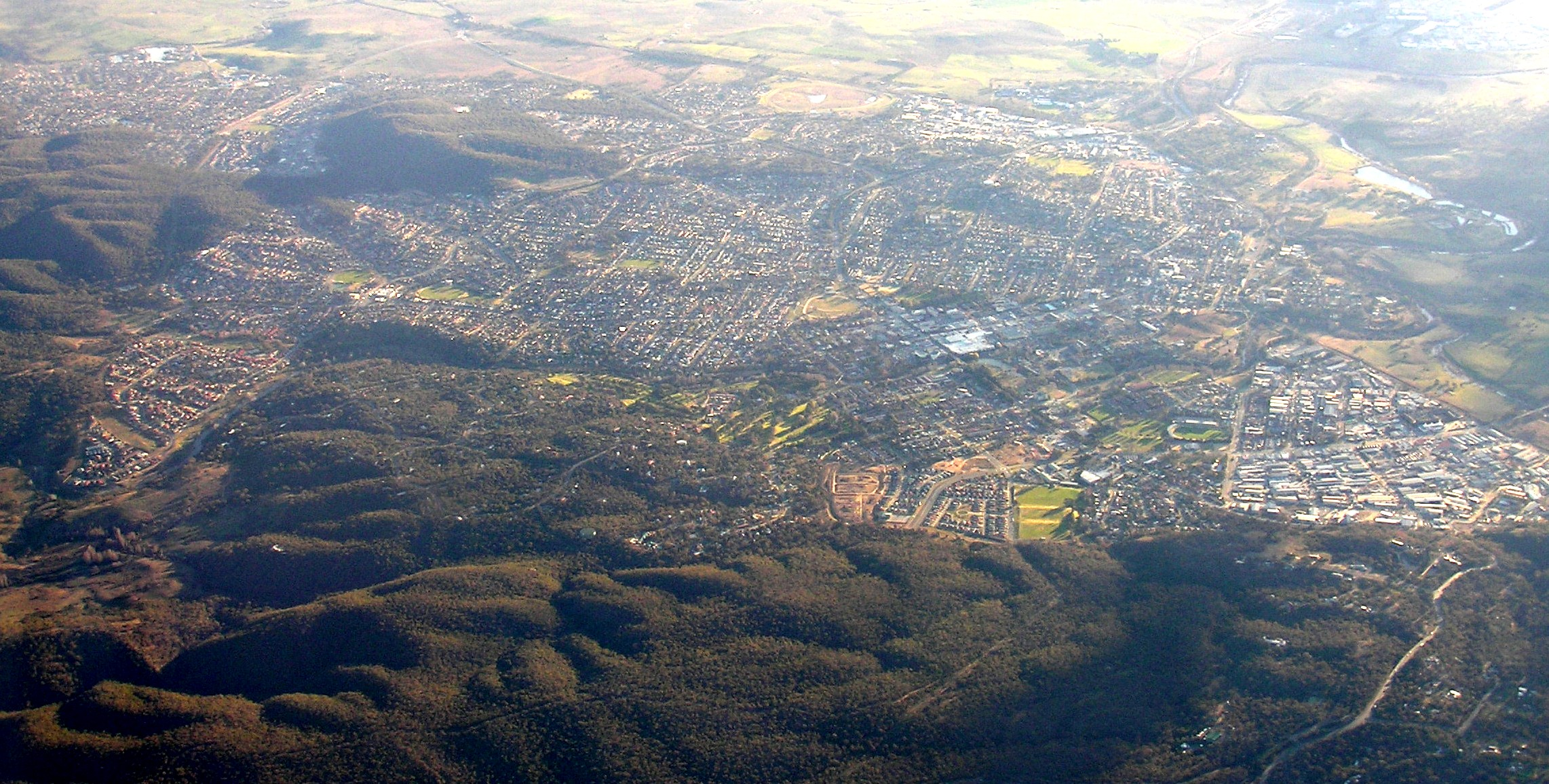
The Queanbeyan Nature Reserve can be seen here at the top of the image

The present northern section was dedicated as Queanbeyan Nature Reserve in March 1989, having been previously managed by Queanbeyan City Council as a Crown Reserve for Municipal Purposes which included the Queanbeyan rubbish tip. This section of the reserve is bordered by the Queanbeyan-Michelago tourist railway, horse paddocks, a residential area, and a former rubbish tip site. In 2004 The NSW Government gazetted a larger area of circa 64 hectares (160 acres) southern addition to the reserve – separate to and 0.275 metres (10.8 in) south of the existing northern section. This newer area, previously managed by the NSW Department of Housing, is bound by Lanyon Drive to the east, Hoover Road to the north and the Queanbeyan-Michelago tourist railway line to the west.

== Biology and ecology ==
=== Ecological communities ===
==== Natural Temperate Grasslands ====
The Queanbeyan Nature Reserve protects remnant Natural Temperate Grassland, a community confined to the Southern Tablelands of NSW, within a region bounded by the Australian Capital Territory (ACT), Yass, Boorowa, the Abercrombie River, Goulburn, the Great Eastern Escarpment, the Victorian border and the eastern boundary of Kosciuszko National Park. In an intact state Natural Temperate Grassland is a generally treeless community dominated by a range of perennial grass species and a diversity of herbaceous species. The community occurs at altitudes between 560 and 1,200 metres (1,840 and 3,940 ft) in valleys influenced by cold air drainage and in broad plains.

Since European settlement in the 1830s the distribution and condition of Natural Temperate Grassland has declined, initially due to extensive use for pastoral and agricultural activities and more recently as a result of a wide range of disturbances including grazing, application of fertilisers, introduction of exotic weed species, changed burning patterns, soil disturbance, changed drainage patterns, clearing for agriculture, plantation forestry, urban infrastructure and rural residential development. As a consequence, in 2000 Natural Temperate Grassland of the Southern Tablelands of NSW and the Australian Capital Territory was listed as Endangered under the Commonwealth Environment Protection and Biodiversity Conservation Act 1999. Throughout its range, only 3% of the Natural Temperate Grassland remains in high ecological integrity, relative to its pre-European settlement extent.

Natural Temperate Grassland at Queanbeyan Nature Reserve occupies most of the larger, southern section but in the smaller, northern section occurs only as small patches. The remnant community at Queanbeyan Nature Reserve has been classified as Wallaby-grass – Tall Speargrass – Common Everlastings Tussock Grassland of the South Eastern Highlands bioregion. The community includes grass species such as Wallaby Grasses Austrodanthonia spp., Red Grass Bothriochloa macra, Tall Speargrass Austrostipa bigeniculata, kangaroo grass Themeda australis, and Poa Tussock Poa labillardierei, and herbaceous species such as Hoary Sunray Leucochrysum albicans var. tricolor, Blue Devil Eryngium ovinum, Leafy Daisy Brachycome rigidula, Tufted Bluebell Wahlenbergia communis, and Lemon Beautyheads Calocephalus citreus.

Among weeds recorded are St John's Wort Hypericum perforatum, Serrated Tussock Nassella trichotoma, African Lovegrass Eragrostis curvula, Phalaris Phalaris aquatica, Cocksfoot Dactylis glomerata, Sweet Briar Rosa rubiginosa, Tree Lucerne Tagastaste sp., Paterson's curse Echium plantagineum, Monterey Pine Pinus radiata and a variety of thistles.

=== Box-Gum Woodland ===
The Queanbeyan Nature Reserve protects remnant White Box Yellow Box Blakely's Red Gum Woodland, which is commonly referred to as Box-Gum Woodland. The distribution of this community within NSW is from the Queensland border to the Victorian border, occurring in the tablelands and western slopes. In an intact state, Box-Gum Woodland is characterised by the presence of White Box Eucalyptus albens, Yellow Box E. melliodora and / or Blakely's Red Gum E. blakelyi occurring with a range of other species. The groundcover is characterised by native grasses and a high diversity of herbs, while understorey shrubs are generally sparse or absent, though they may be locally common.

Since European settlement, Box-Gum Woodland has been drastically reduced in area and highly fragmented because of clearance for cropping and pasture improvement (NSW Scientific Committee, 2002) and the community had been reduced to less than 1% of its original extent. As a consequence, in 2002 White Box Yellow Box Blakely's Red Gum Woodland was listed as Endangered under the NSW Threatened Species Conservation Act 1995. In 2009 the community was listed as Critically Endangered under the Commonwealth Environment Protection and Biodiversity Conservation Act 1999.

Remnant Box-Gum Woodland at Queanbeyan Nature Reserve occupies most of the smaller, northern section but occurs only as small, isolated patches in the larger, southern section. The overstorey includes Yellow Box, Blakely's Red Gum and Apple Box Eucalyptus bridgesiana. The shrubby understorey includes Early Wattle Acacia genistifolia, Hickory Wattle A. implexa, Green Wattle A. mearnsii and Golden Wattle A. pycnantha, and a number of other large shrubs such as Sweet Bursaria Bursaria spinosa subsp. lasiophylla, Burgan Kunzea ericoides and Violet Kunzea Kunzea parvifolia. Smaller shrubs include Native Cranberry Astroloma humifusum, Daphne Heath Brachyloma daphnoides, Peach Heath Lissanthe strigosa and Urn Heath Melichrus urceolatus. The grassy groundcover is fairly open, with many native grasses and forbs. Several species of lilies, daisies and legumes are present along with at least fifteen species of native grasses including Austrodanthonia spp., Austrostipa spp., Red Grass Bothriochloa macra, Tussock Grass Poa sieberiana and kangaroo grass Themeda australis.

Significant weeds recorded include St John's Wort Hypericum perforatum, Serrated Tussock Nassella trichotoma, African Lovegrass Eragrostis curvula and Phalaris Phalaris aquatica.

== Flora ==
=== Button wrinklewort ===
In 1999 it was reported that Queanbeyan Nature Reserve protected some 10,000 specimens of Button wrinklewort. however the present number is likely to be closer to 27,000. Button wrinklewort is a multi-stemmed perennial forb which produces multiple flowering stems 15 to 30 centimetres (5.9 to 11.8 in) high during spring and summer. Each flower-head is on an individual short stalk and consists of numerous very small clustered yellow flowers. Populations of Button wrinklewort occur in south-east NSW and on the plains west of Melbourne. In the Southern Tablelands of NSW, populations of Button wrinklewort occur in Goulburn, the Canberra – Queanbeyan area and at Michelago. Evidence suggests that the species was formerly widespread within this range.

Button wrinklewort usually inhabits Natural Temperate Grassland, Box-Gum Woodland and the ecotone between these two communities. Since European settlement habitat for the species has been lost, degraded or fragmented as a result of activities such as grazing, cropping, residential and other developments, invasion by weeds and changes to natural fire regimes. Only 18 extant natural populations are known in NSW, and five populations are likely to have become extinct since they were first recorded. Remnant populations are now usually restricted to roadsides, travelling stock reserves, cemeteries railway easements and the occasional private landholding. Within NSW, natural populations of Button wrinklewort are formally conserved within Queanbeyan Nature Reserve, Crace Grassland Reserve (part of the Canberra Nature Park) and the Red Hill Section of Canberra Nature Park.

As a consequence, Button wrinklewort is listed as endangered under the Threatened Species Conservation Act 1995 (NSW) and as endangered under the Environment Protection and Biodiversity Conservation Act 1999 (Cth).

== Fauna ==
=== Golden Sun Moth ===
The Golden Sun Moth Synemon plana is a medium-sized, diurnal moth with a wingspan of between 31 millimetres (1.2 in) for females and 34 millimetres (1.3 in) for males. Populations of Golden Sun Moth in NSW are located in the area between Queanbeyan, Gunning, Young and Tumut. Historically the moth's distribution extended from Bathurst in central NSW through the NSW Southern Tablelands, through to central and western Victoria, to Bordertown in eastern South Australia.

Golden Sun Moth occurs in Natural Temperate Grasslands and grassy Box-Gum Woodlands, where the groundcover is dominated by Wallaby Grasses Austrodanthonia spp. The bare ground in inter-tussock spaces is considered to be an important micro-habitat for the species.

Larvae feed exclusively on the roots of wallaby grasses and adult Golden Sun Moths, which do not feed, live for only one to for days. The flight period usually lasts from six to eight weeks during November and December in the Queanbeyan region, and adult moths emerge continuously throughout this period. Males Golden Sun Moths fly only in bright sunshine during the warmest part of the day

Female Golden Sun Moth have reduced hind wings and rarely fly, though males are capable of active and prolonged flight. Male Golden Sun Moths will not fly greater than 100m away from areas of suitable habitat, therefore populations separated by more than 200m can be considered effectively isolated. Golden Sun Moth populations which have gone extinct, or vacant patches of suitable habitat, are highly unlikely to be recolonised. The loss and degradation of Natural Temperate Grassland and Box-Gum Woodland (as described above) throughout the original range of Golden Sun Moth has resulted in a significant reduction of suitable habitat. As a consequence, Golden Sun Moth is listed as Endangered under the Threatened Species Conservation Act 1995 (NSW) and as Critically Endangered under the Environment Protection and Biodiversity Conservation Act 1999 (Cth).

== See also ==
- Protected areas of New South Wales
