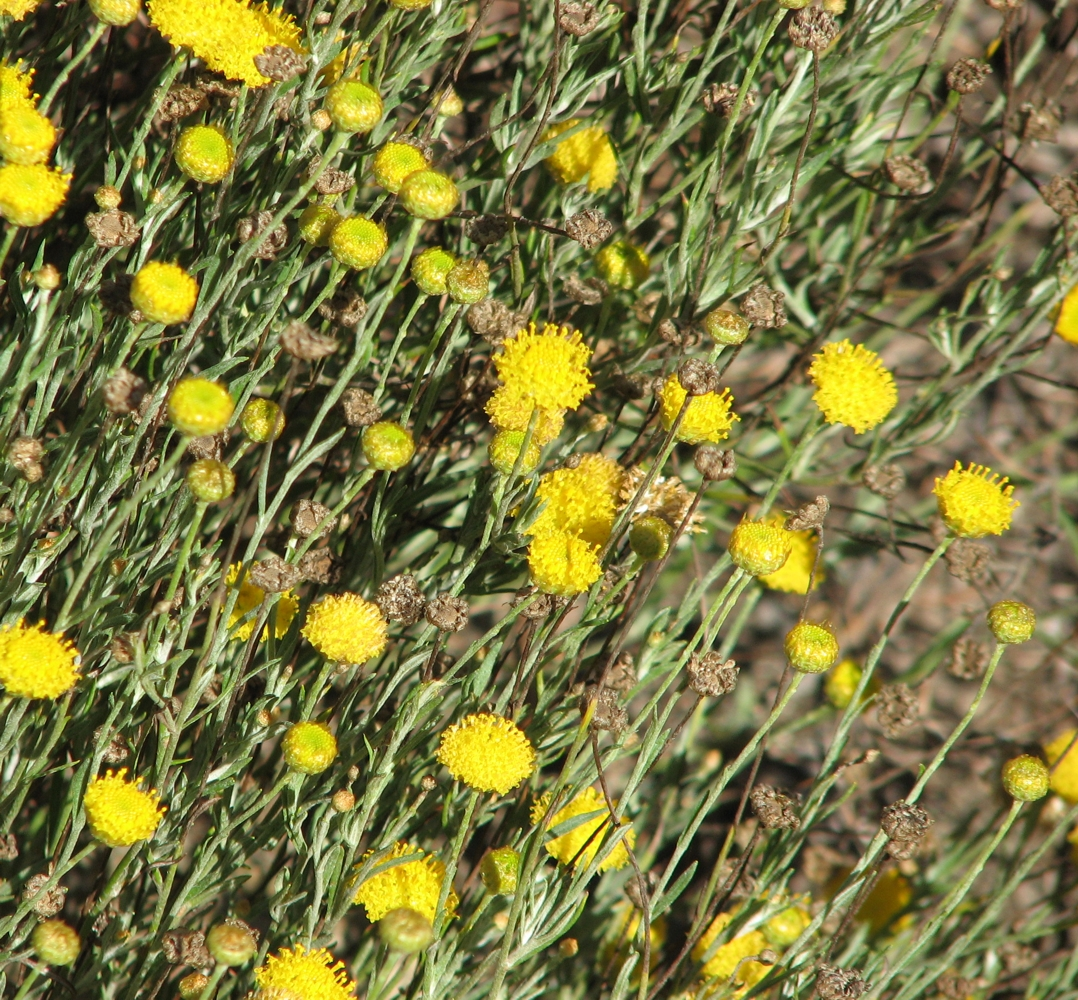
- Rutidosis helichrysoides

Scientific classification
- Kingdom: Plantae
- Clade: Tracheophytes
- Clade: Angiosperms
- Clade: Eudicots
- Clade: Asterids
- Order: Asterales
- Family: Asteraceae
- Subfamily: Asteroideae
- Tribe: Gnaphalieae
- Genus: Rutidosis; DC.

Synonyms
- Helichrysum sect. Rutidosis (DC.) Baill.; Actinopappus Hook.f. ex A.Gray

= Rutidosis =

Genus of plants

Rutidosis is a genus of Australian annual and perennial herbs in the tribe Gnaphalieae within the family Asteraceae.

Species

- Rutidosis acutiglumis Philipson
- Rutidosis crispata A.E.Holland
- Rutidosis glandulosa A.E.Holland
- Rutidosis helichrysoides DC. – grey wrinklewort
- Rutidosis heterogama Philipson
- Rutidosis lanata A.E.Holland
- Rutidosis leiolepis F.Muell.
- Rutidosis leptorrhynchoides F.Muell. – button wrinklewort
- Rutidosis leucantha F.Muell.
- Rutidosis macra F.Muell.
- Rutidosis multiflora (Nees) B.L.Rob.
- Rutidosis murchisonii F.Muell.
- Rutidosis panniculata E.Pritz.

formerly included

see Phacellothrix Podolepis Siloxerus

- Rutidosis arachnoidea Hook. - Podolepis arachnoidea (Hook.) Druce
- Rutidosis brownii Benth. - Phacellothrix cladochaeta (F.Muell.) F.Muell.
- Rutidosis multiflora (Nees) B.L.Rob. - Siloxerus multiflorus (Nees) Nees
- Rutidosis pumilo Benth. - Siloxerus multiflorus (Nees) Nees
