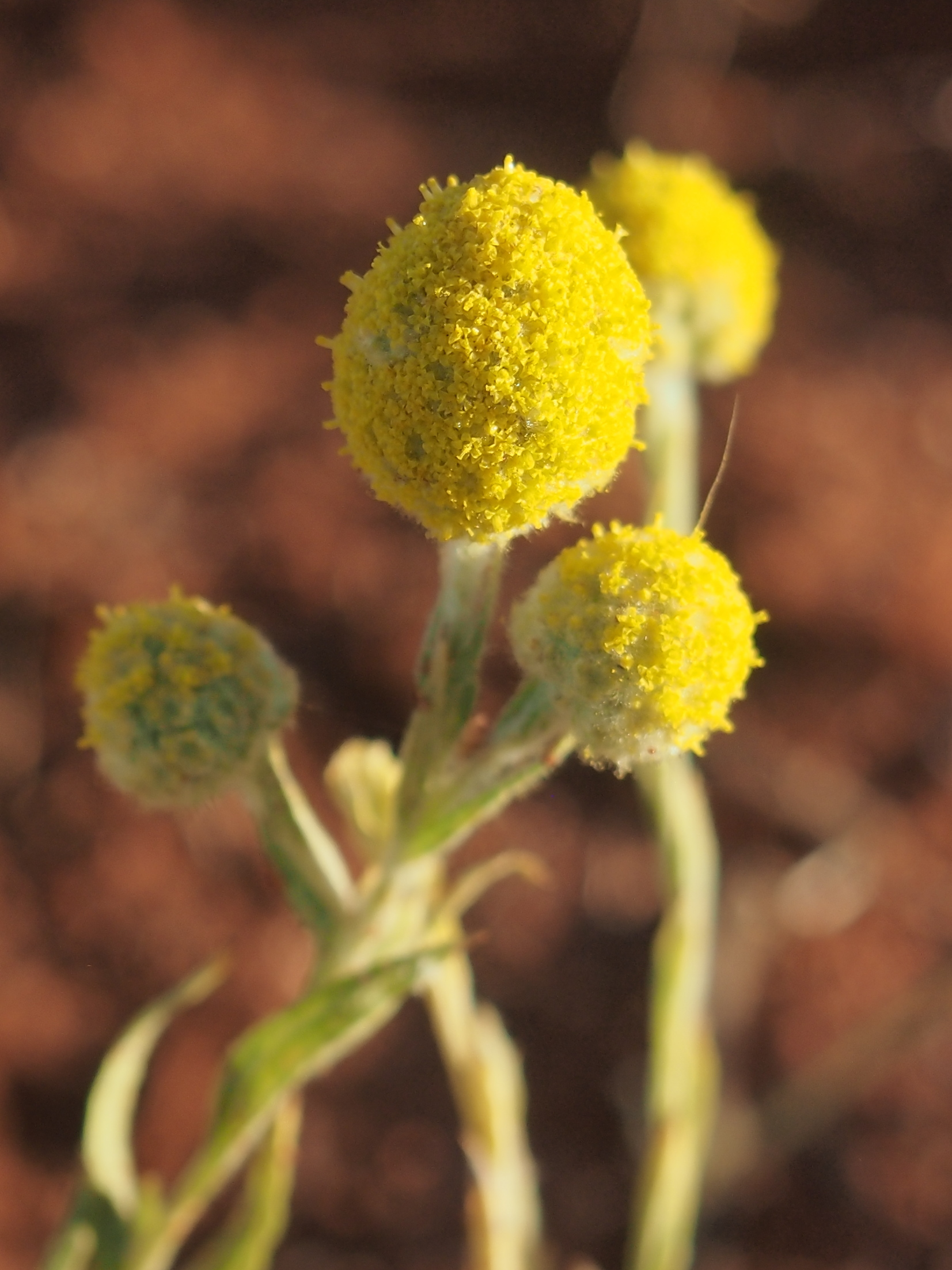

Scientific classification
- Kingdom: Plantae
- Clade: Tracheophytes
- Clade: Angiosperms
- Clade: Eudicots
- Clade: Asterids
- Order: Asterales
- Family: Asteraceae
- Genus: Calocephalus
- Species: C. knappii

Binomial name
- Calocephalus knappii (F.Muell.) Ewart & Jean White

= Calocephalus knappii =

Species of flowering plant

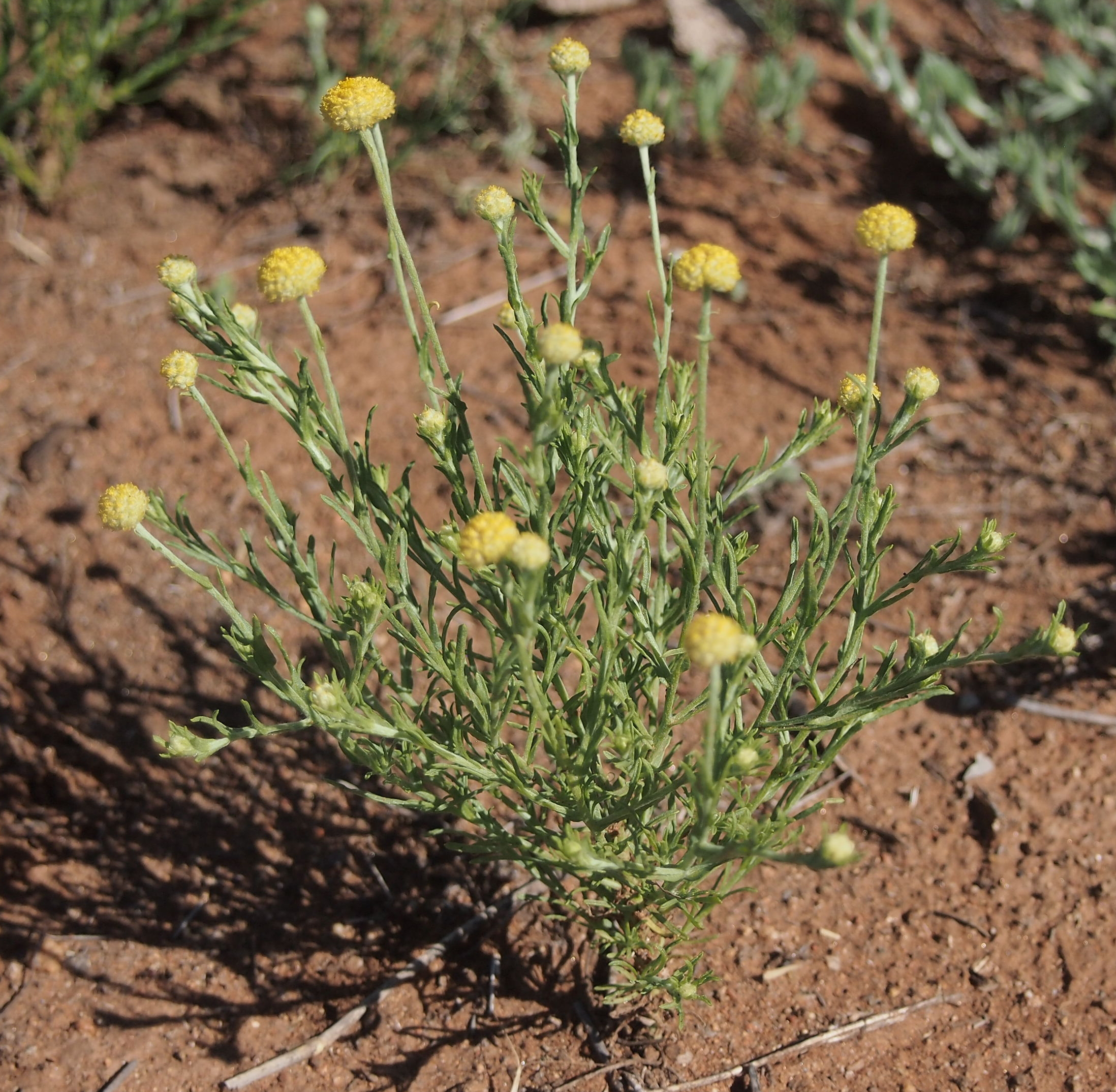
Habit

Calocephalus knappii, is a species of flowering plant in the family Asteraceae. It is a small annual herb with yellow globular-shape flowers upright to decumbent branches and is endemic to Australia.

== Description ==
Calocephalus knappii is an annual herb with decumbent or upright habit with branches about 3–30 cm (1.2–11.8 in) long. The leaves are arranged alternate, oval to lance-shaped or linear to elliptic, 0.5–3.2 cm (0.20–1.26 in) long, spreading to pressed against the stem, 0.25–0.6 cm (0.098–0.236 in) wide, occasional to thickly hairy and a prominent mid vein. The flower heads are oblong, rounded, globular or ovoid, about 0.6–1.6 cm (0.24–0.63 in) in diameter, orange or yellowish brown, each head has about 20-70 florets, outer bracts mostly green, opaque and the corolla tube 1.6–2.4 mm (0.063–0.094 in) long. Flowering occurs from July to October and the fruit is an achene about 0.5 mm (0.020 in) long, about 0.3 mm (0.012 in) in diameter, brown and bristly.

== Taxonomy and naming ==
Calcephalus knappii was first formally described in 1910 by Ewart & Jean White from an unpublished description by Ferdinand von Mueller and the description was published in Proceedings of the Royal Society of Victoria. The specific epithet (knappii) is in honour of Austrian botanist Joseph Armin Knapp.

== Distribution and habitat ==
This species grows in South Australia, Western Australia, Queensland and the Northern Territory on sand, sandy clay and near drainage channels.
