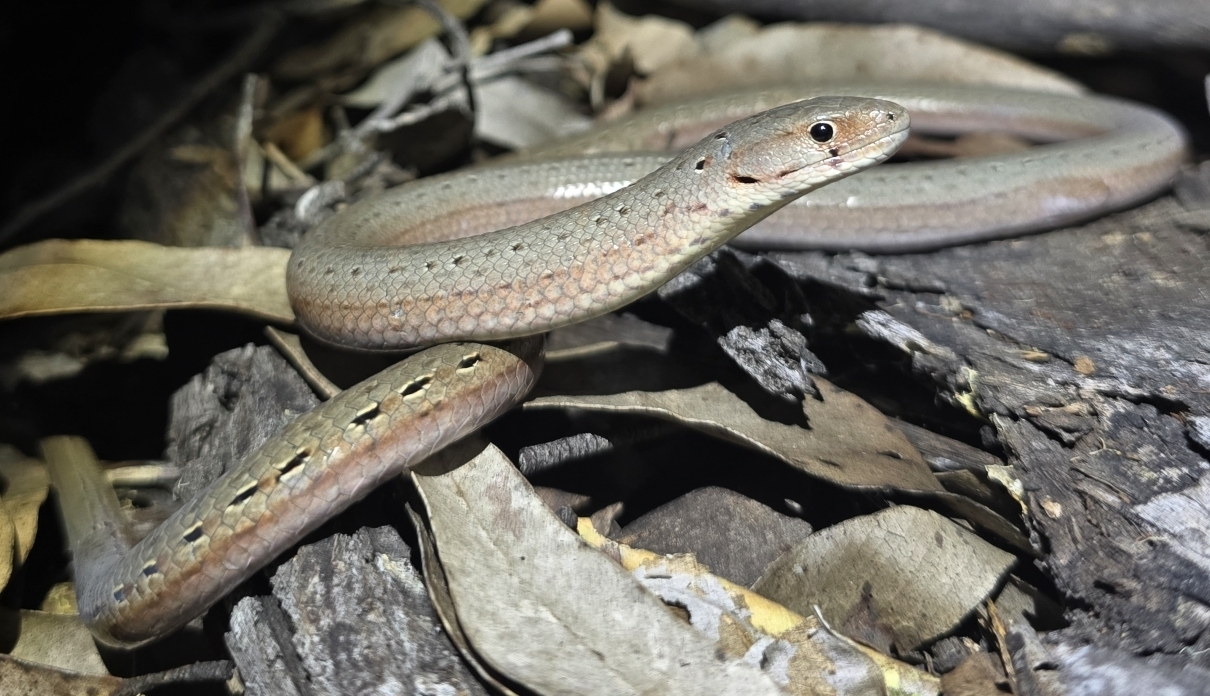
- Common scaly-foot (Pygopus lepidopodus)

Scientific classification
- Kingdom: Animalia
- Phylum: Chordata
- Class: Reptilia
- Order: Squamata
- Suborder: Gekkota
- Family: Pygopodidae
- Genus: Pygopus; Merrem, 1820

Type species
- Anguis lepidopodus Lacépède, 1804
- Geographic range of the genus Pygopus in Australia

= Pygopus =

Genus of lizards

Pygopus is a genus belonging to the family of Australian legless lizards (Pygopodidae). Members of this genus are also commonly called scaly-foot.

== Species ==
Within the genus Pygopus the following five species are recognized as being valid.

- Pygopus lepidopodus (Lacépède, 1804) – common scaly-foot
- Pygopus nigriceps (Fischer, 1882) – hooded scaly-foot, western scaly-foot, black-headed scaly-foot, western hooded scaly-foot
- Pygopus robertsi P. Oliver, Couper & Amey, 2010 – Robert's scaly-foot, Cape York scaly-foot
- Pygopus schraderi Boulenger, 1913 – eastern hooded scaly-foot, eastern scaly-foot
- Pygopus steelescotti James, Donnellan & Hutchinson, 2001 – northern hooded scaly-foot

Nota bene: A binomial authority in parentheses indicates that the species was originally described in a genus other than Pygopus.
