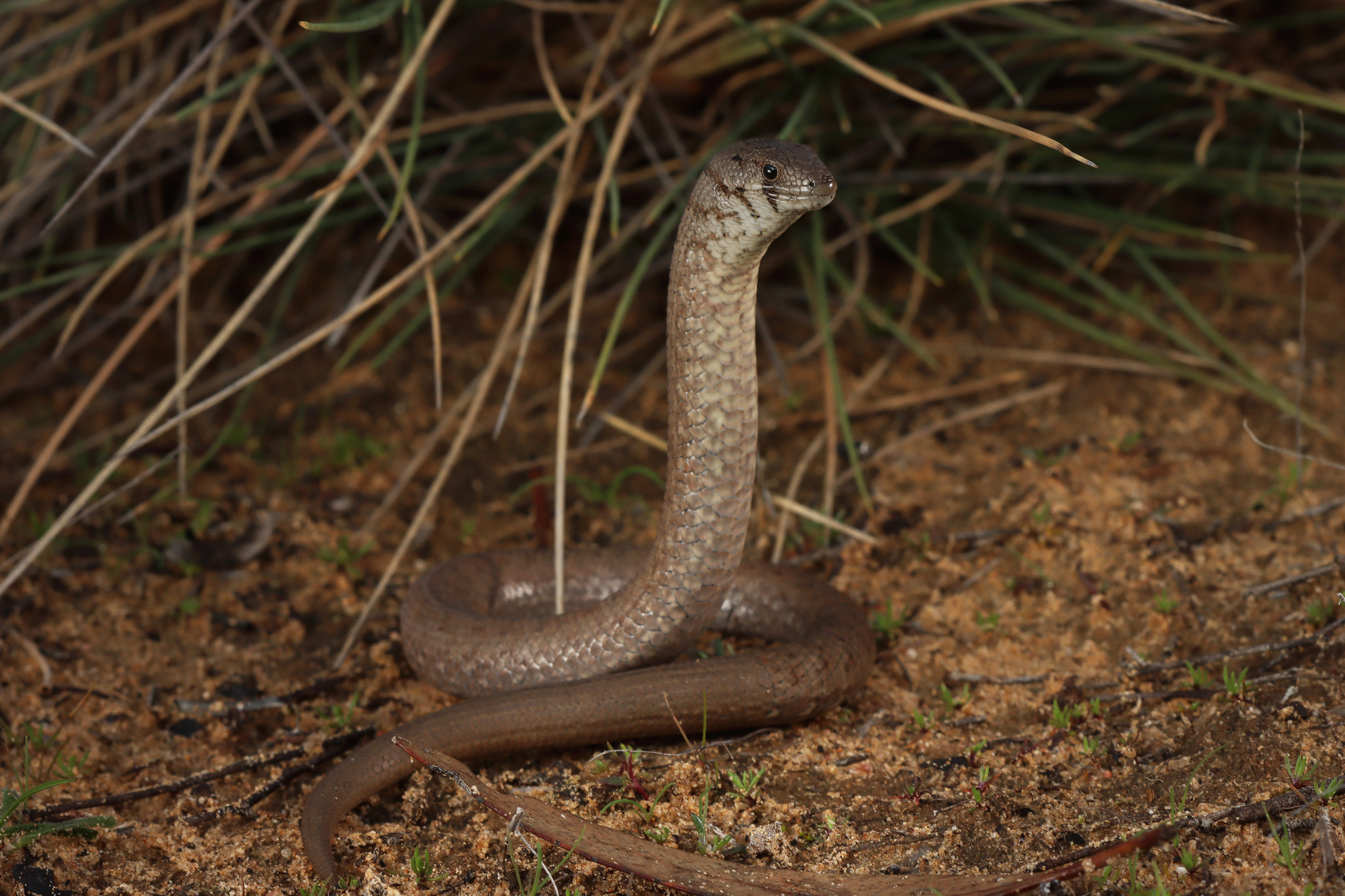

Conservation status
- Least Concern (IUCN 3.1)

Scientific classification
- Kingdom: Animalia
- Phylum: Chordata
- Class: Reptilia
- Order: Squamata
- Suborder: Gekkota
- Family: Pygopodidae
- Genus: Pygopus
- Species: P. lepidopodus

Binomial name
- Pygopus lepidopodus Bernard Germain de Lacépède 1804

= Common scaly-foot =

Species of lizard

The common scaly-foot (Pygopus lepidopodus) is a widespread species of legless lizard in the Pygopodidae family. It is endemic to Australia.

== Behavior ==
Mostly active at dusk or dawn (crepuscular), it can be nocturnal after high daytime temperatures. It lives in long grasses, heaths, and woodlands, and is most often seen on warm mornings, foraging for food. When threatened, the scaly-foot flashes its thick, fleshy tongue, in an apparent mimicry of snakes. Usually two eggs are laid per clutch.

== Diet ==
Its diet includes a variety of invertebrates such as burrowing spiders.

== Distribution ==
It is found mostly in the southern and eastern parts of Australia, though isolated populations occur in semiarid southern Queensland and tropical wet Queensland.

== Description ==
The scaly-foot is snake-like in appearance, up to 80 cm in length with a noticeable "keel" or ridge on the top. Variable in colours and pattern, it occasionally is grey with black spots or sometimes coppery brown with a grey tail. Other patterns and variations occur. Prominent limb flaps may be seen on close inspection, hence the name "scaly-foot".

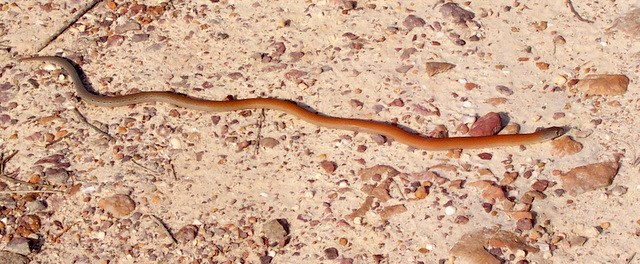
Ku-ring-gai Chase National Park

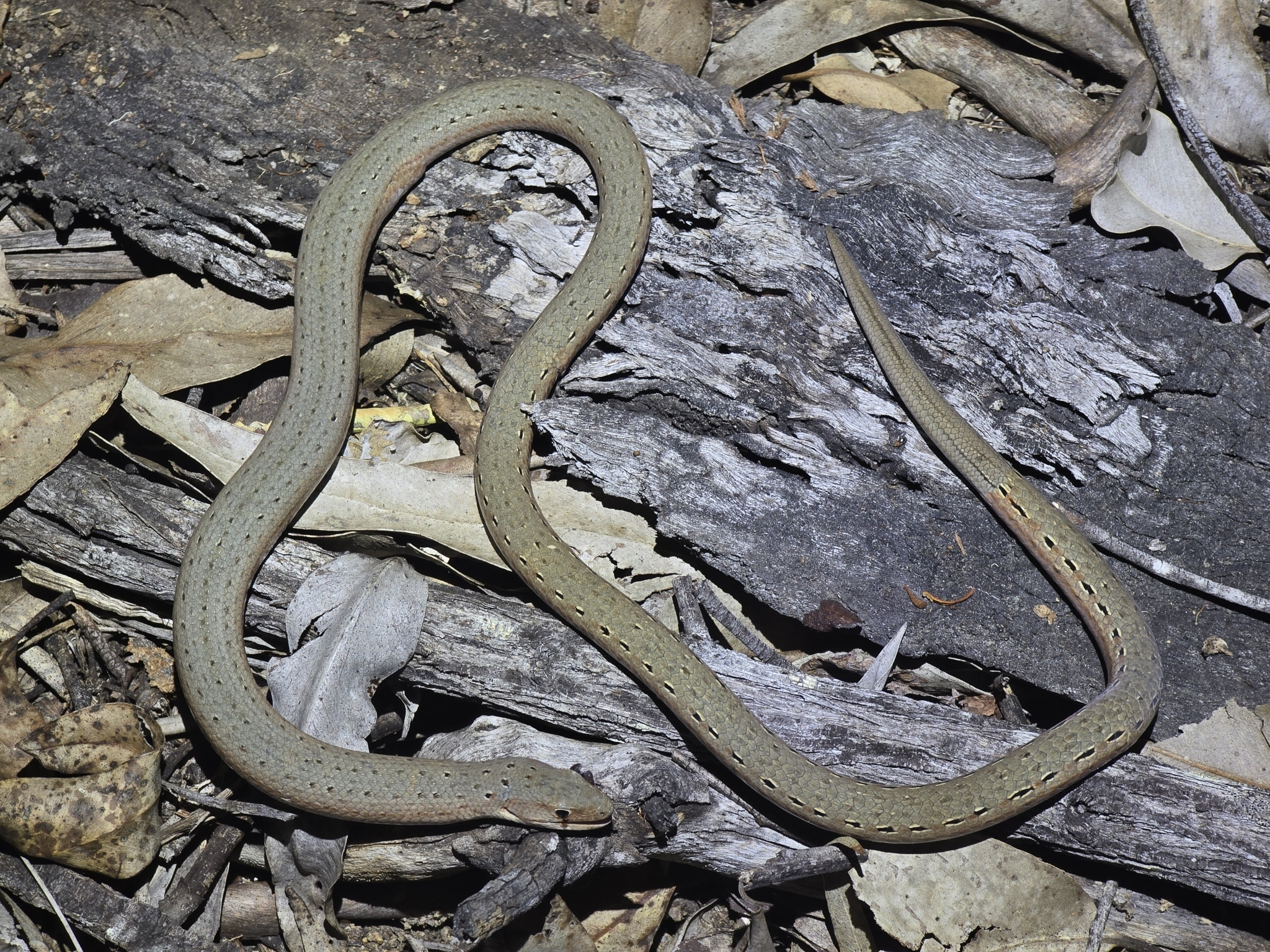
New South Wales

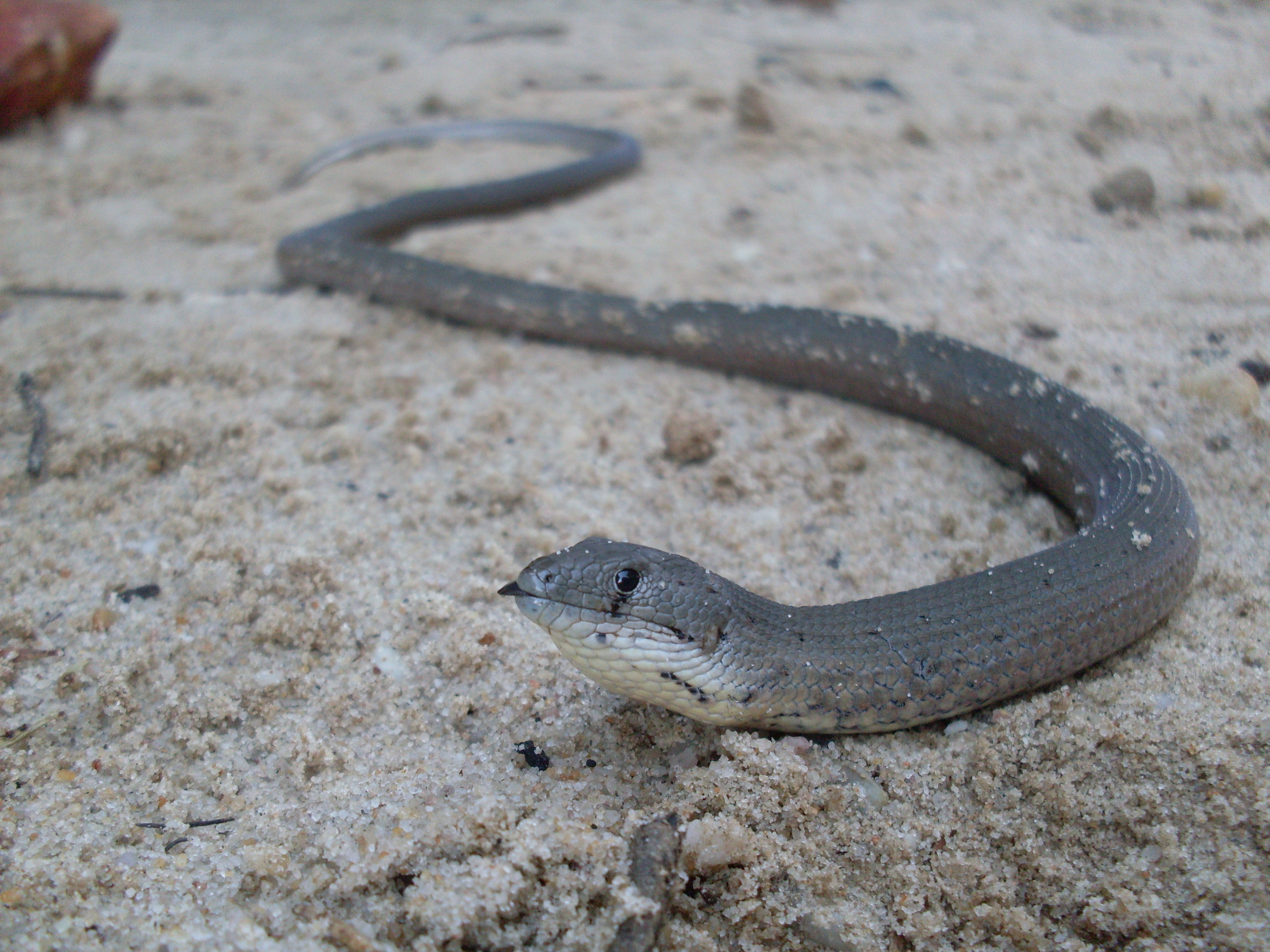
Royal National Park

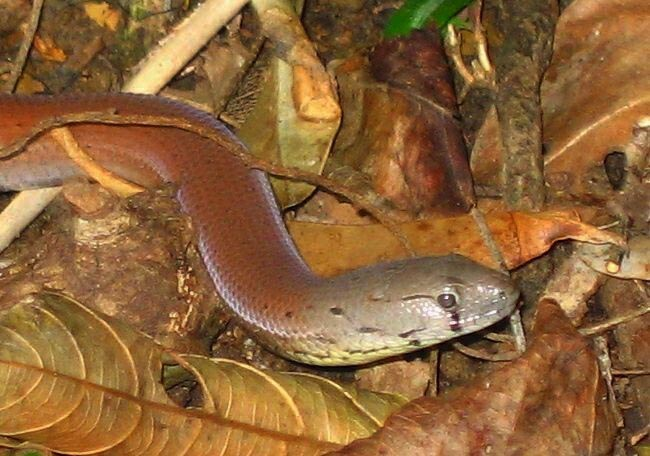

== Captivity ==
Considered an easy to keep species, a license is required to keep the common scaly-foot as a pet in Australia.
