= Calocephalus aervoides =

Scientific classification
- Kingdom: Plantae
- Clade: Tracheophytes
- Clade: Angiosperms
- Clade: Eudicots
- Clade: Asterids
- Order: Asterales
- Family: Asteraceae
- Genus: Calocephalus
- Species: C. aervoides

Binomial name
- Calocephalus aervoides (F.Muell.) Benth.

Synonyms
- Leucophyta aervoides (F.Muell.) Kuntze; Pachysurus aervoides F.Muell.

Species of flowering plant

Calocephalus aervoides is a species of flowering plant in the family Asteraceae, native to Western Australia. Its common name is woolly beauty-heads.

This species is a herb growing up to 15 centimetres tall. It produces yellow flowers in September and October. It grows on plains with loam and sandy soils over limestone substrates.

The species was first formally described by the botanist Ferdinand von Mueller as Pachysurus aervoides in Fragmenta Phytographiae Australiae in 1863.
