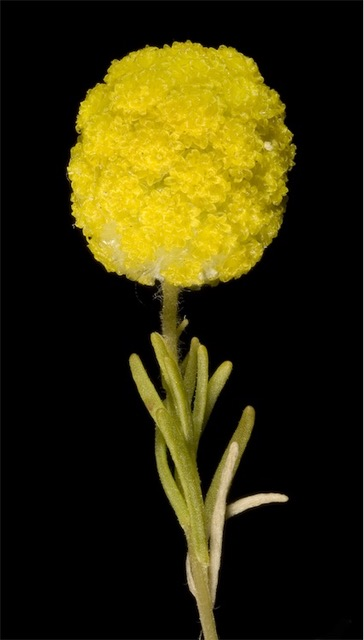

Scientific classification
- Kingdom: Plantae
- Clade: Tracheophytes
- Clade: Angiosperms
- Clade: Eudicots
- Clade: Asterids
- Order: Asterales
- Family: Asteraceae
- Genus: Calocephalus
- Species: C. francisii

Binomial name
- Calocephalus francisii (F.Muell.) Benth.

= Calocephalus francisii =

Fine leaf beauty-heads

Species of flowering plant

Calocephalus francisii, commonly known as fine-leaf beauty-heads, is a species of flowering plant in the family Asteraceae. It is a small annual with yellow globular-shape flowers and is endemic to Western Australia.

== Description ==
Calocephalus francisii is an annual herb with some branches upright to downward, mostly smooth but hairy toward the flower heads. The leaves are arranged alternately, sessile, almost linear, lance-shaped or narrowly elliptic-shaped, 5.25 mm (0.207 in) long, 0.5–3 mm (0.020–0.118 in) wide, occasionally semi-succulent and smooth. The flower heads may vary in shape from globe, narrowly oblong to oval shaped, 5–27 mm (0.20–1.06 in) long and 4–10 mm (0.16–0.39 in) in diameter. The heads consist of 15-60 flowers, yellow or white translucent bracts in rows of 2 or 3, outer 4 or 5 bracts in a single row. The inner 5-9 bracts in one or two rows, corolla has thickened margins, 5 lobes, tube 1.6–2.3 mm (0.063–0.091 in) long and 5 stamens. Flowering occurs from August to October and the fruit is dry, one-seeded, obovoid, 0.28–0.32 mm (0.011–0.013 in) in diameter, pale or pinkish brown.

== Taxonomy and naming ==
This species was first formally described in 1863 by Ferdinand von Mueller who gave it the name Pachysurus francisii in Fragmenta Phytographiae Australiae. In 1867 George Bentham changed the name to Calocephalus francisii and the description was published in Flora Australiensis. The specific epithet (francisii) is in honour of George William Francis.

== Distribution and habitat ==
Fine-leaf beauty-heads grows in sandy situations, outcrops, ridges and salt flats mostly on the west coast of Western Australia.
