= Pygopus robertsi =

Conservation status
- Least Concern (IUCN 3.1)

Scientific classification
- Kingdom: Animalia
- Phylum: Chordata
- Class: Reptilia
- Order: Squamata
- Suborder: Gekkota
- Family: Pygopodidae
- Genus: Pygopus
- Species: P. robertsi

Binomial name
- Pygopus robertsi Oliver, Couper & Amey, 2010

Species of lizard

Pygopus robertsi, also known as Robert's scaly-foot or Cape York scaly-foot, is a species of legless lizard of the Pygopodidae family. It is endemic to Queensland, Australia.

== Etymology ==
The specific name, robertsi, is in honor of Australian Charles George Roberts for assistance to scientists in the field.
