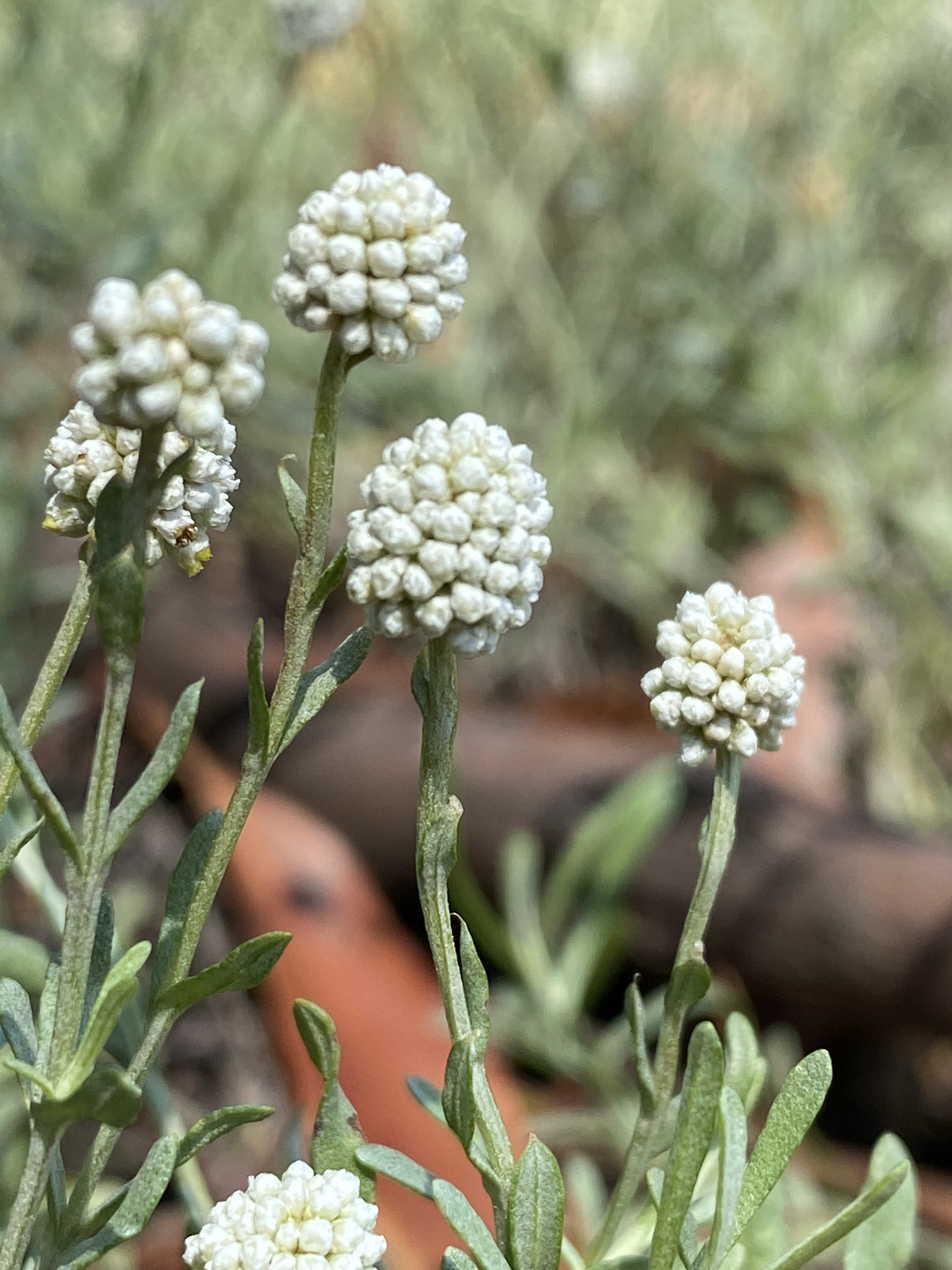

Scientific classification
- Kingdom: Plantae
- Clade: Tracheophytes
- Clade: Angiosperms
- Clade: Eudicots
- Clade: Asterids
- Order: Asterales
- Family: Asteraceae
- Genus: Calocephalus
- Species: C. lacteus

Binomial name
- Calocephalus lacteus Less.

= Calocephalus lacteus =

Species of flowering plant

Calocephalus lacteus, commonly known as milky beauty-heads, is a species of flowering plant in the family Asteraceae. It is an ascending, spreading perennial with silver-grey leaves and cream globular-shaped flower heads. It occurs in eastern Australia.

== Description ==
Calocephalus lacteus is a perennial, ascending, spreading herb by means of rhizomes, 5–70 cm (2.0–27.6 in) high and forms a dense groundcover. The grey-green leaves are arranged opposite lower on the stem, alternate toward the apex, obovate to lance shaped, or almost linear, 1–5 cm (0.39–1.97 in) long, 1–4.5 mm (0.039–0.177 in) wide, short matted hairs, two lateral veins and midrib veins usually prominent. The globular flower is a dense cluster of 20-200 capitula in each compound head 0.6–1.5 cm (0.24–0.59 in) long, each containing 2-3 yellow florets enclosed by 9-16 white bracts that are flat to conduplicate and 1.5–3.3 mm (0.059–0.130 in) long. The fruit is a cypsela with 6-11 bristles and fine hairs in the upper part. Flowering occurs mostly from November to March.

== Taxonomy and naming ==
Calocephalus lacteus was first formally described in 1832 by Christian Friedrich Lessing and the description was published in Synopsis Generum Compositarum. The specific epithet (lacteus) means "milky", referring to the white bracts.

== Distribution and habitat ==
Milky beauty-heads grows in low-lying occasionally wet and grassy situations in New South Wales, Victoria, Tasmania and South Australia.
