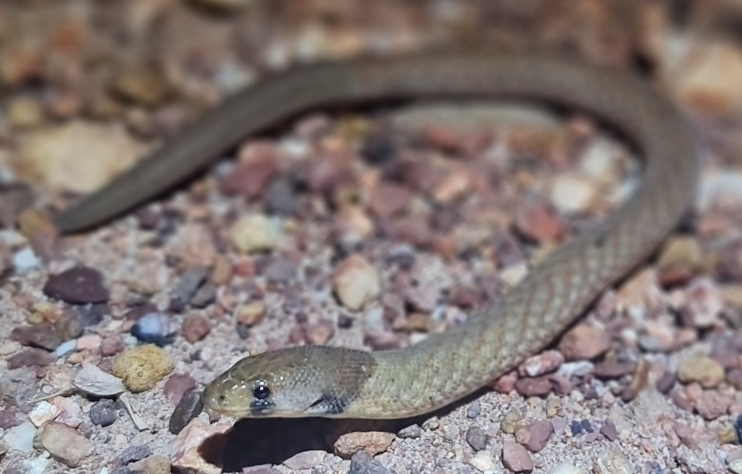

Conservation status
- Least Concern (IUCN 3.1)

Scientific classification
- Kingdom: Animalia
- Phylum: Chordata
- Class: Reptilia
- Order: Squamata
- Suborder: Gekkota
- Family: Pygopodidae
- Genus: Pygopus
- Species: P. steelescotti

Binomial name
- Pygopus steelescotti James, Donnellan & Hutchinson, 2001

= Northern hooded scaly-foot =

Species of lizard

The northern hooded scaly-foot (Pygopus steelescotti) is a species of legless lizard in the family Pygopodidae. The species is native to northern Australia.

== Etymology ==
The specific name, steelescotti, is in honor of Dr. Colin Steele-Scott for his support of the South Australian Museum.

== Geographic range ==
P. steelescotti is found in northeastern Western Australia, northern Northern Territory, and northwestern Queensland, Australia.

== Habitat ==
The preferred natural habitat of P. steelescotti is forest.

== Description ==
Large for its genus, P. steelescotti may attain a snout-to-vent length (SVL) of 18.5 cm (7.3 in). The tail is very long, 100% to 152% of SVL.

== Reproduction ==
P. steelescotti is oviparous.
