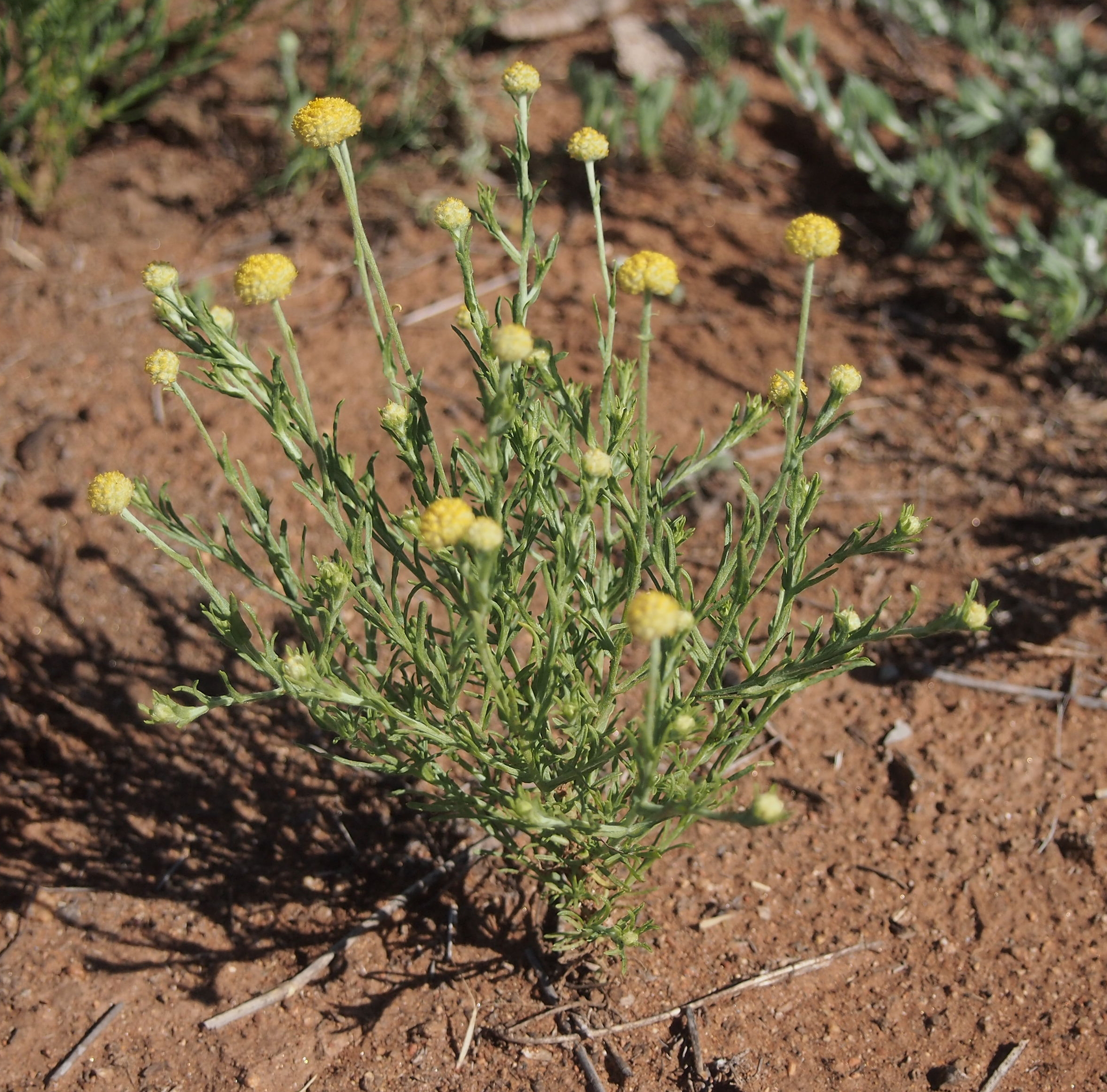

Scientific classification
- Kingdom: Plantae
- Clade: Tracheophytes
- Clade: Angiosperms
- Clade: Eudicots
- Clade: Asterids
- Order: Asterales
- Family: Asteraceae
- Genus: Calocephalus
- Species: C. platycephalus

Binomial name
- Calocephalus platycephalus (F.Muell.) Benth.

= Calocephalus platycephalus =

Yellow top

Species of flowering plant

Calocephalus platycephalus commonly known as western beauty-heads or yellow top, is a species of flowering plant in the family Asteraceae. It is an upright to sprawling herb with white hairy branches and yellow ball-shaped flower heads and is endemic to Australia.

== Description ==
Calocephalus platycephalus is a herb with upright to ascending, whitish woolly to hairy branches and about 6–45 cm (2.4–17.7 in) high. The leaves are arranged alternately, linear to lance-shaped, mostly 5–30 mm (0.20–1.18 in) long, 1–2 mm (0.039–0.079 in) wide, more or less smooth to hairy, apex blunt to occasionally ending in a short triangular point in the upper leaves. The flower heads are yellow, broadly rounded to globe-shaped and 17-22 bracts. Flowering occurs mainly from spring to summer and the fruit is a bristly achene 0.5–0.65 mm (0.020–0.026 in) long.

== Taxonomy and naming ==
This species was described in 1867 by Ferdinand von Mueller who gave it the name Pachysurus platycephalus. In 1867 George Bentham changed the name to Calocephalus platycephalus and the description was published in Flora Australiensis. The specific epithet (platycephalus) means "headed".

== Distribution and habitat ==
Western beauty-heads grows in sandy and sometimes semi-salines locations in New South Wales, South Australia, Western Australia and the Northern Territory.
