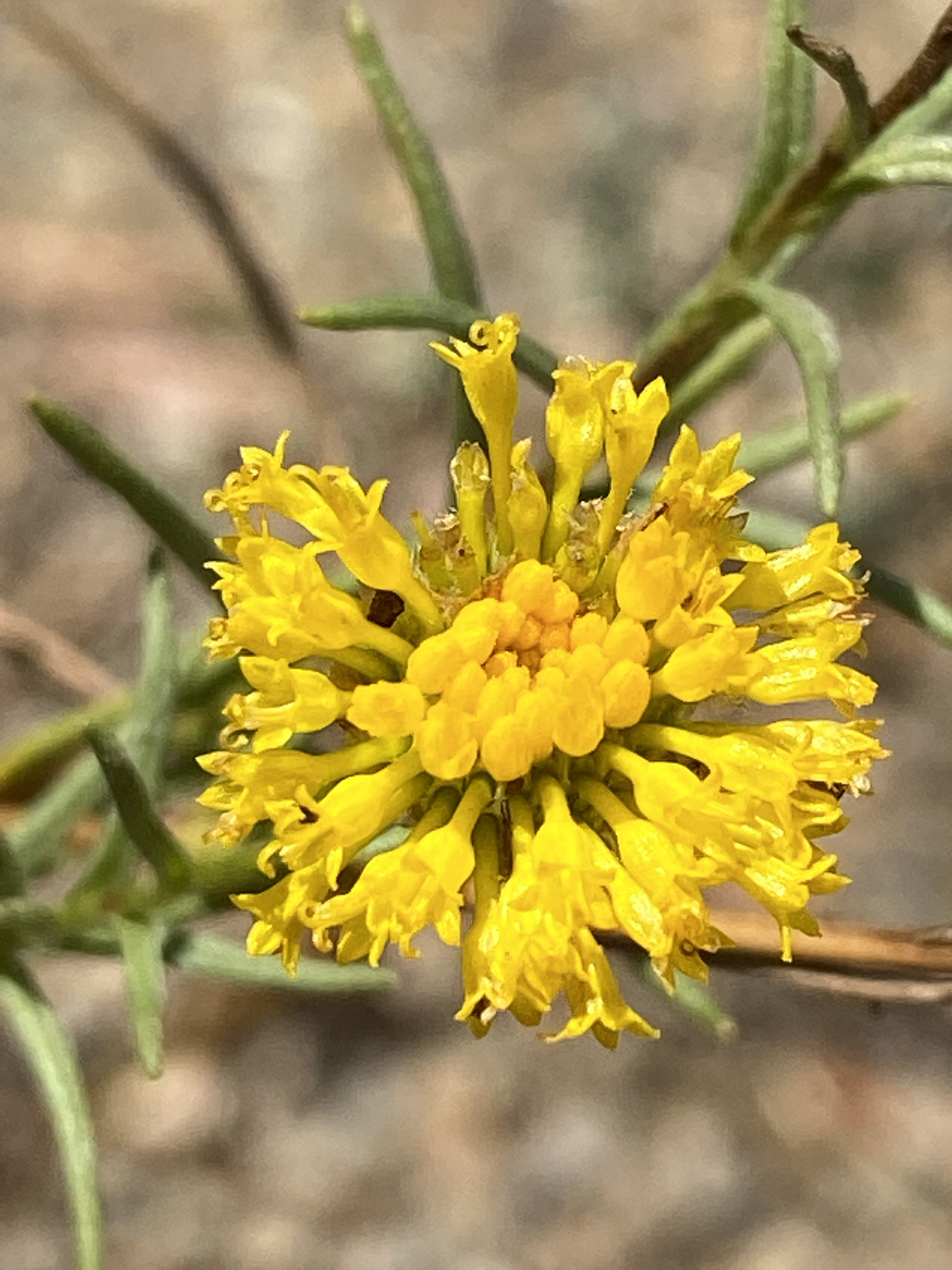

Conservation status
- Endangered (EPBC Act)

Scientific classification
- Kingdom: Plantae
- Clade: Embryophytes
- Clade: Tracheophytes
- Clade: Spermatophytes
- Clade: Angiosperms
- Clade: Eudicots
- Clade: Asterids
- Order: Asterales
- Family: Asteraceae
- Genus: Rutidosis
- Species: R. leptorrhynchoides

Binomial name
- Rutidosis leptorrhynchoides F.Muell.

= Rutidosis leptorrhynchoides =

Button wrinklewort

Species of plant

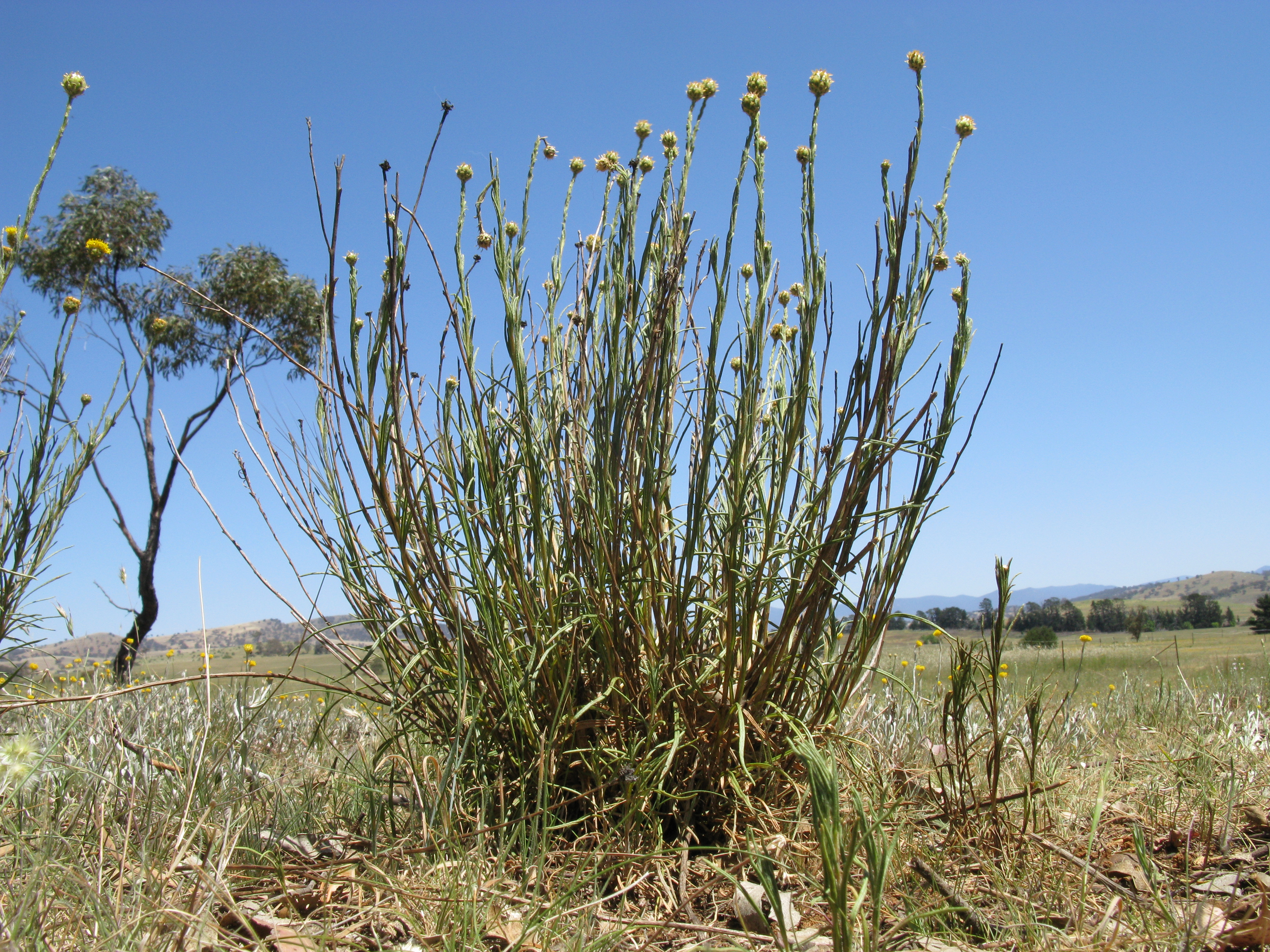
Habit

Rutidosis leptorrhynchoides, commonly known as button wrinklewort, is a flowering plant in the family Asteraceae. It is an upright, tufted, perennial herb with bright green leaves and yellow button-shaped flowers.

== Description ==
Rutidosis leptorrhynchoides is a perennial herb with a simple or multi-branched from a woody rootstock, 15–30 cm (5.9–11.8 in) high, leafy, usually stems more or less smooth except those toward the base may be more or less woolly. The leaves are mostly borne on aerial stems, narrow, linear, bright green, 15–35 mm (0.59–1.38 in) long, 0.5–1.5 mm (0.020–0.059 in) wide, margins rolled under, mostly smooth and the apex pointed. Each stem has one yellow flower, 8–15 mm (0.31–0.59 in) in diameter made up of numerous florets about 7 mm (0.28 in) long, bracts arranged in rows of 5-8, dull green, edges occasionally toothed or more or less jagged. Flowering mostly occurs in summer and the fruit is a narrow, obovoid cypsela, brown, about 1.5 mm (0.059 in) long with several bristles 3 mm (0.12 in) long.

== Taxonomy ==
Rutidosis leptorrhynchoides was first formally described in 1866 by Ferdinand von Mueller and the description was published in Fragmenta Phytographiae Australiae.

== Distribution and habitat ==
Button wrinklewort grows in grassland and woodland in New South Wales, Victoria and the Australian Capital Territory.

== Conservation ==
It is an endangered species under the Australian Environment Protection and Biodiversity Conservation Act 1999.
