= Phacellothrix =

Scientific classification
- Kingdom: Plantae
- Clade: Embryophytes
- Clade: Tracheophytes
- Clade: Angiosperms
- Clade: Eudicots
- Clade: Asterids
- Order: Asterales
- Family: Asteraceae
- Genus: Phacellothrix; F.Muell.
- Species: P. cladochaeta

Binomial name
- Phacellothrix cladochaeta (F.Muell.) F.Muell.

Synonyms
- Species synonymy: Helichrysum cladochaetum F.Muell.; Rutidosis brownii Benth.

Genus of flowering plants

Phacellothrix is a genus of flowering plants in the pussy's-toes tribe within the daisy family.

== Species ==
The only known species is Phacellothrix cladochaeta, native to Australia (Queensland and Northern Territory) and Papua New Guinea.
