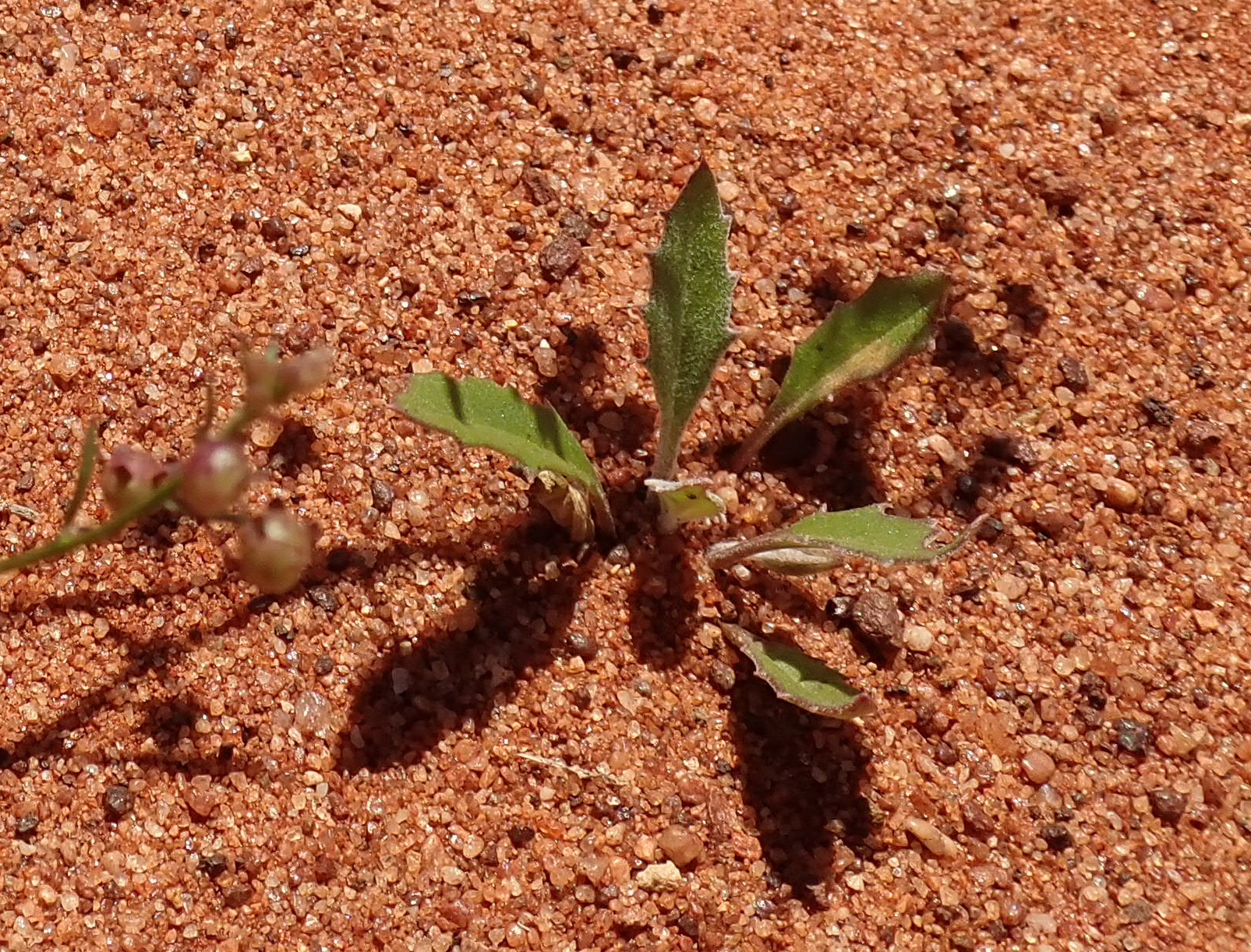
- Goodenia pusilliflora in Ledknapper Nature Reserve

Scientific classification
- Kingdom: Plantae
- Clade: Tracheophytes
- Clade: Angiosperms
- Clade: Eudicots
- Clade: Asterids
- Order: Asterales
- Family: Goodeniaceae
- Genus: Goodenia
- Species: G. pusilliflora

Binomial name
- Goodenia pusilliflora F.Muell.
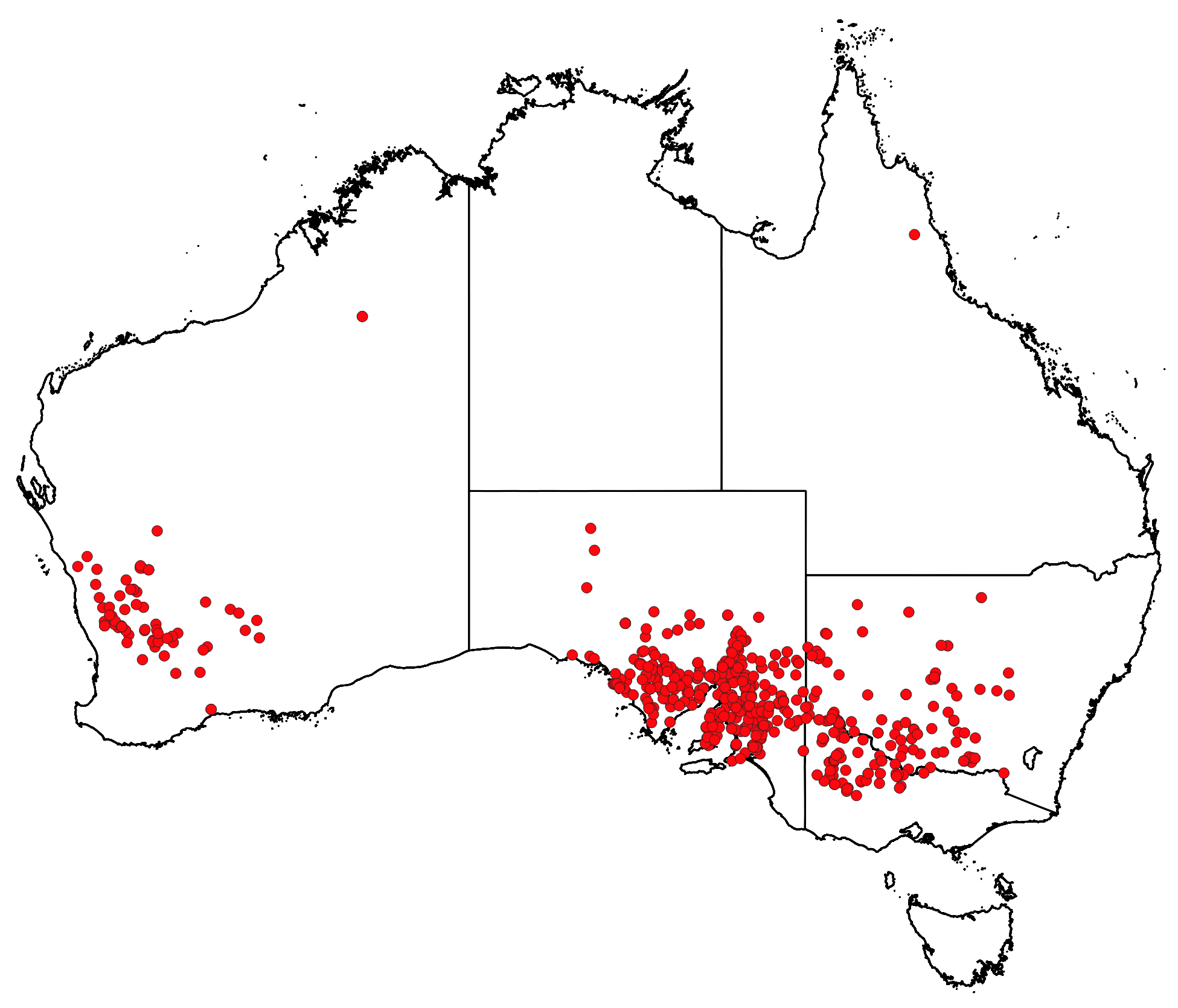
- Occurrence data from AVH

Synonyms
- Goodenia calogynoides E.Pritz.

= Goodenia pusilliflora =

Small-flower goodenia

Species of plant

Goodenia pusilliflora, commonly known as small-flower goodenia, is a species of flowering plant in the family Goodeniaceae and is endemic to drier parts of southern Australia. It is a low-lying to ascending herb with oblong to egg-shaped leaves with toothed or lyrate edges, and racemes of small yellow flowers.

== Description ==
Goodenia pusilliflora is a low-lying to ascending herb with stems up to 20 cm (7.9 in) long. The leaves at the base of the plant are oblong to egg-shaped, sometimes narrow lance-shaped with the narrower end towards the base, 15–80 mm (0.59–3.15 in) long and 5–15 mm (0.20–0.59 in) wide, with toothed to lyrate edges. The flowers are arranged in racemes up to 200 mm (7.9 in) long with leaf-like bracts, each flower on a pedicel 10–70 mm (0.39–2.76 in) long. The sepals are elliptic, about 2 mm (0.079 in) long and the corolla is yellow, 5–7 mm (0.20–0.28 in) long and hairy towards the centre. The lower lobes of the corolla are about 2 mm (0.079 in) long with wings 1–1.5 mm (0.039–0.059 in) wide. Flowering mainly occurs from July to October and the fruit is a slightly flattened spherical capsule, 5–6 mm (0.20–0.24 in) long.

== Taxonomy and naming ==
Goodenia pusilliflora was first formally described in 1888 by Ferdinand von Mueller in The Victorian Naturalist.

In 1990, Roger Charles Carolin selected the specimens collected at the junction of the Murray and Darling Rivers collected by Charlotte Holding as the lectotype. The specific epithet (pusilliflora) means "very small-flowered".

== Distribution and habitat ==
This goodenia grows in a variety of communities where water lies after rain in the drier areas of Western Australia, South Australia, New South Wales and Victoria.

== Gallery ==
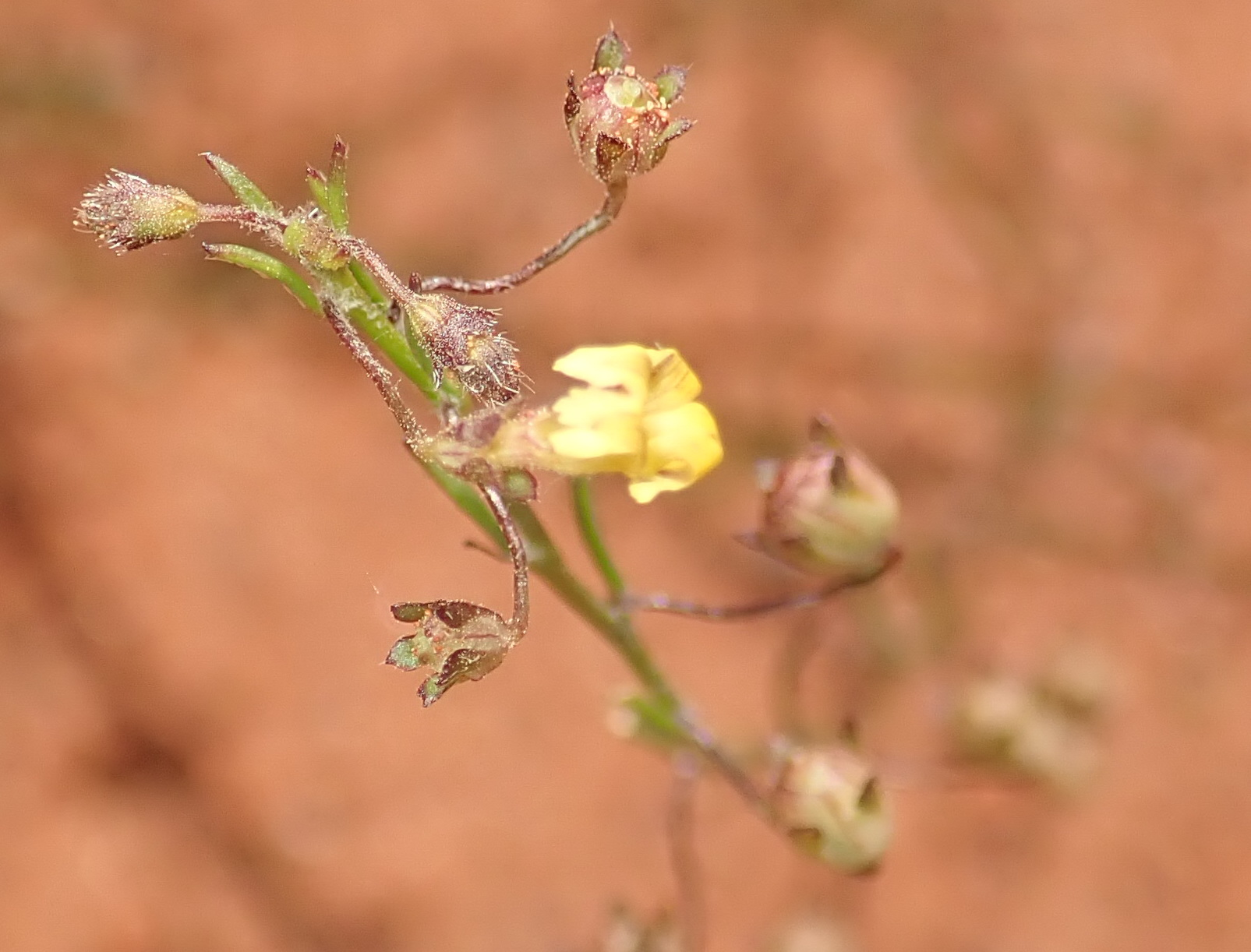
Flower and developing fruit

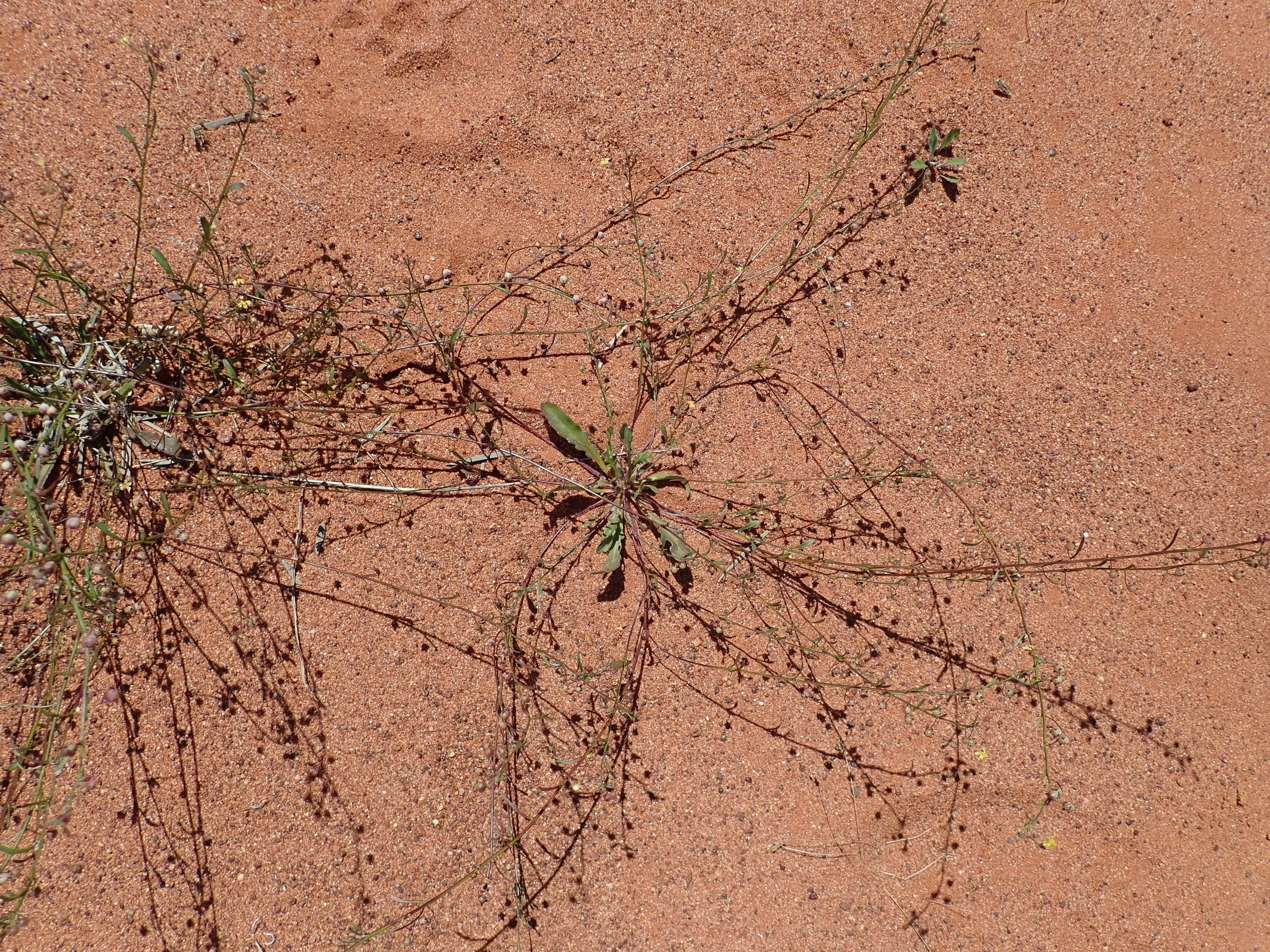
Habit

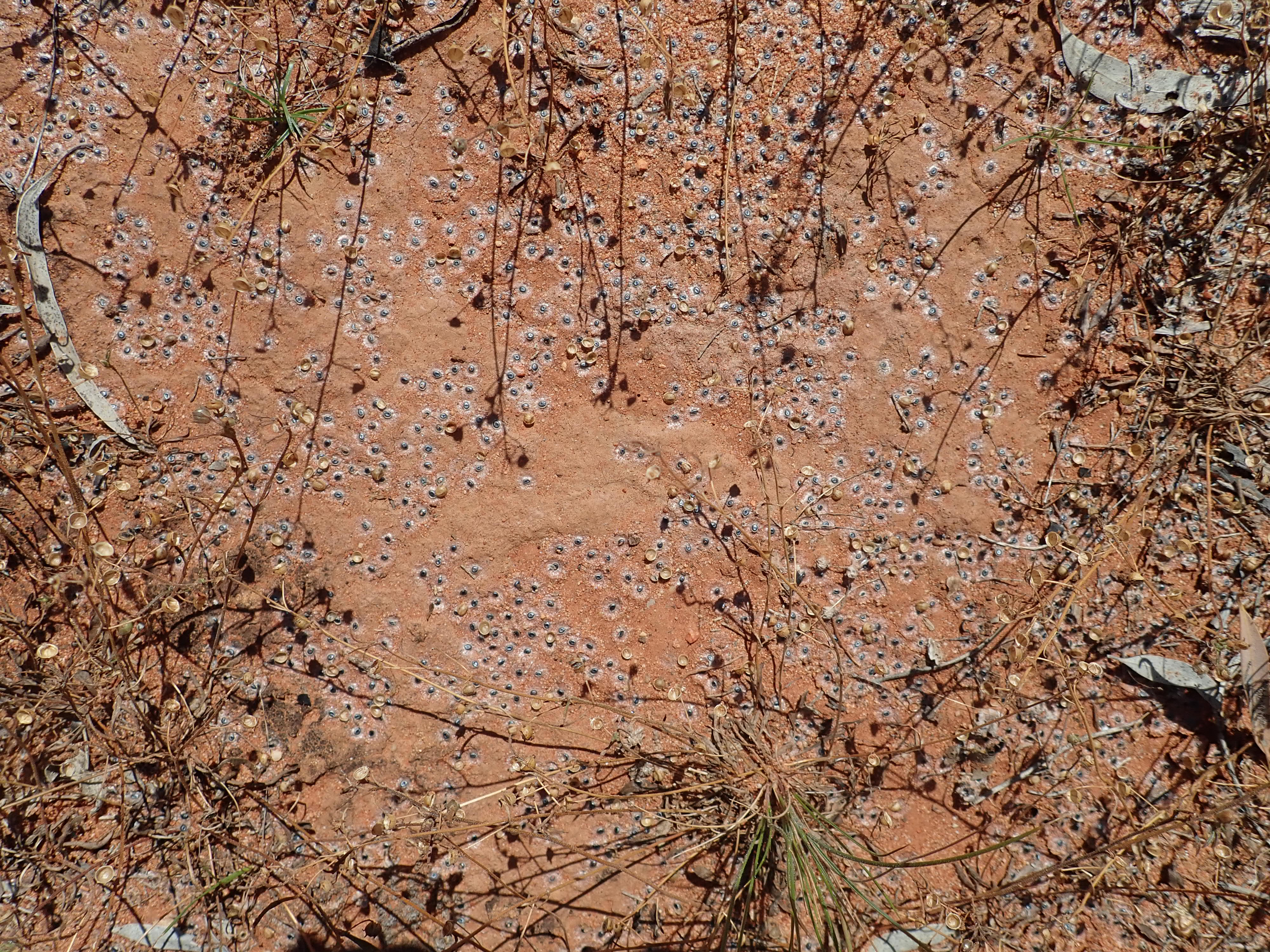
Seeds
