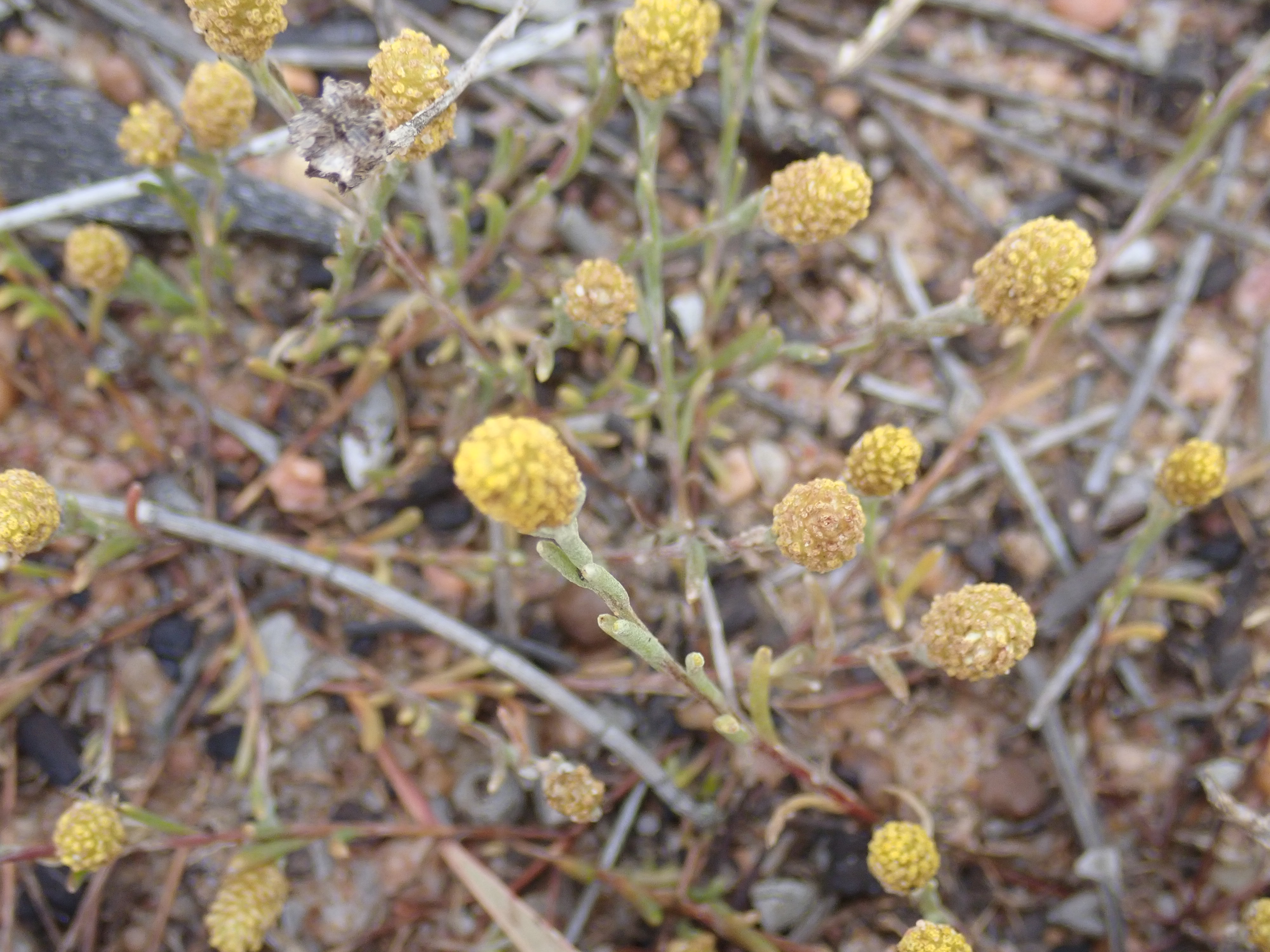

Scientific classification
- Kingdom: Plantae
- Clade: Tracheophytes
- Clade: Angiosperms
- Clade: Eudicots
- Clade: Asterids
- Order: Asterales
- Family: Asteraceae
- Genus: Calocephalus
- Species: C. sonderi

Binomial name
- Calocephalus sonderi F.Muell.

= Calocephalus sonderi =

Species of plant

Calocephalus sonderi (common name pale beauty-heads) is a plant in the family Asteraceae, found in South Australia, Victoria, Queensland and New South Wales.

It was first described by Ferdinand von Mueller in 1859. The specific epithet, sonderi, honours the German botanist Otto Wilhelm Sonder.

== Description ==
Calocephalus sonderi is an annual, erect herb, growing from 10 cm to 50 cm high and is woolly, and grey to silvery in colour. The leaves are mostly alternate and from 2–3 cm long by 1 mm to 2 mm wide. The upper leaves smaller and have non-hairy appendage at their apices. It flowers from spring to summer and is found in grasslands and open woodlands. It is widespread in inland New South Wales.
