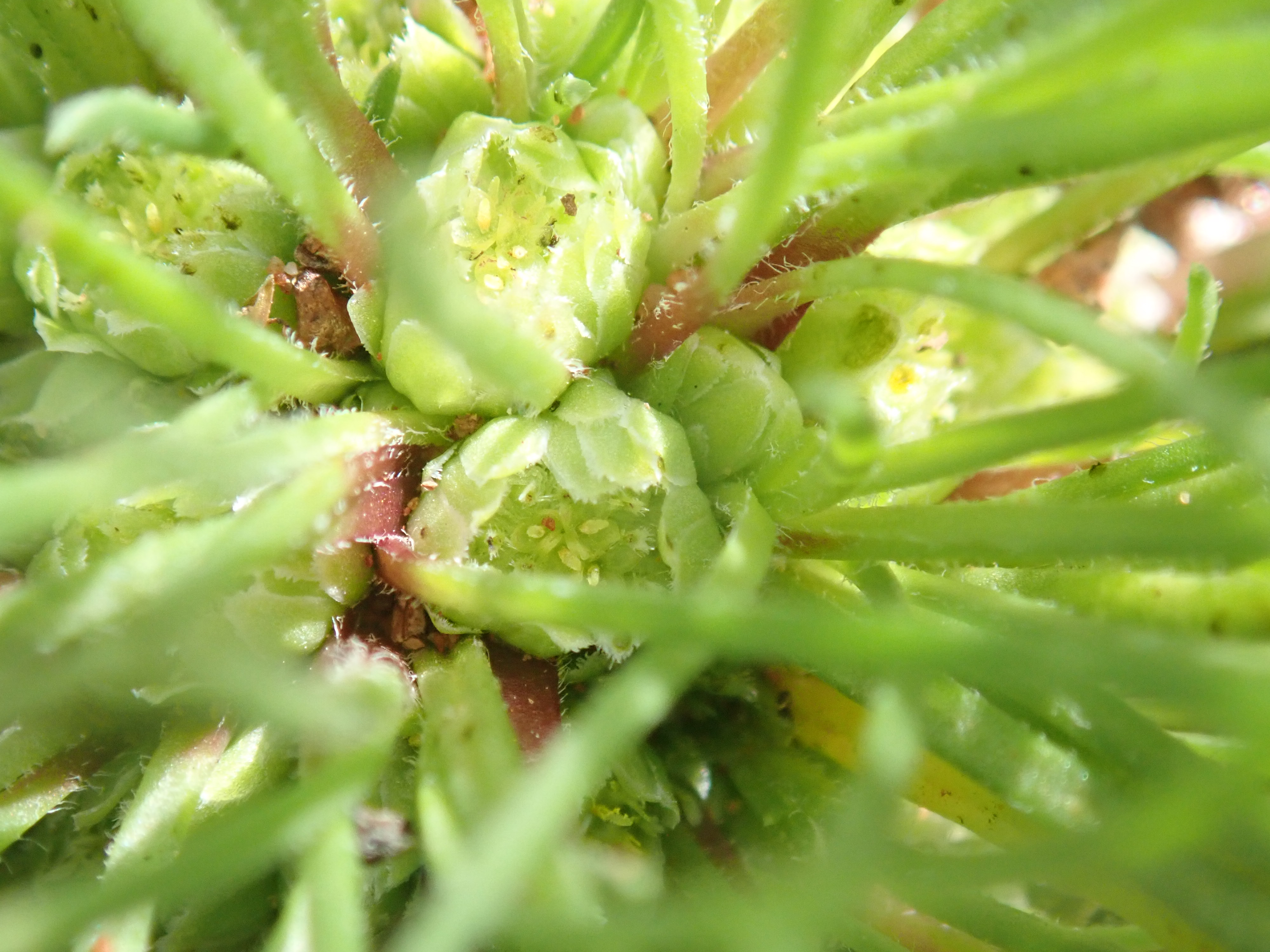

Scientific classification
- Kingdom: Plantae
- Clade: Embryophytes
- Clade: Tracheophytes
- Clade: Angiosperms
- Clade: Eudicots
- Clade: Asterids
- Order: Asterales
- Family: Asteraceae
- Subfamily: Asteroideae
- Tribe: Astereae
- Subtribe: Brachyscominae
- Genus: Isoetopsis; Turcz.
- Species: I. graminifolia

Binomial name
- Isoetopsis graminifolia Turcz.

Synonyms
- Cotula sect. Isoetopsis (Turcz.) Baill.

= Isoetopsis =

Genus of flowering plants

Isoetopsis is a genus of Australian flowering plants in the daisy family.

There is only one known species, Isoetopsis graminifolia, reported from every state in Australia though not from Northern Territory. This new species was known and published in 1851 by the Nicolai Stepanowitsch Turczaninow. Grass-cushion is a common name for this species.

The species is listed as threatened in Tasmania.

== Phylogeny and Taxonomy ==
Isoetopsis graminifolia is the only known species in the genus Isoetopsis, which is endemic to Australia. The species was first described in 1851 by the Russian botanist Nicolai Stepanowitsch Turczaninow, based on specimens collected by J. Drummond. For over a century, Isoetopsis was traditionally placed in the tribe Anthemideae of the Asteraceae family, primarily due to superficial morphological similarities.

However, in 1973, Robinson and Brettell reconstruct the classification of Isoetopsis based on detailed morphological observations. They noted that the genus exhibits significant deviations from typical Anthemideae traits. Notably, the pollen grains of Isoetopsis lack the characteristic columnar structures seen in Anthemideae. Moreover, the stigmatic branches are smooth, thin, and non-truncate, which aligns more closely with genera in the tribe Astereae. Additionally, a unique fibrous tissue extending from the base of the style to the cypsela was identified, a feature not found in Anthemideae but observed in some Astereae members. These anatomical distinctions led the authors to propose transferring Isoetopsis from Anthemideae to Astereae.

The placement of Isoetopsis within Astereae was later confirmed by Bayer and Cross in 2002 through molecular phylogenetic analysis. They analyzed three chloroplast DNA regions—trnL intron, trnL/F spacer, and matK—across 43 genera of Asteraceae. The results revealed that Isoetopsis consistently grouped within Astereae, showing close affinities with members of the subtribe Asterinae. This DNA sequencing evidence supported previous morphological assessments and resolved decades of taxonomic uncertainty.

More recently, a 2024 phylogenomic study by Schmidt-Lebuhn et al. revealed even deeper evolutionary relationships. Using ultrafast bootstrap analysis and genome-scale data, This data can let us know how much confidence we can proof their relationship. The study demonstrated that Isoetopsis, Elachanthus, Kippistia, and Minuria form a well-supported monophyletic clade, that mean they have the same ancestor. In the past, only Kippistia was included in this genus; the other two genera were not considered part of it. Interestingly, Isoetopsis and Elachanthus were identified as sister groups, suggesting a very close common ancestry. Despite historical assumptions that Isoetopsis was unrelated to Minuria due to differences in life form (annual vs. perennial) and stem elongation—recent findings show that the morphological variability within Minuria is sufficient to encompass the traits of Isoetopsis. The authors suggest that Isoetopsis may have evolved through internode shortening from an Elachanthus-like ancestor, which itself likely diverged from within Minuria. As a result, the authors propose merging Isoetopsis into a broadened circumscription of the genus Minuria.

This taxonomic revision reflects a broader trend in systematics, where molecular evidence reveals unexpected evolutionary connections and reshapes long-standing classifications.
