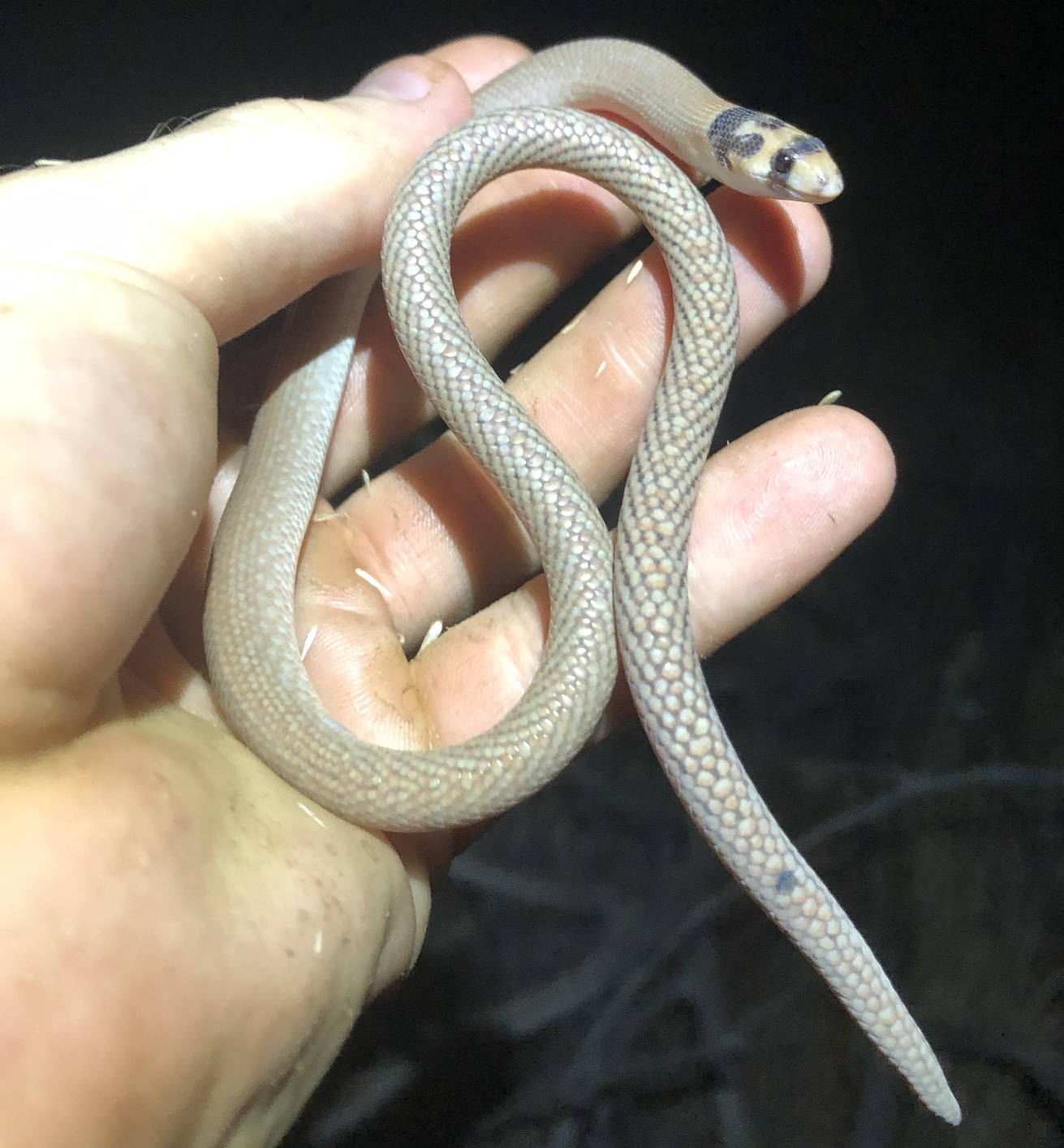

Conservation status
- Least Concern (IUCN 3.1)

Scientific classification
- Kingdom: Animalia
- Phylum: Chordata
- Class: Reptilia
- Order: Squamata
- Suborder: Gekkota
- Family: Pygopodidae
- Genus: Pygopus
- Species: P. nigriceps

Binomial name
- Pygopus nigriceps (Fischer, 1882)

Synonyms
- Cryptodelma nigriceps Fischer, 1882

= Hooded scaly-foot =

Species of lizard

The hooded scaly-foot (Pygopus nigriceps), also known as western scaly-foot, black-headed scaly-foot or western hooded scaly-foot, is an endemic Australian legless lizard of the family Pygopodidae.

== Description ==
Adult hooded scaly-foots range from 45 to 55 cm long, with an average snout to vent length of 22.7 cm. Females are generally larger than males. Hooded scaly-foots show no trace of forelimbs, whilst the hind limbs are reduced to scaly flaps. These hind limbs are small and paddle-shaped, with modified scales which do not aid in movement.

The scales of the hooded scaly-foot are smooth and weakly glossed. Usually, it has 120 or more ventral scales, which are in a paired series, much larger than the adjacent body scales. Body colour varies from brown to reddish-brown, with desert specimens usually a more orangish colour and other individuals a duller brown. It is white below. The species has little to no body pattern, with oblique dark lines converging mid-dorsally.

These scaly-foots are characterised by black bands across the head and neck which may look like a hood. This hood comprises a band across the eyes onto the lips, a dark smudge on the nostrils, and a broad band across the neck. These dark bands may fade or merge with age. The lidless eye is well developed, covered with a transparent spectacle. The species is able to lick clean this spectacle using its broad, fleshy tongue. It also retains conspicuous ear openings.

The hooded scaly-foot can be differentiated from the four other species in the genus Pygopus if the nostril contacts the first upper labial scale.

== Ecology ==
The hooded scaly-foot is found throughout Australia, except for the wetter areas of the south and Tasmania.

The species is mostly nocturnal, due to the generally hot weather where it occurs, although in cooler conditions, it forages by day. It is a terrestrial surface-dweller, but individuals have been noted up to 1.5 m above the ground in vegetation. Captive scaly-foots have lived up to seven years, but little is known about ages of individuals in the wild.

Hooded scaly-foots are found in a range of habitats, favouring dry open habits. They are found particularly in sandy deserts vegetated with triodia, but also in open woodlands and shrublands. The species shelters under rocks and woody debris, in grass tussocks and soil cracks, abandoned burrows, insect holes, and in termite mounds.

== Diet ==
The hooded scaly-foot feeds predominantly on surface-active arthropods. Insects are the main prey type, while it is also noted to feed on spider egg sacks and scorpions. The species has been observed to actively search for prey. Once caught, larger prey is crushed and disabled as the hooded scaly-foot rotates its body rapidly, in a crocodile-roll fashion. Body fluids are then licked up.

== Behavior and defense ==
Scaly-foots move through lateral undulations of their bodies and tails, and in open terrain they have been noted to move in wriggling leaps. The hind-limb flaps are held alongside the body during movement, although they may be extended when stressed or when climbing. As stated earlier, hooded scaly-foots have a voice. This harsh squeak is emitted under stress and occasionally in social interactions.

When disturbed, hooded scaly-foot raise their heads and fore parts of their bodies from the ground, flatten their necks, and flicker their tongues, occasionally striking out. The species does this in apparent mimicry of venomous snakes, to deter predators. The markings on the hooded scaly-foot resemble those of young brown snakes. When grasped, they struggle fiercely, rotating their bodies and uttering long squeaking sounds. They readily shed their tails and will regenerate a new one. The regenerating tail can be identified through a change in scale arrangement and pattern.

== Reproduction ==
Hooded scaly-foots are oviparous, laying two parchment-shelled eggs per clutch. Pygopus species have been noted to lay communally, while known incubation periods range from 66 to 77 days. Pelvic spurs, modified spine-like scales, are found in addition to the hind-limb ‘flaps’ on males, are thought to assist the male in gripping the female.

== Predation ==
Predators of the hooded scaly-foot include: raptors, elapid snakes, goannas, feral cats, and foxes. Burton's snake lizard (Lialis burtonis) is also known to eat legless lizards. In all cases, legless lizards are a minor component of the predator's diet.
