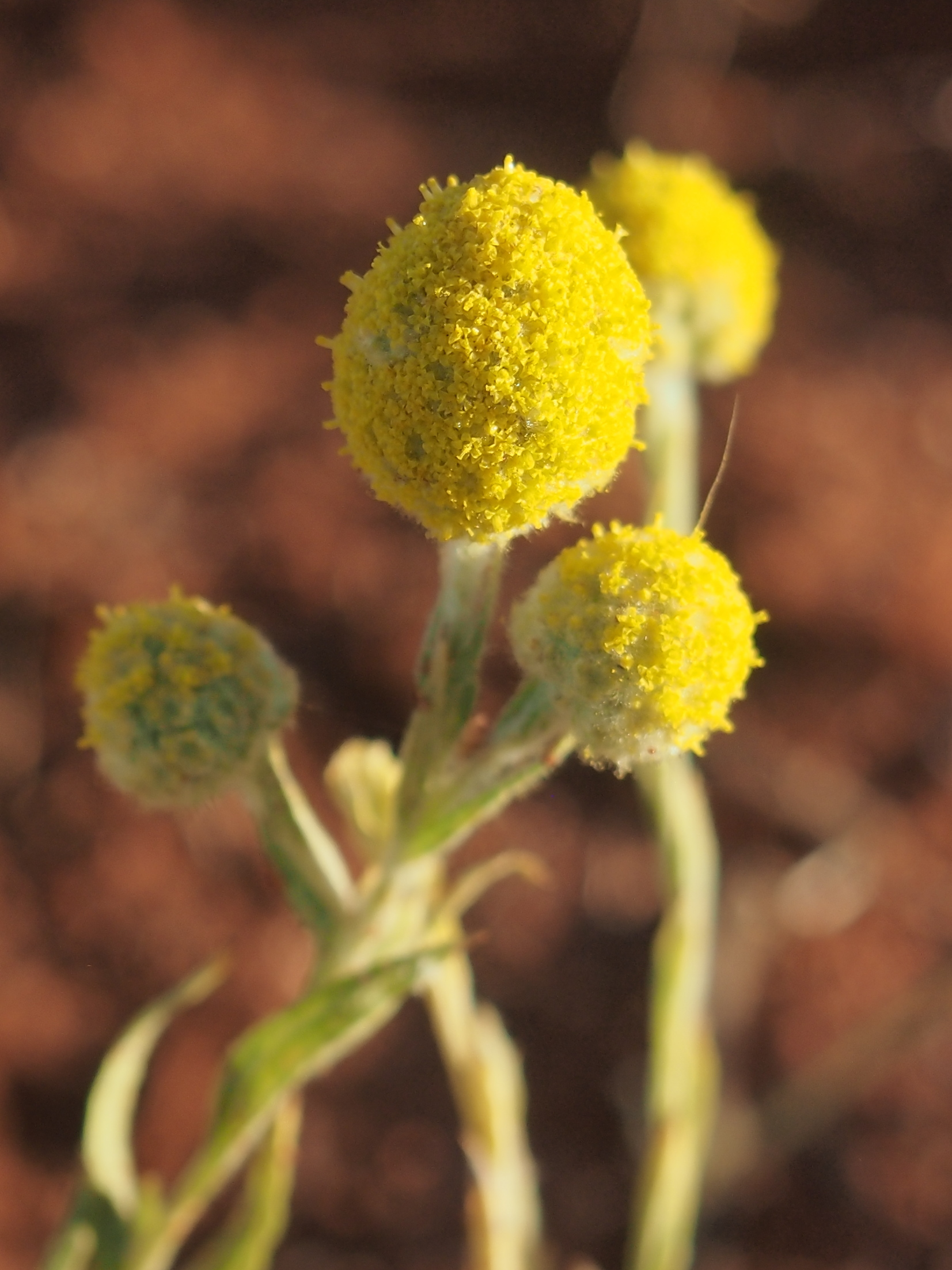

Scientific classification
- Kingdom: Plantae
- Clade: Tracheophytes
- Clade: Angiosperms
- Clade: Eudicots
- Clade: Asterids
- Order: Asterales
- Family: Asteraceae
- Genus: Calocephalus
- Species: C. citreus

Binomial name
- Calocephalus citreus Less.

= Calocephalus citreus =

Lemon beauty-heads

Species of flowering plant

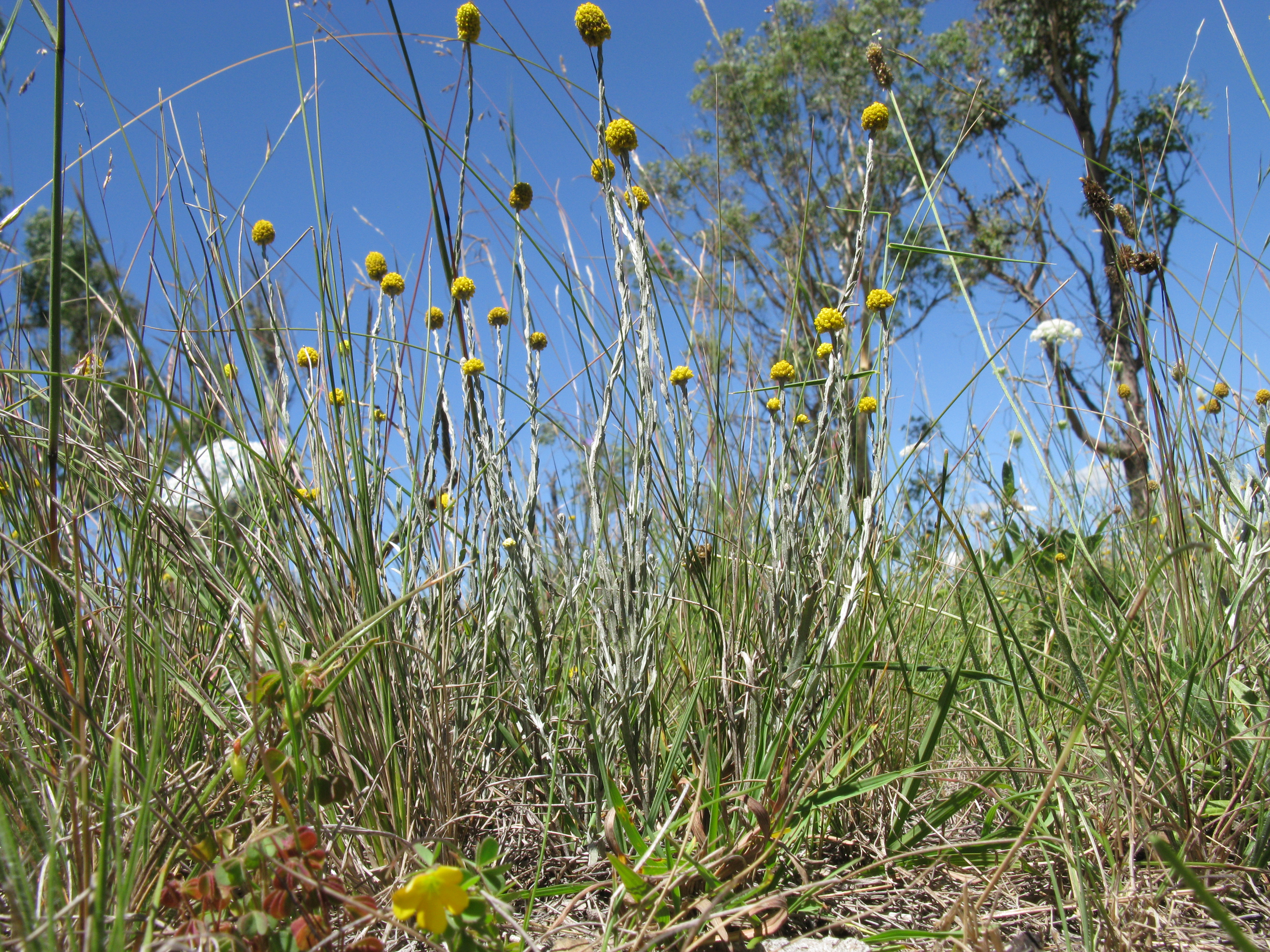
Habit

Calocephalus citreus, commonly known as lemon beauty-heads, is a species of flowering plant in the family Asteraceae. It has yellow cylindrical shaped flowers and grey stems and grows in the eastern states of Australia

== Description ==
Calocephalus citreus is a perennial herb with upright, slender, light grey, fuzzy, slightly angular stems growing to about 15–60 cm (5.9–23.6 in) high. The leaves are arranged usually opposite, linear to lance-shaped, mostly 10–20 mm (0.39–0.79 in) long, 1–2 mm (0.039–0.079 in) wide and covered with short, matted, dense hairs and prominent veins. The heads are solitary, oblong to globose shaped, about 0.4–2 cm (0.16–0.79 in) long, lemon-coloured in bud, bright yellow in flower. The 8-11 bracts are flat, conduplicate, 1.9–3.4 mm (0.075–0.134 in) long with 2-3 florets per head. Flowering occurs from September to March and the fruit is a cypsela 0.7–0.85 mm (0.028–0.033 in) long, brown, and the upper surface covered in fine, feathery bristles.

== Taxonomy and naming ==
Calocephalus citreus was first formally described in 1832 by Christian Friedrich Lessing and the description was published in Synopsis Generum Compositarum. The specific epithet (citreus) means "lemon-coloured".

== Distribution and habitat ==
Lemon beauty-heads grows in low-lying areas in herbfields, dry forest and grassy woodland in eastern states of Australia and the Australian Capital Territory.
