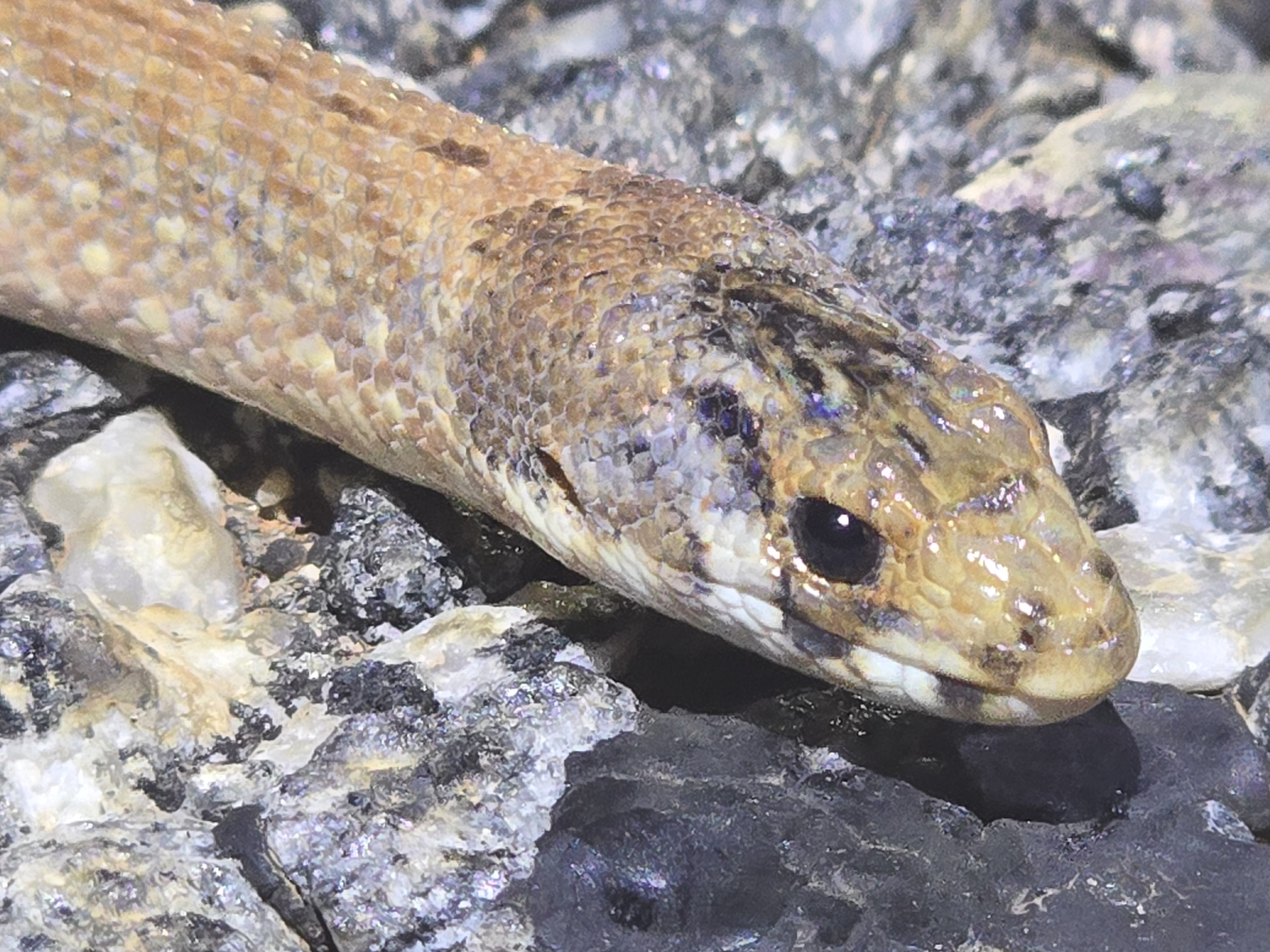

Conservation status
- Least Concern (IUCN 3.1)

Scientific classification
- Domain: Eukaryota
- Kingdom: Animalia
- Phylum: Chordata
- Class: Reptilia
- Order: Squamata
- Infraorder: Gekkota
- Family: Pygopodidae
- Genus: Pygopus
- Species: P. schraderi

Binomial name
- Pygopus schraderi Boulenger, 1913

= Eastern hooded scaly-foot =

Species of lizard

The eastern hooded scaly-foot or eastern scaly-foot (Pygopus schraderi) is a species of flap-footed lizard found in the complex heaths of the lower west coast and the spinifex grasslands of mainland Australia. They are popular pets and are often mistaken for snakes due to their limbless appearance.

== Taxonomy ==
=== Family Pygopodidae ===
The family of Pygopods consists of 41 described species found only in Australia and New Guinea. They inhabit most of mainland Australia except for south-eastern Victoria and Tasmania, preferring dry open habitats.

Pygopods, or ‘legless lizards’, move by lateral undulations of the body and tail. They have no forelimbs but have retained vestigial hind limbs in the form of small scaly flaps that are usually held flat on either side of the body.

Pygopods can further be distinguished from snakes by their broad fleshy tongues, ear-openings (which snakes lack), and long tails, which grow up to four times the length of the body and can be voluntarily broken off. Pygopods also have scales on their belly that are the same size as adjacent scales and larger scales that are in a paired series. By contrast, most snakes have one series of enlarged, transverse ventral scales.

Despite their snake-like appearance, the closest relatives of Pygopods are geckos. The relationship is so close that there is growing agreement that the families are actually one and the same. Shared characteristics between the two groups include: a similar skull and inner ear, the sharing of a voice in the form of a ‘squeak’ and both species lay parchment-shelled eggs in clutch sizes of two. Both species also share the ability to lick clean the clear spectacles covering their lidless eyes.

=== Genus Pygopus ===
Five species fall under the genus Pygopus; the common scaly-foot (Pygopus lepidopodus), the western hooded scaly-foot (Pygopus nigriceps), Roberts’ scaly-foot (Pygopus robertsi), the eastern hooded scaly-foot (Pygopus schraderi), and the northern hooded scaly-foot (Pygopus steelescotti). All four species are large and robust, with round snouts and prominent ear-openings. They have smooth to keeled scales in 21 or more rows, enlarged paired ventrals, long tails and very large, well-developed limb-flaps. The identification between the species can often be determined by the presence or extent of dorsal keels and whether the nostril contracts at the 1st upper labial scale or is separated.

=== Common names ===
Pygopods are also referred to as snake lizards and flap-footed lizards.

== Etymology ==
The species common name comes from the dark symmetrical scales on top of the lizard’s head which give it a "hooded appearance".

The specific name, schraderi, is not in honor of Carl Wilhelm Otto Schrader, the German explorer and naturalist. Boulenger (1913) does not give a specific etymology, but notes that the holotype was from the collection of a Mr. P. Schrader, after whom he presumably named the species.

== Description ==
The eastern hooded scaly-foot is the second smallest species in the genus Pygopus. It has a snout-vent length of 198mm but can grow to lengths of up to 475mm, with females growing larger than males. Their tails alone account for more than three-quarters of their total body length. However, they will readily shed their tails when threatened and are capable of re-growing their tails so at times their tail may be shorter than their body. A re-growing tail is indicated by an abrupt change in pattern and scale arrangement.

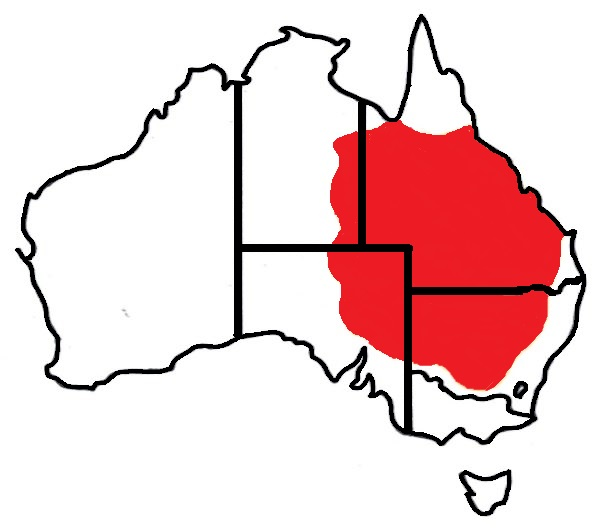
Distribution Map for the Eastern Hooded Scaly-foot (Pygopus schraderi)

The markings on these lizards range from reddish-brown to pale grey on the upper body, with a whitish colour underneath. Dark brown to black symmetrical scales on top of the lizard’s head give it a ‘hooded appearance’. These head markings closely resemble those of young brown snakes (Pseudonaja spp.), although it is not known whether this is due to direct mimicry or whether the pattern helps to regulate temperature. The body scales may be dark-edged, forming on overall reticulated or net-like pattern. Individual paler and darker scales may form distinct but irregular V-shaped cross-bands or sometimes broken longitudinal lines or stripes, especially on the flanks. All of these markings as still present, but sometimes only faintly in larger individuals. Its scales are keeled, with body scales in 21-25 rows (including ventrals) at mid-body. The eastern hooded scaly-foot has fewer than 120 ventral scales that are noticeably wider than adjacent body scales and its nostril contracts at the 1st upper labial scale.

== Distribution and habitat ==
The eastern hooded scaly-foot is found in inland New South Wales, Victoria, eastern South Australia, inland Queensland and adjacent parts of the Northern Territory. It is found in dry to arid zones in a variety of open habitats ranging from stony plains and dry woodlands to arid mallee, mulga scrubs and spinifex-dominate desert grasslands. It prefers stony and heavy soils and is dependent on large, interconnected territories. Due to its inability to sustain or rapidly recover from aerobic activity, this species will shelter in soil cracks, grass and under debris, as well as large burrows to avoid predation.

In NSW, the hooded scaly-foot is rare in the NSW Murray Catchment, but is found in areas supporting native grasslands and grassy woodlands, especially in the region bordering the Murrumbidgee Catchment in the north.

Within Victoria, the hooded scaly-foot is rarely encountered and is known to exist at only six sites including Terrick Terrick National Park, Korrack Korrack grasslands and areas west of Mildura such as Lake Ranfurly and Neds Corner Station.

== Behaviour ==
Not a lot is known about the ecology of the eastern hooded scaly-foot, however research has shown that is primarily nocturnal, although populations in southern Victoria have been observed to be active during the day. They are also thought to be inactive during winter. Although usually encountered singly, occasional aggregations have been reported, possibly related to breeding

Snake mimicry is an important part of this species’ survival strategy. To deter predators, the eastern hooded scaly-foot will rear and flicker its tongue in apparent mimicry of venomous snakes. Unfortunately, this behaviour is so impressive that this harmless species is often mistaken for a venomous snake and killed. When grasped, they struggle fiercely, rotating their bodies and uttering long harsh squeaking sounds. These sounds are also emitted occasionally during social interactions.

The eastern hooded scaly-foot has been observed to excavate tunnels in soft soil by removing soil with the mouth and rotating the body to widen the tunnel. Such tunnelling behaviour may allow the animal access to insects, on which it feeds.

Captive scaly-foots have been recorded to live for up to 7 years. However, little is known about ages of individuals on the wild.

== Predators ==
Predators of the eastern hooded scaly-foot include raptors, goannas, feral cats, foxes and elapid snakes.

== Hunting and diet ==
The eastern hooded scaly-foot is a hypo-metabolic (low energy) specialist that requires minimal amounts of food and water. They feed predominantly on surface-active arthropods such as spiders; but they also feed on spider egg sacks and scorpions. This species has been observed to actively search for prey. Once caught, prey is disabled and crushed as the hooded scaly-foot rapidly rotates its body along the long axis. Dentition is pleurodont, with the teeth blunt and rounded, and firmly attached to the bone.

== Reproduction ==
The eastern hooded scaly-foot is oviparous and lays a clutch of two eggs (occasionally one or three) once a year in spring or early summer with breeding occurring from August to March. Pregnant females have been reported in January and February and incubation periods range from 66 to 77 days. Pygopus species have been noted to lay communally.

In captivity, few courtship or mating displays have been observed. Males will follow the female while flicking their tongue repeatedly. Pelvic spurs, modified spine-like scales and hind-limb ‘flaps’ on males are thought to assist the male in gripping the female.

== Captivity ==
Pygopods are easy to maintain in captivity and are highly sought after. However, they are rarely available due to their unpredictable breeding performance. A license is required before this species can be kept as a pet in Australia.

== Conservation ==
The eastern hooded scaly-foot has not yet been assessed for the IUCN Red List but it is listed as ‘threatened’ under the Flora and Fauna Guarantee Act 1988 and is classified as ‘critically endangered’ in Victoria under the Department of Sustainability and Environment’s Advisory List of Threatened Fauna. Threats to the eastern hooded scaly-foot include:

- Climate change affecting sex determination
- Habitat loss and degradation
- Misidentification
- Elevated levels of predation due to habitat modification
- Predation from foxes and feral cats
- Altered and inappropriate fire regimes
- Poor advice and planning

In Victoria, the Mallee CMA is undertaking a number of monitoring based projects to help address knowledge gaps for the eastern hooded scaly-foot. The Mallee CMA aims to:

- Control pest plants and prevent weed invasion in known habitat;
- Control pest animals in known habitat;
- Reduce the impact of grazing by fencing off patches of vegetation; and
- Reduce the use of insecticides in hooded scaly-foot sensitive areas.
