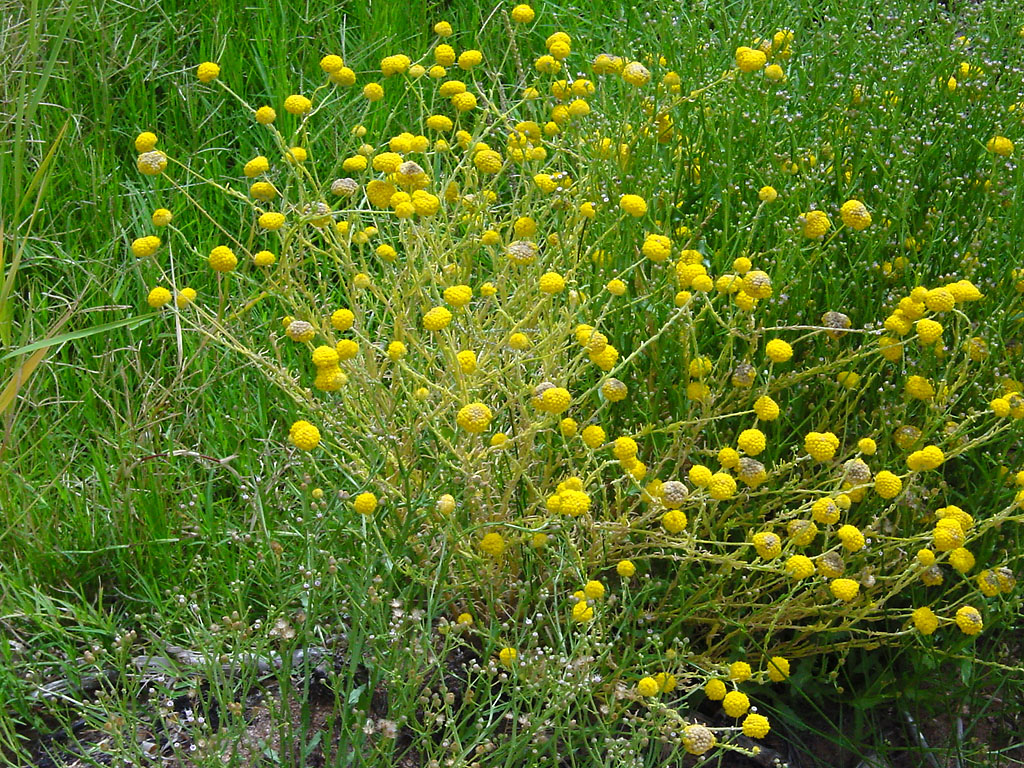
- Calocephalus platycephalus

Scientific classification
- Kingdom: Plantae
- Clade: Embryophytes
- Clade: Tracheophytes
- Clade: Spermatophytes
- Clade: Angiosperms
- Clade: Eudicots
- Clade: Asterids
- Order: Asterales
- Family: Asteraceae
- Subfamily: Asteroideae
- Tribe: Gnaphalieae
- Genus: Calocephalus; R.Br.

Synonyms
- Achrysum A.Gray

= Calocephalus =

Beauty-heads

Genus of flowering plants

Calocephalus is a genus of flowering plants in the family Asteraceae. It is endemic to Australia, where it is represented in every state.

These are annual and perennial herbs and shrubs. The leaves are arranged alternately or oppositely, or both. The herbage is hairy. Flower heads occur at the tips of the stems. There are one to 22 tubular disc florets per head. The fruit is a cypsela with a pappus of narrow scales or simple or plume-like bristles.

Species

- Calocephalus aervoides (F.Muell.) Benth. – woolly beauty-heads
- Calocephalus citreus Less. – lemon beauty-heads
- Calocephalus francisii (F.Muell.) Benth. – fine-leaf beauty-heads
- Calocephalus knappii (F.Muell.) Ewart & Jean White
- Calocephalus lacteus Less. – milky beauty-heads
- Calocephalus lessingii Ewart
- Calocephalus multiflorus (Turcz.) Benth. – yellow-top
- Calocephalus platycephalus (F.Muell.) Benth. – billybuttons, yellow top, western beauty-heads
- Calocephalus sonderi F.Muell. – pale beauty-heads
