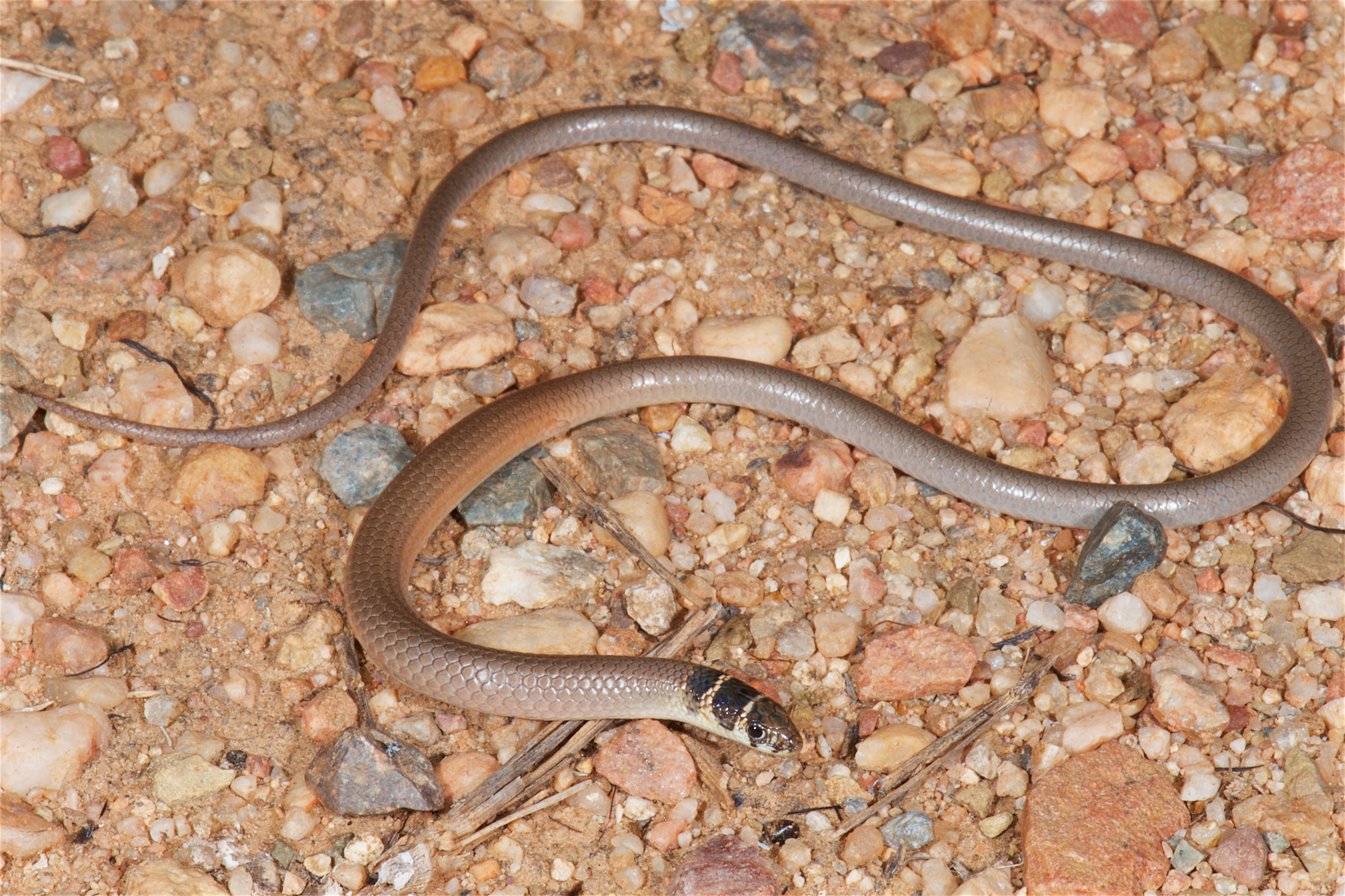
- Photograph by Stewart MacDonald

Conservation status
- Least Concern (IUCN 3.1)

Scientific classification
- Kingdom: Animalia
- Phylum: Chordata
- Class: Reptilia
- Order: Squamata
- Suborder: Gekkota
- Family: Pygopodidae
- Genus: Delma
- Species: D. tincta

Binomial name
- Delma tincta De Vis, 1888

= Excitable delma =

Species of lizard

The excitable delma (Delma tincta) is a species of lizard in the Pygopodidae family endemic to Australia. The lizard gets its name from its active and jumpy defense mechanism. It will erratically jump multiple times in succession, each jump pivoting its body in a different direction. D. tincta is a slender, long legless lizard that through evolution lost its limbs. It is found throughout Australia in a variety of habitats, and spends most of its time hiding. Due to its nocturnal nature, it is rare to spot in the wild. This legless lizard is small to moderate in size, with a tail that is three to four times its body length. The typical size of the excitable delma is 250 – 300 mm. This lizard is an insectivore and feeds on insects it finds when travelling through grass, logs, surface soil, and loose rocks. Like all pygopodids, the excitable delma is oviparous and only lays two eggs per clutch.

== Taxonomy ==
The excitable delma is officially classified as Delma tincta from 1888 by De Vis, but in 1901, Garman referred to it as Delma reticulata.

The twelve subgenera are:

- Marble-faced delma Delma australis
- Rusty-topped delma Delma borea
- Pilbara delma Delma elegans
- Fraser's delma Delma fraseri
- Delma grayii
- Striped legless lizard Delma impar
- Patternless delma Delma inornata
- Delma molleri
- Delma nasuta
- Peace delma Delma pax
- Leaden delma Delma plebeia
- Collared delma Delma torquata

== Description ==
The excitable delma looks remarkably like a snake, because through evolution, the species has completely lost its limbs. It has an extremely long and slender body with a tail that is three to four times its body length. The excitable delma's snout is also rounded in shape.

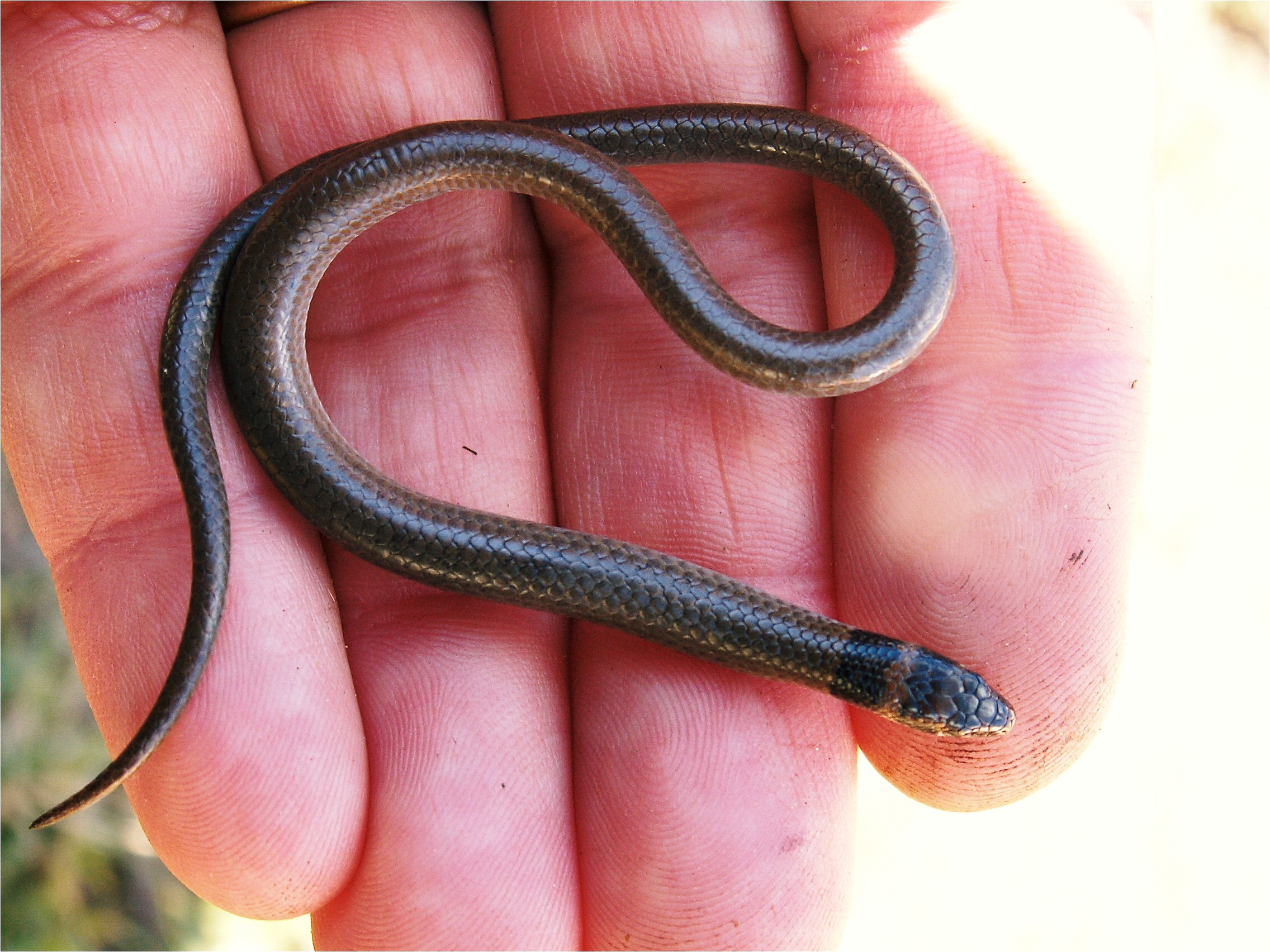
D. tincta juvenile photographed in Yarrington National Park by Michael J. Murphy

The body size from snout to vent in an adult excitable delma is about 80 to 90 mm, with a tail that extends 240 mm. Juveniles' measurements are typically 40 mm for the body and 136 mm for the tail.

They are small to moderate in size compared to the rest of the Delma genus.

The body of the excitable delma is an olive green to grey-brown colour with a white cream underbody, and consists of 14 rows of midbody scales, three subocular supralabial scales, and one pair of supranasal scales. It has three distinct black markings across the upper section of the head and neck. The black markings are intersected by four yellow bands, the first band on the muzzle, the second before the eye, the third behind the eye, and the final across the back part of the head. The markings on the excitable delma's head and neck are more dominant on the juveniles.

== Location ==
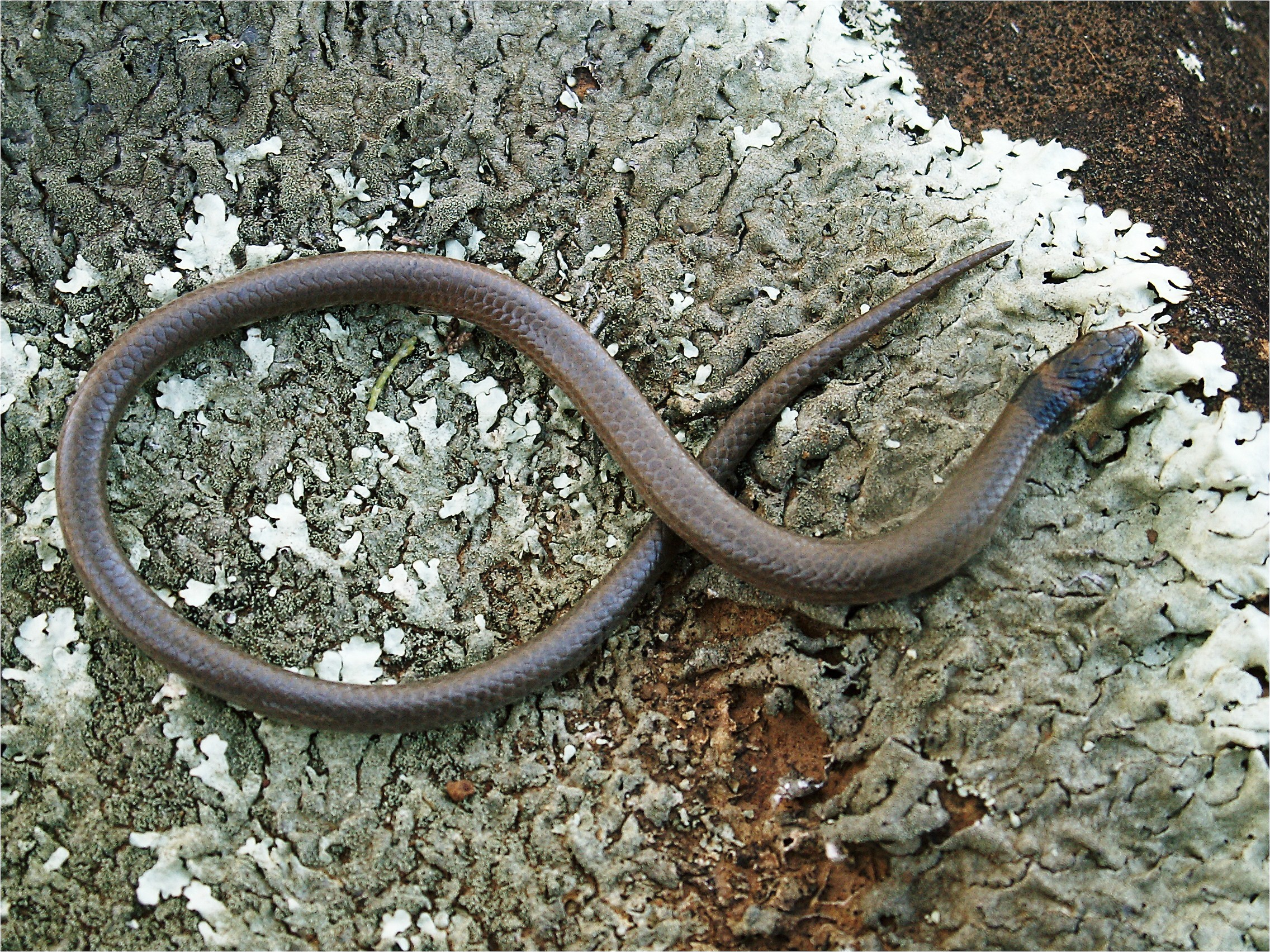
Photograph by Michael J. Murphy

Originally, the excitable delma was believed to only be located in Queensland and north-eastern New South Wales. Studies have now found this statement to be incorrect, and this legless lizard has been observed in five of the eight states and territories of Australia.

The distribution of the lizard is:

- Queensland - widespread throughout
- New South Wales - northern sections
- Northern Territory - southern two thirds
- South Australia - north-eastern corner extending across to the south-west
- Western Australia - central west to the north

An observational study by Glenn M. Shea in 1991 resulted in 10 specimens of excitable delma being reported around Australia. Seven specimens were examined in Queensland, one in New South Wales, one in a museum in Western Australia, and the last observed from Mt. Barker, which could be the one close to either Adelaide, South Australia, or Perth, Western Australia.

The excitable delma has a wide variety of habitats from dry forests and spinifex deserts to rocky outcrops. They are usually found under loose rocks, logs or similar debris, and sometimes surface layers of soil.

== Ecology ==
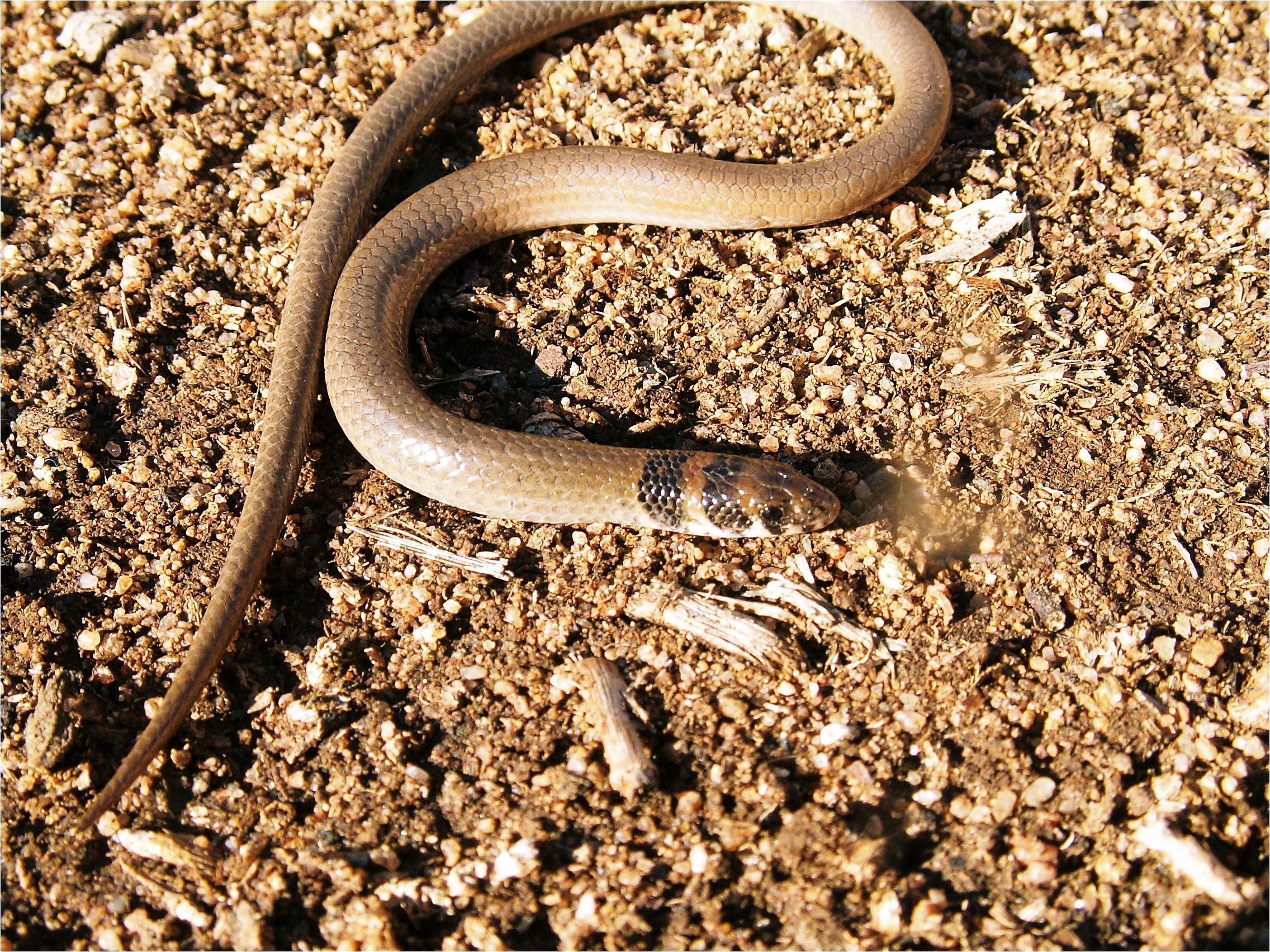
Photograph by Michael J. Murphy

The excitable delma gets its name because it is the most active species in the pygopodids. It has a unique jumping defense mechanism in which its body twists in a display of acrobatics to scare or confuse predators. When the excitable delma is agitated, it uses its long tail to generate an upward thrust, which causes its entire body to lift from the ground. When the delma leaps it erratically changes its direction with each jump. The University of California, Berkeley observed an adult excitable delma in captivity; without any stimulus, the delma was filmed jumping more than 30 times. The jumps reached heights of 11 to 15 cm and lasted 0.41 to 0.45 seconds from initial lift to impact.

The excitable delma moves through the different ecosystems it inhabits in a locomotor motion known as saltation. Saltation is common in limbless vertebrates, and in the pygopodids family is a behavioral response to predation. It can be sometimes be confused as an escape response, but this is not the function of this behaviour. Saltation is the locomotion motion of side-pushing, and the jumping in delmas allows them to move their bodies at a greater wave-speed. The locomotion movement begins in the tail, and the lizard has evolved to propel itself forward at a 45° angle.

Another defense mechanism of the species is the capability to vocalize sounds like other lizards in the pygopodids.
