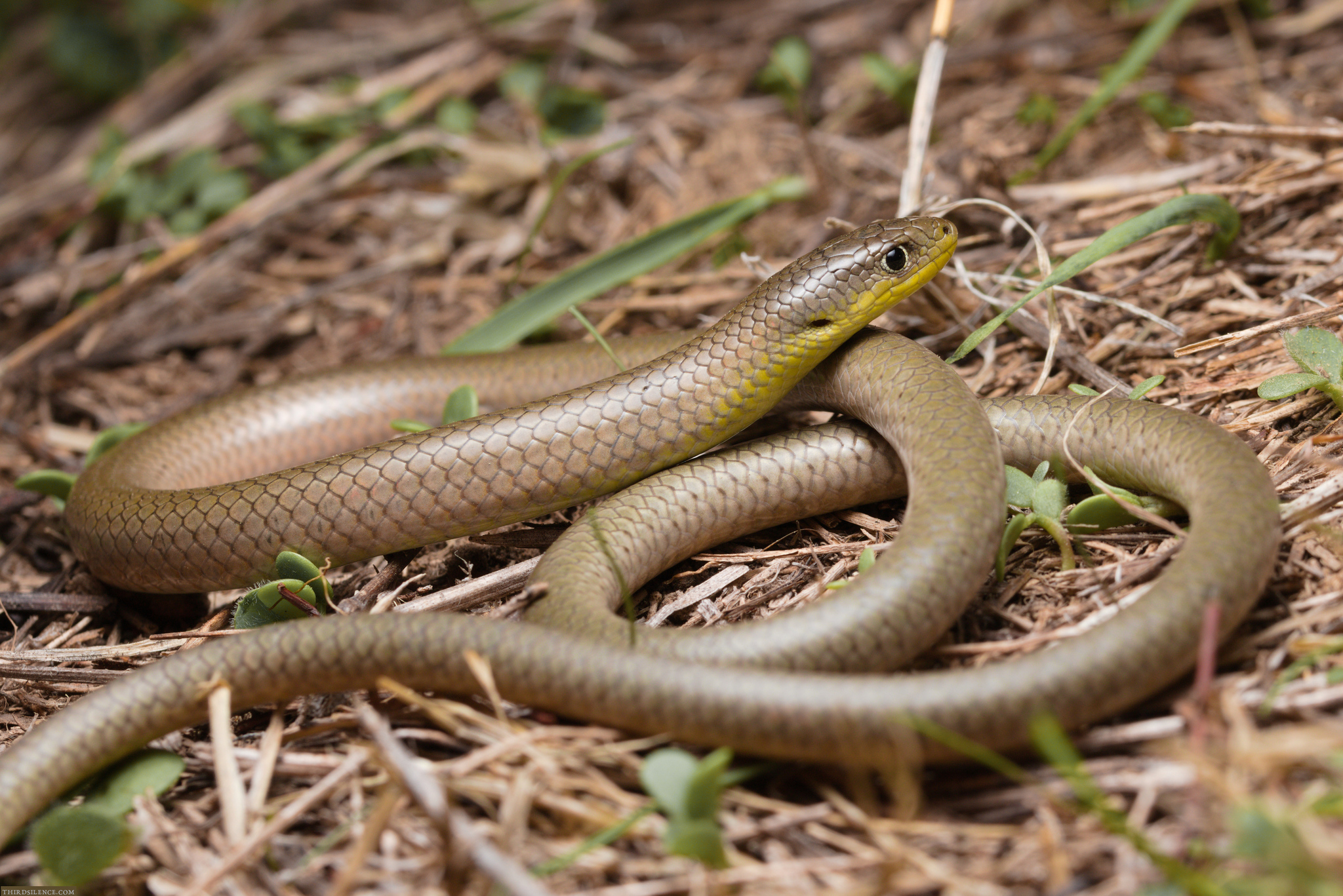
- Olive legless lizard (Delma inornata). Observed by Third Silence Nature Photography

Conservation status
- Least Concern (IUCN 3.1)

Scientific classification
- Kingdom: Animalia
- Phylum: Chordata
- Class: Reptilia
- Order: Squamata
- Suborder: Gekkota
- Family: Pygopodidae
- Genus: Delma
- Species: D. inornata

Binomial name
- Delma inornata Kluge, 1974
- Distribution of Delma inornata

= Olive legless lizard =

Species of lizard

The olive legless lizard (Delma inornata) is a species of legless gecko from the Pygopodidae family. This species is commonly found throughout the Australian Capital Territory, New South Wales, Queensland, Victoria and southeastern South Australia, mostly inhabiting areas consisting of dry to temperate southern grasslands and grassy woodlands.

== Taxonomy ==
Delma inornata is also commonly referred to as the patternless delma, olive snake-lizard, plain snake-lizard, olive delma lizard, patternless legless lizard, and common delma. The species is a member of the Pygopodidae gecko family, which consists of approximately thirty legless, snake-like species endemic to Australia, with only two species found outside of mainland Australia. These Pygododid lizards are closely related to the Diplodactylidae family of geckos. Distinguishing features include the absence of forelimbs, and replacement of hindlimbs for scaly-flaps, accompanied by snake-like, lidless eyes.

The Delma genus, described by John Edward Gray in 1831, currently contains 22 described species. This group of terrestrial legless lizards is characterised by well-developed hindlimb flaps, external ear openings and a broad, rounded tongue. Head scales are relatively symmetrical and enlarged, with body scales consisting of 20 or fewer rows.

Delma inornata has 36 chromosomes. Unlike its close relatives, its Y chromosome is much larger than its X chromosome due to the gradual accumulation of repetitive DNA sequences. The Y chromosome is also its largest chromosome.

=== Phylogeny ===
The olive legless lizard is most closely related to Delma grayii, Delma nasuta, and Delma butleri. The inornata clade, as a rule, lack the broad prominent banding of other Delma. They are also larger, and have comparatively elongate & narrow head, longer & sharper snouts, and small parietal scales. This clade is a widely geographically distributed group, and diverged from other Delma during the drying out of Australia during the Miocene (~15mya), with rapid speciation occurring between 10mya and 5mya. Indeed, the widely separated archaic members Delma grayii and Delma inornata suggest a once wider range for ancestral members of the group.

Raymond Hoser believes that populations of Delma inornata in southern New South Wales and South Australia should be separate species, but herpetologists reject his work.

== Description ==
=== Morphology ===
Delma inornata is one of the largest species of the Delma genus, with an average snout-to-vent length of 13.3 centimetres (5.2 in). The tail is typically 2-4 times the length of the body, and up to 2/3 of its total length.

The absence of a uniform pattern or unique features drove the naming of this species, as these features are often a characterizing trait of Delma. The dorsal colouration of this species is grey, grey-brown or olive brown, with specimens often sporting a yellow throat.

Delma inornata resembles Pygopus, and their gekkonid relatives, in their invertebrate-heavy diet, rounded head shape, peglike & crushing dentition and low degree of cranial kinesis. Delma inornata is better suited to a slower and more powerful bite to crush and pierce arthropod cuticles.

=== Scales ===
The smooth scales are in typically 16 rows but can range from 15-18, with ventral scales being wider than the adjacent body scales. Delma inornata is further identifiable by three enlarged pre-anal scales and 3-5 scales on the lower hindlimb flap. Scales are characterised by a dark outlining border, with ventral scales being a lighter whitish colouration. Juveniles have been observed with darker scales on top of the head.

==== South Australia ====
The population of olive legless lizard in South Australia are rare, and likely isolated from the main population in Victoria and New South Wales. For example, although 90% of olive legless lizard have 2 supranasal scales, a study of South Australian specimens revealed that 78% of individuals had 1 supranasal scale.

=== Differentiation ===
The species which most closely resembles Delma inornata, and which overlaps in distribution, is the (occasionally stripe-less) striped legless lizard, (Delma impar). The best known difference between these taxa is the fusion or partial fusion of the nasal and first supra-labial scale in Delma impar, and the clear separation of these scales in Delma inornata. However, this is inconsistent, with some specimens of Delma impar having clearly separated nasal and first supra-labial scales. Despite this, experienced workers are able to identify specimens of either species. Delma butleri has also been misidentified as Delma inornata.

==== Hemipenis ====
The hemipenis is a consistent differentiating morphology between species of Delma. The olive legless lizard has a fully extended, bi-lobed, bulb-shaped hemipenis, with poorly differentiated apical lobes. The inner lobe is larger than outer lobe and the surface is covered by bumps, with the sulcus being forked.

A moderate asymmetrical ornamentation and bi-lobed design is also found in Delma grayii, Delma butleri, and Delma nasuta. Except for Delma nausta, this group is typified by micro-ornamentation restricted to the lobes, far from the sulcus. The sulcus terminates laterally onto shallow broad sulcal pads, which are also lack ornamentation. Convergences with Delma fraseri and Delma petersoni suggest that an approximately symmetrical, bi-lobed, and relatively unornamented hemipenis may be the ancestral condition of Delma.

== Distribution ==
This species has a relatively wide distribution, spanning across much of the interior of the east coast of Australia. Delma inornata ranges from the region of Darling Downs in south-east Queensland, then extends down south, to the west of the Great Dividing Range in New South Wales to the south-east region of South Australia. There have been records of isolated populations in Northern Queensland and Central Queensland.

== Habitat ==
This species is found to inhabit dry to temperate lowland open grasslands and grassy woodlands of the southeast Australian temperate savanna in the southern portion of its distribution, whereas it occupies temperate, wetter forests alongside the ranges and slopes of the Great Dividing Range to the north of its distribution. Delma inornata frequently uses logs, rocks and surface debris for cover and protection from predators.

The olive legless lizard also occurs in farming and grazing lands, where vegetation is often cleared and therefore sparse (although native & perennial grasses should still dominate). These populations have adapted to use farming equipment such as water troughs, along with rocks, logs, metal and wooden debris for cover.

=== ACT/New South Wales ===
In southern New South Wales, the olive legless lizard was significantly more likely to be detected in areas with a simple microhabitat structure. Additionally, olive legless lizards (along with the sympatric striped legless lizards) were more likely to be detected in areas subject to moderate grazing intensity, such as in tree plantings. Tree plantings appear to have a higher abundance of olive legless lizards than fragmented habitat due to grazing exclusion and the accumulation of leaf litter and tussock-forming grass species which provide suitable cover and foraging potential.

=== South Australia ===
In the westernmost part of its range, Delma inornata is found in drier plains, woodlands, mallee and chenopod shrublands, foraging for small invertebrates in spinifex, porcupine grass and other tussock grasses. For example, in the Mount Lofty Ranges of South Australia, Delma inornata is associated with open grassy remnants without a shrub layer, with leaf litter protection on the ground, and relies on dense & low grassy feeding areas.

== Ecology ==
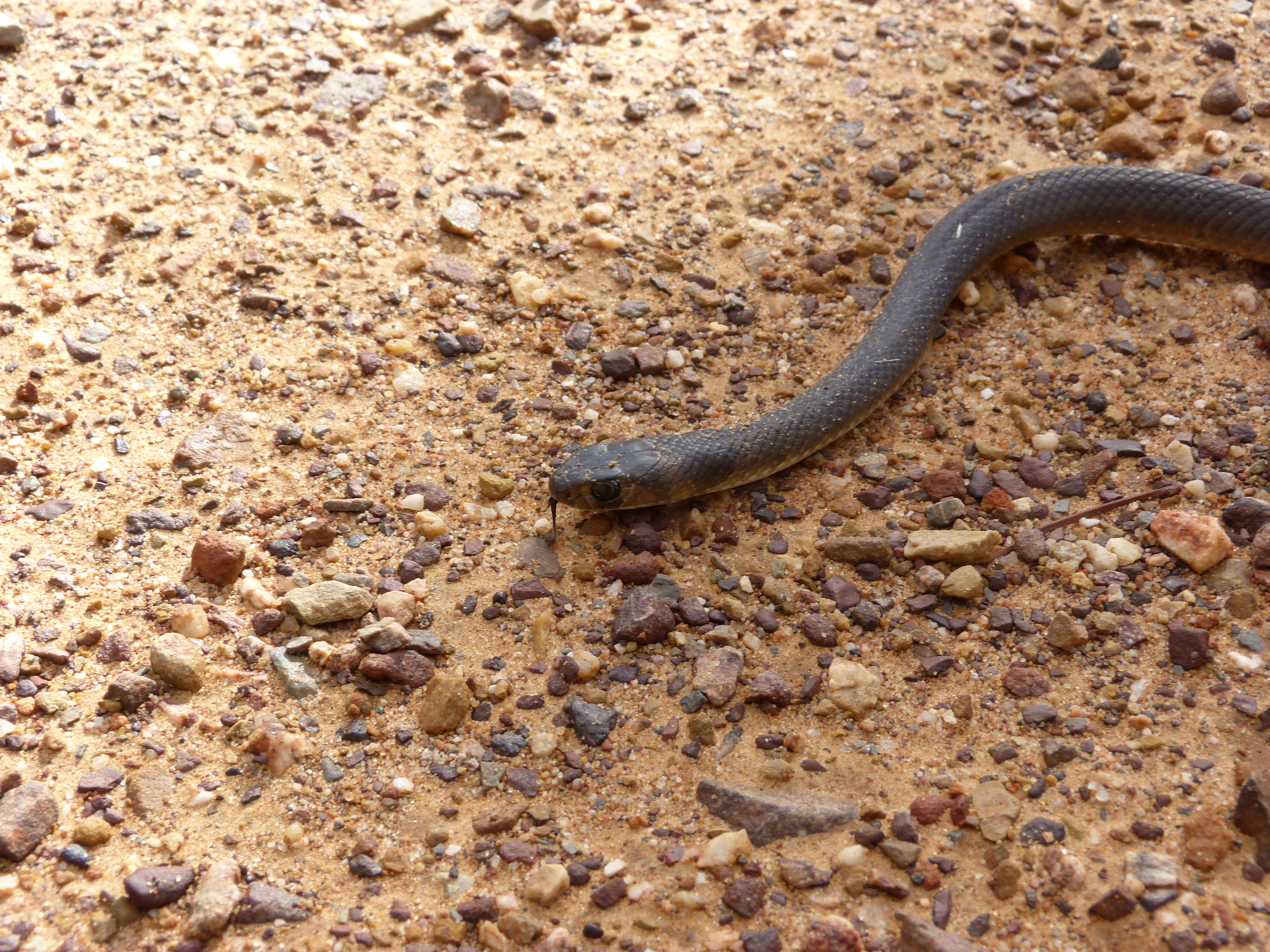
Young eastern brown snake (Pseudonaja textilis), one of several brown snake species which overlap in range with the mimicking Delma inornata.

=== Ecosystem ===
Delma inornata are most active at dusk and dawn, but also forages during the day in summer. At least in the southernly portions of its range, Delma inornata becomes dormant in the winter months, either burying itself up to 30 cm into the soil, or hiding under fallen timber or industrial litter. The species has also evolved to resemble young brown snakes, which can be highly venomous. This defensive mimicry has also induced human-caused fatalities due to this resemblance.

==== Competition with other Delma ====
Delma inornata may be replaced in mallee by the similar Delma butleri. However, there is probable sympatry with Delma molleri in South Australia, and with Delma impar in southern NSW and the ACT due to their overlapping distributions.

=== Diet ===
The diet of the olive legless lizard mainly consists of arthropods, particularly insects, with a study finding that a Delma inornata specimen had a stomach content analysis showing it contained 76% insect matter. They are found to mainly target surface active insects such as grasshoppers and adult butterflies & moths, along with cockroaches, spiders and caterpillars. A relatively small head tied with the tight jaw bone structure of this species results in a low level of cranial kinesis, meaning they are unable to attack and ingest larger prey items in comparison to species from Lialis.

==== Feeding behaviour ====
Studied Delma inornata immobilized small arthropod prey by crushing and piercing of the cuticle. Larger prey items (e.g. cockroaches) are killed or immobilized by crushing, violent shaking and beating against the ground. The lizard's broad, muscular tongue manipulates the prey between bites until the reduced prey item is swallowed.

== Reproduction ==
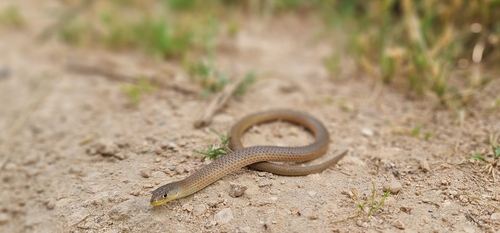
Olive legless lizard (Delma inornata)

All species of Delma are defined as oviparous. The majority of species will lay two eggs per clutch, with eggs being parchment-shelled, and elongated. Breeding occurs in the early summer season, where ideal temperatures remain consistent, although pregnant females have been found in January.

== Human interaction ==
The olive legless lizard makes a squeaking noise when disturbed or handled. In captivity, adults tend to fight each other. Captive juveniles will attack small skinks.

Although present on farming & grazing lands, and willing to tolerate moderate levels of habitat modification by humans, human-related threats include further land clearing and fragmentation, predation by feral animals, use of pesticides, habitat disruption, trampling by sheep & cattle, and humans mistaking Delma inornata for juvenile brown snakes. In particular, disturbances to its grassland & woodland habitat are causing local population declines. For example, the olive legless lizard would be one of the species most sensitive to habitat restoration in the Western Woodlands Way of New South Wales.
