= Delma vescolineata =

Scientific classification
- Kingdom: Animalia
- Phylum: Chordata
- Class: Reptilia
- Order: Squamata
- Suborder: Gekkota
- Family: Pygopodidae
- Genus: Delma
- Species: D. vescolineata

Binomial name
- Delma vescolineata Mahony, Cutajar, & Rowley, 2022

Species of lizard

Delma vescolineata, commonly known as the Hunter Valley Delma, is a species of legless gecko from the Pygopodidae family.

== Taxonomy ==
Discovered in 2012, the species is endemic to the Hunter Valley and Liverpool Plains region of New South Wales, Australia, but was believed to be either a separated population of Striped legless lizard (Delma impar), or part of the local population of Leaden Delma (Delma plebeia). DNA analyses in 2022 confirmed its status as a sister species of the Striped legless lizard. The Hunter Valley Delma can be further differentiated from the Striped legless lizard due to its barred lips, weaker stripes and subtle differences in scale and head shape.

== Distribution and habitat ==
Delma vescolineata is the only species of Delma entirely endemic to New South Wales. Like other Delma, the Hunter Valley Delma prefers open grassland habitats, living in burrows, dense grass tussocks, and under rocks.
