= Legless lizard =

Common name for a lizard without obvious legs

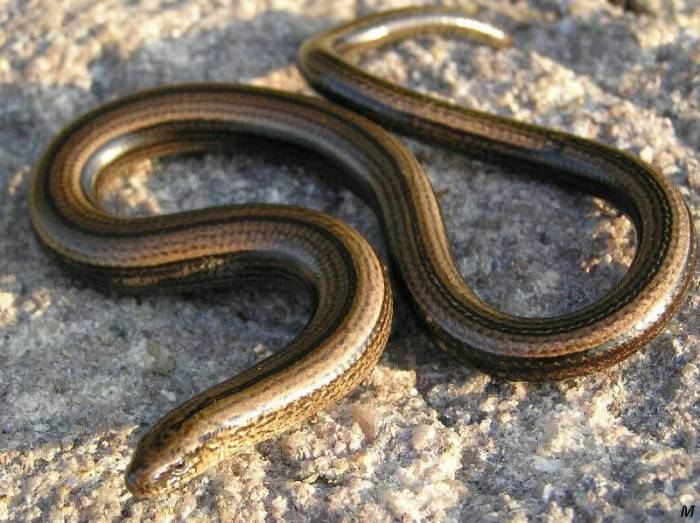
The slowworm, a legless lizard

Legless lizard may refer to any of several groups of lizards that have independently lost limbs or reduced them to the point of being of no use in locomotion. It is the common name for the family Pygopodidae. These lizards are often distinguishable from snakes on the basis of one or more of the following characteristics:

- possessing eyelids
- possessing external ear openings
- lack of broad belly scales
- notched rather than forked tongue
- having two lungs of roughly equal size (snakes have one short and one very long lung)
- having a very long tail (while snakes have a long body and short tail).

Every stage of reduction of the shoulder girdle —including complete loss— occurs among limbless squamates, but the pelvic girdle is never completely lost regardless of the degree of limb reduction or loss. At least the ilium is retained in limbless lizards and most basal snakes. Limb reduction in Squamata is also highly associated with body elongation, which is typically characterized by an increase in vertebral number.

Many families of lizards have independently evolved limblessness or greatly reduced limbs (which are presumably non-functional in locomotion), including the following examples:

- Anguinae – An entirely legless subfamily native to Europe, Asia, North America and North Africa, contains well-known species such as slow worms, glass snakes/lizards and the scheltopusik; nested within the family Anguidae, which also contains a legged subfamily called Gerrhonotinae.
- Cordylidae – an African family of 66 species, with one virtually legless genus Chamaesaura, containing five species with hindlimbs reduced to small scaly protuberances.
- Pygopodidae – all 44 species; they belong to the genera Aprasia, Delma, Lialis, Ophidiocephalus, Paradelma, Pletholax and Pygopus. All are endemic to Australia, except the two species of Lialis, which also occur in New Guinea, one of which is endemic to that island. Pygopodids are not strictly legless since, although they lack forelimbs, they possess hindlimbs that are greatly reduced to small digitless flaps, hence the often used common names of "flap-footed lizards" or "scaly-foot". The pygopodids are considered an advanced evolutionary clade of the Gekkota, which also contains six families of geckos.
- Dibamidae – all 23 species in the family, which comprises the monotypic Mexican genus Anelytropsis and the Southeast Asian genus Dibamus. All are limbless burrowers that are nearly or completely blind.
- Anniellidae – comprising the single genus Anniella, which contains six legless lizards that inhabit central / southern California and Baja California, Mexico.
- Ophiodes – a genus of legless lizard native to South America, nested within the otherwise legged galliwasps (Diploglossidae).
- Gymnophthalmidae – a large neotropical family containing many species with reduced limbs, the most extreme being the 23 species in the genus Bachia, which escape by making sudden saltatory "figure-8" flicks with the body and tail.
- Scincidae – commonly known as skinks, the largest lizard family with over 1500 species, of which many are limbless and nearly-limbless species, including (but not confined to) the genera Acontias, Feylinia, Melanoseps, Paracontias, Scelotes and Typhlosaurus from Africa, Lerista, Ophioscincus, Coeranoscincus and Anomalopus from Australia, and some species in the genera Chalcides from southern Europe and North Africa.
- Amphisbaenia – commonly known as worm lizards, comprising 201 extant species in 6 families, most of which are legless (hindlimbs always absent):
  - Amphisbaenidae
  - Bipedidae
  - Blanidae
  - Cadeidae
  - Rhineuridae
  - Trogonophidae

== See also ==
- Limbless vertebrates
