= Cape snake lizard =

There are two species of lizard named Cape snake lizard:

- Chamaesaura anguina
- Chamaesaura tenuior
