= North west Cape delma =

Conservation status
- Endangered (IUCN 3.1)

Scientific classification
- Kingdom: Animalia
- Phylum: Chordata
- Class: Reptilia
- Order: Squamata
- Suborder: Gekkota
- Family: Pygopodidae
- Genus: Delma
- Species: D. tealei

Binomial name
- Delma tealei Maryan, Aplin & Adams, 2007

Species of lizard

The North West Cape delma (Delma tealei), also known commonly as Teale's delma, is a species of lizard in the family Pygopodidae. The species is endemic to Western Australia.

== Etymology ==
The specific name, tealei, is in honor of Australian zoologist Roy Teale.

== Geographic range ==
D. tealei is found on the North West Cape peninsula in northwestern Western Australia.

== Habitat ==
The preferred natural habitats of D. tealei are grassland and rocky areas.

== Description ==
Legless and snake-like, D. tealei may attain a snout-to-vent length (SVL) of almost 9 cm (3.5 in).

== Reproduction ==
D. tealei is oviparous.
