= Slender slider =

Conservation status
- Least Concern (IUCN 3.1)

Scientific classification
- Kingdom: Animalia
- Phylum: Chordata
- Class: Reptilia
- Order: Squamata
- Suborder: Gekkota
- Family: Pygopodidae
- Genus: Pletholax
- Species: P. gracilis

Binomial name
- Pletholax gracilis (Cope, 1864)

Synonyms
- Pygopus gracilis Cope, 1864; Pletholax gracilis — Boulenger, 1885

Species of lizard

The slender slider (Pletholax gracilis) is a species of lizard in the family Pygopodidae.

== Geographic range ==
Pletholax gracilis is endemic to coastal areas of southwestern Australia.
