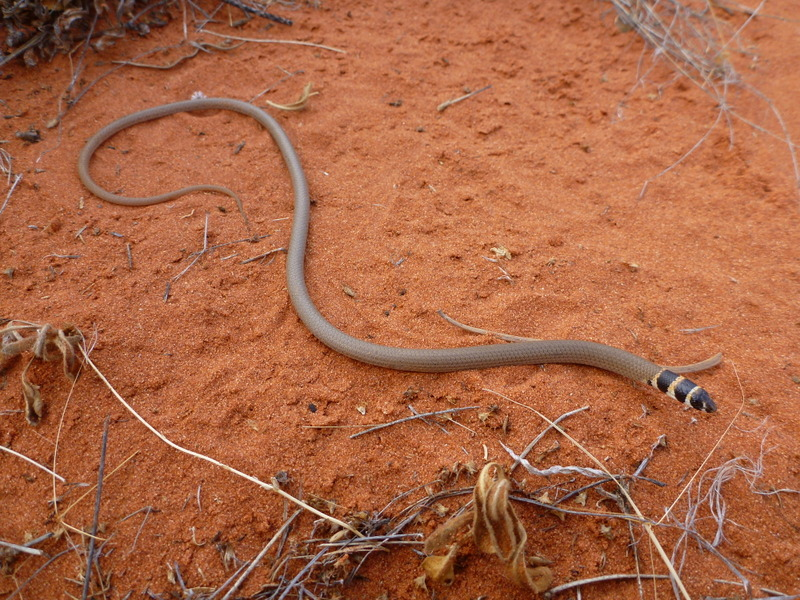

Conservation status
- Least Concern (IUCN 3.1)

Scientific classification
- Kingdom: Animalia
- Phylum: Chordata
- Class: Reptilia
- Order: Squamata
- Suborder: Gekkota
- Family: Pygopodidae
- Genus: Delma
- Species: D. desmosa

Binomial name
- Delma desmosa Maryan, Aplin, & Adams, 2007

= Desert delma =

Species of lizard

The desert delma (Delma desmosa) is a species of lizard in the family Pygopodidae endemic to Australia.
