= Heath delma =

Conservation status
- Least Concern (IUCN 3.1)

Scientific classification
- Kingdom: Animalia
- Phylum: Chordata
- Class: Reptilia
- Order: Squamata
- Suborder: Gekkota
- Family: Pygopodidae
- Genus: Delma
- Species: D. hebesa

Binomial name
- Delma hebesa Maryan, Brennan, Adams, & Aplin, 2015

Species of lizard

The heath delma (Delma hebesa) is a species of lizard in the Pygopodidae family endemic to Western Australia.
