= Javelin lizard =

Conservation status
- Least Concern (IUCN 3.1)

Scientific classification
- Kingdom: Animalia
- Phylum: Chordata
- Class: Reptilia
- Order: Squamata
- Suborder: Gekkota
- Family: Pygopodidae
- Genus: Delma
- Species: D. concinna

Binomial name
- Delma concinna Kluge, 1974

Species of lizard

The javelin lizard (Delma concinna) is a species of lizard in the Pygopodidae family endemic to Australia.
