= Pletholax edelensis =

Scientific classification
- Kingdom: Animalia
- Phylum: Chordata
- Class: Reptilia
- Order: Squamata
- Suborder: Gekkota
- Family: Pygopodidae
- Genus: Pletholax
- Species: P. edelensis

Binomial name
- Pletholax edelensis (Storr, 1978)

Species of lizard

Pletholax edelensis, the Edel land slider, is a species of lizard in the family Pygopodidae.

== Geographic range ==
Pletholax edelensis is endemic to coastal areas of western Australia.
