= Zambian grass lizard =

Conservation status
- Least Concern (IUCN 3.1)

Scientific classification
- Kingdom: Animalia
- Phylum: Chordata
- Class: Reptilia
- Order: Squamata
- Suborder: Scinciformata
- Infraorder: Scincomorpha
- Family: Cordylidae
- Genus: Chamaesaura
- Species: C. miopropus

Binomial name
- Chamaesaura miopropus Boulenger, 1895

Species of reptile

The Zambian grass lizard or Zambian snake lizard (Chamaesaura miopropus) is a species of lizard which is found in Tanzania, Zambia, Angola, and Democratic Republic of the Congo.
