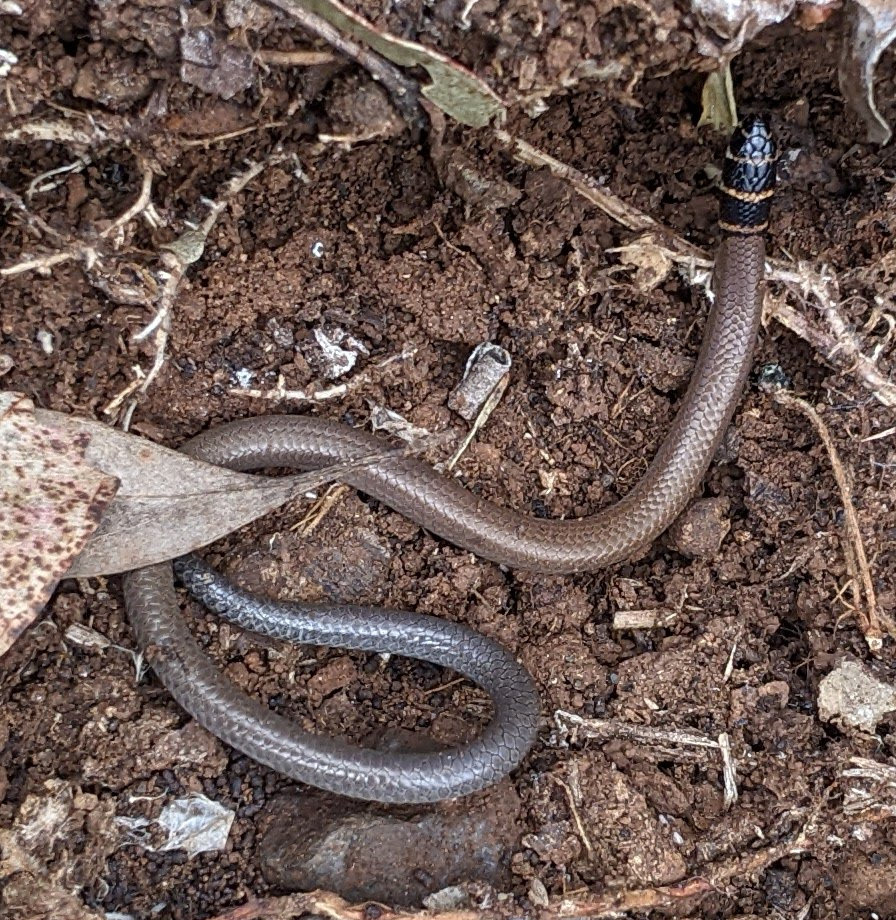

Conservation status
- Least Concern (IUCN 3.1)

Scientific classification
- Kingdom: Animalia
- Phylum: Chordata
- Class: Reptilia
- Order: Squamata
- Suborder: Gekkota
- Family: Pygopodidae
- Genus: Delma
- Species: D. torquata

Binomial name
- Delma torquata Kluge, 1974

= Collared delma =

Species of lizard

The collared delma or adorned delma (Delma torquata) is the smallest species of lizard in the Pygopodidae family endemic to Australia. Pygopopdids are legless lizards, so are commonly mistaken for snakes. They are distributed mainly across south-east Queensland and northern New South Wales, in both forests and some suburban areas. They are active during the day, seen foraging and hunting for small insects.

== Physical appearance ==
The colour of the collared delma changes between its tail, body, and head, having a bluish/grey tinge, with its body being brown while its head is black with cream/yellow, ringed interspaces. These rings are a distinctive feature of the collared delma, and it usually has one around its head and two to three rings around its neck. In size, the snout-vent length of a collared delma can range from 50 to about 70 mm, with its tail length ranging from 103 to 126 mm and having an average weight of around 2.5 g.

=== Scales ===
Like all lizards from the Pygopodidae family, the collared delma has overlapping body scales, with the collared delma having body scales in rows of 16.

== Distribution and habitat ==
=== Distribution ===
The collared delma is mostly located in the areas of south-east Queensland but they have been recorded within northern New South Wales. Due to its vulnerability, the collared delma's distribution across Queensland is highly fragmented and only found in specific areas of south-east Queensland; these fragmented habitats are extremely restricted. This fragmentation can be divided into two areas based on phylogeographical changes, costal and inland. These areas include the Bunya Mountains, Blackdown Tablelands National Park, Expedition National Park, Western Creek, near Millmerran, and Toowoomba Range. Large concentrations of the collared delma have been reported in Western Brisbane suburbs, which include Kenmore, Pinjarra Hills, Anstead, Mt Crosby, Lake Manchester, and Karana Downs.

=== Habitat ===
Within the Queensland region, collared delmas are mainly inhabitants of eucalypt and acacia heave woodlands and open forests. They have been found to prefer inhabiting west-facing ridge lines, within the midstory area of open forests under a layer of fallen leaves and loose rock.

=== Canopy ===
The species of canopy under which the collared delma resides also differ based on different area of its distribution. Within the eastern areas of its distribution, the species of canopy are silver-leaved ironbark, Moreton Bay ash, gum top box, tallowwood, and Queensland blue gum. In the areas west of Brisbane, the canopy comprises red ash and different wattles such as Brisbane wattle and the hickory wattle.

=== Grass and soil ===
No specific type of soil is preferred by the collared delma; they have been found to inhabit sandy loams, grey and black cracking clays, stony lithosols, and basalt-derived podzols. The stony lithosol soil type was mainly abundant in Mt Crosby and Moggill State Forest sites, and the Pinjarra Hills and Anstead areas consisted of podzolic soil and basalt rocks. The soil is usually covered by grasses such as kangaroo grass, barbed-wire grass, wiregrass, and Lomandra.

=== Microhabitat ===
The microhabitat of a collared delma usually consists of logs, rocks, bark, and other woody debris. The leaf litter thickness where it resides usually ranges from 30 to 100 mm.

== Ecology and behaviour ==
=== Breeding/reproduction ===
The collared delma, like all pygopodid lizards, have a breeding season in the Australian summer, producing two eggs during December, which hatch late February to early March.

=== Diet ===
The collared delma is purely insectivorous, feeding on small cockroaches and spiders. They are diurnal creatures, actively foraging during the day, and have only been observed to forage alone.

== Conservation ==
=== Endangered species ===
Under both the Environment Projection and Biodiversity Conservation Act 1999 and the Endangered Species Protection Act 1992; the collared delma is listed as vulnerable. It is also listed under the vulnerable status in both the action plan for Australian reptiles and the Queensland Nature Conservation Regulation 1994. No direct documented study or investigation has quantified its population decline. However, based on the scarcity of its sightings and the nature of its fragmented distribution, the collared delma population vulnerable to both environmental and human pressures. This include land clearing and urbanisation of its habitat, particularly in south-east Queensland. Other threats to the collared delma population include clearing of land for agriculture, habitat degradation, removal of rocks and ground litter, agricultural chemicals, predation by feral cats and foxes, and weed invasion.

=== Conservation actions ===
The disturbance and modification of collared delma habitat due to agricultural expansion and urbanisation has posed a threat at both regional and local levels. Actions taken by regional and local governments include the monitoring and protection of areas of high occurrence of collared delmas. Furthermore, road measures, such as ensuring road widening has no disturbance in its environment and restricting road routes to the public to reduce human disturbance. Governments have also discouraged the public removal of rocks in areas of potential habitat.

==== Fires ====
The overall Queensland government's fire restrictions at both a regional and local level are to preserve the habitat of all animals in the areas, including the collared delma.

==== Invasive weeds ====
Public encouragement in the identification and removal of weeds, such as the dwarf lantana in their local area, will help reduce its threat to the collared delma.
