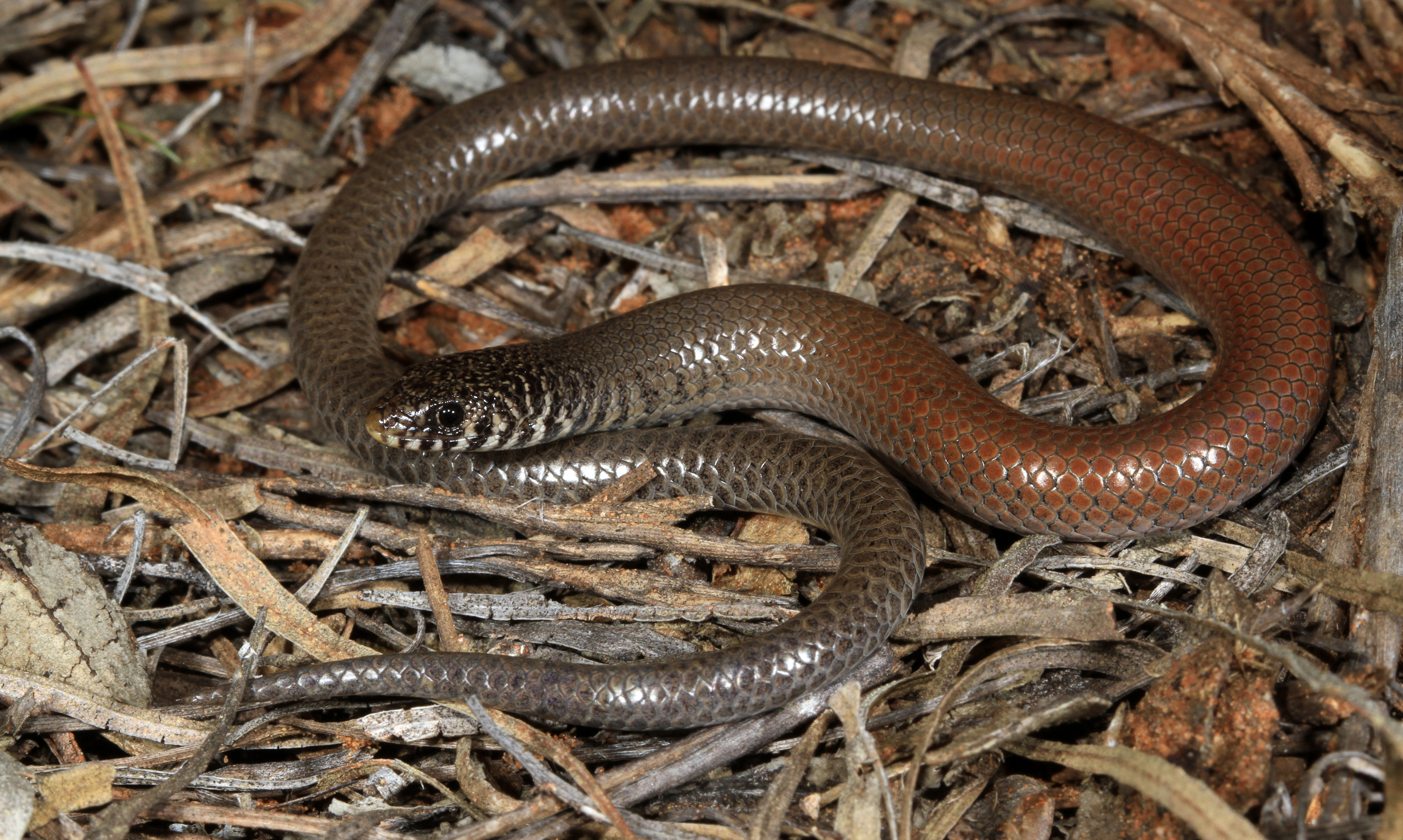

Conservation status
- Least Concern (IUCN 3.1)

Scientific classification
- Kingdom: Animalia
- Phylum: Chordata
- Class: Reptilia
- Order: Squamata
- Suborder: Gekkota
- Family: Pygopodidae
- Genus: Delma
- Species: D. australis

Binomial name
- Delma australis Kluge, 1974

= Marble-faced delma =

Species of legless lizard endemic to Australia

The Delma australis is often known as the southern legless lizard, or the marble-faced delma. This terrestrial lizard falls into the category of slender Pygopodidae, a legless lizard. There are 21 known species in the Pygopdidae family in Australia. Marble-faced delmas are endemic to Australia. Delma australis was first described by Kluge in 1974.

== Description ==
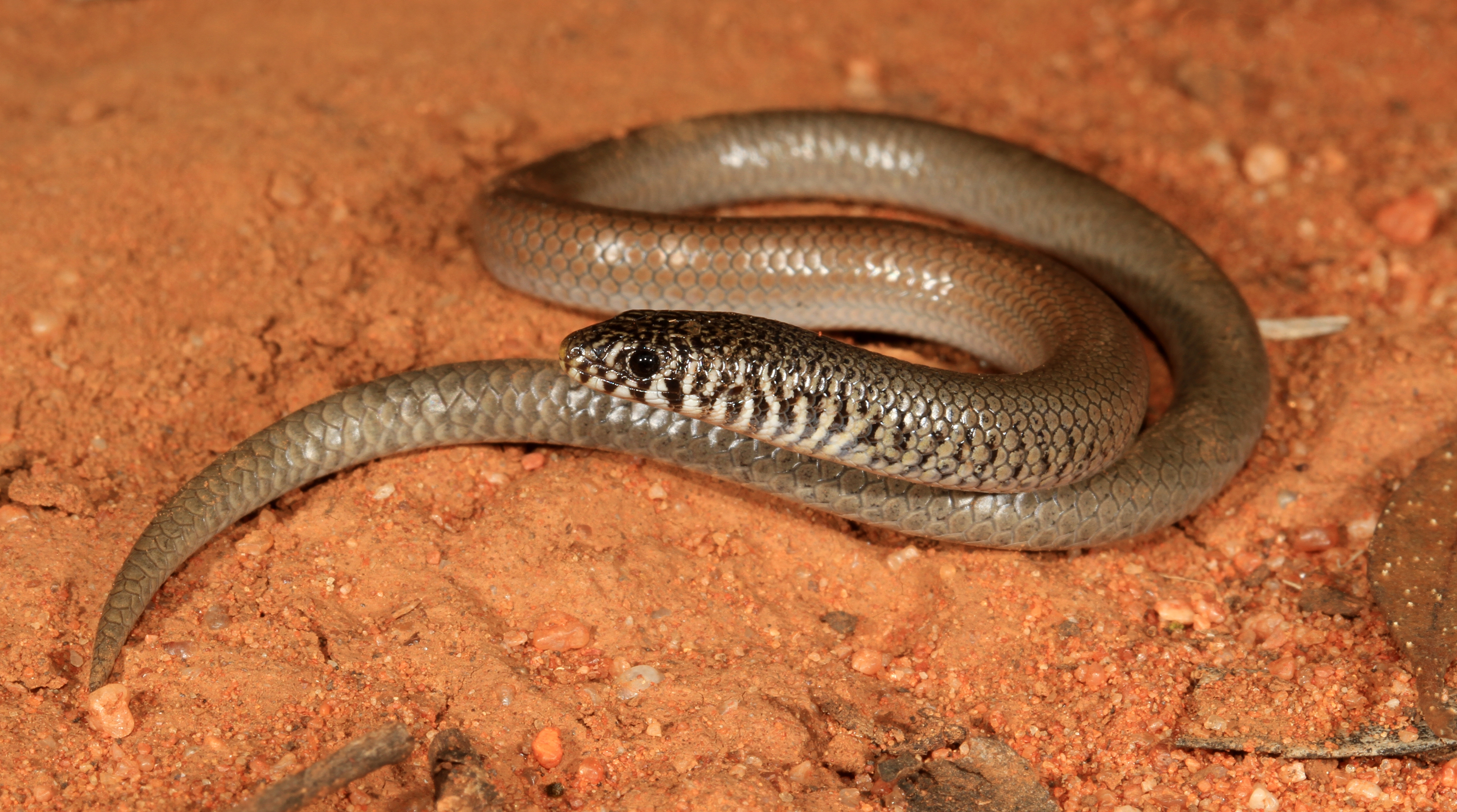
Marble-faced delma

D. australis is a brown to reddish brown colour with a greyish undersurface and greyish lips. Their common name, marble-faced delma, comes from their grey-marble appearance. Distinctive features include ventral black bars on the top and sides of head with a short and rounded snout, and a tail twice the length of their body. Geographical variation have been observed in marble-faced delma populations, the intensity of head patterning and head form can vary between populations in different areas. There has been suggestions that there are a number of sub-species of D. australis, variation was discovered in Western Australia but further sampling is needed to determine if these differences were taxonomically significant.

== Ecology ==
Marble-faced delmas are classified as diurnal, however, have been observed in active states at night or around dawn and dusk. They are often found in leaf litter, under rocks or in spinifex. Classified as terrestrial, but can successfully climb hummock grass and branches of small shrubs.

== Distribution ==
Marble-faced delmas are widely distributed across southern Australia. They are found to inhabit semi-arid to arid areas in southern Western Australia, most of South Australia, southern Northern Territory, north-west Victoria, and south-west New South Wales. They are terrestrial, or land dwelling, species that are commonly found in spinifex grass.

== Distribution in New South Wales ==
Marble-faced delma populations are known to be in the Broken Hill Complex Interim Biogeographic Regionalisation of Australia Region, in some of the sub-regions of the Cobar Peneplain Interim Biogeographic Regionalisation of Australia Region, and in sub-regions of the Murray Darling Depression Interim Biogeographic Regionalisation of Australia Region. In these areas the species in known to be within different vegetation formation and classes, including the Stony Desert Mulga Shrublands which is an Acacia sub-formation, Dune Mallee Woodlands which is a shrubby sub-formation, and Sand Plain Mallee Woodlands. These areas are arid to semi-arid warm zones.

== Reproduction ==
Marble-faced delmas reproduce sexually and are oviparous (egg layers), with a clutch size of 2. The eggs hatch after approximately 70 days. They are precocial, meaning they are hatched in an advanced state where they are able to feed themselves and independently move.

== Diet ==
Considered insectivores, they actively hunt for their food which primarily consists of insects and spiders.

== Conservation ==
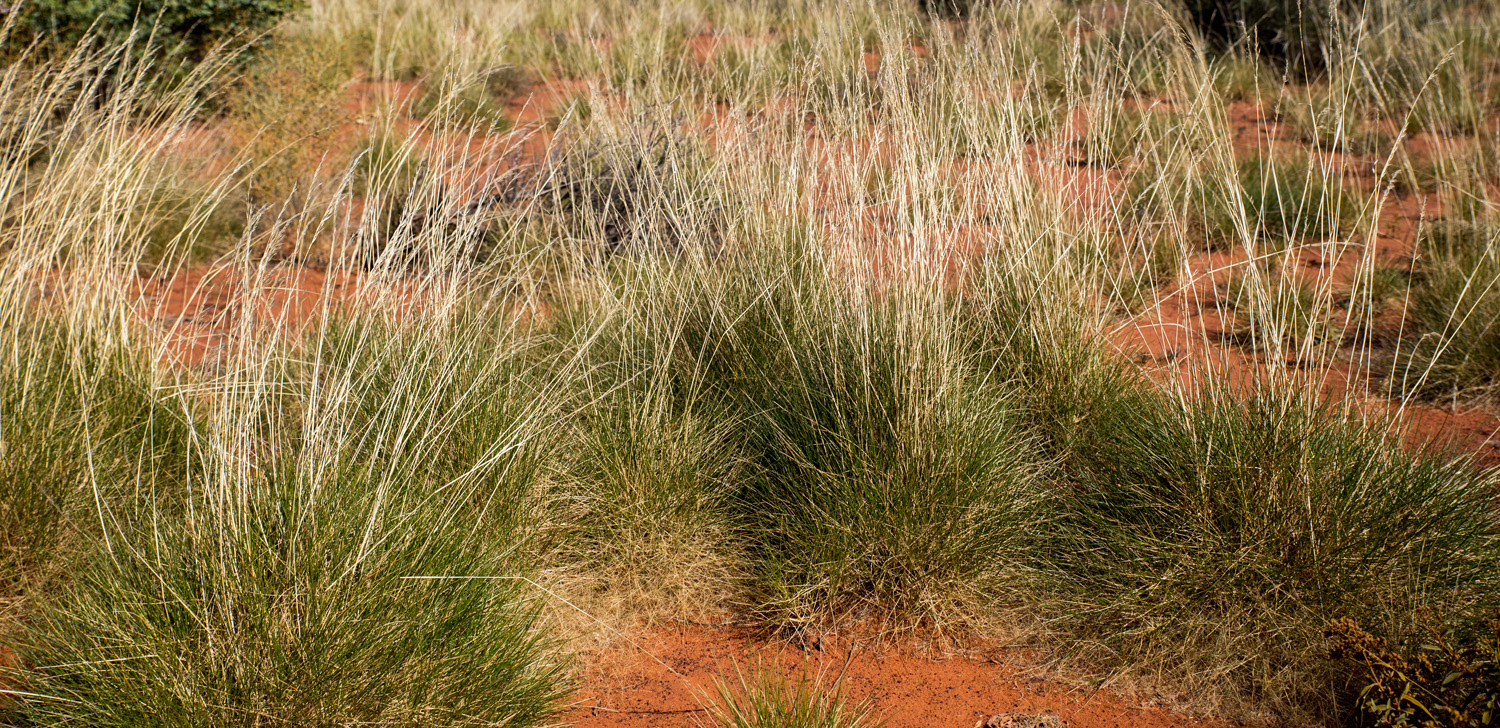
Spinifex grass variation a common habitat for Marble-faced delma

The conservation status of marble-faced delmas in New South Wales is endangered, their conservation status is not listed in the Commonwealth. Degradation of their habitat and losses in their population can be attributed to land use for agricultural purposes. Over-grazing by livestock and feral species within their habitat affects the density and structure of spinifex. Weed invasion and degradation of soil structure within the Mallee-spinifex habitat has also led to habitat loss for the Marble-faced delma populations.

== Threats ==
Threats of the marble-faced delma include: habitat clearance; an increase in fire frequencies reducing the amount of ground cover; predation; loss of leaf litter; heavy grazing and habitat trampling by stock, feral goats, rabbits and pigs.

== Predation ==
Predation is not a major threat, although it is likely foxes are a predator of the marble-faced delma.
