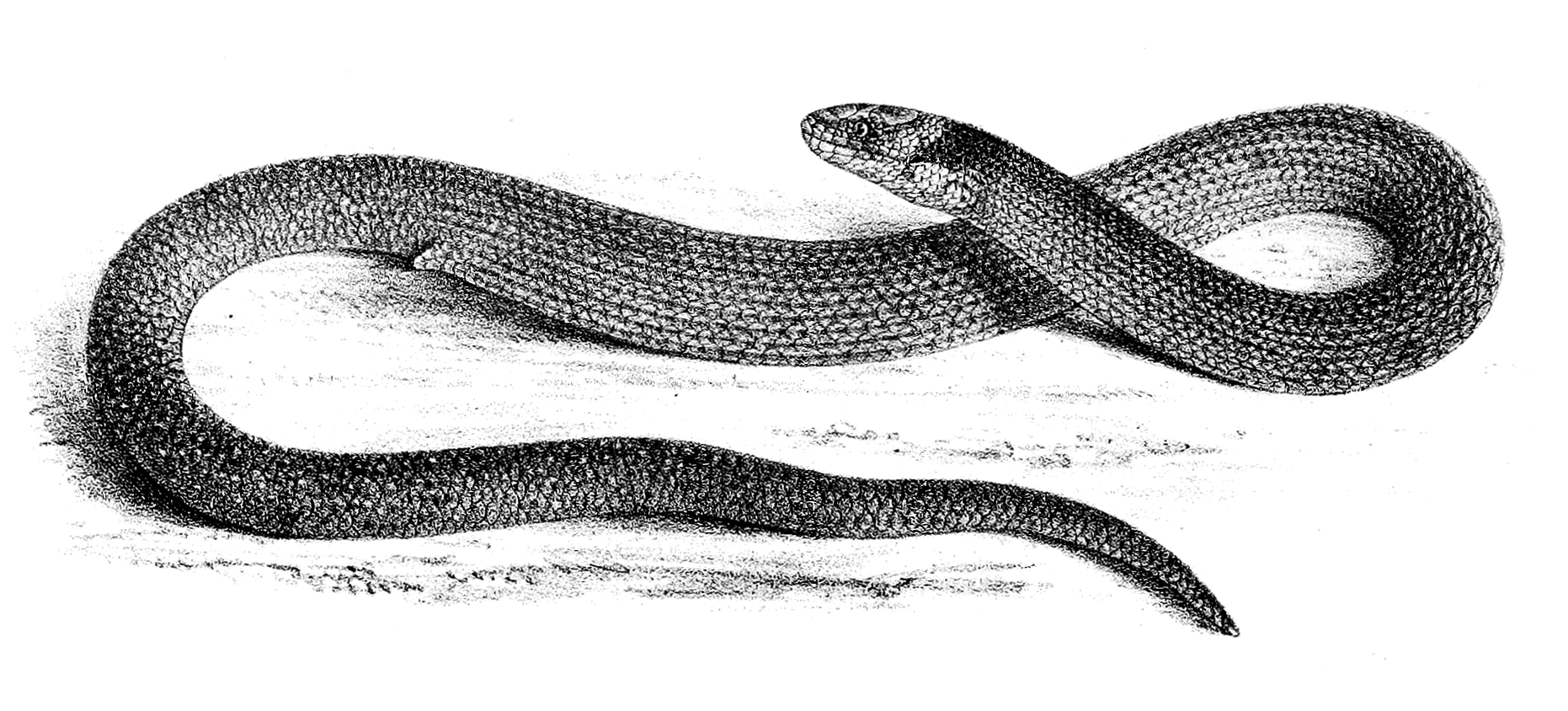

Conservation status
- Least Concern (IUCN 3.1)

Scientific classification
- Kingdom: Animalia
- Phylum: Chordata
- Class: Reptilia
- Order: Squamata
- Suborder: Gekkota
- Family: Pygopodidae
- Genus: Paradelma; Kinghorn, 1926
- Species: P. orientalis

Binomial name
- Paradelma orientalis (Günther, 1876)

= Brigalow scaly-foot =

Species of lizard

The Brigalow scaly-foot (Paradelma orientalis), also known as the Queensland snake-lizard, is a species of legless lizard in the family Pygopodidae. It is endemic to Australia and is the only species in the monotypic genus Paradelma.

As a member of the family Pygopodidae, Paradelma orientalis is a snake-like lizard with an elongated tail and no visible limbs apart from a pair of flaps equivalent to the hindlimbs of other lizards. Its body is dark brownish or greyish, with 18–20 rows of glossy scales and a subtle pale sheen. A patch of creamy coloration is present at the back of the head, followed by a black bar. Head scales are large and essentially symmetrical, and the two rows of ventral scales are wide and smooth. The nasal scales contact each other and a large ear hole is visible near the back of the head. Four preanal pores are present. The snout–vent length (to the base of the tail) is 16 cm (6.3 inches).

The species is restricted to dry woodlands and rocky escarpments in the Brigalow Belt region of southeastern Queensland. It is unusual among pygopodids in several respects. It is a nocturnal species which is typically found sheltering under rocks and fallen logs during the day. P. orientalis derive most of their food from the nutrient-rich sap of Acacia falciformis trees, which they access by climbing up the rough bark on the trunks of the trees. Their diet also includes small arthropods. They are oviparous with a clutch size of two eggs.

Paradelma orientalis is rated as Least Concern by the IUCN, as it is fairly common and widely distributed among suitable habitat. However, the Brigalow Belt ecoregion has been heavily modified by cattle grazing, agricultural development, and wildfires, as well as invasive species such as cats, pigs, and foxes. The species may be experiencing slow population decline as a result of these threats, and may have been much more abundant before the arrival of Europeans. P. orientalis was previously rated as Vulnerable by the EPBC Act until 2013, and by the IUCN until 2018. Its status was only downgraded once wider sampling established that it occurred in a larger area than previously suspected.
