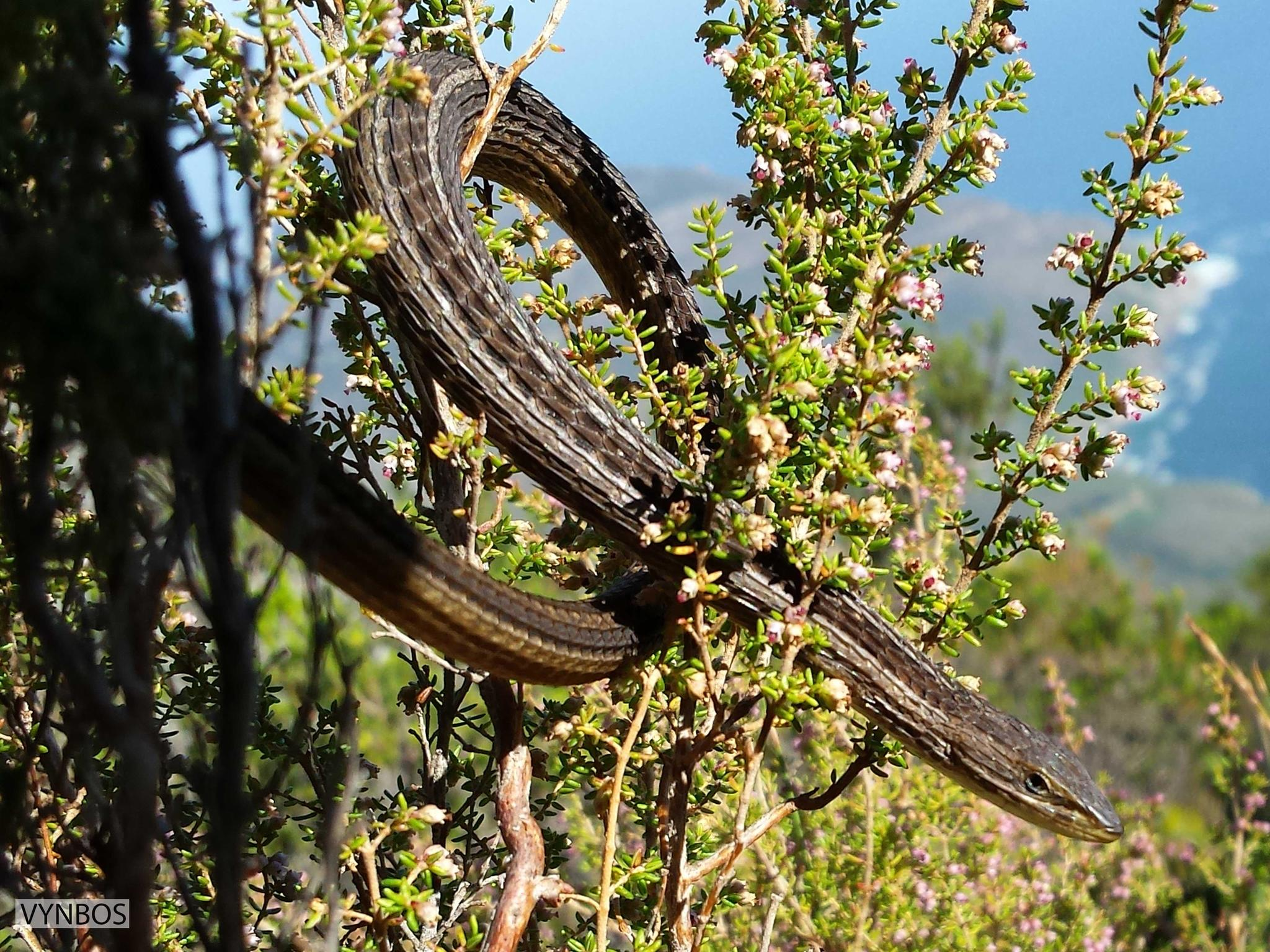

Conservation status
- Least Concern (IUCN 3.1)

Scientific classification
- Kingdom: Animalia
- Phylum: Chordata
- Class: Reptilia
- Order: Squamata
- Family: Cordylidae
- Genus: Chamaesaura
- Species: C. anguina

Binomial name
- Chamaesaura anguina (Linnaeus, 1758)

= Cape grass lizard =

Species of lizard

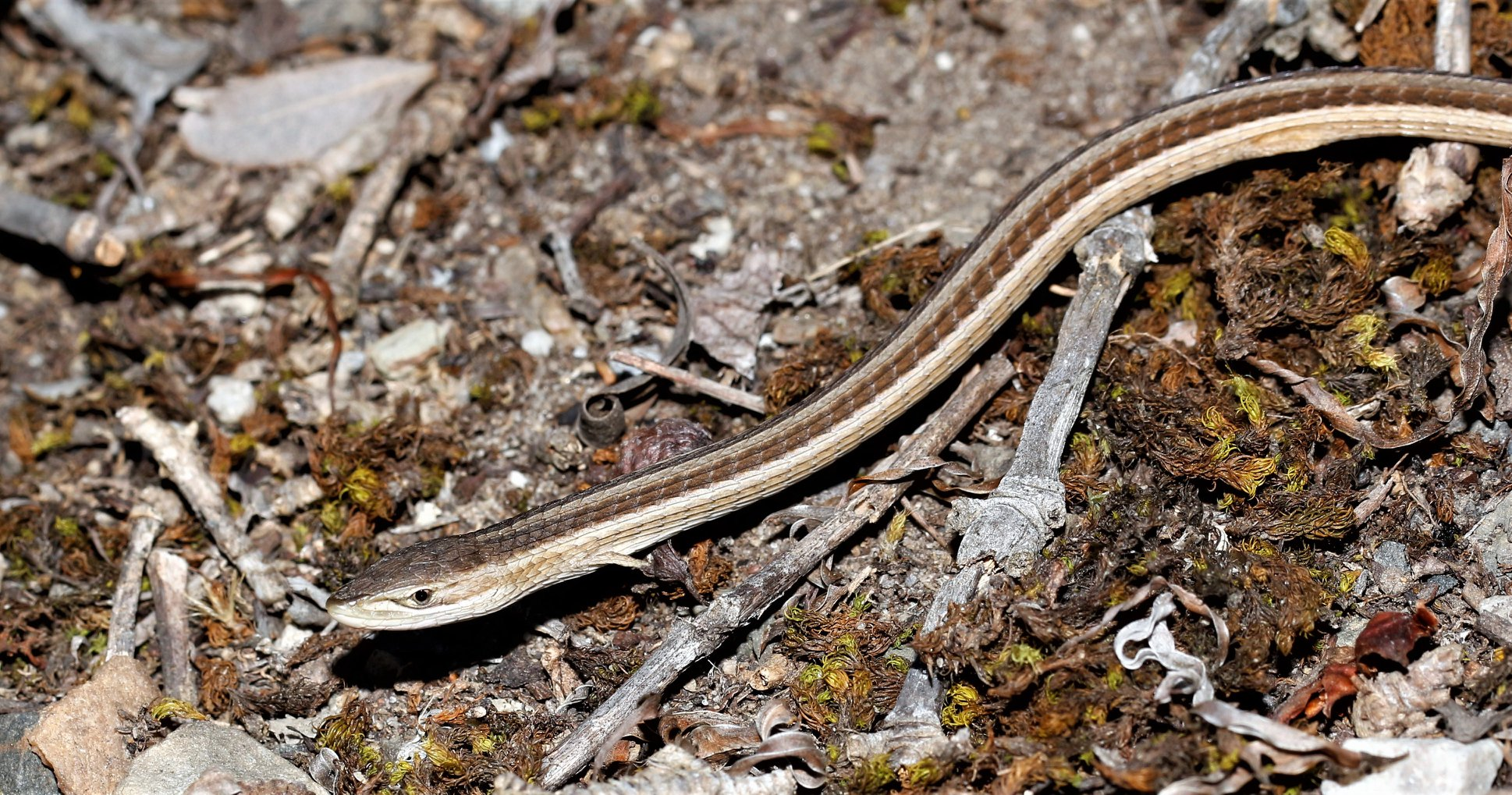

The Cape grass lizard (Chamaesaura anguina), also known as the Cape snake lizard or the highland grass lizard, is a species of lizard in the genus Chamaesaura. It widely found in southern Africa, inhabiting grasslands. In one of the countries it lives in, Eswatini, it is listed as a Near Threatened species.

The Cape grass lizard is ovoviviparous. A discovery has shown females are not breeding at the same time in a year.

This lizard has three subspecies. They are the C. a. anguina, the C. a. oligopholis, and the C. a. tenuior.

== Distribution ==
The Cape grass lizard is widely distributed throughout the grasslands of southern Africa. It has been reported in South Africa, Eswatini, Angola, Kenya, Tanzania, Mozambique, the Republic of the Congo, and Uganda. The grasslands that the Cape grass lizard inhabit are often affected by wildfires.

== Breeding ==
The Cape grass lizard is ovoviviparous, meaning eggs will stay inside the mother until they are ready to hatch. The average clutch size is three to seventeen eggs. A discovery has revealed that females are breeding throughout the year. This adaptation is probably to prevent the total loss of reproductive gain in a year due to fire.

== Subspecies ==
The Cape grass lizard has three known subspecies.

- C. a. anguina - This subspecies was first described by Carl Linnaeus in 1758.
- C. a. tenuior - In 1895, Albert C. L. G. Günther described this subspecies.
- C. a. oligopholis - Laurent described this subspecies in 1964.

== Conservation ==
The Southern African Red Data does not mention the Cape grass lizard. However, the Swaziland Red Data has the lizard listed as Near Threatened. The Transvaal grass lizard is also listed as a Near Threatened species. The IUCN lists this species as Least Concern.

== See also ==
- Chamaesaura
