= Limbless vertebrate =

Vertebrates without legs or fins

Many vertebrates are limbless, limb-reduced, or apodous, with a body plan consisting of a head and vertebral column, but no adjoining limbs such as legs or fins. Jawless fish are limbless but may have preceded the evolution of vertebrate limbs, whereas numerous reptile and amphibian lineages – and some eels and eel-like fish – independently lost their limbs. Larval amphibians, tadpoles, are also often limbless. No mammals or birds are limbless, but some feature partial limb-loss or limb reduction.

== Examples ==
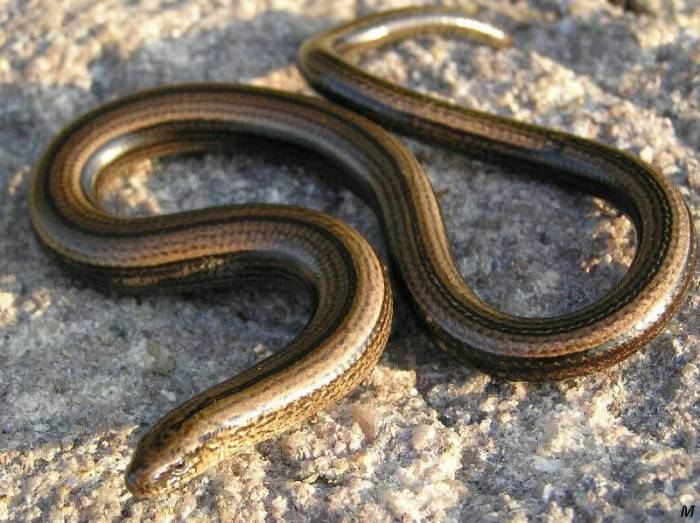
Lizards have evolved limbless forms on a number of occasions. The legless lizard shown above is known as a slowworm (Anguis fragilis).

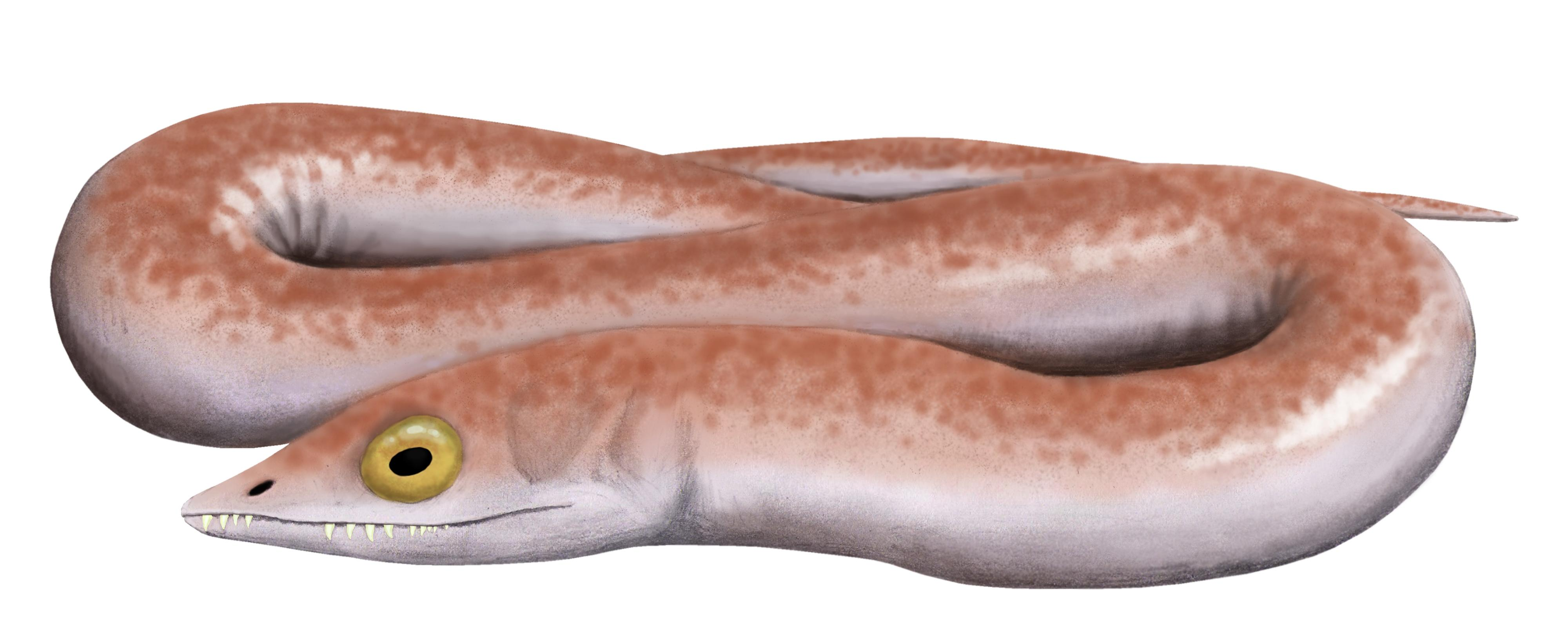
Life restoration of Phlegethontia longissima, fossil amphibians belonging to the limbless aistopods.

The jawless fish (hagfish and lamprey) do not have appendage-like fins. They may not have lost them, but rather, simply retained the form that vertebrates had before the evolution of limbs. There are also a number of fish with elongated bodies that have no fins or reduced appendage-like fins, for example eels and swamp eels.

Reptiles have on a number of occasions evolved into limbless forms – snakes, amphisbaenians, and legless lizards (limb loss in lizards has evolved independently over 26 times, examples include the families Pygopodidae and Dibamidae, the subfamily Anguinae and the genus Isopachys). Several species of legless lizards have tiny useless legs, such as pygopodids which retain rudimentary flaps. Contrarily, the worm lizard Bipes as its scientific name suggests has two stubby forelimbs which actually assist in digging similar to a mole. All other amphisbaenians have reduced or absent forelimb girdles.

Larval amphibians, tadpoles, are often limbless. Adult amphibians have also evolved limblessness multiple times – caecilians, Sirenidae (a clade of salamanders that are limbless except for atrophied front limbs), Amphiumidae (a clade of salamander with extremely atrophied limbs that appear non-functional) and at least three extinct groups (Aïstopoda, Lysorophia, and Adelospondyli).

There are no known limbless species of mammal or bird, although partial limb-loss and reduction has occurred in several groups, including whales and dolphins, sirenians, kiwi, and the extinct moa and elephant birds. The moa in particular are notable for having completely lost their wings, without even vestigial wings remaining outside their bodies. Despite its name, the finless porpoise has two fins (the name refers to the lack of a dorsal fin ridge).

== Evolution ==
Legless forms of reptiles and amphibians probably evolved so as to be able to move underground or in water more easily. Some analyses suggest that elongation and undulatory locomotion (slithering) evolved first, before limb loss. The debate about the origin of limblessness led to a temporary hypothesis about a marine origin for snakes, which is no longer favored since the discovery of snake fossils with hindlimbs.

In the case of limb loss during evolution, vestigial structures testify to this change (remains of the pelvis, rudimentary femur or spurs in boas, pythons and Typhlops). The evolutionary process of transforming quadrupedal lizards into legless forms results in three main characteristics: the regression of the limbs is carried out gradually, via the reduction in their size and the reduction in the number of phalanges or fingers; the multiplication of the vertebrae (up to 600 in some snakes) induces a lengthening and a gain in flexibility of the trunk; and the vertebral axis is homogenized from the neck to the cloaca, evoking an interminable ribcage.

== See also ==
- Anguilliformity
- Category:Animals with only two limbs
- Larvae – which describes many non-vertebrate limbless forms
- Limb development – discussion of the genetic and developmental processes affecting limb growth
- Macroevolution#Limb loss in lizards and snakes
- Snake evolution
- Terrestrial locomotion
- Undulatory locomotion
