= Painted delma =

Conservation status
- Least Concern (IUCN 3.1)

Scientific classification
- Kingdom: Animalia
- Phylum: Chordata
- Class: Reptilia
- Order: Squamata
- Suborder: Gekkota
- Family: Pygopodidae
- Genus: Delma
- Species: D. petersoni

Binomial name
- Delma petersoni Shea, 1991

Species of lizard

The painted delma (Delma petersoni) is a species of lizard in the Pygopodidae family endemic to Australia.
