= Large-scale grass lizard =

Conservation status
- Least Concern (IUCN 3.1)

Scientific classification
- Kingdom: Animalia
- Phylum: Chordata
- Class: Reptilia
- Order: Squamata
- Suborder: Scinciformata
- Infraorder: Scincomorpha
- Family: Cordylidae
- Genus: Chamaesaura
- Species: C. macrolepis

Binomial name
- Chamaesaura macrolepis Cope, 1862

Species of lizard

The large-scale grass lizard (Chamaesaura macrolepis), also known as the large-scaled snake lizard, Zambian grass lizard, or Zambian snake lizard, is a species of lizard in the genus Chamaesaura. It lives scattered across southern Africa with two subspecies.

== Distributation ==
The large-scale grass lizard lives in grasslands in South Africa, Eswatini, Tanzania, Zambia, Angola, and the Democratic Republic of the Congo.

== Subspecies ==
The large-scale grass lizard has two subspecies.

- C. m. macrolepis - This subspecies was discovered by Cope in 1862.
- C. m. miopropus - In 1894, George Albert Boulenger discovered a second subspecies.
