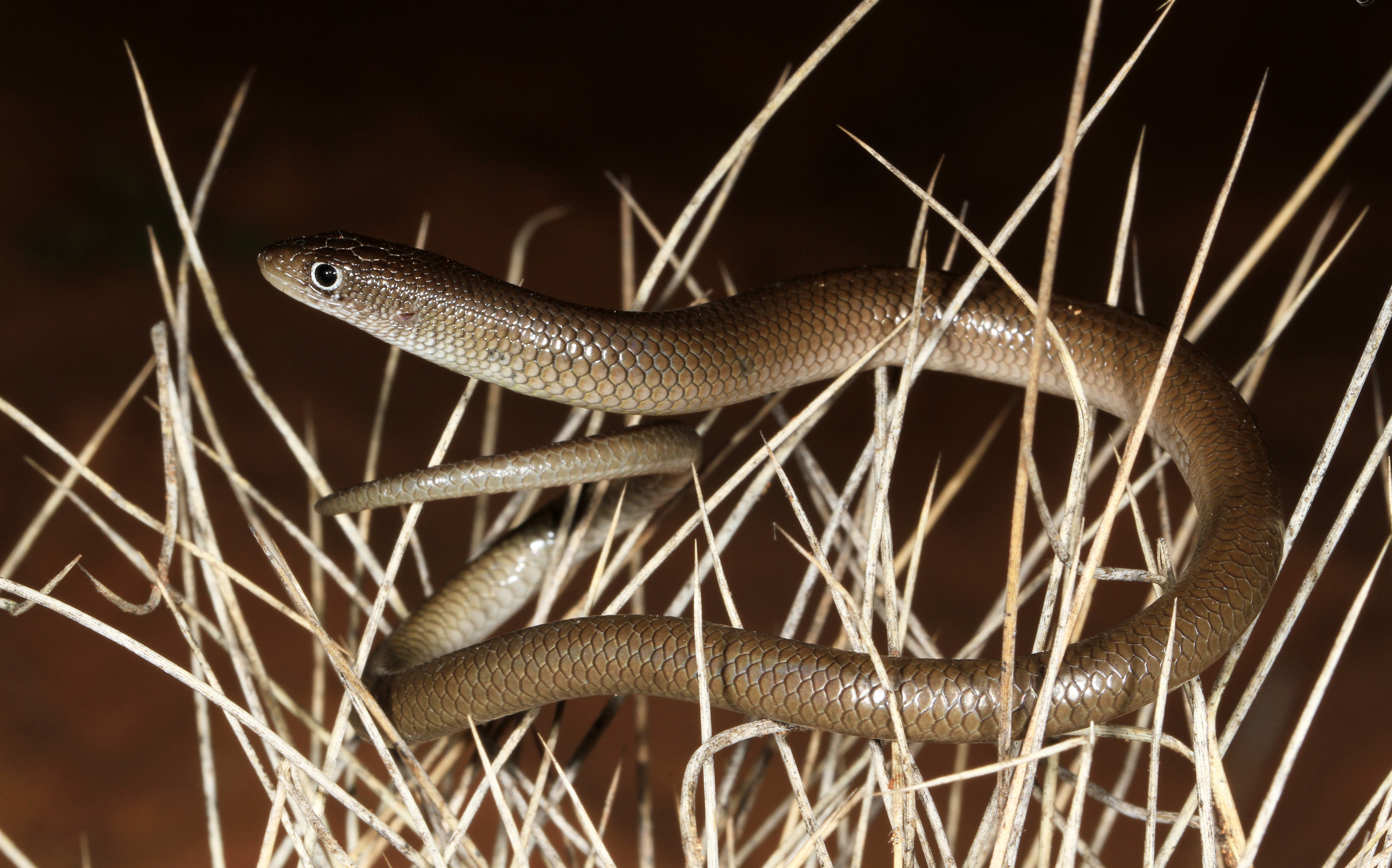

Conservation status
- Least Concern (IUCN 3.1)

Scientific classification
- Kingdom: Animalia
- Phylum: Chordata
- Class: Reptilia
- Order: Squamata
- Suborder: Gekkota
- Family: Pygopodidae
- Genus: Delma
- Species: D. butleri

Binomial name
- Delma butleri Storr, 1987

Synonyms
- Delma haroldi Storr, 1987

= Delma butleri =

Species of lizard

Delma butleri, also known commonly as Butler's legless lizard, Butler's scalyfoot, the spinifex snake-lizard, and the unbanded delma, is a species of lizard in the family Pygopodidae. The species is endemic to Australia.

== Etymology ==
The specific name, butleri, is in honor of Australian naturalist William Henry "Harry" Butler.

== Habitat ==
The preferred natural habitat of D. butleri is grassland. Populations of butleri are broadly separated by the hyperarid center of Australia across the Simpson Strzelecki Dunefields, Stony Plains, Great Victoria Desert, Finke, MacDonnell Ranges, and Nullarbor bioregions- most likely due to recent (<10 Mya) aridification.

== Description ==
Limbless and small for its genus, D. butleri may attain a snout-to-vent length (SVL) of 9 cm (3.5 in), with a tail length of three times SVL.

== Reproduction ==
D. butleri is oviparous.
