= Pletholax =

Scientific classification
- Domain: Eukaryota
- Kingdom: Animalia
- Phylum: Chordata
- Class: Reptilia
- Order: Squamata
- Infraorder: Gekkota
- Family: Pygopodidae
- Genus: Pletholax; Cope, 1864

Genus of lizards

Pletholax (Keeled Legless Lizard) is a legless lizard occurring in Western Australia.

== Species ==
Two species are recognized as being valid.

- Pletholax gracilis (Cope, 1864) - slender slider
- Pletholax edelensis (Storr, 1978) - Edel land slider

Nota bene: A binomial authority or a trinomial authority in parentheses indicates that the species or subspecies was originally described in a genus other than Pletholax.
