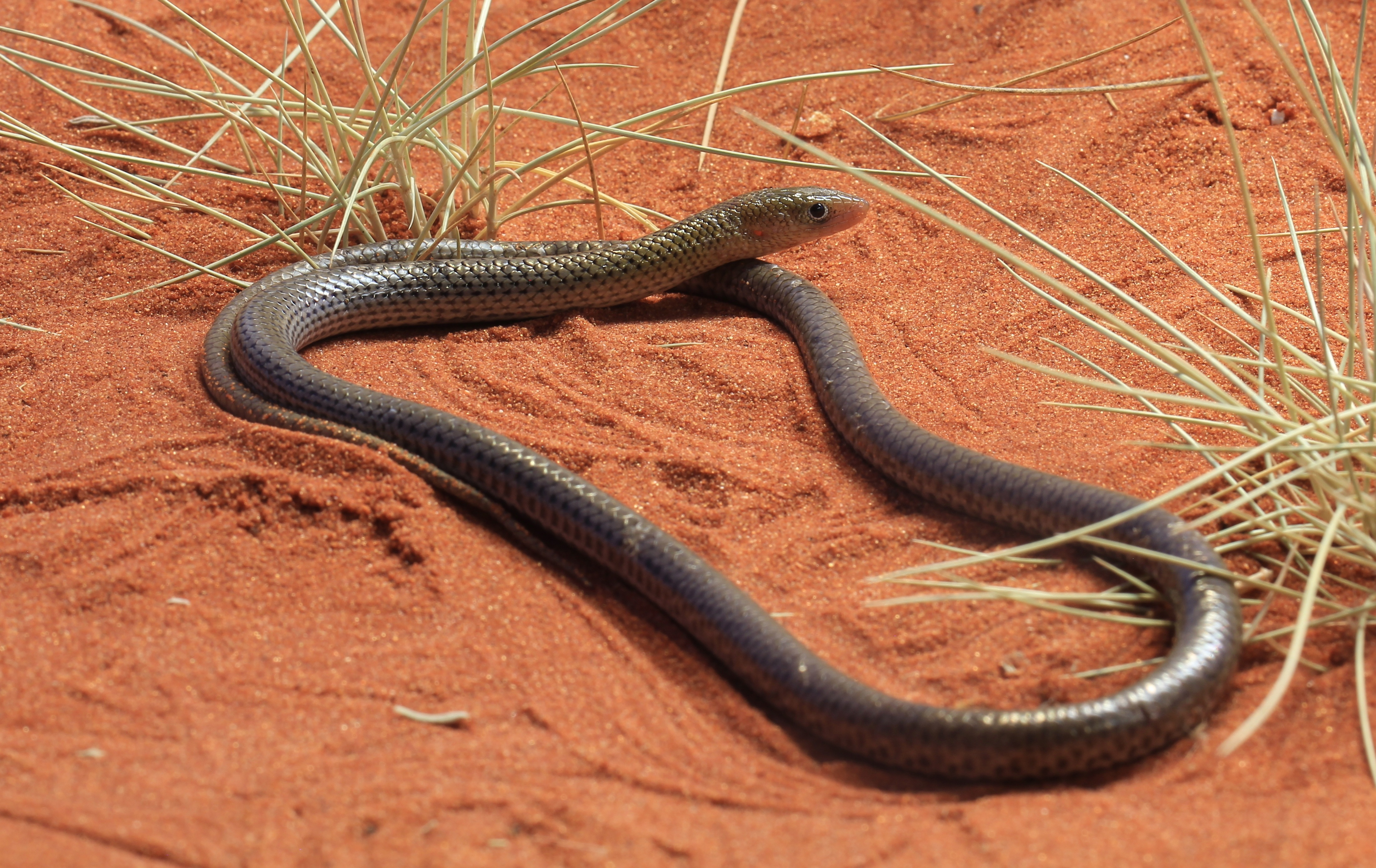

Conservation status
- Least Concern (IUCN 3.1)

Scientific classification
- Kingdom: Animalia
- Phylum: Chordata
- Class: Reptilia
- Order: Squamata
- Suborder: Gekkota
- Family: Pygopodidae
- Genus: Delma
- Species: D. nasuta

Binomial name
- Delma nasuta Kluge, 1974

= Delma nasuta =

Species of lizard

Delma nasuta, also known as sharp-snouted delma or sharp-snouted legless lizard, is a species of lizard in the family Pygopodidae endemic to Australia.

== Distribution ==
The range of Delma nasuta extends from Shark Bay in Western Australia, across the northern portion of the continent and into western Queensland. Delma nasuta exhibits a substantial amount of variation across its distribution in WA.
