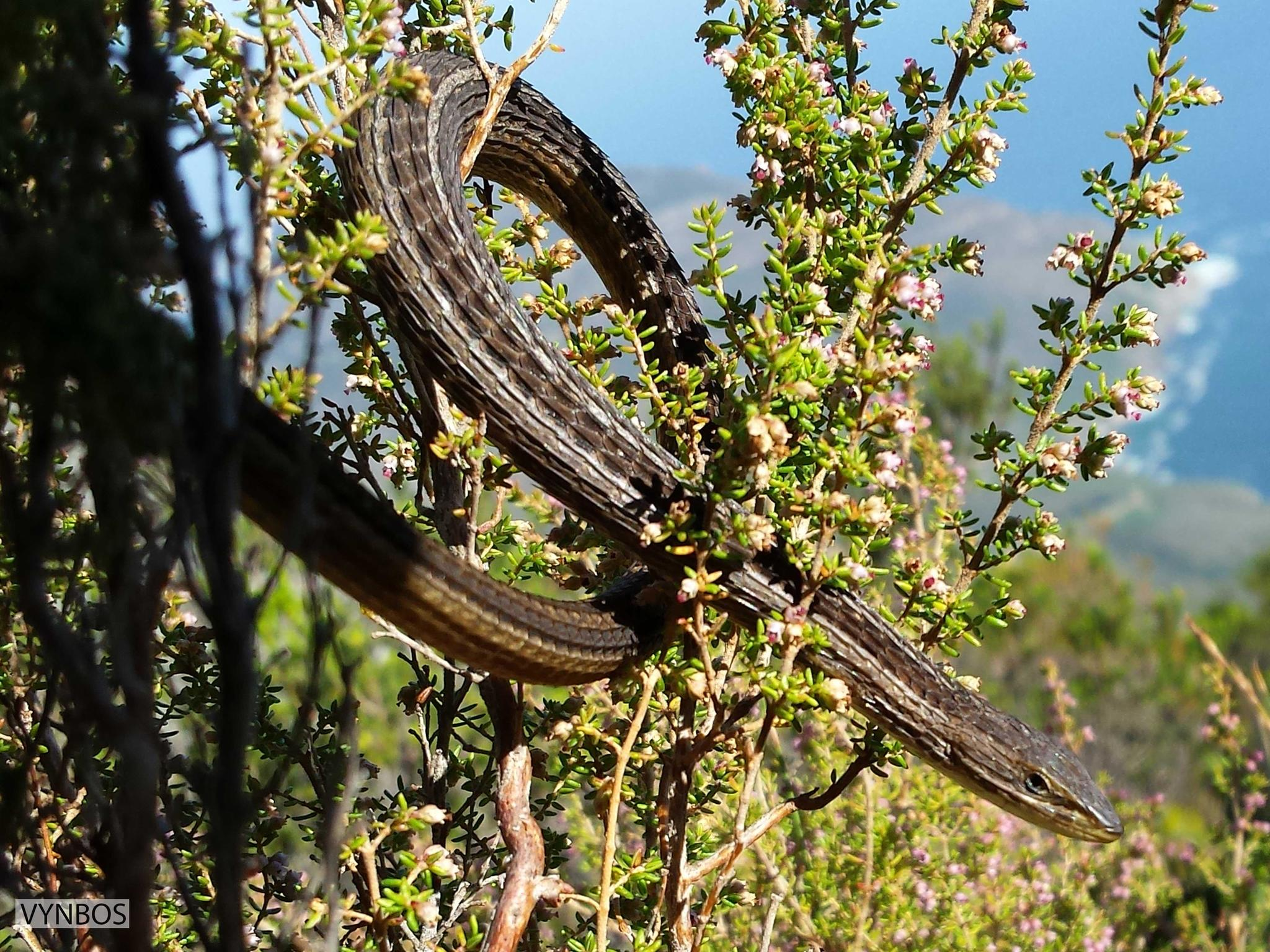
- Chamaesaura anguina

Scientific classification
- Domain: Eukaryota
- Kingdom: Animalia
- Phylum: Chordata
- Class: Reptilia
- Order: Squamata
- Family: Cordylidae
- Genus: Chamaesaura; Schneider, 1801

= Chamaesaura =

Genus of lizards

The Chamaesaura, also known as grass lizards, are a genus of legless lizards from southern and eastern Africa. The limbs are reduced to small spikes. Chamaesaura propel themselves like snakes, pushing against contact points in the environment, such as rocks, plants and irregularities in the soil. They are viviparous and eat small invertebrates, especially grasshoppers.

== Species ==
- Chamaesaura aenea (Fitzinger, 1843) – coppery grass lizard, Transvaal snake lizard
- Chamaesaura anguina Linnaeus, 1758 – Cape grass lizard, Cape snake lizard
- Chamaesaura macrolepis (Cope, 1862) – large-scale grass lizard, large-scale snake lizard
- Chamaesaura miopropus Boulenger, 1895 – Zambian snake lizard, Zambian grass lizard
- Chamaesaura tenuior Günther, 1895 – Cape snake lizard
