= Delma molleri =

Conservation status
- Least Concern (IUCN 3.1)

Scientific classification
- Kingdom: Animalia
- Phylum: Chordata
- Class: Reptilia
- Order: Squamata
- Suborder: Gekkota
- Family: Pygopodidae
- Genus: Delma
- Species: D. molleri

Binomial name
- Delma molleri Lütken, 1863
- Range of Delma molleri in Australia.

Species of lizard

Delma molleri, also commonly known as the Gulfs delma and the Adelaide delma, is a species of lizard in the family Pygopodidae. The species is endemic to the Australian state of South Australia.

== Description ==
Delma molleri is a small, limbless lizard. The snout-to-vent length (SVL) of the largest specimen measured 111 mm (4.4 in).

== Geographic distribution ==
Delma molleri is found in southern South Australia around the Adelaide Hills, and is relatively abundant in Adelaide suburbs.

== Habitat ==
Delma molleri has been recorded from a variety of habitats ranging from grassland to woodland beneath rocks, timber, and rubbish. The species is oviparous.

== Genome ==
The nucleotide (DNA/RNA) and protein sequences of Delma molleri have been sourced through the European Nucleotide Archive (ENA) and Universal Protein Resource (UniProt) databases. The identification of the species as an Australian-dwelling organism has been achieved by accessing the Australian Plant Census (APC) and the Australian Faunal Directory (AFD) through the Atlas of Living Australia.

== Etymology ==
The specific name, molleri, is in honor of Danish ship's captain Möller who brought the holotype from Australia.
