= Fraser's delma =

Conservation status
- Least Concern (IUCN 3.1)

Scientific classification
- Kingdom: Animalia
- Phylum: Chordata
- Class: Reptilia
- Order: Squamata
- Suborder: Gekkota
- Family: Pygopodidae
- Genus: Delma
- Species: D. fraseri

Binomial name
- Delma fraseri Gray, 1831

Species of lizard

Fraser's delma (Delma fraseri), also known commonly as Fraser's scalyfoot, is a species of lizard in the family Pygopodidae. The species is endemic to the state of Western Australia.

== Etymology ==
The specific name, fraseri, is in honor of Australian botanist Charles Fraser.

== Habitat ==
D. fraseri is found in a variety of habitats including forest, shrubland, grassland, and rocky areas.

== Reproduction ==
D. fraseri is oviparous.
