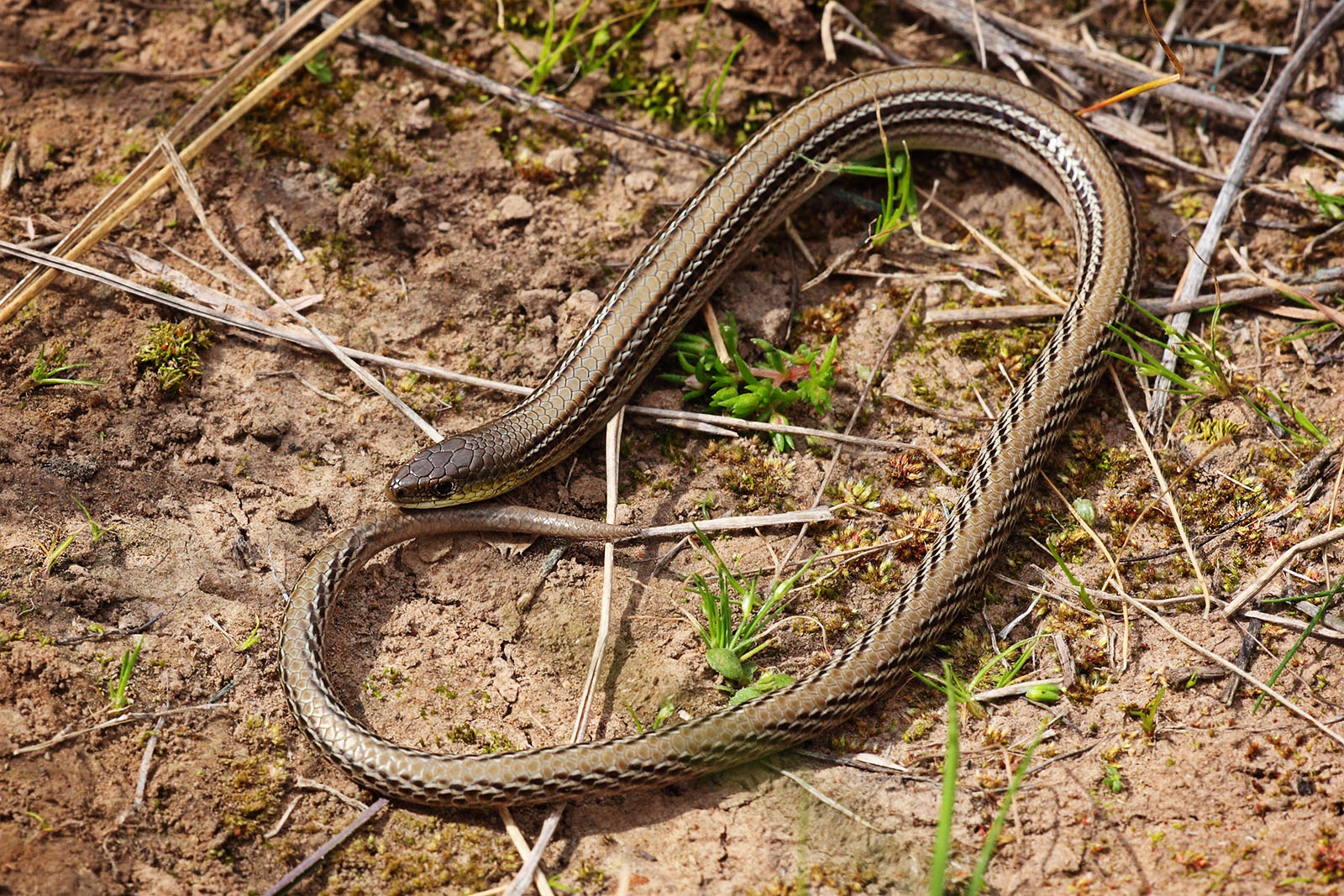
- Striped legless lizard (Delma impar)

Scientific classification
- Kingdom: Animalia
- Phylum: Chordata
- Class: Reptilia
- Order: Squamata
- Suborder: Gekkota
- Family: Pygopodidae
- Genus: Delma; Gray, 1831

Species
- 22 recognized species, see article.

= Delma =

Genus of lizards

Delma is a genus of lizards in the family Pygopodidae. The genus Delma contains 22 valid described species, all of which are endemic to Australia.

== Species ==
Recognized species of Delma according to the Reptile Database:

- Delma australis Kluge, 1974 – marble-faced delma
- Delma borea Kluge, 1974 – rusty-topped delma
- Delma butleri Storr, 1987 – Butler's legless lizard, Butler's scalyfoot, spinifex snake-lizard, unbanded delma
- Delma concinna (Kluge, 1974) – javelin lizard
- Delma desmosa Maryan, Aplin & Adams, 2007 – desert delma
- Delma elegans Kluge, 1974 – Pilbara delma
- Delma fraseri Gray, 1831 – Fraser's delma, Fraser's scalyfoot
- Delma grayii A. Smith, 1849 – side-barred delma, Gray's legless lizard
- Delma hebesa Maryan, Brennan, Adams & Aplin, 2015 – heath delma
- Delma impar (Fischer, 1882) – striped legless lizard
- Delma inornata Kluge, 1974 – patternless delma, olive legless lizard, olive snake-lizard
- Delma labialis Shea, 1987 – striped-tailed delma, single-striped delma
- Delma mitella Shea, 1987 – Atherton delma
- Delma molleri Lütken, 1863 – Gulfs delma, Adelaide delma
- Delma nasuta Kluge, 1974 – sharp-snouted delma, sharp-snouted legless lizard
- Delma pax Kluge, 1974 – peace delma
- Delma petersoni Shea, 1991 – painted delma
- Delma plebeia De Vis, 1888 – leaden delma
- Delma tealei Maryan, Aplin & Adams, 2007 – North West Cape delma, Teale's delma
- Delma tincta De Vis, 1888 – excitable delma
- Delma torquata Kluge, 1974 – collared delma, adorned delma
- Delma vescolineata Mahony, Cutajar & Rowley, 2022 - Hunter Valley delma

Nota bene: A binomial authority in parentheses indicates that the species was originally described in a genus other than Delma.
