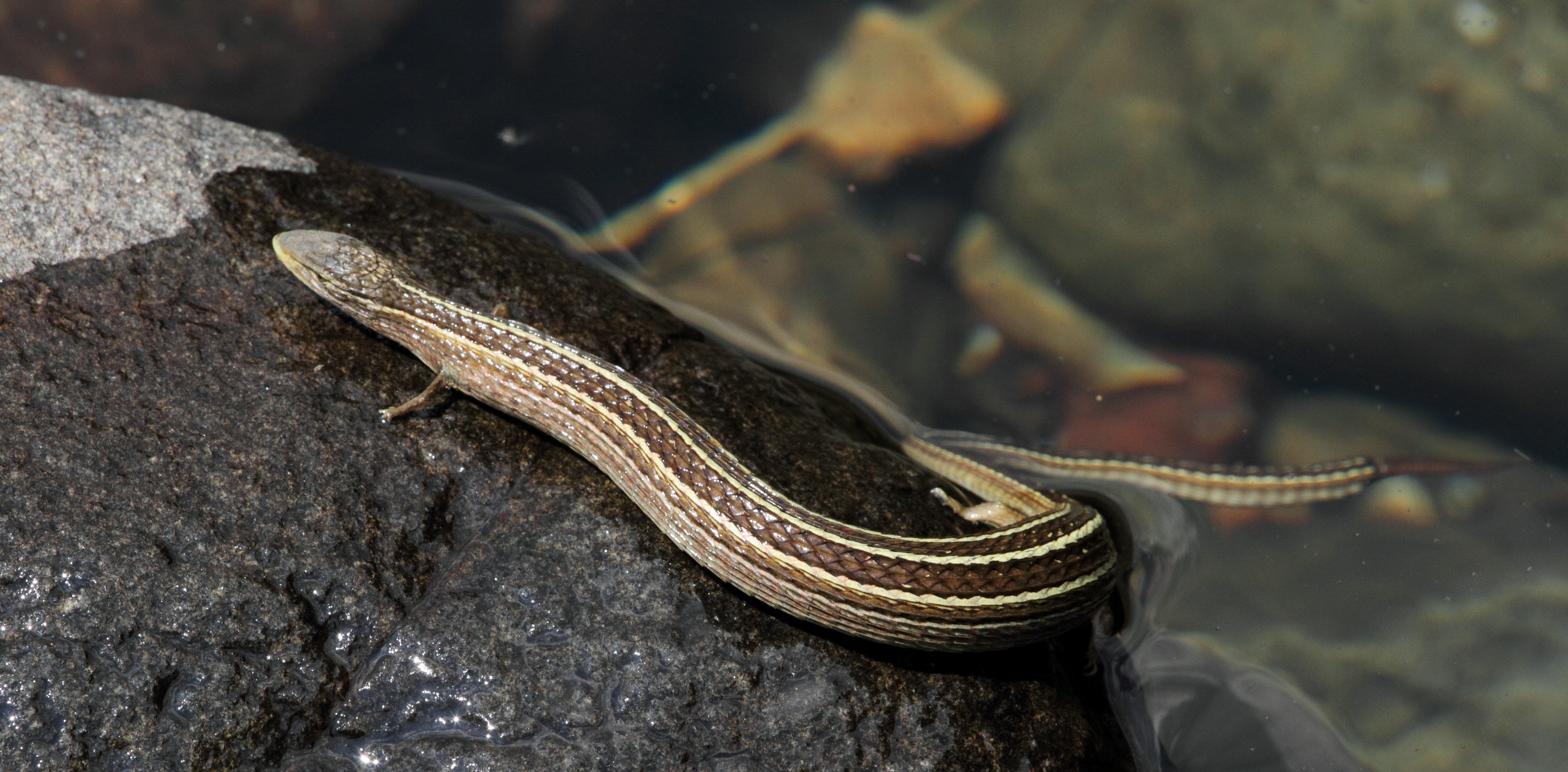

Conservation status
- Near Threatened (IUCN 3.1)

Scientific classification
- Kingdom: Animalia
- Phylum: Chordata
- Class: Reptilia
- Order: Squamata
- Suborder: Scinciformata
- Infraorder: Scincomorpha
- Family: Cordylidae
- Genus: Chamaesaura
- Species: C. aenea

Binomial name
- Chamaesaura aenea Fitzinger, 1843

= Transvaal grass lizard =

Species of lizard

The Transvaal grass lizard, also known as the coppery grass lizard and Transvaal snake lizard (Chamaesaura aenea) is a species of lizard in the genus Chamaesaura. It is found in southern African grasslands and on slopes. The Transvaal grass lizard is ovoviviparous. The scientific name refers to its copper colour.

It was first described in 1843 by Fitzinger (who named it Cricochalcis aenea), based on specimens at the Natural History Museum in Berlin that were collected in South Africa by Ludwig Krebs.

== Distribution ==
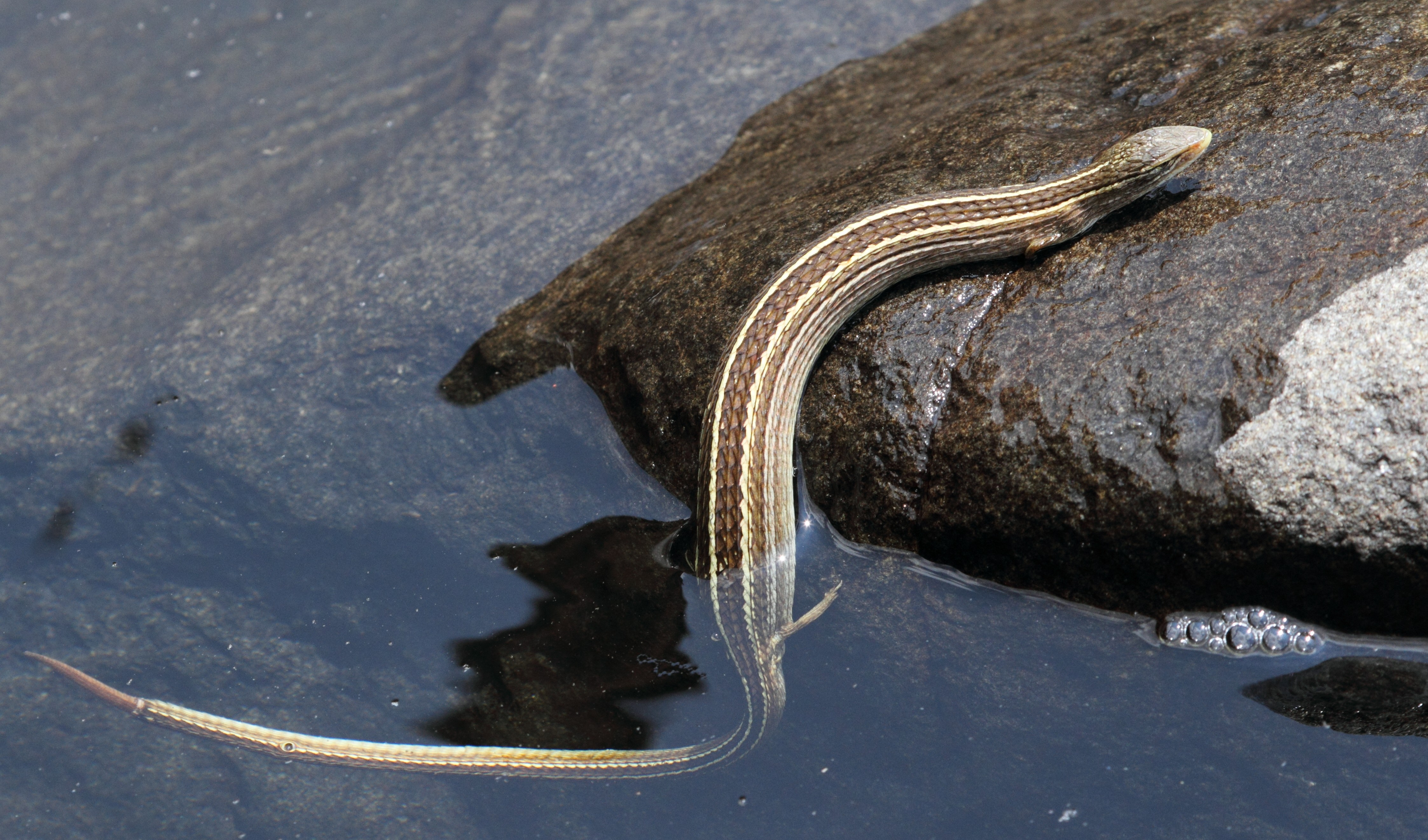
On a rock in a Drakensberg stream

The Transvaal grass lizard inhabits South Africa, Lesotho, and Eswatini. It can be found in grasslands and on slopes and ridges.

== Habits and breeding ==
This lizard is ovoviviparous, meaning mothers carry eggs inside their bodies until they are ready to hatch.

== Conservation ==
Neither the Southern African Red Data nor the International Red Data list the Transvaal grass lizard. However, the Swaziland Red Data puts the lizard at Near Threatened levels.

== Name ==
The scientific name of this lizard, Chamaesaura aenea, is due to the lizard's copper color. Aenea is a Latin word meaning "bronze" or "copper."

== See also ==
- Chamaesaura
