= Bronzeback snake-lizard =

Conservation status
- Least Concern (IUCN 3.1)

Scientific classification
- Kingdom: Animalia
- Phylum: Chordata
- Class: Reptilia
- Order: Squamata
- Suborder: Gekkota
- Family: Pygopodidae
- Genus: Ophidiocephalus; Lucas & Frost, 1897
- Species: O. taeniatus

Binomial name
- Ophidiocephalus taeniatus Lucas & Frost, 1897

Species of lizard

The bronzeback snake-lizard (Ophidiocephalus taeniatus) is a species of lizards in the family Pygopodidae endemic to Australia. It is monotypic in the genus Ophidiocephalus.
