= Delma grayii =

Conservation status
- Least Concern (IUCN 3.1)

Scientific classification
- Kingdom: Animalia
- Phylum: Chordata
- Class: Reptilia
- Order: Squamata
- Suborder: Gekkota
- Family: Pygopodidae
- Genus: Delma
- Species: D. grayii

Binomial name
- Delma grayii A. Smith, 1849

Species of lizard

Delma grayii, also known commonly as Gray's legless lizard, Gray's scalyfoot, and the side-barred delma, is a species of lizard in the family Pygopodidae. The species is endemic to Australia.

== Etymology ==
The specific name, grayii, is in honor of British herpetologist John Edward Gray.

== Geographic range ==
D. grayii is found in the Australian state of Western Australia, mainly along the central portion of the west coast.

The type locality was original given, in error, as "the interior of Southern Africa".

== Habitat ==
The preferred natural habitats of D. grayii are forest and shrubland.

== Description ==
D. grayii is limbless.

== Reproduction ==
D. grayii is oviparous.
