= Chamaesaura tenuior =

Conservation status
- Least Concern (IUCN 3.1)

Scientific classification
- Kingdom: Animalia
- Phylum: Chordata
- Class: Reptilia
- Order: Squamata
- Suborder: Scinciformata
- Infraorder: Scincomorpha
- Family: Cordylidae
- Genus: Chamaesaura
- Species: C. tenuior

Binomial name
- Chamaesaura tenuior Günther, 1895

Species of reptile

Chamaesaura tenuior, the Cape snake lizard, is a species of lizard which is found in the eastern Democratic Republic of the Congo, Uganda, Kenya, and Tanzania.
