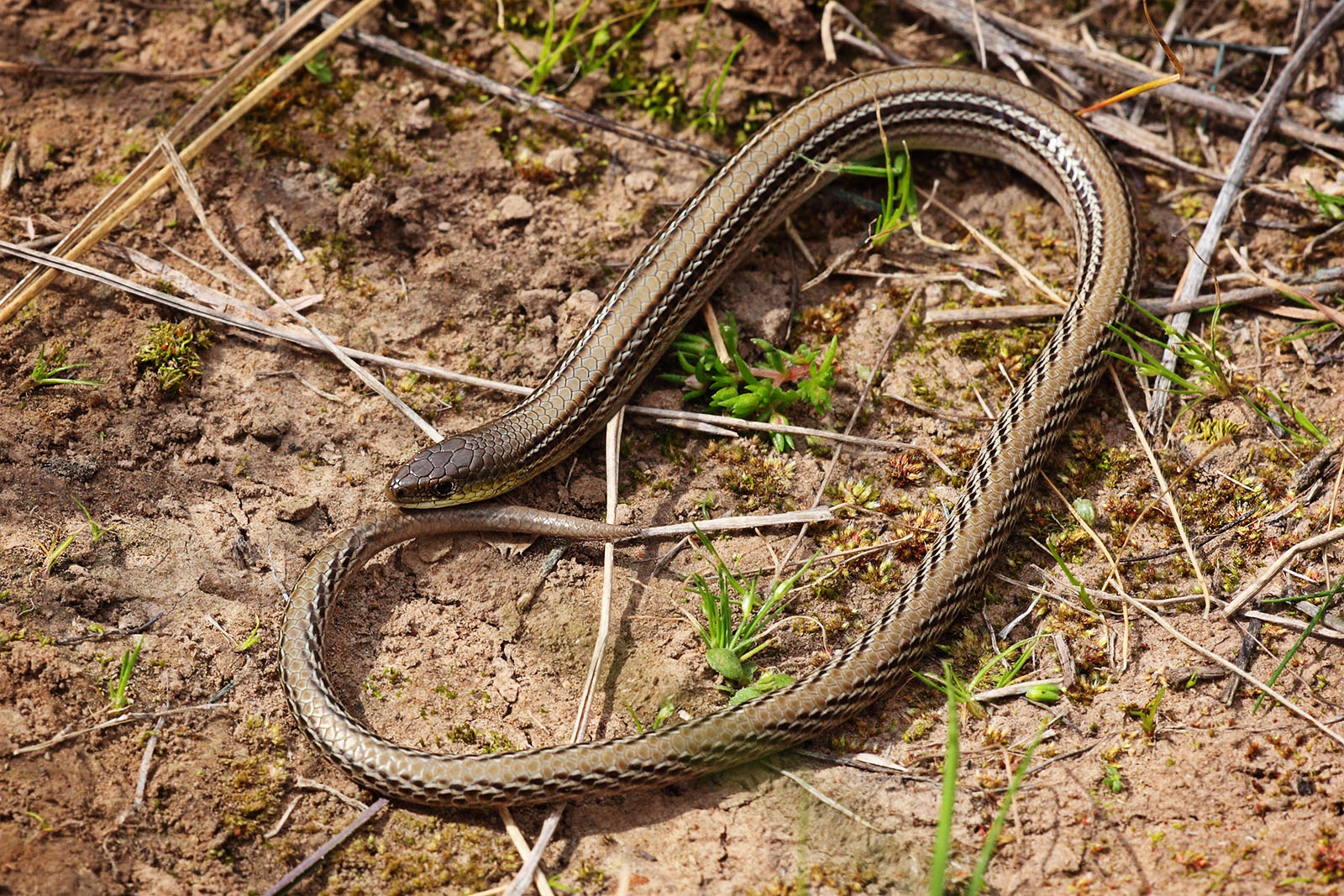

Conservation status
- Endangered (IUCN 3.1)

Scientific classification
- Kingdom: Animalia
- Phylum: Chordata
- Class: Reptilia
- Order: Squamata
- Suborder: Gekkota
- Family: Pygopodidae
- Genus: Delma
- Species: D. impar

Binomial name
- Delma impar (Fischer, 1882)

= Striped legless lizard =

Species of lizard

The striped legless lizard (Delma impar) is a species of lizard in the Pygopodidae family endemic to Australia. As of 2015 it is threatened with extinction, with few habitats left.

The lizard is up to 30 cm in length. It is superficially similar to a snake, and sometimes confused with the deadly brown snake. However, it is more closely related to the gecko and the skink. It has vestigial legs and an unforked tongue. Most of its body is made up of a non-detachable tail.

== Distribution and habitat ==
The striped legless lizard was formerly distributed throughout temperate lowland grasslands in the Australian Capital Territory (ACT), the south-western slopes and Southern Tablelands of New South Wales, central and southern Victoria, and the south-eastern corner of South Australia. The distribution of the species has declined, with many known sites no longer supporting populations. Due to habitat fragmentation the remaining populations are probably small and isolated.

Its sole habitat within Canberra is scheduled for development in late 2015–2016, which will destroy most of the small-animal population there. In an innovative effort, prior to bulldozers destroying the grasslands, roofing tiles are being used as "heat bait" to attract the lizards in the area. The captured lizards are then planned for evaluation, tracking, and transportation to what may be a sustainable habit 75 kilometres (47 mi) away.
