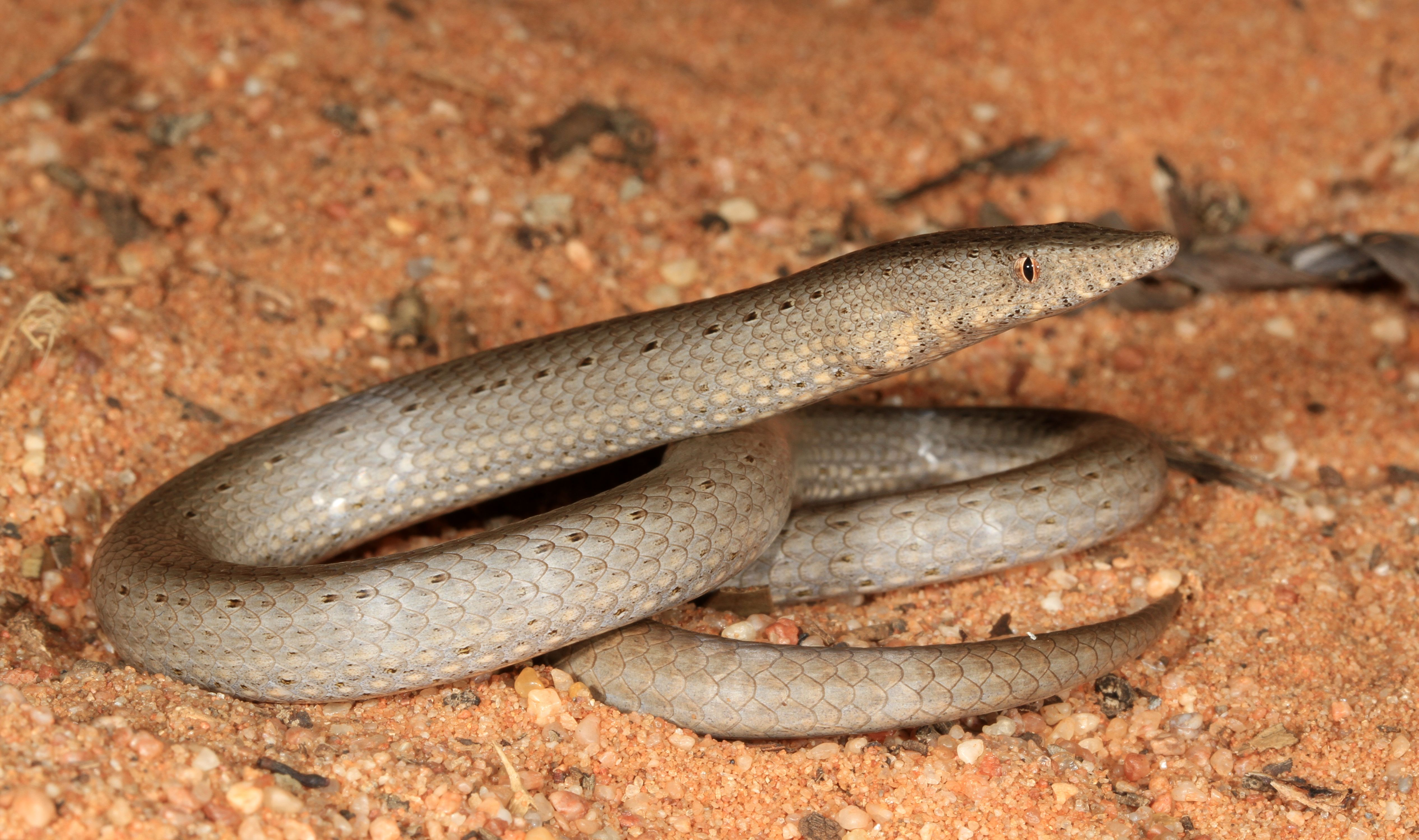
- Lialis burtonis

Scientific classification
- Kingdom: Animalia
- Phylum: Chordata
- Class: Reptilia
- Order: Squamata
- Suborder: Gekkota
- Superfamily: Pygopodoidea
- Family: Pygopodidae; Boulenger, 1884

Subfamilies
- 2, See text
- Geographic range of the family Pygopodidae in Australia and New Guinea

= Pygopodidae =

Family of lizards

Pygopodidae, commonly known as snake-lizards, or flap-footed lizards, are a family of legless lizards with reduced or absent limbs, and are a type of gecko. The 47 species are placed in two subfamilies and eight genera. They have unusually long, slender bodies, giving them a strong resemblance to snakes. Like snakes and most geckos, they have no eyelids, but unlike snakes, they have external ear holes and flat, unforked tongues. They are native to Australia and New Guinea.

Pygopodids have no fore limbs at all, but they do possess vestigial hind limbs in the form of small, flattened flaps. These may have some role in courtship and defensive behaviour, and may even aid in locomotion through vegetation. Some species are insectivorous burrowing animals, but others are adapted to moving through dense spinifex or other vegetation.

== Shared gecko characteristics ==
The pygopodids and other geckos share a number of characteristics:

- the production of parchment-shelled eggs in clutch sizes of two
- the ability to lick clean the clear spectacles that cover their lidless eyes;
- vocalization sounds like the common gecko "harsh squeak".
- skull anatomy
- inner ears anatomy
- communal nests. Some nests have been found to have as many as 30 eggs.

== Differences from snakes ==
Legless lizards are often killed due to their similar appearance to snakes. A number of external characteristics can be used to distinguish legless lizards (including the hooded scaly-foot) from snakes:

- Flap-footed lizards have vestigial hind limbs.
- Legless lizards have broad, fleshy tongues, dissimilar from the forked tongues of snakes.
- Most legless lizards have external ears.
- Ventral scales are in a paired series.
- Unbroken tails in legless lizards are much longer than the body, whereas snake bodies are longer than their tails.
- Can vocalise, snakes can not.

== Hearing ==
Pygopodids can hear tones higher than any other reptiles. Individuals in the species Delma pax can respond to a 60-decibel sound with a frequency of 11,100 Hz, more than an octave above the highest note on a standard piano.

== Taxonomy ==
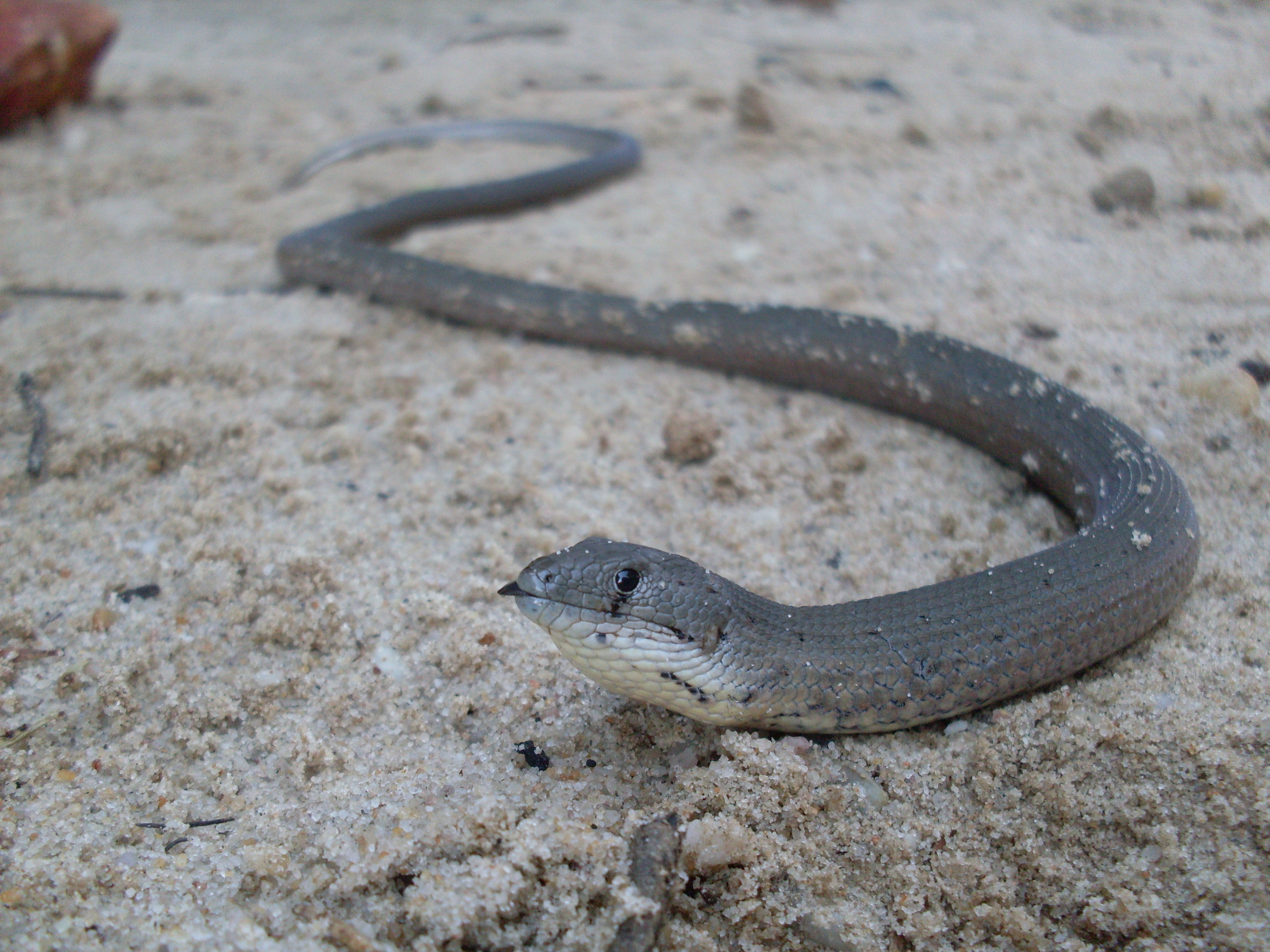
Pygopus lepidopodus

Pygopodidae is one of several taxonomic families of geckos, and is most closely related to two other Australian gecko families Carphodactylidae and Diplodactylidae.

== Classification ==
FAMILY PYGOPODIDAE

- Subfamily Lialisinae
  - Tribe Lialisini
    - Genus Lialis (two species)
- Subfamily Pygopodinae
  - Genus Delma (22 species)
  - Genus Paradelma (monotypic)
  - Genus Pygopus (five species)
  - Tribe Aprasiaini
    - Subtribe Aprasiaina
      - Genus Ophidiocephalus (monotypic)
      - Genus Aprasia (14 species)
    - Subtribe Pletholaxina
      - Genus Pletholax (2 species)

== See also ==
- Limbless vertebrates
