= Timeline of human impacts on the environment =

Long before the modern era, prehistoric humans (Note: The term "humans" is used in this article to refer to any hominins including anatomically modern humans (Homo sapiens) and other hominins such as Neanderthals and Homo erectus. For categories of hominins involved in megafauna extinctions, see Lemoine 2023, pp. 2–3 and Erlandson 2013, pp. 1–5. Studies that consider Neanderthals include Fordham 2024, Gretzinger 2019, and Andermann 2020. Studies that consider H. erectus include Sandom 2014, Erlandson 2013, and Dembitzer 2022. Denisovan hominins are considered by Lemoine 2023. Some authorities state that H. erectus and H. neanderthalensis had virtually no impact on the environment, relative to H. sapiens.) altered their environment in every continent except Antarctica. These modifications were not as intensive as the impacts seen in the Industrial Age but in some places, the landscape was impacted to such an extent that a major reorganization of society was required, for example in Southwest Asia and in the Maya civilization. By 12,000 years ago, more than 95% of Earth's temperate forests and 90% of its tropical forests were inhabited and altered by humans.

Impacts to the environment were produced by all types of human societies, including hunter-gatherers (which caused the earliest impacts), pastoral and agricultural societies. Early humans cleared land, harvesting wood, and set fires. In the First Agricultural Revolution, starting around 11,000 years ago, humans began to cultivate crops, causing environmental impacts to accelerate rapidly. Impacts from agriculture included soil erosion, nutrient depletion, and salinization. Prehistoric agricultural activities also increased atmospheric greenhouse gases such as carbon dioxide and methane – long before air pollution from coal and petroleum became common.

Humans introduced large numbers of domesticated animals (such as cattle, sheep, goats, pigs, and dogs) into ecosystems, which contributed to deforestation, habitat alteration, and soil erosion. Some introductions were deliberate, but some were inadvertent (rats, insects, and pathogens). Invasive species often had particularly devastating impacts on island ecosystems.

Starting in the Late Pleistocene, many large land animal species went extinct, including woolly mammoths, saber-toothed cats, giant ground sloths, moa, and giant tortoises. Scientists are still researching and debating what caused the extinctions, but human activity (hunting, fire, and habitat alterations) was certainly a factor in many of the Holocene extinctions. Climate change also contributed to some of the extinctions.

Major impacts on the environment were required for most societies to evolve and progress. Many prehistoric societies altered the environment in ways that increased biodiversity and enriched soil quality. Historical ecologists research prehistoric environmental impacts, and the studies may help address modern conservation challenges. The research also helps scientists define and understand the Anthropocene – the time period in which human activity has been a major influence on Earth's systems.

=== Timeline ===
Some events related to prehistoric human impacts on the environment. Time runs from left to right.

Some important milestones in the history of environmental impacts include (all dates approximate): (Note: An alternative list of major events related to environmental impacts is at Erlandson 2013, pp. 5–6.)

- 2.5 million years ago – Use of stone tools enabled behavioral changes in hominins that gradually started to impact the environment
- 2 million years ago - hominins in Africa evolved into the carnivore ecological niche.
- 195,000 to 12,000 years ago - the migration of humans around the world, from about 195,000 to 12,000 years ago.
- 75,000 to 50,000 years ago – Accelerated development of the technological skills of early modern humans
- 65,000 to 43,000 ya - human arrival in Australia
- 47,000 years ago – An early extinction tied to human activity: Genyornis newtoni. (Note: Another early megafauna extinction tied to human activity is the cave bear, which went extinct about 25,000 years ago.)
- 13,500 years ago - Humans arrived in North America from Asia about 13,500 years ago and migrated southward into South America.
- 13,000 years ago - The first humans to settle in Amazonia arrived, and began to alter the ecosystem.
- 12,800 years ago - The Clovis culture were peoples living in North America. Scientists have theorized that the Clovis hunted megafauna.
- 12,000 years ago – Hunter-gatherer societies became common. Nearly three-quarters of Earth's land was inhabited and used by humans. The portion of the Earth's surface subject to intensive human activity begins to increase. End of the Last Glacial Period and the start of the Holocene. (Note: The Holocene start date is about 11,700 years ago, or about 9,700 BCE.)
- 11,000 years ago – The First Agricultural Revolution enabled intensive impacts on the landscape by agricultural societies
- 11,000 to 3,000 years ago - Pastoral societies (based on the domestication of livestock) spread across much of the world between about 11,000 and 3,000 years ago, and they played a major role in modifications to the landscape.
- 10,600 - the colonization of islands (about 10,600 to 1,000 years ago).
- 10,000 ya - Humans began to impact their environment in China, when societies transitioned from hunter-gathering to agriculture.
- 9,800 ya - The Woolly rhinoceros became extinct in Eurasia around 9,800 years ago.
- 8,000 ya - The northern European forest cover began to decline.
- 7,000 years ago humans cleared forests, which may have indirectly caused an increase in the amount of greenhouse gases (including CO_{2} and methane) in the atmosphere. (Note: Methane increase starting 5,000 years ago may have been due to deforestation, agriculture, and domesticated livestock.)
- 6,000 years ago – Agricultural societies begin to use plows, shifting from horticultural societies to agrarian societies
- 6,000 years ago - Humans began grazing domesticated sheep (Ovis aries) and goats (Capra hircus) 6,000 years ago.
- 3,000 years ago - the creation of trade networks, from roughly 3,000 years ago to the modern era.
- 3,000 years ago - Islands of Melanesia experienced dramatic environmental transformations after initial human settlement.
- 3,000 to 1,000 years ago - erosion, nutrient depletion, increased salinity, and sediment accumulation in ponds and lakes. These impacts were significant around 3,000 years ago and accelerated 1,000 years ago.
- 1,000 BCE – Agricultural societies begin to shift from moderate to high-intensity
- 800 to 1200 CE. - Polynesians arrived on Easter Island; palm trees there become extinct around 1650.
- 1800 CE – Start of the Industrial Age, which accelerated impacts far beyond what they were in the agrarian era
