= Spinymussel =

Spinymussel may refer to:

- Elliptio spinosa or Altamaha spinymussel, also known as the Georgia spinymussel, a freshwater mussel native to southeastern Georgia in the United States
- James River spinymussel (Parvaspina collina) also known as the Virginia spinymussel, a freshwater mussel native to North Carolina, Virginia, and West Virginia in the United States
- Tar River spinymussel (Elliptio steinstansana), a freshwater mussel native to North Carolina in the United States
