= Chipola slabshell =

Conservation status
- Endangered (IUCN 3.1)

- Threatened (ESA)

Scientific classification
- Kingdom: Animalia
- Phylum: Mollusca
- Class: Bivalvia
- Order: Unionida
- Family: Unionidae
- Genus: Elliptio
- Species: E. chipolaensis

Binomial name
- Elliptio chipolaensis (Walker, 1905)

Synonyms
- Unio chipolaensis Walker, 1905

Species of mollusc

The Chipola slabshell (Elliptio chipolaensis) is a part of the phylum Mollusca and the class Bivalvia. This species has suffered a large decrease with upwards of 75% of habitat lost. It is now confined to only a few remnant sites in small drainages within the Chipola River. The federal Endangered Species Act protects it as a designated threatened species by Florida's Endangered and Threatened Species Rule.

== Description ==
The Chipola slabshell is a freshwater mussel that is oval shaped with a reddish-brown outer shell. They can have dark and light bands on the outer shell and the inside of the shell is reddish-yellow. They can reach a length of up to 8.5 cm (3.3 in). There is no sexual dimorphism shown in the characteristic of the shells.

== Life history ==
Currently, there is little information known about their complete life history. However, current beliefs suggest that males release sperm in the water and the female collects it via a siphon. Then, the eggs are fertilized in the shell of the female before the larvae are released into the water. Larvae development is dependent on a host fish. Meaning, larvae will attach themselves to the fins and gills of a host fish and young mussels will fall to the ground where it will settle. Once reaching sexual maturity, it can reach a length of up to 8.5 cm (3.3 in.). There is currently no information on its growth rate, offspring quality and quantity, age of dispersal, annual dormancy, or age-specific mortality rates.

== Ecology ==
=== Diet ===
In their immature life stage, they are considered parasitic and retrieve their nutrients from a host fish. In their mature life stage, they filter feed for plankton and detritus (dead organic matter).

=== Behavior ===
They are not colonial breeders (reproduce in a controlled way) and they are non-migrators. They are fixed in one place besides the voluntary movement of burrowing into the substrate. Passive movement occurs when high flows of water push them downstream. In the larval stage, they exhibit parasitic behaviors by attachment to host fish before going through metamorphosis and fall to the ground.

=== Habitat ===
Specifically found in northwest Florida in the Chipola River. They inhabit freshwater rivers with slow to medium currents and rest in a sandy or silt floor. Many are found in sloping bank habitats as well.

=== Range ===
In Florida their range is said to be 100–1,000 square kilometres (39–386 mi^{2}). They were found in Georgia and Alabama but seem to be extirpated there.

== Conservation ==
=== Past and current geographical distribution ===
Currently, the population is limited to Florida in the Chipola River mainstem and drainages of the Chipola River. Globally there are between 1,000 and 2,500 individuals left. About 3.7 living individuals were discovered on average per site. While it has been located in southeastern Alabama and southwestern Georgia, it is believed to no longer inhabit those areas.

=== Major threats ===
Pollution, construction, and an increase in human population are threats. The biggest threat is taking freshwater for drinking, flood control, and waterpower. Decreasing the speed of water leads to sedimentation, which covers the mussels. It also divides populations of mussels, host fish, such as bluegill (Lepomis macrochirus) and redbreast sunfish (Lepomis auritus), and algae.

=== Listing under Endangered Species Act ===
Currently listed at threatened (LT) as of 2019 under the U.S. Endangered Species Act.

=== Five-year review ===
A 2005 survey only found a single living slabshell in Chipola River. Working with US Army Corps of Engineers due to Chipola cutoff in 2006 causing mussel death due to unstable water channels. Chipola received a priority number of 11 which means they have a moderate degree of threat and have a low recovery potential. It is found that the water quality and quantity do not reach standards in the Section 305(b) in the Clean Water Act. The water basins are still fragmented by water withdrawals, new dams, and other habitat alterations that make it impossible for host fish between sites where the slabshells inhabit. The stream channels are still not stable and are threatened by degradation or erosion from things such as livestock grazing, road and bridge construction, and off-road vehicle use. However, states have made the commercial and recreational harvest of slabshells illegal. Also, Florida's criteria for ammonia levels are lower than the requirements listed by EPA and is currently protective for mussels. This matters because early life stages of Slabshells are sensitive to pesticides and herbicides. Zebra mussels and black carp are not found in Alabama, Georgia, and Florida, these are considered invasive species and would threaten Chipola slabshells. The relative stability of host fish in each sub-basin cannot be confirmed. Work has not been done to determine the necessary amount of genetic diversity in each sub-basin. Weak links also have not been identified in the life cycle of slabshells and propagation efforts haven't been started.

=== Species status assessment ===
No information currently available.

=== Recovery plan ===
The first step is to secure the existing subpopulations of slabshells and their habitats. This is the most important step due to their current declining numbers and the continuous threats to their habitats. To do this the threats need to be reduced and prevented, which can be done through regulatory mechanisms, partnerships with stakeholders, and habitat restoration programs. The recovery plan's second stage aims to expand the range of available subpopulations and available habitats. Given the current knowledge of these seven species, conservationists have calculated the number of individuals and stream miles required for down-listing and delisting. Increases can be achieved in one of two ways: either by discovering a previously unknown subpopulation or by intentionally reestablishing a new subpopulation. Reestablishing new subpopulations will necessitate close collaboration and agreement from the state(s) concerned, as well as any stakeholders having a stake in any possible reintroduction sites. Due to low numbers, it is most likely required that the new subpopulation will be laboratory- or hatchery-reared. The priorities for recovery using propagation include developing the propagation technology, increase and expand the ranges of current subpopulations to ensure their ability to thrive, and then reestablishing populations into other streams that fall within their historical range. The fourth step is to monitor the populations and habitats to measure and ensure their recovery. The recovery plan's fifth stage is to educate the public on the importance of freshwater mussels and their ecosystems. Beyond the attempts to build conservation partnerships with major stakeholders as part of achieving the first and second objectives, the fifth objective entails engaging the public. Mussels are affected directly and indirectly by human land and water usage throughout the entire watershed. Informing the public about watershed conservation in general, and the importance of mussels in their environment in particular will go a long way toward helping them recover. The last step is to evaluate the effectiveness of the plan's implementation because there is still so much unknown about this mussel, and it is believed that it will take more than 15 years for recovery to be accomplished.
