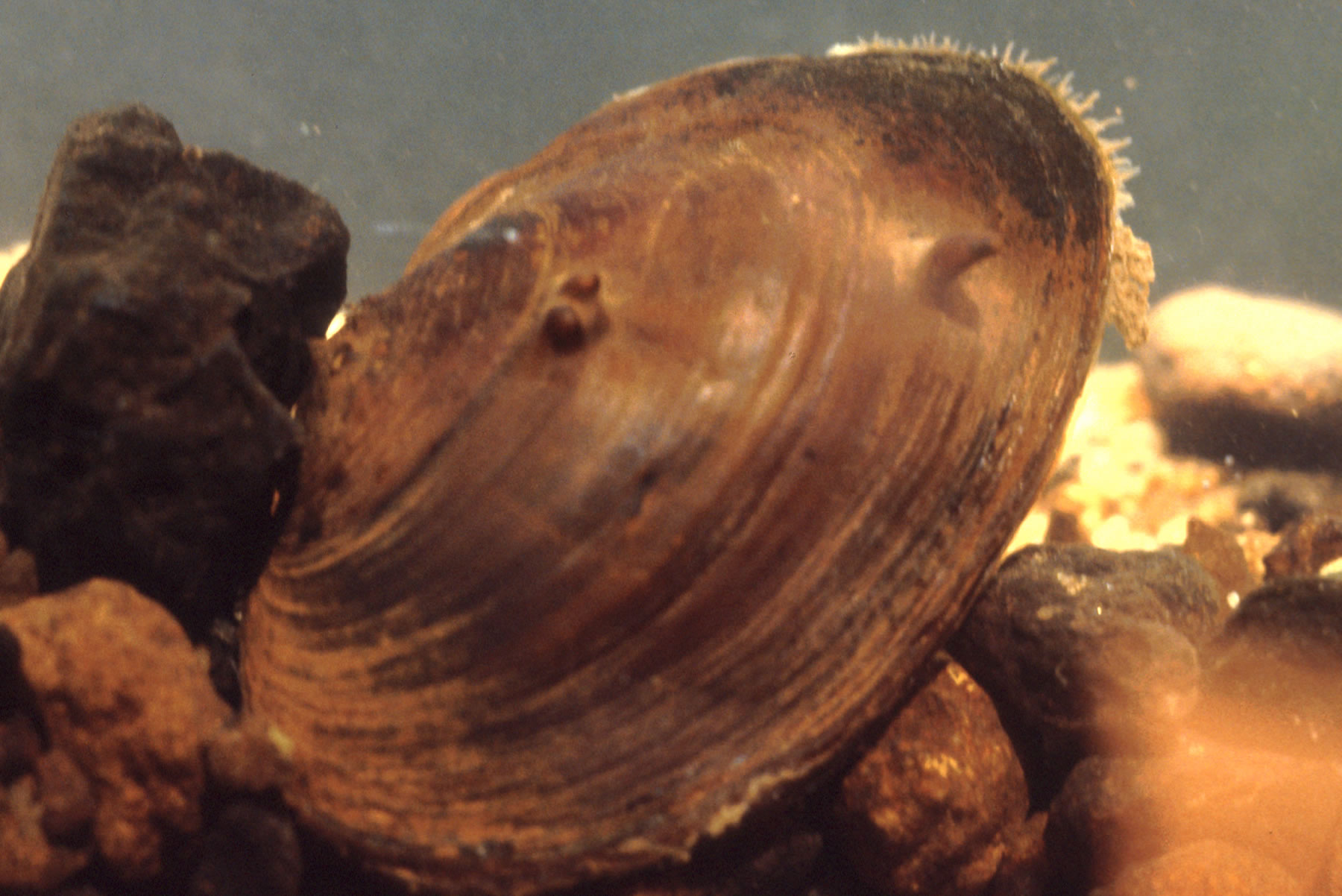
- Tar River spinymussel (Parvaspina steinstansana)

Scientific classification
- Kingdom: Animalia
- Phylum: Mollusca
- Class: Bivalvia
- Order: Unionida
- Family: Unionidae
- Tribe: Pleurobemini
- Genus: Parvaspina; Perkins, Johnson & Gangloff, 2017

Species
- P. collina; P. steinstansana

= Parvaspina =

Genus of molluscs

Parvaspina is a genus of freshwater mussels, aquatic bivalve mollusks in the family Unionidae. It contains only two critically endangered species, both endemic to river basins in a small region of the southeastern United States.

== Species ==
- Parvaspina collina (James River spinymussel)
- Parvaspina steinstansana (Tar River spinymussel)

Both species in this genus were formerly placed in other genera (Elliptio for steinstansana, Pleurobema for collina) before both being placed in the new genus Parvaspina in 2017.
