= Salinization =

Salinization is the process of increasing:

- Soil salinity
- Salinity of bodies of water
- Freshwater salinization -- increases in water salinity due to water pollution
