= Elliptio producta =

Conservation status
- Least Concern (IUCN 3.1)

- Vulnerable (NatureServe)

Scientific classification
- Kingdom: Animalia
- Phylum: Mollusca
- Class: Bivalvia
- Order: Unionida
- Family: Unionidae
- Genus: Elliptio
- Species: E. producta

Binomial name
- Elliptio producta Conrad, 1836

Species of bivalve

Elliptio producta, also known as the Atlantic spike, is a species of freshwater mussel, an aquatic bivalve mollusk in the family Unionidae, the river mussels. This species is endemic to the Eastern United States. It occurs on the Atlantic coast between the Savannah River and the Roanoke River basin. It may have been extirpated from the Ogeechee River system in Georgia. It lives in medium to large rivers on sand and gravel substrate.
