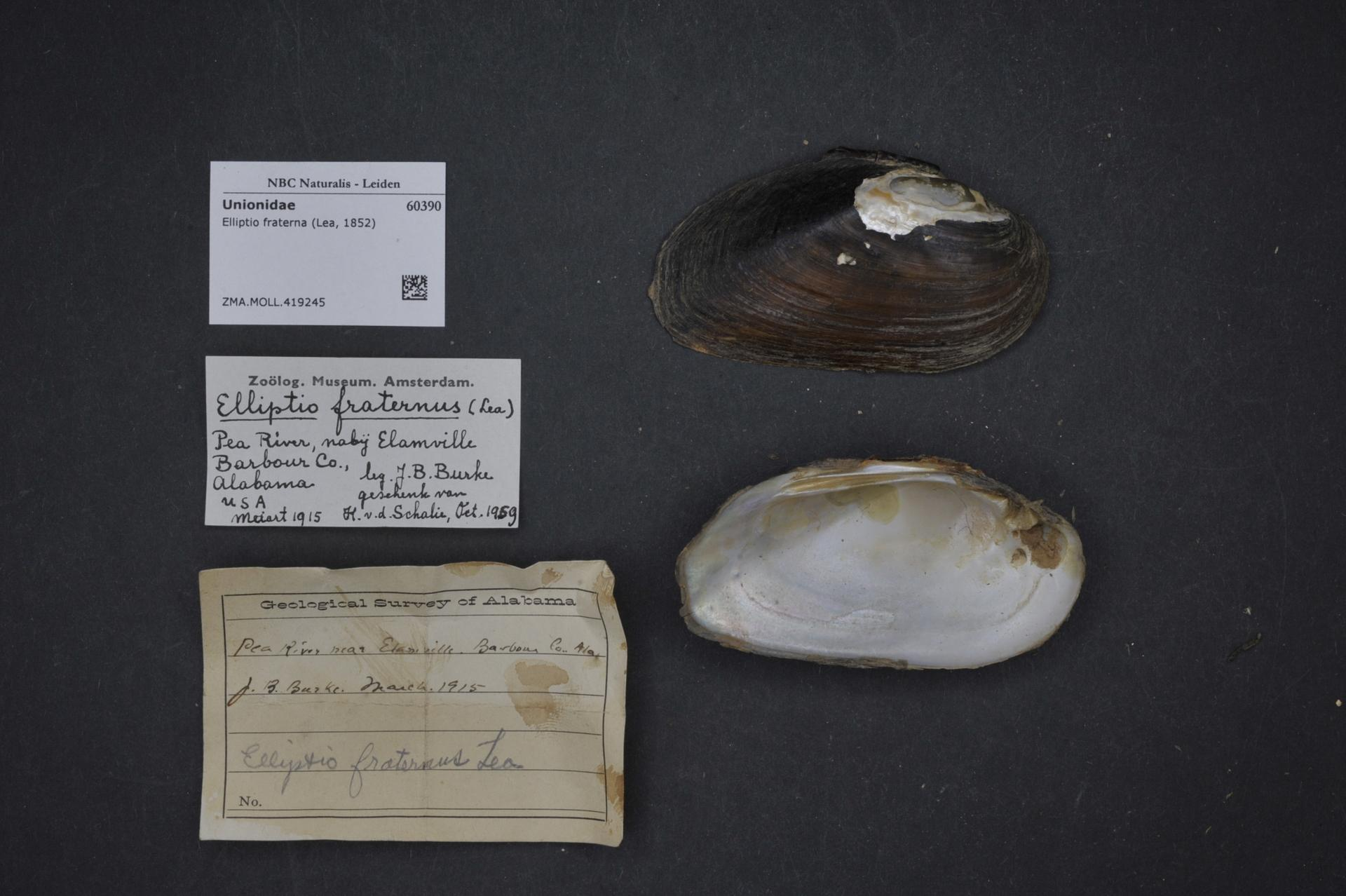

Conservation status
- Data Deficient (IUCN 2.3)

- Critically Imperiled (NatureServe)

Scientific classification
- Kingdom: Animalia
- Phylum: Mollusca
- Class: Bivalvia
- Order: Unionida
- Family: Unionidae
- Genus: Elliptio
- Species: E. fraterna

Binomial name
- Elliptio fraterna (I. Lea, 1852)

Synonyms
- Elliptio fraternum

= Brother spike =

Species of bivalve

The brother spike (Elliptio fraterna) is a species of freshwater mussel in the family Unionidae, the river mussels. This species is endemic to the Savannah River, United States. It listed as endangered in 1996 and was changed due to insufficient information and it has a world listing of " critically imperilled/imperilled.
