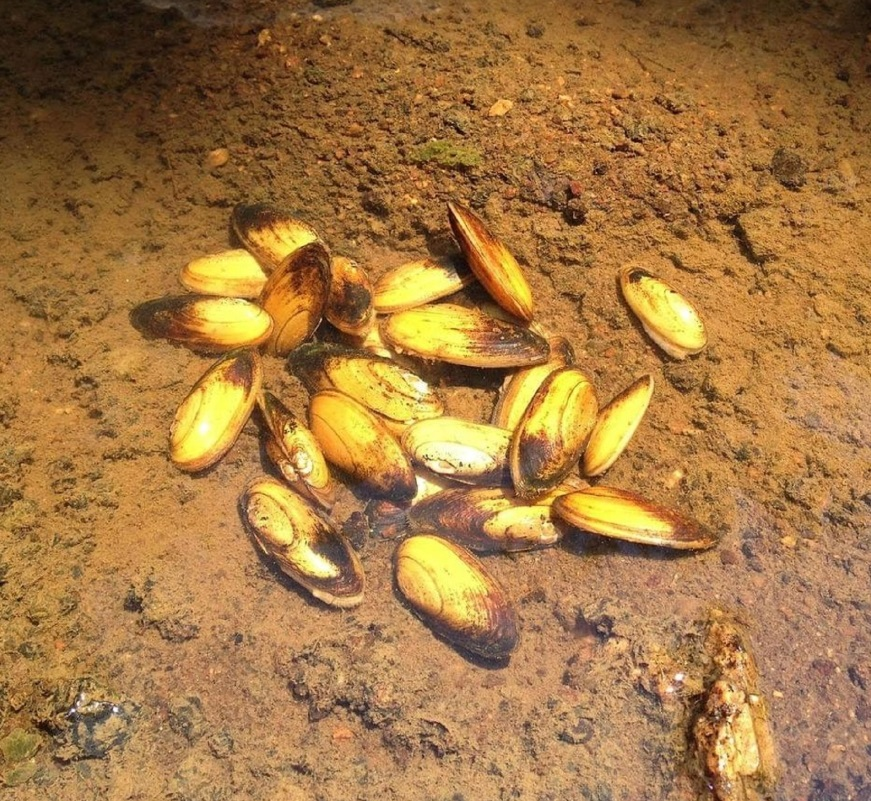

Conservation status
- Near Threatened (IUCN 2.3)

- Threatened (ESA)

Scientific classification
- Kingdom: Animalia
- Phylum: Mollusca
- Class: Bivalvia
- Order: Unionida
- Family: Unionidae
- Genus: Elliptio
- Species: E. lanceolata

Binomial name
- Elliptio lanceolata I. Lea, 1828

= Yellow lance =

Species of bivalve

The yellow lance, scientific name Elliptio lanceolata, is a species of freshwater mussel, an aquatic bivalve mollusk in the family Unionidae, the river mussels.

This species is endemic to the United States, where it occurs in Maryland, Virginia and North Carolina. It is listed as Threatened under the Endangered Species Act. As of 2019, there were 7 known populations. The species is threatened by declines in water quality, loss of stream flow, riparian and instream habitat fragmentation, and deterioration of instream habitats. These threats are exacerbated by urbanization and climate change.

The yellow lance is a bright yellow mussel with an enlongated shape, which grows up to 3.4 inches (86 mm) in length. The interior nacre is usually an iridescent blue color, with white or salmon color on the anterior half of the shell.
