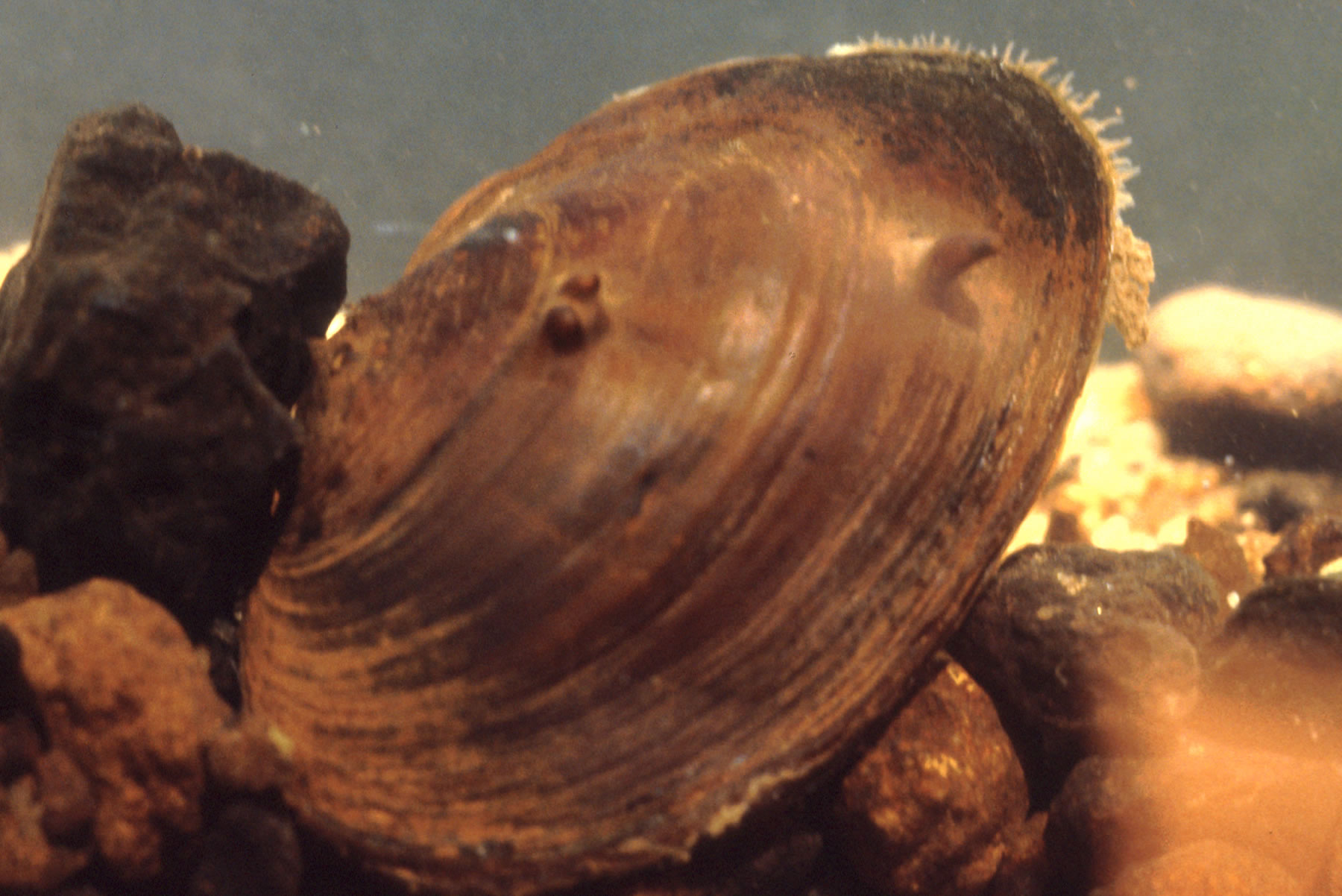

Conservation status
- Critically Endangered (IUCN 2.3)

- Endangered (ESA)

Scientific classification
- Kingdom: Animalia
- Phylum: Mollusca
- Class: Bivalvia
- Order: Unionida
- Family: Unionidae
- Genus: Parvaspina
- Species: P. steinstansana

Binomial name
- Parvaspina steinstansana (R.I. Johnson & Clarke, 1983)
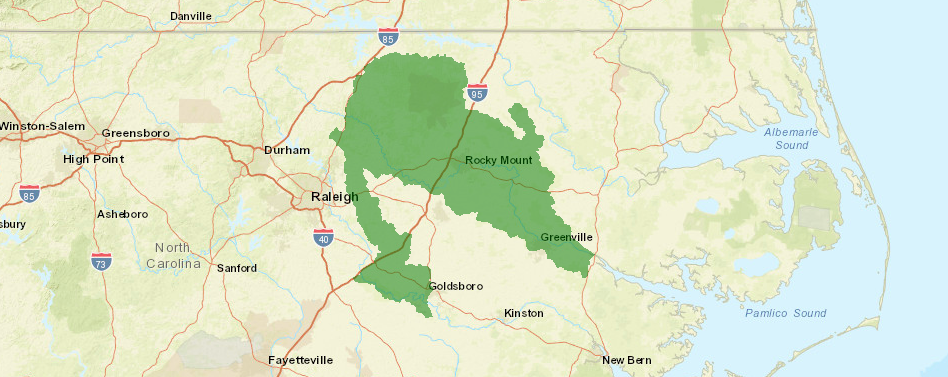

Synonyms
- Canthyria steinstansana (R. I. Johnson & Clarke, 1983); Elliptio steinstansana (R.I. Johnson & Clarke, 1983)

= Tar River spinymussel =

Species of bivalve

The Tar River spiny mussel or Tar River spinymussel (Parvaspina steinstansana) is a species of freshwater mussel in the family Unionidae, the river mussels. It is endemic to North Carolina in the United States and expected to go extinct without human intervention. Under the Endangered Species Act of 1973, it is an endangered species.

== Description ==
Tar River spinymussels are a shade of yellow/brown when young but as they grow they become darker brown. These mussels earn their name from the row of spines that run on the posterior ridge of their shells, also known as valves. Each of the valves on the Tar River spinymussels can have up to 6 spines. The larger Tar River spinymussels don't grow larger than roughly 5.5 cm (2.2 in).

== Distribution and habitat ==
This species is found in North Carolina. When the recovery plan was introduced, the three main populations of Tar River spinymussel were found in the main part of Tar River and in Swift Creek. The mainstream part of the Tar River contains two small populations while Swift Creek contains one larger population. All three of these populations are known to be able to reproduce. The population size of the Tar River spinymussel is estimated to be around 100–500.

The Tar River spinymussel is endemic to the Tar and Neuse rivers both currently and historically. Before this area was settled in the 1700s, it is likely that this species occurred in many large waterways within the Tar and Neuse river basins. The Shocco Creek, Tar, and Neuse River populations may already be locally extinct. The Sandy Creek, Fishing Creek, and Little River populations still exist but are very small. The current populations suffer isolation from one another.

The range of the Tar River spinymussel is very restricted which indicates that the suitable habitat for this species is limited. In the Tar River basin, the Tar River spinymussels exists in small population fragments while in the Neuse River basin, there is much less of the species found. The Tar River spinymussel is mostly found in loose beds of coarse sand and gravel. They are found in areas that are wooded near streams. The spinymussel lives in water that is fast-flowing and of good quality, with less runoff and sedimentation compared to the rest of the water system.

=== Population ===
Surveys done by the North Carolina Wildlife Resources Commission from 2014 to 2020 found only 11 individuals over the course of high-sampling efforts. This indicates that the population is still on the decline. There are currently fewer than 5 populations of Tar River spinymussels. These populations have low densities and are not connected geographically. Although surveys have recorded very few individuals it is possible that several thousands of Tar River spinymussels are still living. Although the historic population size of this species is uncertain, the historic range could have supported much larger populations.

== Ecology and behaviour ==
=== Lifecycle ===
The female spinymussels' time of gravidity runs from early April to mid-July. At the end of the gravid period the females release conglutinates into the water. Conglutinates are packets of glochidia. The fact that females release conglutinates multiple times during one brooding season makes the Tar River spinymussel iteroparous. The white shiner, the pinewoods shiner, and the bluehead chub are fish species that serve as the hosts for glochidia development. Temperature influences the amount of time during which the glochidia are attached on their host species. Studies have shown that warmer temperatures cause a shorter attachment time. Tar river spinymussels grow at a rate that ranges from 0.7-1.4mm/year. The closely related and also endangered James River spinymussel has a comparable life history. One study indicated that gravid James River spinymussels can release between 90 and 168 conglutinates. Juvenile Tar River spinymussels are about 4–10 mm (0.16–0.39 in) long.

=== Diet ===
Tar River spinymussels, like many other mussels, are filter feeders. They eat algae, plankton, and silts by drawing in water. This type of feeding helps purify the water around them.

=== Behavior ===
The Tar River spinymussel, makes conglutinates which are filled with glochidia, the larvae of a mussel. These conglutinates are made to attract its host. Many minnow species try to eat these conglutinates which make them a known host species to the Tar River spinymussel glochidia. The glochidia then attaches to the host and after it has developed, will detach. When this species reproduces, females of the Tar River spinymussel can release up to four to five times the amount of conglutinates.

== Threats ==
Sedimentation: Increased amounts of sediment entering streams and rivers damage the water quality of the habitat Tar River spinymussel occupies. Suspended sediment has the potential to clog the gills of freshwater mussels as well as changing the makeup of the sediments on the riverbed. Additionally, more suspended sediment leads to less light penetrating the water column which decreases phytoplankton abundance. Without sufficient phytoplankton, the mussels lose a large part of their food source.

Runoff water: High amounts of water running off of nearby non-penetrable surfaces have destabilized the stream and river banks where the Tar River spinymussel resides. Runoff water from agriculture, residence, and construction sites contain chemical pollutants that are a major threat to the extant populations. Pesticide in particular was implicated in the death of many individuals in the Tar River during a single event in 1990.

Timbering operations: Timbering and deforestation projects that operate within the Tar and Neuse river basins allow woody debris to enter the waterways and degrade the habitat of the spinymussels. Reducing the number of large trees that maintain the stability of the stream and river banks degrades the spinymussel's habitat.

Wastewater mismanagement: Wastewater management facilities along the Tar River have histories of violating regulations controlling effluent pollution from their sites. Wastewater effluent can introduce toxic chemicals, diseases, and microplastic pollutants into the habitat of Tar River spinymussels.

== Conservation ==
The Tar River spinymussel was listed as endangered on June 27, 1985. A Species Status Assessment is currently unavailable.

The five-year review for the Tar River spinymussel was initiated in the Federal Registrar on June 20, 2019. Its purpose was to provide information to decide whether this species should continue to be protected under the Endangered Species Act. It includes listing history, review history, population distribution, and factors that have been threatening the population.

To determine the listing for the Tar River spinymussel, threats were examined. These threats included habitat change, overutilization, disease and predation, and climate change. When the spinymussels were tracked, only eleven wild mussels were found. These extremely low numbers suggest that this species has been declining. Declining numbers as well as the previous threats mentioned indicate that the Tar River spinymussel still meets the definition of endangered. The five-year review concludes that this species should continue to receive protection under the Endangered Species Act.

The five-year review also mentions the recovery plan and gives recommendations to promote recovery of the Tar River spinymussel. These recommendations focus on providing a reintroduction program, decreasing threats, and habitat restoration.

=== Recovery plan ===
The recovery plan was first established in 1985, revised in 1992, and amended in 2019. In 1985, the reasons for listing included habitat modification/destruction, over-utilization, disease/predation, lack of regulatory mechanisms, and exotic species. The 1985 plan states that there is no need for critical habitat designation, and this has yet to be updated. For the Tar River spinymussel to be moved from endangered to threatened, the 1992 plan listed four criteria:

1. Evidence of reproduction in all populations
2. At least two new populations are discovered
3. All populations and their habitats are protected against future threats
4. All population sizes remain stable or increase in a period of fifteen to twenty years.

In 2019, these criteria were amended in three ways:

1. At least seven sub-population sizes must increase or remain stable
2. The spatial distribution of the seven sub-populations must include one sub-population in each of the Tar and Neuse river basins
3. The threats are managed so that the species will remain viable into the foreseeable future

Some of the actions provided to meet these criteria include using existing legislation, getting support via educational programs, as well as searching for and monitoring populations.
