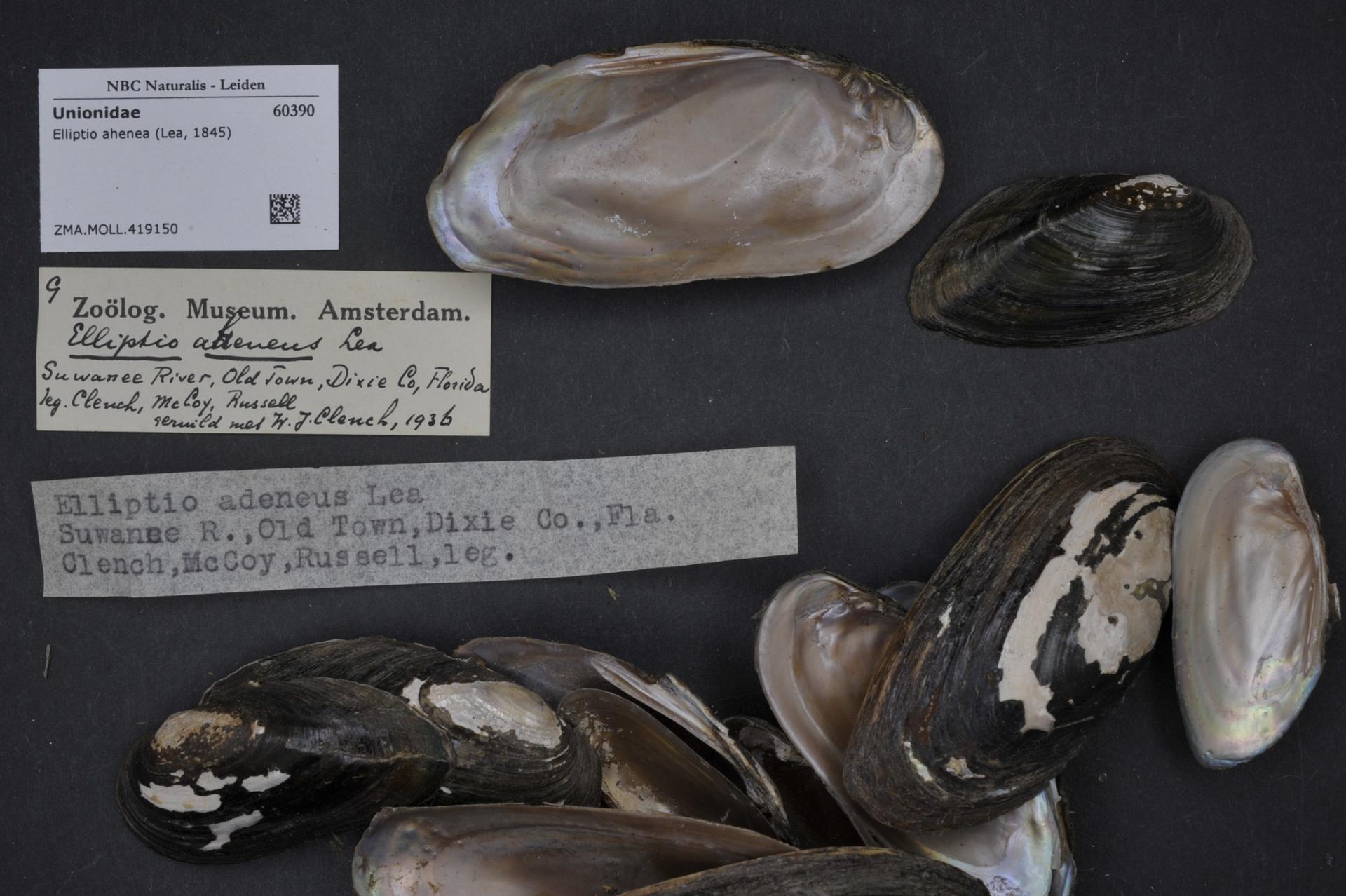

Conservation status
- Near Threatened (IUCN 2.3)

- Vulnerable (NatureServe)

Scientific classification
- Kingdom: Animalia
- Phylum: Mollusca
- Class: Bivalvia
- Order: Unionida
- Family: Unionidae
- Genus: Elliptio
- Species: E. ahenea

Binomial name
- Elliptio ahenea (I. Lea, 1843)

Synonyms
- List: Elliptio aheneus (I. Lea, 1843); Elliptio waltoni (B. H. Wright, 1888); Margaron (Unio) aheneus (I. Lea, 1843); Unio (Elliptio) aheneus I. Lea, 1843; Unio (Elliptio) waltoni B. H. Wright, 1888; Unio aheneus I. Lea, 1843; Unio waltoni B. H. Wright, 1888

= Elliptio ahenea =

Species of bivalve

Elliptio ahenea is a species of bivalve in the family Unionidae. It is endemic to the United States.
