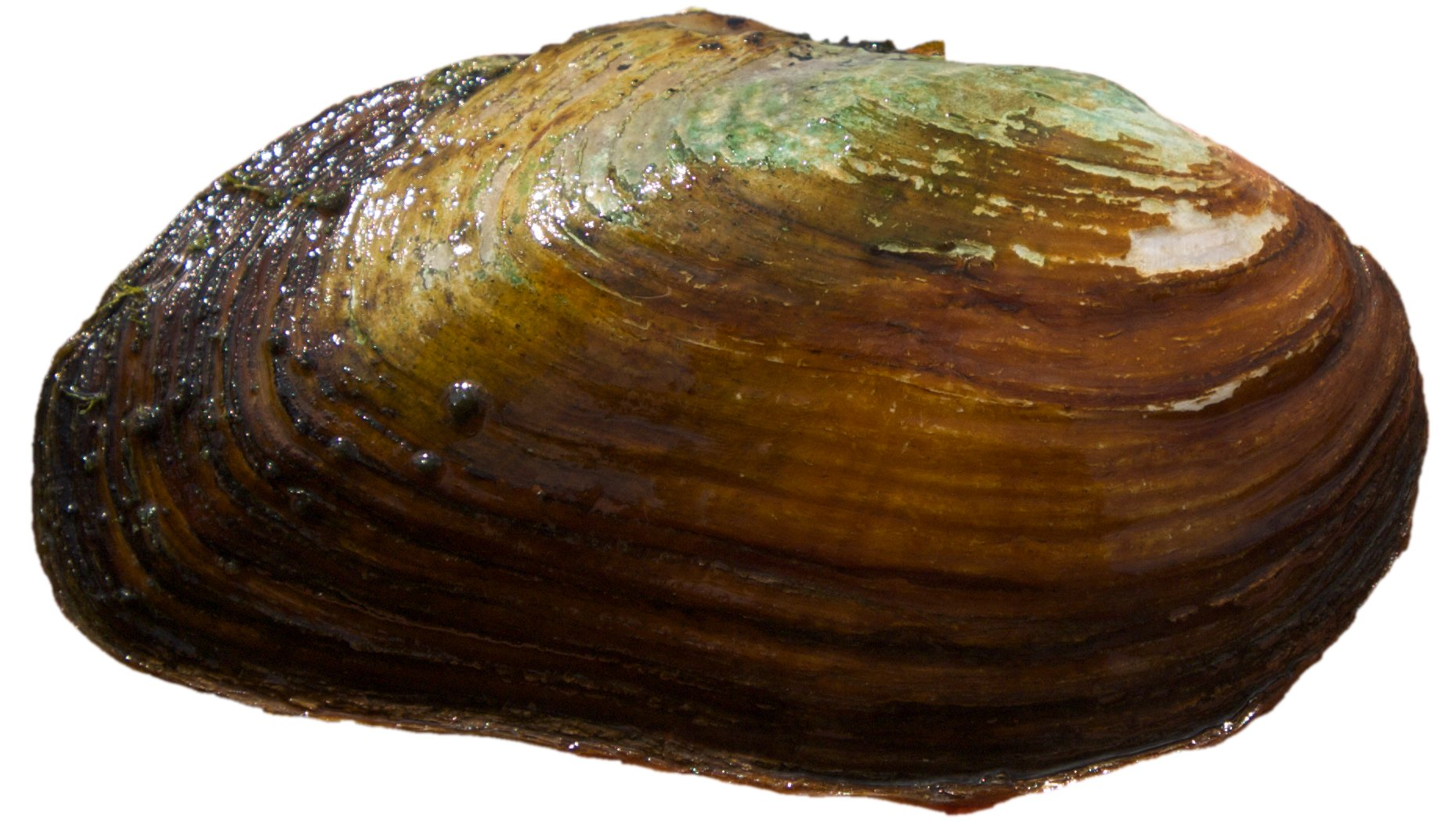

Conservation status
- Least Concern (IUCN 3.1)

- Secure (NatureServe)

Scientific classification
- Kingdom: Animalia
- Phylum: Mollusca
- Class: Bivalvia
- Order: Unionida
- Family: Unionidae
- Genus: Elliptio
- Species: E. complanata

Binomial name
- Elliptio complanata (Lightfoot, 1786)

Synonyms
- List: ? complanata Lightfoot; Elliptio complanata subsp. complanata (Lightfoot) 1786; Elliptio complanatus (Lightfoot) 1786; Elliptio complanatus subsp. catawbensis (I.Lea, 1857); Elliptio complanatus subsp. complanatus (Lightfoot) 1786; Elliptio complanatus subsp. cuvierianus (I.Lea, 1853); Elliptio complanatus subsp. jejunus (I.Lea, 1838); Elliptio complanatus subsp. northamptonensis (I.Lea, 1862); Elliptio complanatus subsp. quadrilaterus (I.Lea, 1863); Elliptio complanatus subsp. subinflatus (Conrad, 1835); Elliptio errans (I.Lea, 1857); Elliptio geminus (I.Lea, 1856); Elliptio insulsus (I.Lea, 1857); Elliptio nubilus (I.Lea, 1868); Elliptio rostrum (I.Lea, 1862); Elliptio spadiceus (I.Lea, 1857); Elliptio subinflatus (Conrad, 1835); Elliptio violaceus (Spengler, 1793); Elliptio violaceus subsp. cuvierianus (I.Lea, 1853); Elliptio violaceus subsp. jejunus (I.Lea, 1838); Elliptio violaceus subsp. northamptonensis (I.Lea, 1862); Elliptio violaceus subsp. subinflatus (Conrad, 1835); Elliptio violaceus subsp. wheatleyi (I.Lea, 1857); Margarita (Unio) complanata (Lightfoot) 1786; Margarita (Unio) griffithianus (I.Lea, 1834); Margarita (Unio) paliatus I.Lea, 1836; Margaritana decumbens (I.Lea, 1861); Margaritifera decumbens (I.Lea, 1861); Margaritifera decumbens (I.Lea, 1861); Margaron (Unio) abbevillensis (I.Lea, 1857); Margaron (Unio) aberrans (I.Lea, 1863); Margaron (Unio) baldwinensis (I.Lea, 1859); Margaron (Unio) beaverensis (I.Lea, 1868); Margaron (Unio) burkensis (I.Lea, 1859); Margaron (Unio) catawbensis (I.Lea, 1857); Margaron (Unio) chathamensis (I.Lea, 1863); Margaron (Unio) complanatus (Lightfoot) 1786; Margaron (Unio) contractus (I.Lea, 1857); Margaron (Unio) curatus (I.Lea, 1863); Margaron (Unio) cuvierianus (I.Lea, 1853); Margaron (Unio) datus (I.Lea, 1868); Margaron (Unio) decumbens (I.Lea, 1861); Margaron (Unio) errans (I.Lea, 1857); Margaron (Unio) exactus (I.Lea, 1858); Margaron (Unio) fuliginosus (I.Lea, 1845); Margaron (Unio) gastonensis (I.Lea, 1863); Margaron (Unio) geminus (I.Lea, 1856); Margaron (Unio) griffithianus (I.Lea, 1834); Margaron (Unio) humerosus (I.Lea, 1868); Margaron (Unio) indefinitus (I.Lea, 1863); Margaron (Unio) insulsus (I.Lea, 1857); Margaron (Unio) jejunus (I.Lea, 1838); Margaron (Unio) mecklenbergensis (I.Lea, 1863); Margaron (Unio) mediocris (I.Lea, 1863); Margaron (Unio) neusensis (I.Lea, 1858); Margaron (Unio) northamptonensis (I.Lea, 1862); Margaron (Unio) nubilus (I.Lea, 1868); Margaron (Unio) paliatus (I.Lea, 1836); Margaron (Unio) percoarctatus (I.Lea, 1857); Margaron (Unio) perlucens (I.Lea, 1863); Margaron (Unio) postellii (I.Lea, 1858); Margaron (Unio) protensus (I.Lea, 1865); Margaron (Unio) purus (I.Lea, 1858); Margaron (Unio) quadrilaterus (I.Lea, 1863); Margaron (Unio) raeensis (I.Lea, 1859); Margaron (Unio) raleighensis (I.Lea, 1863); Margaron (Unio) rostrum (I.Lea, 1862); Margaron (Unio) savannahensis (I.Lea, 1857); Margaron (Unio) spadiceus (I.Lea, 1857); Margaron (Unio) squameus (I.Lea, 1862); Margaron (Unio) subflavus (I.Lea, 1857); Margaron (Unio) subinflatus (Conrad, 1835); Margaron (Unio) uhareensis (I.Lea, 1868); Margaron (Unio) vicinus (I.Lea, 1856); Margaron (Anodonta) virens (I.Lea, 1857); Margaron (Unio) weldonensis (I.Lea, 1863); Mya complanata (Lightfoot) 1786; Mya rigidus Wood, 1828; Unio abbevillensis I.Lea, 1857; Unio aberrans I.Lea, 1863; Unio amplus I.Lea, 1872; Unio (Elliptio) aurata Rafinesque, 1820; Unio baldwinensis I.Lea, 1859; Unio beaverensis I.Lea, 1868; Unio burkensis I.Lea, 1859; Unio carinifera Lamarck, 1819; Unio catawbensis I.Lea, 1857; Unio chathamensis I.Lea, 1863; Unio cirratus I.Lea, 1874; Unio coarctata Lamarck, 1819; Unio (Elliptio) complanatus (Lightfoot) 1786; Unio (Elliptio) complanatus subsp. jejunus I.Lea, 1838; Unio complanatus subsp. mainensis Rich, 1915; Unio (Elliptio) complanatus subsp. quadrilaterus I.Lea, 1863; Unio complanatus subsp. subinflatus Conrad, 1835; Unio contractus I.Lea, 1857; Unio curatus I.Lea, 1863; Unio curvatus I.Lea, 1872; Unio cuvierianus I.Lea, 1852; Unio datus I.Lea, 1868; Unio decumbens I.Lea, 1861; Unio differtus I.Lea, 1872; Unio dissimilis I.Lea, 1872; Unio errans I.Lea, 1857; Unio exactus I.Lea, 1858; Unio fluviatilis Green, 1827; Unio fuliginosus I.Lea, 1845; Unio gastonensis I.Lea, 1863; Unio geminus I.Lea, 1857; Unio georgina Lamarck, 1819; Unio glabrata Lamarck, 1819; Unio griffithianus I.Lea, 1834; Unio humerosoides I.Lea, 1868; Unio humerosus I.Lea, 1868; Unio indefinilus I.Lea, 1863; Unio indefinitus Lea, 1863; Unio infulgens I.Lea, 1874; Unio infuscus I.Lea, 1872; Unio insulsus I.Lea, 1857; Unio irwinensis I.Lea, 1872; Unio jejunus I.Lea, 1838; Unio ligatus I.Lea, 1872; Unio mecklenbergensis I.Lea, 1863; Unio mediocris I.Lea, 1863; Unio neusensis I.Lea, 1858; Unio northamptonensis I.Lea, 1862; Unio nubilus I.Lea, 1868; Unio oblongus I.Lea, 1872; Unio percoarctatus I.Lea, 1857; Unio perlucens I.Lea, 1863; Unio postellii I.Lea, 1858; Unio protensus I.Lea, 1865; Unio (Arconaia) provancheriana Pilsbry, 1890; Unio pullatus subsp. majusculus de Gregorio, 1914; Unio purpurascens Lamarck, 1819; Unio purpureus Say, 1817; Unio purus I.Lea, 1858; Unio quadrilaterus I.Lea, 1863; Unio raeensis I.Lea, 1859; Unio raleighensis I.Lea, 1863; Unio rarisulcata Lamarck, 1819; Unio ratus I.Lea, 1872; Unio rhombula Lamarck, 1819; Unio rigidus Wood, 1828; Unio (Elliptio) roanokensis subsp. northamptonensis I.Lea, 1862; Unio roanokoides I.Lea, 1868; Unio rostrum I.Lea, 1862; Unio santeensis I.Lea, 1871; Unio savannahensis I.Lea, 1857; Unio spadiceus I.Lea, 1857; Unio squameus I.Lea, 1862; Unio subflavus I.Lea, 1857; Unio subinflatus (Conrad, 1835); Unio (Elliptio) subinflatus Conrad, 1835; Unio subolivaceus I.Lea, 1874; Unio subparallelus I.Lea, 1872; Unio subsquamosus I.Lea, 1872; Unio sulcidens Lamarck, 1819; Unio tortuosus G.B.Sowerby II, 1868; Unio uhareensis I.Lea, 1868; Unio vicinus I.Lea, 1857; Unio violaceus Spengler, 1793; Unio virens I.Lea, 1857; Unio virginiana Lamarck, 1819; Unio weldonensis I.Lea, 1863; Unio wheatleyi I.Lea, 1857; Unio yadkinensis I.Lea, 1872

= Eastern elliptio =

Species of bivalve

The eastern elliptio (Elliptio complanata) is a freshwater mussel in the Unionidae family, native to Canada and the United States. It is a bivalve member of the phylum Mollusca. Not only is it found in Canada and the United States, but it is frequently the most abundant species of mussel found in its home waterways. It is the most common mussel in the Delaware River and the most common mussel found in the state of New Hampshire and Vermont. It can be found in the substrate at the bottom of lakes, ponds and rivers. Size is variable, but can reach up to 13 centimetres (5.1 in) in length.

== Reproduction ==
The eastern elliptio reproduces sexually via spawning from third week of April to second week of June.

== Life cycle ==
Like most Unionidae, Elliptio complanata begins as an egg within the gills of the female elliptio, matures into a glochidium, attaches itself to a host fish species and then becomes a juvenile mussel. Elliptio complanata is known to attach to several fish species including American eel Anguilla rostrata, brook trout Salvelinus fontinalis, lake trout Salvelinus namaycush, mottled sculpin Cottus bairdii, and slimy sculpin Cottus cognatus. It has the most success maturing on the American eel.
