= Elliptio mcmichaeli =

Conservation status
- Near Threatened (IUCN 3.1)

- Imperiled (NatureServe)

Scientific classification
- Kingdom: Animalia
- Phylum: Mollusca
- Class: Bivalvia
- Order: Unionida
- Family: Unionidae
- Genus: Elliptio
- Species: E. mcmichaeli

Binomial name
- Elliptio mcmichaeli Clench & Turner, 1956

Species of bivalve

Elliptio mcmichaeli, the fluted elephantear, is a species of freshwater mussel, an aquatic bivalve mollusk in the family Unionidae, the river mussels.

This species is endemic to the Escambia and Choctawhatchee River systems in the southeastern United States. As of 2014, its NatureServe conservation status is "imperiled."
