= Alabama spike =

Conservation status
- Data Deficient (IUCN 2.3)

- Imperiled (NatureServe)

Scientific classification
- Kingdom: Animalia
- Phylum: Mollusca
- Class: Bivalvia
- Order: Unionida
- Family: Unionidae
- Genus: Elliptio
- Species: E. arca

Binomial name
- Elliptio arca (Conrad, 1834)

Species of bivalve

The Alabama spike (Elliptio arca) is a species of freshwater mussel, an aquatic bivalve mollusk in the family Unionidae, the river mussels.

This species is endemic to the United States, where it occurs in river systems in Mississippi, Alabama, and Georgia. Its range has declined significantly in the last 100 years and it will likely be extirpated from parts of its range in the near future.

It has previously been considered endangered, but there is too little current information to determine its present status.
