= Elliptio nigella =

Conservation status
- Critically Endangered (IUCN 3.1)

- Critically Imperiled (NatureServe)

Scientific classification
- Kingdom: Animalia
- Phylum: Mollusca
- Class: Bivalvia
- Order: Unionida
- Family: Unionidae
- Genus: Elliptio
- Species: E. nigella

Binomial name
- Elliptio nigella (I. Lea, 1852)

Species of bivalve

Elliptio nigella, the winged spike or recovery pearly mussel, is a species of freshwater mussel, an aquatic bivalve mollusk in the family Unionidae, the freshwater mussels.

This species is endemic to the United States. It was thought to be extinct, but was rediscovered in 2010. It is not known if the rediscovered population is viable. As of the most recent surveys, it appears to be abundant in the lower Flint River, with its typical habitat being large rivers around boulders and cobble in crevices. They look similar to E. pullata and E. fumata, which are also abundant in its range. E. nigella can be distinguished by its axe-shaped shell with a distinctive notch anterior to the umbo.
