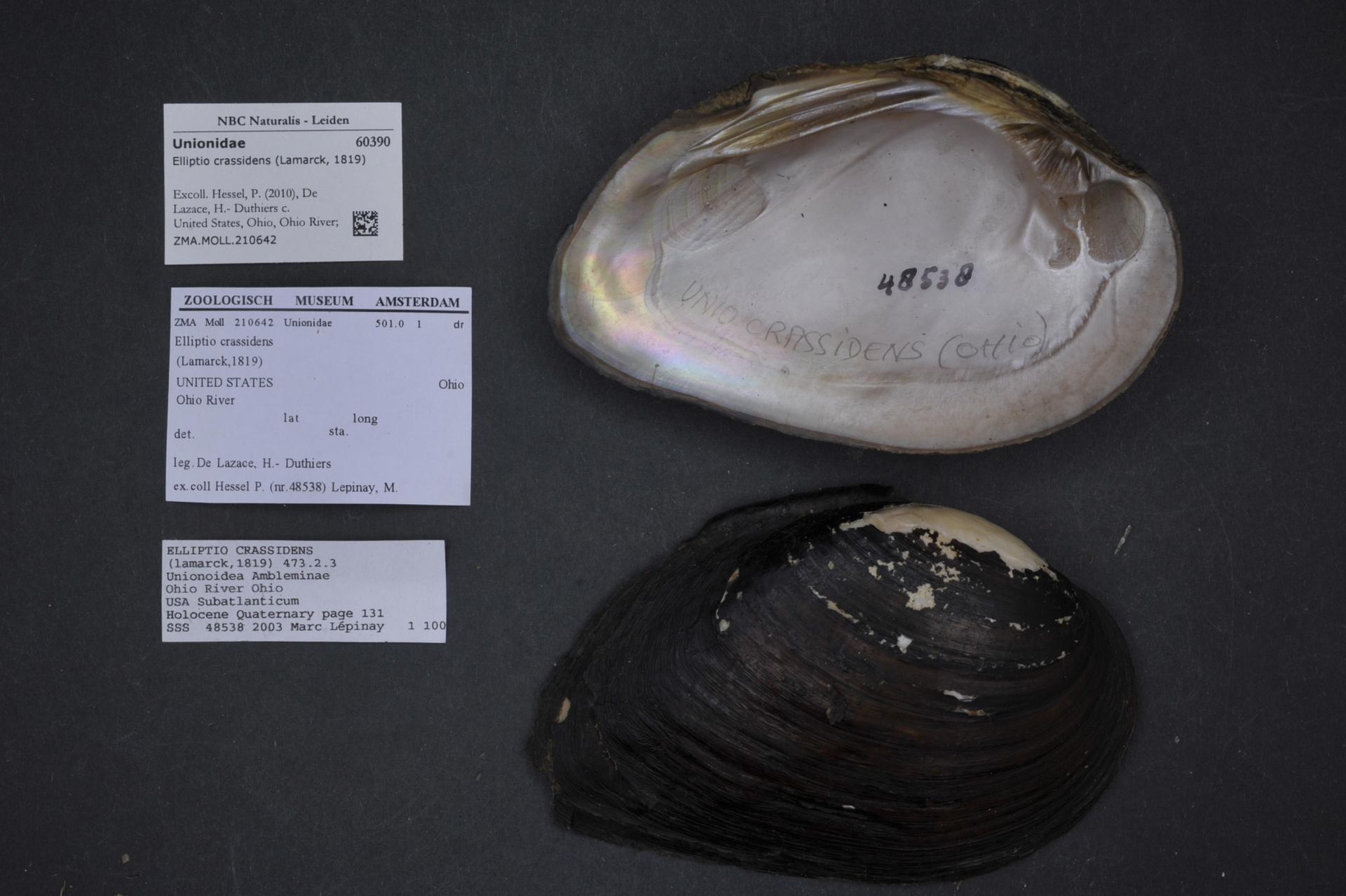

Conservation status
- Least Concern (IUCN 3.1)

- Secure (NatureServe)

Scientific classification
- Kingdom: Animalia
- Phylum: Mollusca
- Class: Bivalvia
- Order: Unionida
- Family: Unionidae
- Genus: Elliptio
- Species: E. crassidens

Binomial name
- Elliptio crassidens (Lamarck, 1819)

Synonyms
- Elliptio crassidens subsp. crassidens (Lamarck, 1819); Elliptio crassidens subsp. danielsii (B.H.Wright, 1899); Elliptio crassidens subsp. incrassatus (I.Lea, 1840); Elliptio niger (Rafinesque, 1820); Elliptio niger subsp. danielsi (B.H.Wright, 1899); Obliquaria (Aximedia) venus Rafinesque, 1831; Unio crassidens Lamarck, 1819; Unio (Elliptio) crassidens subsp. incrassatus (I.Lea, 1840); Unio cuneatus Barnes, 1823; Unio incrassatus I.Lea, 1840; Unio (Elliptio) danielsii B.H.Wright, 1899; Unio (Elliptio) nigra Rafinesque, 1820; Unio (Elliptio) nigra subsp. fusca Rafinesque, 1820; Unio (Elliptio) nigra subsp. maculata Rafinesque, 1820

= Elliptio crassidens =

Species of bivalve

Elliptio crassidens, the elephant-ear, is a species of freshwater mussel, an aquatic bivalve mollusk in Unionidae, the river-mussel family.

The elephant-ear possesses a thick triangular shell which may be up to six inches long. The outside of the shells is brown or black while the inside is typically light purple. It usually is found in the mud, sand, or fine gravel of large rivers. This mussel is found in the midwestern, eastern, and some southern states of the United States as well as the provinces of Quebec and Ontario in Canada.

Elephant-ears typically breed once a year. Breeding seasons are short, lasting from either April through May or June to July. Both males and females reach sexual maturity at four to six years. Larvae stay in their mother's gills anywhere from a few weeks to a few months. Eventually, the offspring will attach to a host fish's fins or gills. After living parasitically on the host fish for several weeks, juvenile clams break free and fall to bottom of the river where they burrow and develop into adult mussels. The mussels will not likely move more than a few meters from this site throughout their lives. Elephant-ears are filter feeders, consuming primarily bacteria, protozoans, algae, and plankton. Common predators include otters, raccoons, muskrats, herons, egrets, and a variety of fish. Like other mussels, elephant-ears are thought to be long-lived, with lifespans from 20 to as long as 100 years.

Although widespread, elephant-ears are relatively rare in the Midwest, but are locally abundant in some parts of the Ohio and White rivers of Illinois and Indiana. Elephant-ear mussels are listed as endangered in Minnesota, Missouri, Wisconsin, Ohio and Virginia, and are considered threatened in Illinois.
