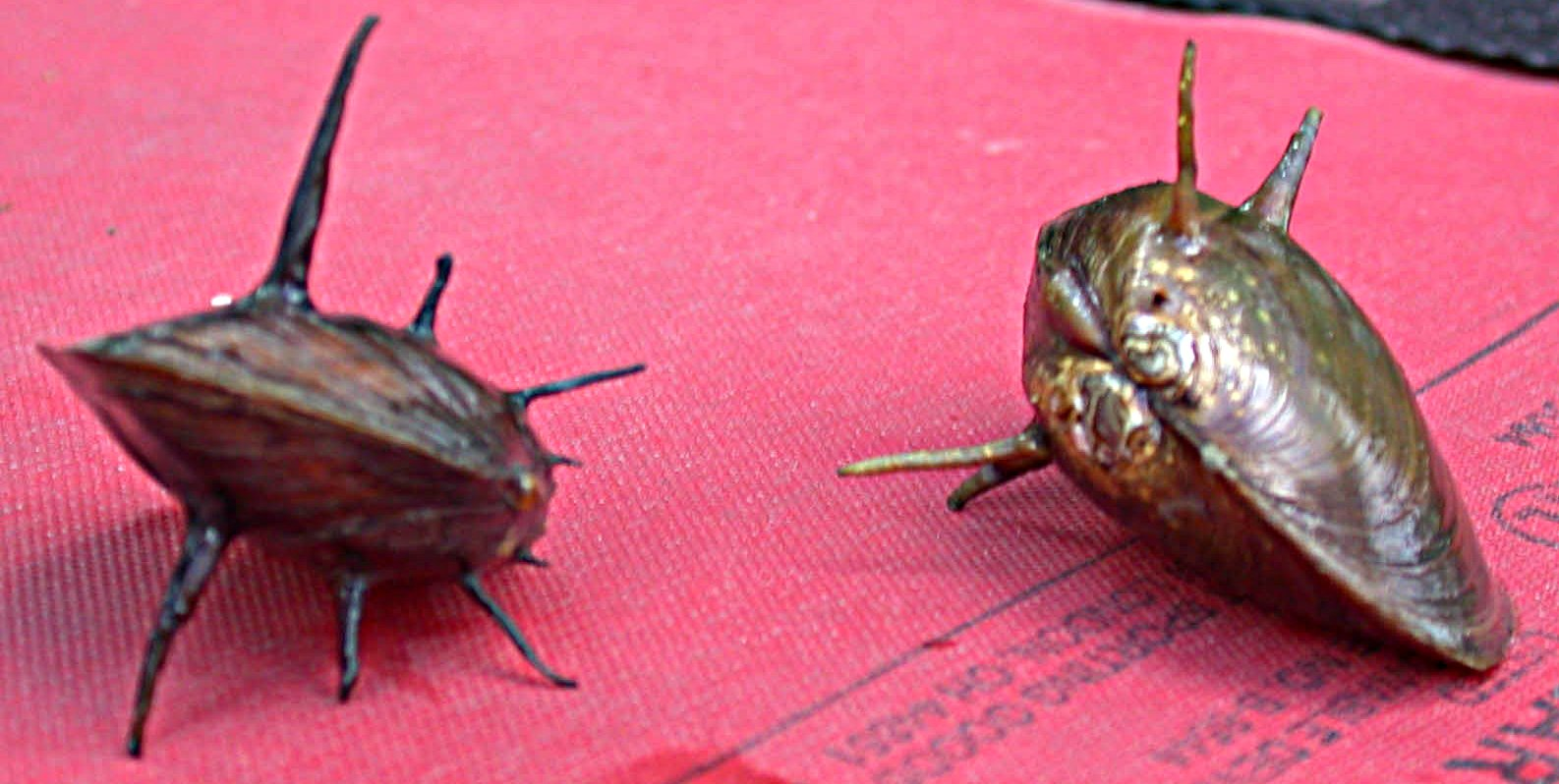
- Two live individuals of Elliptio spinosa

Conservation status
- Endangered (IUCN 3.1)

- Endangered (ESA)

Scientific classification
- Kingdom: Animalia
- Phylum: Mollusca
- Class: Bivalvia
- Order: Unionida
- Family: Unionidae
- Genus: Elliptio
- Species: E. spinosa

Binomial name
- Elliptio spinosa (I. Lea, 1836)

Synonyms
- Unio spinosus I. Lea, 1836

= Elliptio spinosa =

Elliptio spinosa Altamaha spinymussel

Species of bivalve

Elliptio spinosa, the Altamaha spinymussel, is an endangered species of freshwater mussel in the family Unionidae. They live in southeastern Georgia in the Altamaha river and its tributaries. It is one of three species of North American spinymussels which are recognizable by their prominent spines. The Altamaha spinymussel genetically diverged from the other spinymussels 3.76 million years ago. This suggests that their spines evolved separately from the spines of other North American spinymussels. The Altamaha spinymussel is on the Endangered Species Act because of many threats with the most prominent threats being habitat loss, decrease in water quality, shrinking range, small population size, and vulnerability to disturbances.

== Description ==
The Altamaha spinymussel grows up to 11 cm (4.3 in) in length, and its shell is smooth and shiny. In young mussels, the outside of the shell is greenish yellow with green rays that darken over time to brown while the inside of the shell is pink or purple. The overall shape of the shell is triangular or diamond-like and has moderate inflation. Each mussel has one to four or five spines on each valve that vary from 1–2.5 cm (0.39–0.98 in) in length, can be either crooked or straight and are in a parallel line from the shell's hinge to the wide outer edge of the mussel.

== Life history ==
The life history traits of the Altamaha spiny mussel have not been studied, but the life histories of other species in the Elliptio genus have. Scientists have used this information to construct an approximate life history of the Altamaha spinymussel. Female mussels have eggs that get fertilized by sperm in late spring. The fertilized eggs brood in the female until they are mature larvae called glochidia. The glochidia are released into the water in May or June. In order for glochidia to survive and become a juvenile mussel they need to attach to a host fish. The host fish species for Altamaha spinymussel is not known. Once the spinymussel matures in the host fish it will release and settle into the sandy river floor. For the first few months of life the spinymussel will feed through its foot. It will later be able to use filter feeding. Neither the longevity nor the age at sexual maturity are known for the Altamaha spinymussel. (It is also currently unknown how many times they reproduce in a lifetime, offspring quality and quantity (e.g., number and size of offspring, sex ratio of offspring), age of dispersal, annual dormancy, and age-specific mortality rates.)

== Ecology ==
=== Diet ===
Juvenile Altamaha spinymussels feed with their foot by pulling bacteria, algae, and decomposing organisms from the sediment on the river floor. Adult spinymussels are filter feeders which are capable of filtering up to 40 gallons of water per day. As water passes through their gills they are able to capture their food and can filter out the undesirable parts and intake small pieces of prey all at once. This prey comes in the forms of phytoplankton, diatoms, and other microorganisms.

=== Behavior ===
The Altamaha spinymussel uses the spines on their backs to help anchor themselves in the shifting environments of sandy river bottoms. They usually anchor themselves 5–10 cm (2.0–3.9 in) below the surface. There is currently no information on mating and territorial behavior.

=== Habitat ===
Altamaha spinymussels are generally found in a range of coarse to fine sediments in sandbars, sloughs, and mid-channel islands. These habitats provide the spinymussel with cover and sites for breeding and reproduction. Altamaha spinymussels are restricted to areas of swift flowing water and will bury 5–10 cm into the sediment (1.96-3.94 inches). They need swift flowing water because it transports food, removes waste, and provides oxygen. Their habitat is the coastal plains region of the Altamaha river and its tributaries. The tributaries include the Ohoopee, Ocmulgee, and Oconee rivers. The water quality that Altamaha spinymussels need has not been studied but mussels in general need to tolerate a wide range of conditions because they are sedentary. The Altamaha spinymussel survives in an area as long as the sandbar, slough, or mid-channel island habitat is maintained and water quality is high enough year-round.

=== Range ===
The historic range of the Altamaha spinymussel restricts to the state of Georgia, specifically the coastal plains area of the Altamaha River in the southeast region of the state. The Altamaha River is fed by three tributaries, the Ocmulgee, Ohoopee, and Oconee rivers. There have been historic sightings of the Altamaha spinymussels in all 4 rivers (see Species Status Assessment for range map).

== Conservation ==
=== Population size ===
The current population size of the Altamaha spinymussel is unknown. The species was first surveyed in the 1960s. Since then, two of the four populations have become locally extinct. This shows evidence of considerable declines in the population size.

=== Past and current geographical range ===
Throughout the species history there have been reductions in total population size. This is due to declining recruitment (birth or immigration), number of populations, and number of individuals in each population. The Altamaha spinymussel cannot be found in its historic habitats on the Altamaha and Ocmulgee rivers. Populations that are still present have had strong declines in individuals present.

During the first surveys in the 1960s there were 4 main populations of Altamaha spinymussels. These populations were the Ocmulgee, Oconee, Ohoopee, and Lower Altamaha. The Altamaha spinymussel population is locally extinct in the Oconee and Lower Altamaha. The population in the Ohoopee river is suffering due to water quality and drought conditions. The population in the Ocmulgee has moderate resiliency and is doing best due to higher water quality and quantity.

=== Major threats ===
The Altamaha spinymussel is facing many distinct threats, most notably destruction of its habitat. Sedimentation has become an increasing disturbance as forest management in the area has increased the number of unpaved roads. There has also been increased ATV activity in the area that has increased sedimentation. This leads to greater surface runoff which causes more particles and debris to enter the water. Increased sediments in the water decreases breathing and feeding efficiency, making it more difficult for the mussels to survive, especially in the juvenile stages. Other contaminants may enter the water through community wastewater, and agriculture. These contaminants decrease the amount of oxygen in the water through eutrophication and increase the water acidity which is lethal to mussels.

Overcollection may have also caused population declines. This is especially present in the Ohoopee river where localized declines have been seen.

Invasive species such as the Asian Clam have been introduced to the Altamaha River. This increases the competition for space and nutrients with the Altamaha spinymussel and makes survival more difficult.

The final major threat to the Altamaha spinymussel is risk of inbreeding and low genetic diversity. This is caused by the decreased population sizes and physical separation of the populations. Low genetic diversity could lead to decreased resilience to disturbance because all individuals would be equally able to survive.

=== Listing under the ESA ===
The Altamaha spinymussel was first petitioned for the Endangered Species Act in 1989. It was listed as threatened or endangered on November 10, 2011, due to threats including habitat destruction and modification.

=== 5-Year review ===
A 5-year review of the endangered or threatened status of the Altamaha spinymussel was initiated on August 6, 2018. This review is meant to decide whether the species should still be considered endangered or threatened by analyzing its abundance, genetics, spatial distribution, and habitat.

The analysis of abundance of the Altamaha spinymussel looked back on two recent surveys in its native habitat. The species was not found in either of these surveys, but it is mentioned that they were site-specific and were not optimal habitats for the spinymussel. These surveys show no improvements in the Altamaha spinymussel population since its listing. Furthermore, no recruitment has been recorded in the population since the 1990s.

The genetic analysis of the Altamaha spinymussel found high probability for inbreeding and low genetic diversity. This is primarily due to the small population sizes and fragmentation of their habitat and could pose large problems in the future of the species.

The spatial distribution of the Altamaha spinymussel also relied on the previously mentioned surveys, but neither of the surveys were performed on a wide scale. The surveys were in areas of proposed boat ramp construction and only covered 30 meters (98 feet) of the river. The surveys did not find any Altamaha spinymussel in the area. However, the areas surveyed were not within their preferred habitat. Due to the Altamaha spinymussel brooding for short periods it is unlikely its spatial distribution will change in the future. This is because their eggs are only attached to the host fish for short periods of time and they otherwise can not move locations.

The habitat of the Altamaha spinymussel was damaged due to historic low water levels in the river in 2011 which likely caused a large mussel kill. This low flow also increased recreation and ATV usage in the area which is known to threaten bivalve populations and increase sedimentation. Also, the Ohoopee river, which contained a population of Altamaha spinymussel, was found to have increased mercury levels which were not supporting fish growth. The increased mercury could cause a decline in the Altamaha spinymussel population.

Finally, a 5-factor analysis of threats was created for the Altamaha spinymussel. This analysis found that the major threat to the Altamaha spinymussel was sedimentation from agriculture and mining in the area. Construction may also increase sedimentation in the area which the Altamaha spinymussel is not protected from. The ability of the population to produce viable offspring was also found to be a big concern due to the small and spatially separated population. As the host fish for the Altamaha spinymussel is unknown, no conservation, management, or data collection can be performed. Disease, predation, and overutilization were not found to be threats to the Altamaha spinymussel population. The 5-year review concluded that the Altamaha spinymussel population still met the definition of endangered.

=== Species status assessment ===
The Species Status Assessment for the Altamaha spinymussel was published on June 1, 2021. This assessment found that the spinymussel populations in the Oconee and Lower Altamaha had become locally extinct. The population in the Ohoopee was found to have decreased resiliency due to water quality and quantity. The Ocmulgee population was the only one found to have a moderate resiliency. This assessment also concluded that the redundancy of the population, or number of populations in different areas, was low because 2 of the 4 populations are now locally extinct. Due to the overall small population size and native regions they expect the population to have difficulty adapting to future conditions.

The Species Status Assessment created a predictive model to see how the species would be doing in 20 years. The assessment found that the species would likely become extinct or persist in small populations. If the population was able to persist in small populations, the Ohoopee population would face uncertainty due to the habitat threats posed against it.

The Species Status Assessment also created a 50-year predictive model in the event the species survives in small populations. This assessment found that land use was not likely to be a problem as most of the native area is protected. Water quantity levels are also believed to remain at similar levels in the future, having little impact on the overall population size.

The assessment outlined future conservation work. If the recruitment and reproduction rate are unable to keep up with the mortality rate the species may become functionally extinct. The assessment found that identification of the host fish is one of the most important steps to conservation. By identifying the host fish, researchers believe the Altamaha spinymussel could be bred in captivity allowing for later reintroduction to its native habitats. This would allow the population to grow back to its original levels and allow the extirpated populations in the Lower Altamaha and Oconee river to recover. Without captive breeding these two populations will likely remain locally extinct and the population decline will continue. Future conservation must also include a range wide survey to truly establish the overall Altamaha spinymussel population in order to quantify the decline.

=== Recovery plan ===
There is currently no recovery plan for the Altamaha spinymussel, but the 5-year review established future goals for species conservation. The first goal was to create an adequate recovery plan. Second, a range wide survey in the Altamaha spinymussel native habitat should be conducted to inform future conservation. Additionally, the temperature and flow of the water and substrates in the water should be monitored. Third, there should be strong efforts in identifying host fish populations to help in captive breeding efforts. Finally, the 5-year review believes that a genetic analysis should be conducted on the Altamaha spinymussel. This will inform researchers of species that are similar and can then be used to inform management and conservation decisions.
