= Elliptio folliculata =

Conservation status
- Least Concern (IUCN 3.1)

- Imperiled (NatureServe)

Scientific classification
- Kingdom: Animalia
- Phylum: Mollusca
- Class: Bivalvia
- Order: Unionida
- Family: Unionidae
- Genus: Elliptio
- Species: E. folliculata

Binomial name
- Elliptio folliculata I. Lea, 1838

Species of bivalve

Elliptio folliculata specimen at the Zöologisch Museum, Amsterdam. Photo source: Naturalis Biodiversity Center/Wikimedia Commons

Elliptio folliculata is a species of freshwater mussel, an aquatic bivalve mollusk in the family Unionidae, the river mussels.

This species is endemic to the United States.
