= List of river basins in the United States =

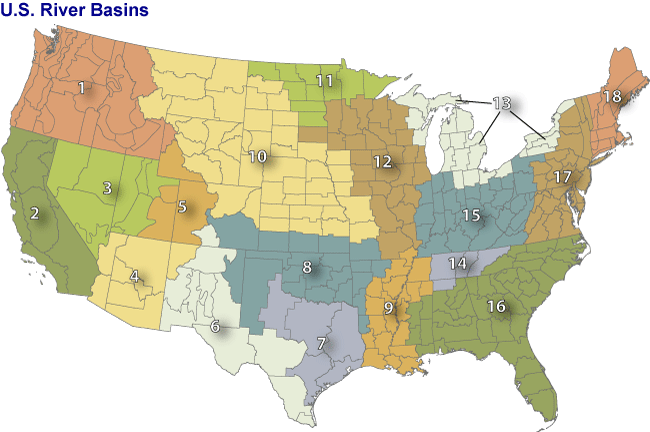
Map of major river basins

These are the major U.S. river basins in the U.S., as designated by the U.S. Water Resources Council. Each of these river basins contain a number of smaller river basins.

== Contiguous ==
- 1. Pacific Northwest Basin
- 2. California River Basin
- 3. Great Basin
- 4. Lower Colorado River Basin
- 5. Upper Colorado River Basin
- 6. Rio Grande River Basin
- 7. Texas Gulf Coast Basin
- 8. Arkansas-White-Red Basin
- 9. Lower Mississippi River Basin
- 10. Missouri River Basin
- 11. Souris-Red-Rainy Basin
- 12. Upper Mississippi Basin
- 13. Great Lakes Basin
- 14. Tennessee River Basin
- 15. Ohio River Basin
- 16. South Atlantic-Gulf Basin
- 17. Mid-Atlantic Basin
- 18. New England Basin

== Alaska ==
- Copper River Basin
- Yukon River Basin

== See also ==
- Drainage basin
- Hydrology
