= Freshwater salinization =

Salty runoff contaminating freshwater ecosystems

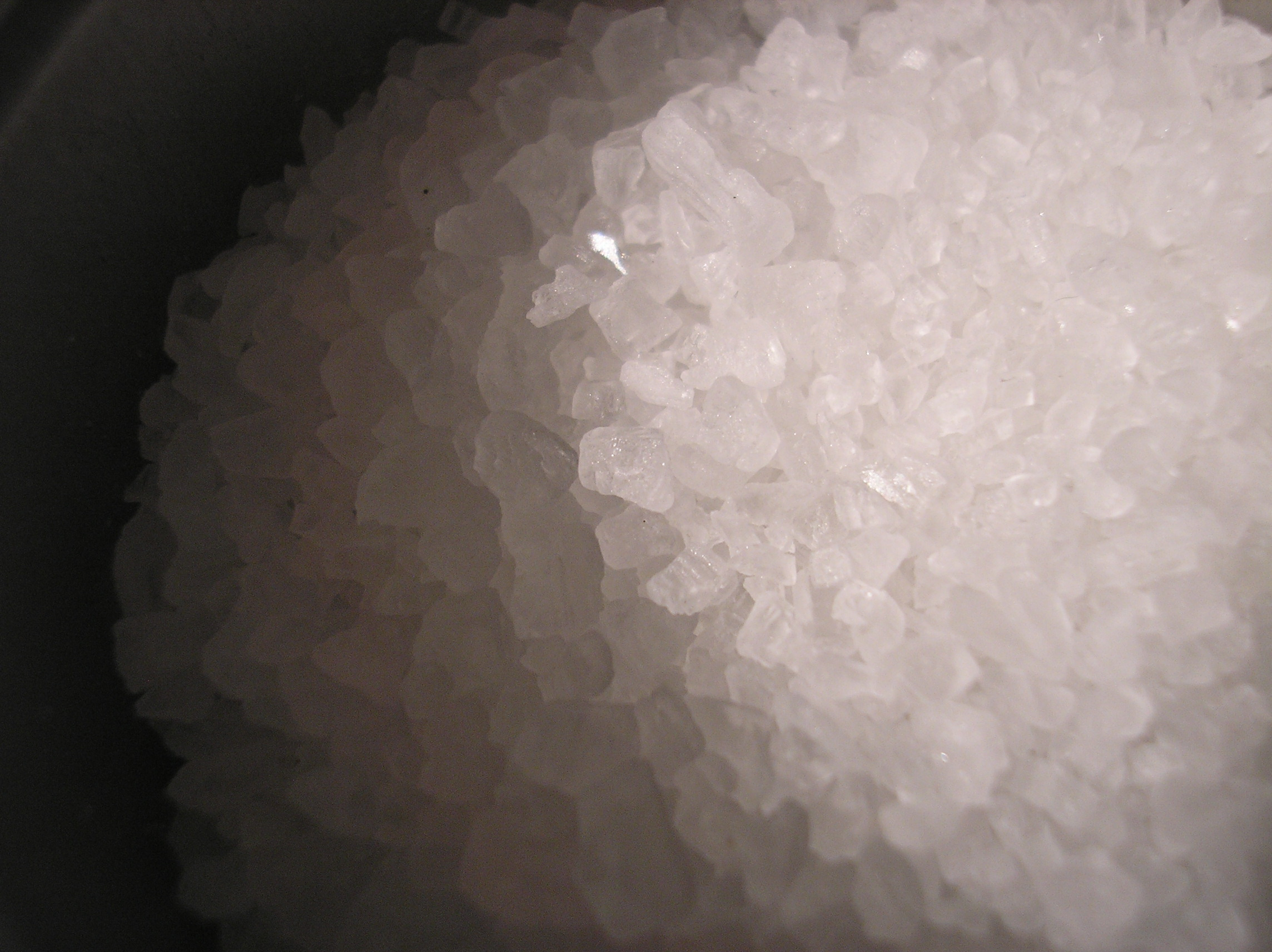
Salt consists of sodium chloride. Through primary and secondary salinization, it intrudes into freshwater and damages the health of humans and other organisms.

Freshwater salinization is the process of salty runoff contaminating freshwater ecosystems, which can harm aquatic species in certain quantities and contaminate drinking water. It is often measured by the increased amount of dissolved minerals than what is considered usual for the area being observed. Naturally occurring salinization is referred to as primary salinization; this includes rainfall, rock weathering, seawater intrusion, and aerosol deposits. Human-induced salinization is termed as secondary salinization, with the use of de-icing road salts as the most common form of runoff. Approximately 37% of the drainage in the United States has been affected by salinization in the past century. The EPA has defined two thresholds for healthy salinity levels in freshwater ecosystems: 230 mg/L Cl^{−} for average salinity levels and 860 mg/L Cl^{−} for acute inputs.

== Primary salinization ==
Salinity plays a major role in a freshwater organism's attempts to maintain an osmotic balance between ion concentration and their internal fluids. Salinization increases osmotic pressure, thus negatively affecting the chance of an organism's fitness and survival. Higher levels of salinity present in freshwater environments can lead to declining species richness in general observations, though toxicity varies among freshwater species and the identity of the ions that are causing the salinization. Excluding an organism's death, excess salinity may also lead to a decrease in both individual and population fitness via stunted growth during adolescence, decreased feeding ability, oxidative stress, and overall bodily disfigurement.

Excess amounts of saline water in freshwater areas also play a significant role on larger population scales; they may alter trophic interactions within ecosystems and transform pre-existing biochemical cycles into 'new' ones by changing the flow of compound direction. The altercation of ecosystems may facilitate the intrusion of invasive species that are able to handle brackish to saline water conditions.

=== Effects on human health ===
Most of the water that humans use and consume everyday originate from freshwater sources. High salt concentrations within drinking water sources can result in many harmful effects on human health. A study on two coastal villages in Bangladesh showed that when freshwater contaminated with high salinity concentrations is consumed, it can result in health issues such as hair loss, skin diseases, gastric problems, diarrhea, and high blood pressure. High salinity levels in drinking water also has been found to be highly associated with cardiovascular diseases (CVD). Freshwaters that are alkaline and salty can also mobilize and release a variety of chemicals that travel together throughout watersheds, contaminate human water sources, and can cause a variety of negative health effects on humans if consumed. These toxic chemicals, often consisting of metals and nitrogen containing compounds, are either forced out of streambed soils by the salt ions, or the salinity within the water corrodes the pipes through passing, releasing the chemicals into the water source. An example of this occurring was in Flint, Michigan. Due to the high salt concentrations in the Flint River water source from nearby road salt runoffs, the water passing through the resident's pipes contributed to corrosion and the release of lead into their drinking water.

== Secondary salinization ==
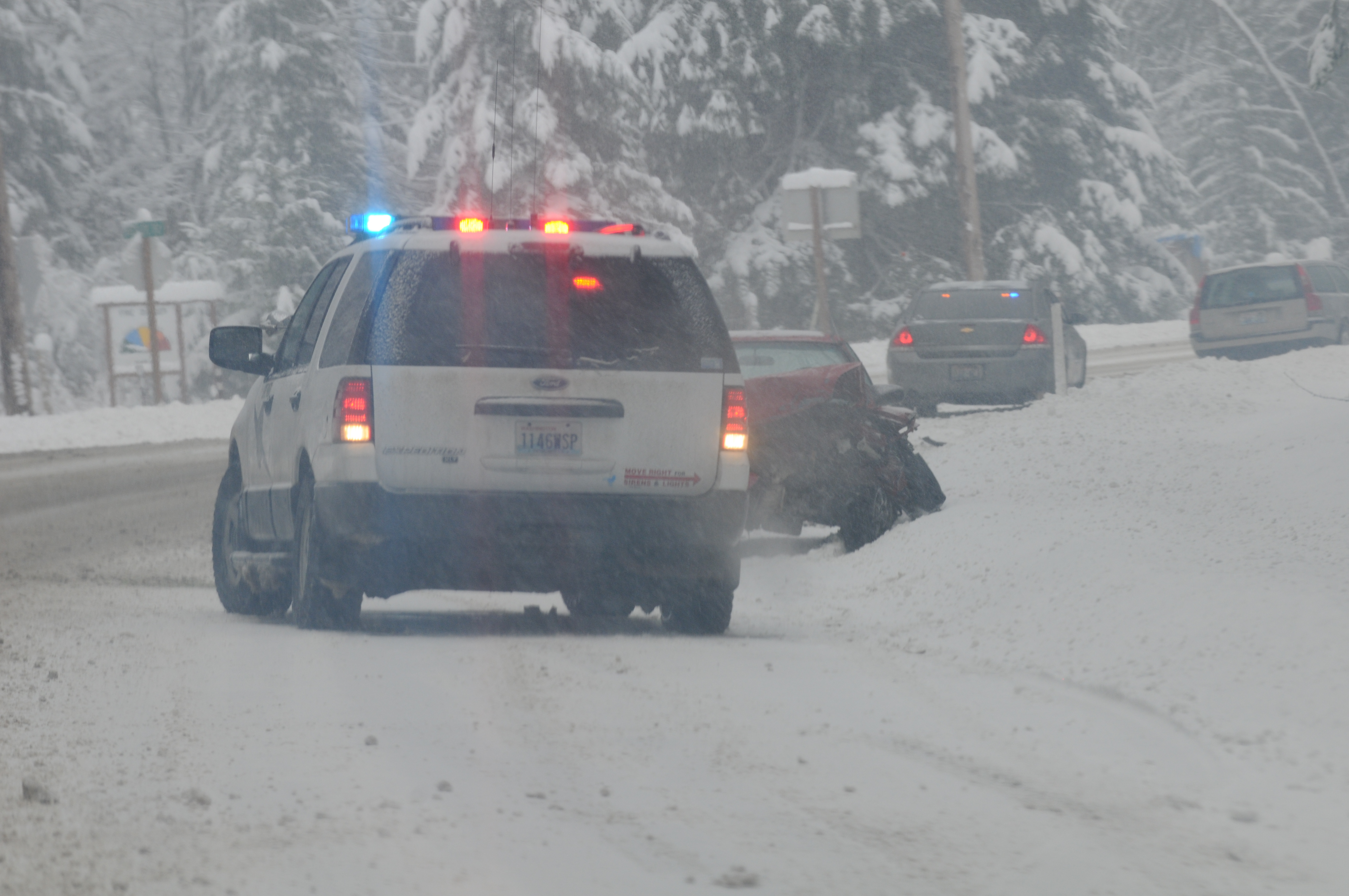
Colder climates use mixtures of salt to keep ice from forming along roads, which increases saline runoff to nearby freshwater locations.

Human interaction accelerates rates of primary salinization. Land development, like construction and mining, causes compounds found in bedrock to be released from their tight locations and come to the surface, which are then exposed to accelerated rates of weathering, eventually leading to leaching ions in nearby water sources. Agricultural practices also generate highly saline irrigation that may enter freshwater through the introduction of various pesticides or husbandry-related runoff, and naturally saline groundwater can be brought to the surface via land clearing.

Chlorine in the form of chloride is recognized as the most common type of anthropogenic salts exposed to an environment. In agricultural practices, chlorine is mixed together with other compounds to produce an antibacterial solvent used to treat water. This treated water moves from fields into watersheds where it may remain present for long periods of time. Aggregation of chlorine is especially prevalent where improper irrigation occurs. Raised chloride levels may lead to acidification, movement of metalloid compounds via ion exchange with the stream bed, tampering with lake mixing schedules, and modifications of freshwater biotic relationships.

=== Effects on freshwater organisms ===
Due to body permeability, the salinity of the organism's aquatic environment can have a huge influence on cellular stability. Organisms residing in freshwater ecosystems need to maintain an osmotic balance between their body fluids and the ion concentrations within their cells. Changes in osmotic pressure requires large amounts of energy and can result in cellular damage and cellular death within the organisms. Changes within salinity levels affect organisms within freshwater ecosystems both directly and indirectly. The toxic levels of salt ions can directly result in physiological changes in species which can cause harmful effects to not only the individual, but also the species population. The various effects on these organisms can then indirectly affect the overall freshwater ecosystem by modifying the aquatic community structure and function. As salinity increases within a freshwater ecosystem, often this results in a decrease of biota diversity and richness. The extinction rate for freshwater organisms are among the highest worldwide, and as salinity levels in these aquatic ecosystems continue to increase, more species and their environments will become threatened.

Freshwater salinization can negatively effect the species richness, diversity, and community composition across multiple trophic levels. Competitive interactions between zooplankton can change as salinity increases, leading species such as Simocephalus vetulus to outcompete the normally-dominant Daphnia galeata under high salinity treatments. Species richness and diversity declines as salinity increases for most macro-invertebrate species as well. Mayflies, stoneflies, and caddisflies, which are considered to be good indicators of stream health, exhibited particularly sharp declines due to increased salinity. Some fish species are negatively affected by salinization. In the lower Pecos River, 13 of the 44 native fish species have disappeared in areas of high salinization. However, some fish only exhibit declines when salinity reaches extreme levels.

A study performed in Baltimore revealed that at low concentrations, increased levels of chloride hinders the denitrification process within lakes, which is crucial for removing nitrate, the byproduct of ammonia from fish and other aquatic organisms. Chloride levels in the Northeastern USA increase seasonally to around 5 grams a liter from street salt use in the winter. This vacillation causes freshwater communities closer to urban areas to have reduced biodiversity and trophic complexity.

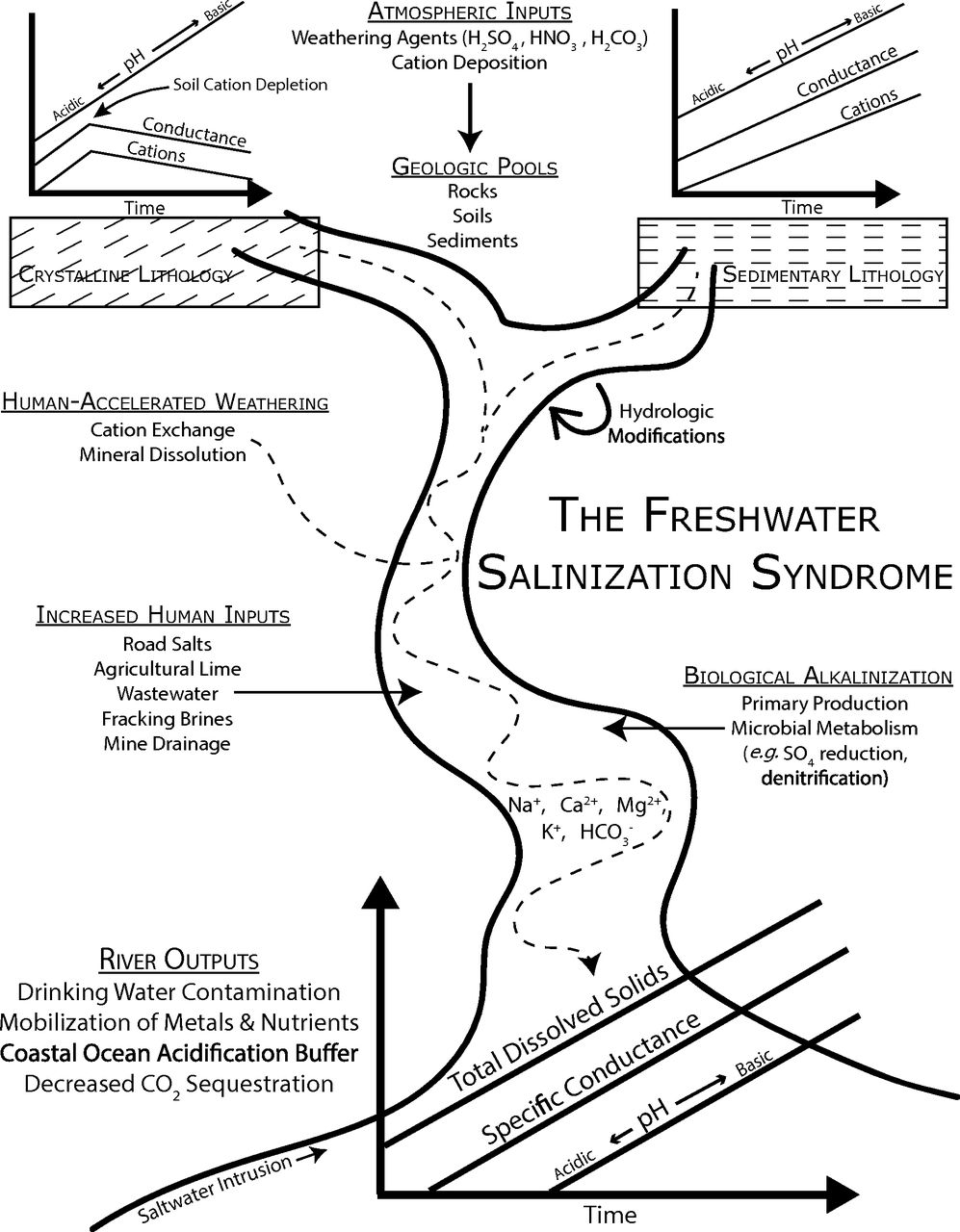
A depiction of freshwater salinization syndrome (FSS). Many different factors contribute to FSS, making it difficult for scientist to quantify. Anthropogenic and biological outputs mix together to create unique effects in freshwater systems.

=== Biomodification of salt toxicity ===
Due to numerous concurrent stressors present in freshwater communities, increased levels of salinization may have unforeseen effects caused by interactions with other compounds. Freshwater salinization syndrome (FSS) is cited to be a familiar threat to freshwater located in North America and Europe. The interactions between salt and pH, nutrients, metals, and base cations is not adequately known, though may exacerbate existing issues to negatively effect water quality, carbon dioxide concentrations, and biodiversity. The ion concentration of salt toxicity may change the level of reactivity a species will respond with. To be able to properly recognize the threat salinity plays requires the proper proportions of each ion present to be accounted for. Sensitivity also varies between species. Studies focusing on the abiotic interactions with freshwater organisms found that salinity had an additive effect on the detrimental compounds being observed for the majority of the time, but not always, which makes the prediction process difficult for scientists.

Salinization and alkalization have been linked through the study of arid regions across North America and have negatively affected 37% and 90% of freshwater drainage areas, respectively. Their interaction is best noted by the levels of rising pH in streams and rivers measured in 232 USGS sites in 2018. Among these sites, 66% have shown a significant escalation of pH, the most commonly affected area being heavily populated cities in the east and mid-west. Along with the usual salinization offenders of agricultural runoff and road ice, lime and concrete quickly weather down to contribute base ions and salts into water streams. Noticeable signs of FSS include infrastructure deterioration, lowered biodiversity, and the increased mobilization of pollutants within an aquatic system. In conjunction with photosynthetic organisms, basic levels of pH can enter a positive feedback loop via the deficiency of dissolved carbons in the water in relation to the amount of dissolved carbon dioxide, thus further exacerbating FSS.

=== Prevention and remediation ===
Remediation may occur by creating a national standardized database where local governments and companies can report the quantity and chemical concentration of the road salts released for de-icing purposes. This would help regulate and monitor the ions being released into the environment so nearby freshwater sources can be monitored for exposure more carefully. There also needs to be a standardized reference developed by reputable scientists that shows what the average expected levels of salt ions for a normal freshwater ecosystem are. A Canadian study suggested the use of halophyte plants to help remediate the salt exposure within the soils and prevent its infiltration into groundwater. Halophytes are plants that have a high salt tolerance, and the purpose of the study was to see if they could be planted around areas with high road salt usages to prevent infiltration into water sources. The results showed that when the surrounding soil was tested, 11% of Cl ions and 87% of Na ions were retained within the top soil layers when halophytes were present. This shows potential in preventing road salt runoff from accessing freshwater sources. If halophytes were planted around freshwater sources, salt ions would be less likely to run into freshwater sources, and salinity could be limited or prevented. In regards to other harmful human practices such as mining, conservationists and volunteers are planting species of native Appalachian trees and plants on sites used previously for mining activities. Replanting these native plants will hopefully remediate the land that was destroyed by the mountaintop mining practices and increase the biodiversity in Appalachia. The red spruce was one native species that was reintroduced due to its important ability to filter and capture water from a deep organic layer within its surrounding soil. 90% of the red spruce trees planted survived, which shows promise towards remediation efforts through the use of native species.
