= Yukon River Basin =

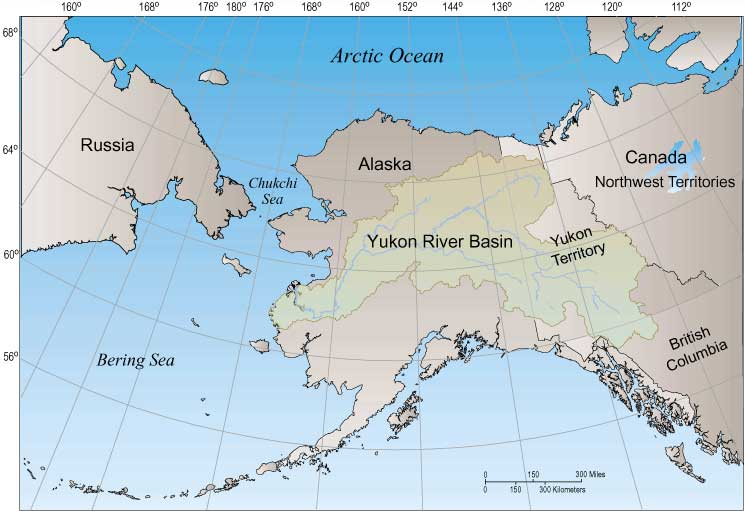
- The location of the Basin is between Alaska and Yukon Territory

Physical characteristics
- Source
  - location: Alaska and The Yukon Territory
- Basin size: 330,000 square miles (850,000 km^{2})

Basin features
- River system: Yukon River
- Population: 126,000 indigenous peoples

The Yukon River Basin is located between the Yukon Territory in Canada and Alaska in the United States, with a small portion in British Columbia, Canada. This basin is made up of 13 other individual basins that drain into the Yukon River and other adjoining rivers and tributaries. The Yukon River Basin is 330,000 square miles (850,000 km^{2}) in area and 1,980 miles (3,190 km) in length. Many different geological features make up the basin, including several types of terrain, shrubland, and rivers.

In the mid to late 1800s, European and American explorers discovered its natural resources and began settling in the region. The Yukon River Basin remains a relatively intact ecosystem, known for its density of salmon, which are used as both food for the villagers and a growing industry for the community.

== History ==
Some of the oldest known humans who inhabited North America are thought to have lived around the western part of the Yukon Basin. They migrated across the land bridge, Beringia, living without influence from other cultures for hundreds of years.

The earliest exploration and European settlement in the Yukon River Basin was by Robert Campbell in 1840. Early explorers like Campbell came not for gold but for furs. In the 1870s, explorers like Leroy McQuesten, Arthur Harper, and Alfred Mayo discovered how plentiful the Yukon river and Yukon River basin was with minerals. Their mining ventures grew and spread until they reached the Stewart River, where they found gold, starting the Klondike Gold Rush.

== Geography ==
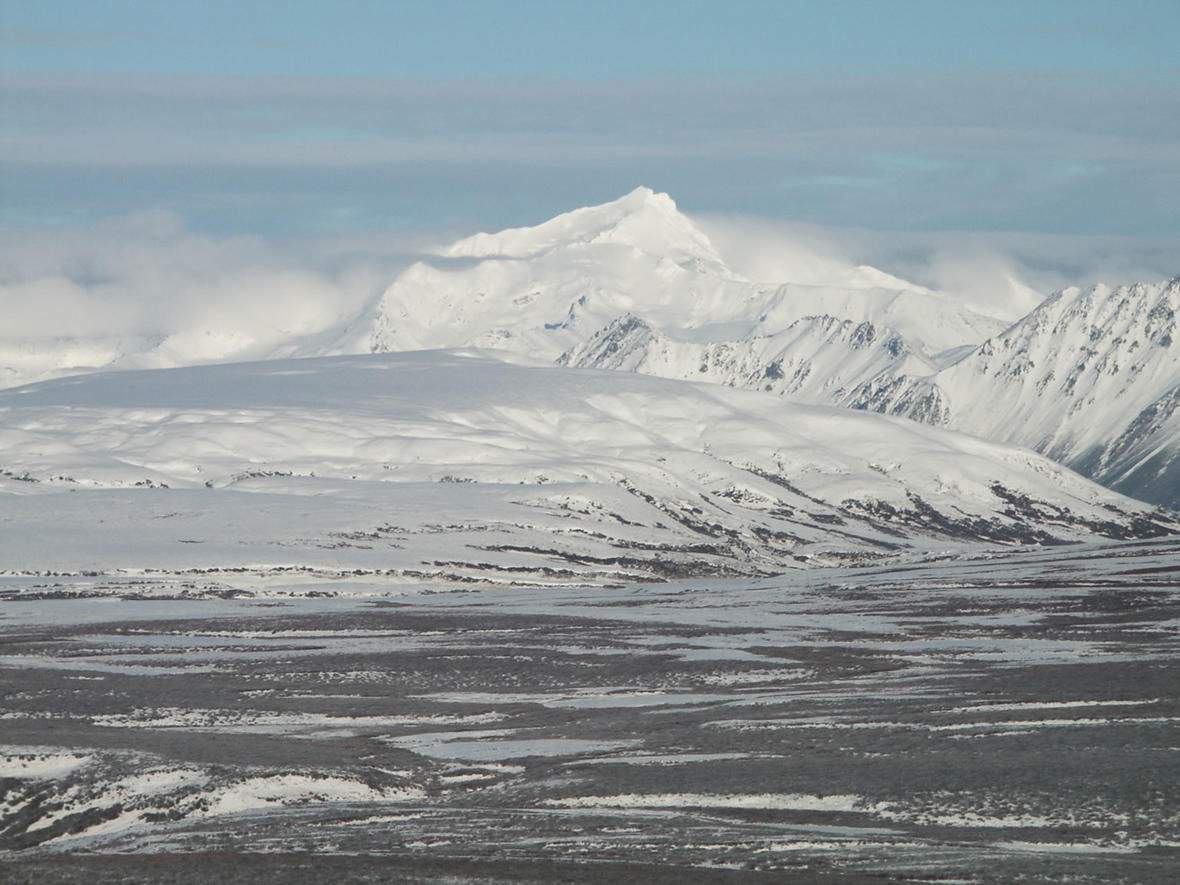
The Alaskan Range is part of the topography in the Yukon River Basin. The mountains range from 6,000 to 9,000 feet (1,800 to 2,700 m) in elevation.

The Yukon River Basin is approximately 330,000 square miles (850,000 km^{2}) in area and 1,980 miles (3,190 km) in length. This makes the Yukon River Basin the fourth largest basin in North America. It is located between the Rocky Mountains in the north and the Pacific Mountain system to the south. The Basin spans across Canada in the Yukon Territory and the US state of Alaska. The Yukon Flats basin is south of the Yukon River Basin and it drains deposits and reworked materials into the Flats. It is within the Arctic Complex of the Arctic-Atlantic Bioregion, therefore has freshwater.

The Yukon River Basin is made up of 13 other individual basins and stretches across two countries: the United States of America and Canada. The topography of the Yukon Basin is diverse with different elevations. While there are 13 individual basins within the Basin, there are also 5 physio-graphic regions. They include Alaska Range (6,000–9,000 feet or 1,800–2,700 metres), Central and Eastern Brooks Range (7,000–8,000 feet or 2,100–2,400 metres), Indian River Uplands (1,500–2,000 feet or 460–610 metres), Innoko Lowlands (flat flood plains), and Kolkrine-Hodzana Highlands (2,000–4,000 feet or 610–1,220 metres).

=== Geology ===
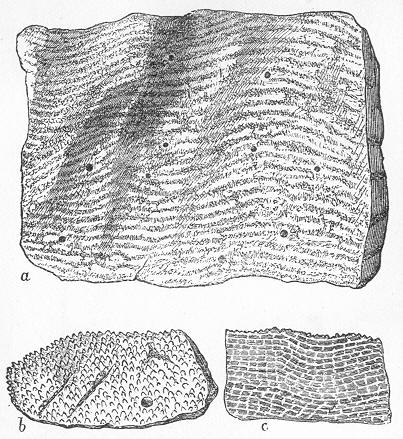
Limestone is a type of sedimentary rock found in Canada, where half the Yukon River Basin is located

Half of the Yukon River Basin lies in Canada, with the other half occupying space in Alaska. The Yukon River Basin is made up of many different geological terrains, with a variety of different rocks that make up the basin itself. These include various types of sedimentary, igneous, and metamorphic rocks There are several different land types that make up the entirety of the Yukon River Basin. These include the needleleaf forest, tall and low shrublands, broadleaf forest, lichens, barren, wet herbaceous, dwarf shrublands, dry herbaceous, ice/snow, and rivers, streams, and lakes. There are also many different types of soils that make up the Yukon River Basin. These soils include Entisols, Gelisols, Inceptisols, Inceptisols/Gelisols, Mollisols, Spodosols, and Rough Mountainous Land.

Permafrost dominates the Yukon River Basin. Because of the level of permafrost in the basin, the basin itself is far more prone to flash floods. The melting of permafrost is believed to be one of the reasons that the Yukon River Basin's flow has increased over the years, causing erosion of the basin.

=== Hydrology ===
The Yukon River Basin drains from east to west, with the temperature of the water increasing as the water flows down stream. The water, fish, and other animals throughout the basin are used by local inhabitants for various reasons, which is why it is very important that the quality of the water be checked often and be healthy. Water quality varies from site to site throughout the Yukon River Basin, for example the density throughout the eastern and southern sites of the basin is much more prominent than that of the western and northern cities. Because of its northern location, the Yukon River Basin is frozen over for nearly 8 months out of the year.

== Climate ==
The climate around the Yukon River Basin varies because of factors like its topography and large size. This large area covers land from Alaska and from parts of the Yukon Territory in Canada. The precipitation over the entire basin is approximately 19 inches (480 mm) per year. With the diverse topography certain places receive more rain than others. Some areas receive less than 10 inches (250 mm) of rainfall a year and others receive up to 50 inches (1,300 mm). With that being said, annual rainfall is greater on tall, rugged mountains than on flat lowland areas of the whole region. The average temperature now for the Yukon River Basin is approximately 30 °C (86 °F) in the summer and −40 °C (−40 °F) in the winter. However, the region has some of the most extreme temperature changes for an area that is located in a continental zone.

=== Climate change ===
Recent studies indicate that temperatures have been steadily rising throughout the region since the 1840s. Climate change has been a serious, on-going issue throughout the Yukon River Basin and other surrounding areas. With drier, hotter temperatures, there have been more forest fires and melting permafrost, which leads to changes in water flows. The recent change in climate has also taken a toll on the Yukon River basin, such as flooding in 2009 due to the above average snow and ice levels, followed by and abnormal high spring temperatures. Rapid melting of the ice and snow flooding, erosion, and damage from debris along the river. Not only has the climate change affected the Yukon river and the Yukon river basin but, it has also affected the watershed as a whole.

== Ecosystems ==
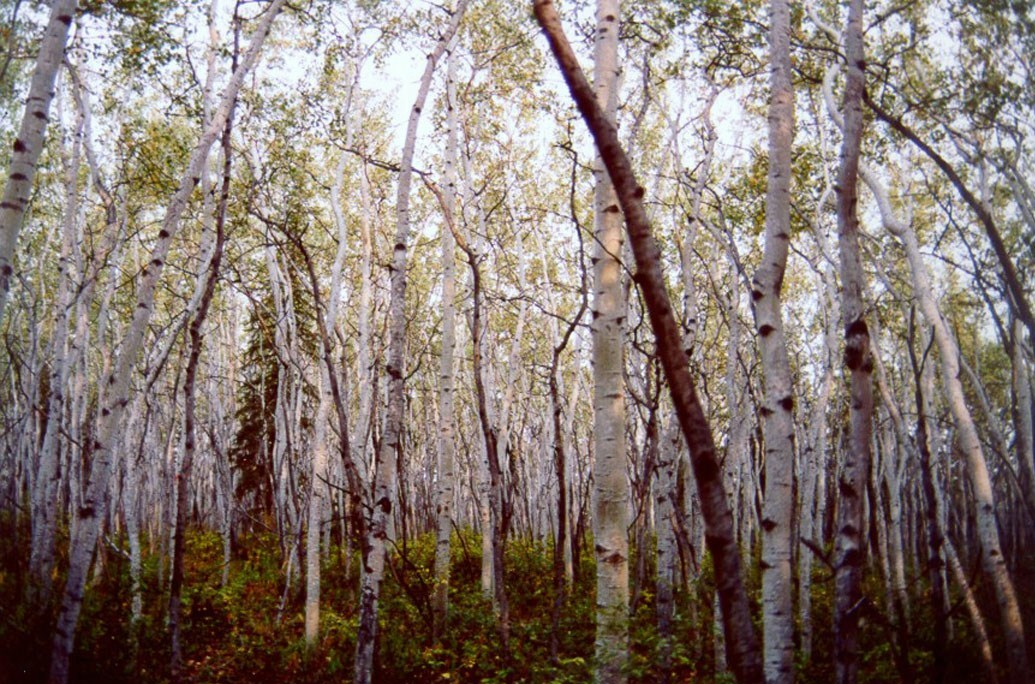
Aspen forest located near the Yukon River Basin, in a physiographic region called the Yukon Flats

The Yukon River Basin has a relatively intact ecosystem. It is a quality habitat for birds, mammal, fish, invertebrates, and one amphibian. The wood frog is the only amphibian able to survive in the ecosystem. This is due to its increased level of glucose in its cells. This addition acts as an antifreeze. It allows the frogs to survive the extremely cold winters. The basin consists of thousands of lakes, ponds, sloughs, wetlands, and rivers/streams to provide habitats for these animals. Within the basin there are more than 150 bird species, 40 mammals, and 18 fish species. There is an estimated 1.5 million ducks that breed here annually. It is also home to the longest salmon runs in history. Plant life includes white spruce, paper birch, and quaking aspen forests, willow and alder thickets, grasslands, and meows. In these areas are where the animals of the ecosystem thrive.

=== Salmon ===
The Yukon River Basin is home to the longest salmon runs in history. Salmon from this area are prized for their rich oily meat. This is due to the large fat reserves that they must build up in order to make the long journey up the Yukon River. A few examples of these prized salmon would be of the chinook, coho and chum salmon species.

Not only are the salmon prized for their meat, but also as an economic resource for villages in the area. In these areas the salmon are typically dried, smoked, and frozen. Without these salmon runs it is possible that the ecosystem might not thrive. Therefore, the fisheries are managed by the Alaska Department of Fish and Game along with other national and international treaties.

Many studies have been done to watch the migratory patterns of the salmon. In one particular study researchers studied the migratory patterns of wild chinook salmon. They did this by capturing and tagging adult chinook salmon from June to mid July in the lower Yukon river. The tagged fish had radio transmitters, which were used to track the salmon and their migration patterns throughout the Yukon river. This data was then used to monitor the salmon in the river system.

Table 1:
| Category (year) | 2002 | 2003 | 2004 | All Years |
| Start of Tagging | 9 June | 3 June | 3 June | 3-9 June |
| End of Tagging | 13 July | 14 July | 19 July | 13-19 July |
| Captured | 1, 310 | 2,312 | 2,107 | 5,729 |
| Tagged | 768 | 1,097 | 995 | 2,860 |
| Moved Up River | 751 | 1,081 | 958 | 2,790 |
| Tracked Past Multiple Stations | 683 | 1,050 | 893 | 2,626 |
| Typical Pattern | 666 | 1,031 | 863 | 2,560 |

This is data regarding Chinook salmon migration in the Yukon river.

== Demographics ==
The Yukon River Basin has 4 towns/cities and 43 villages, with approximately 126,000 currently inhabitants. Of those, 10 percent still rely solely on the land and 83 percent are indigenous. In the towns of Dawson and Faro, there are 1,000-2,000 residents. The city Whitehorse has over 23,000 residents, while Fairbanks had around 84,000 residents. Villages around the basin hold anywhere from 30 to 800 people.
