= Nutrient depletion =

Nutrient depletion is a form of resource depletion and refers to the loss of nutrients and micronutrients in a habitat or parts of the biosphere, most often the soil (soil depletion, soil degradation). On the level of a complete ecological niche or ecosystem, nutrient depletion can also come about via the loss of the nutrient substrate (soil loss, wetland loss, etc.). However, nutrient depletion can also happen within organisms, as nutrients are usually the first link in the food chain. Thus, a loss of nutrients in a habitat will affect nutrient cycling and eventually the entire food chain. The end result of nutrient depletion is nutrient deficiency, or the lack of key resources within a medium.

Nutrient depletion can refer to shifts in the relative nutrient composition and overall nutrient quantity (i.e. food abundance). Human activity has changed the natural environment extensively, usually with negative effects on wildlife flora and fauna.

The opposite effect is known as eutrophication or nutrient pollution. Both depletion and eutrophication lead to shifts in biodiversity and species abundance (usually a decline). The effects are bidirectional in that a shift in species composition in a habitat may also lead to shift in the nutrient composition.

== Sources ==
Nutrient depletion can be caused by overuse of land and soil, such as from excessive farming, unbalanced soil nutrition, or climate change, which can destroy helpful bacteria and soil components. Nutrient pollution causes provides too much of a specific element while lacking others, so other resources are drained while one remains abundant. For example, algae and seagrass thrive on high nitrogen quantities, but they block sunlight and consume oxygen that other plants and organisms need. Genetic engineering and selective breeding are also major sources of nutrient depletion. Genetically modified organisms (GMOs) can have reduced health benefits in exchange for a better appearance, faster growth, or higher yield.

== Impacts ==
The most notable impact of nutrient depletion is on dirt and farming. Soil depletion stunts plant growth because it lacks the nutrients and resources required for plants to flourish. Plants can obtain carbon dioxide from the atmosphere, which has a higher amount of it because of global warming, but crops also need other ingredients like zinc, iron, and protein, which are more limited and are being used by other plants. Using the same fertilizer and growing the same crop every year on the same land yields decreasing returns.

Nutrient depletion impacts humans through malnourishment and economic health. If plants fail to receive these elements, organisms lower on the food chain, including humans, will not either. Without these nutrients, organisms weaken and deteriorate; for example, the immune system needs zinc to ward off infections, and iron is used in hemoglobin and is required for growth. Research has also found a correlation between the economy and soil fertility, demonstrating that population pressure on the environment affects a nation's economic health.

Ecosystems are also influenced by nutrient depletion. Overfarming can turn fertile soil into barren land within a few years, creating land that cannot sustain life. Additionally, if nutrient pollution upsets the balance of resources in an ecosystem, some species are outcompeted and die off, decreasing biodiversity and allowing for dangerous species to dominate that area. For example, aquatic algal blooms grow quickly when nitrogen and phosphorus are abundant, and they kill other plants, especially those underwater, by blocking sunlight and consuming large amounts of oxygen upon death. Many algal blooms are also harmful to fish, mammals, and humans when consumed, contaminating water sources for nearby communities and ecosystems.

== See also ==
- Soil nutrient
- Soil erosion
