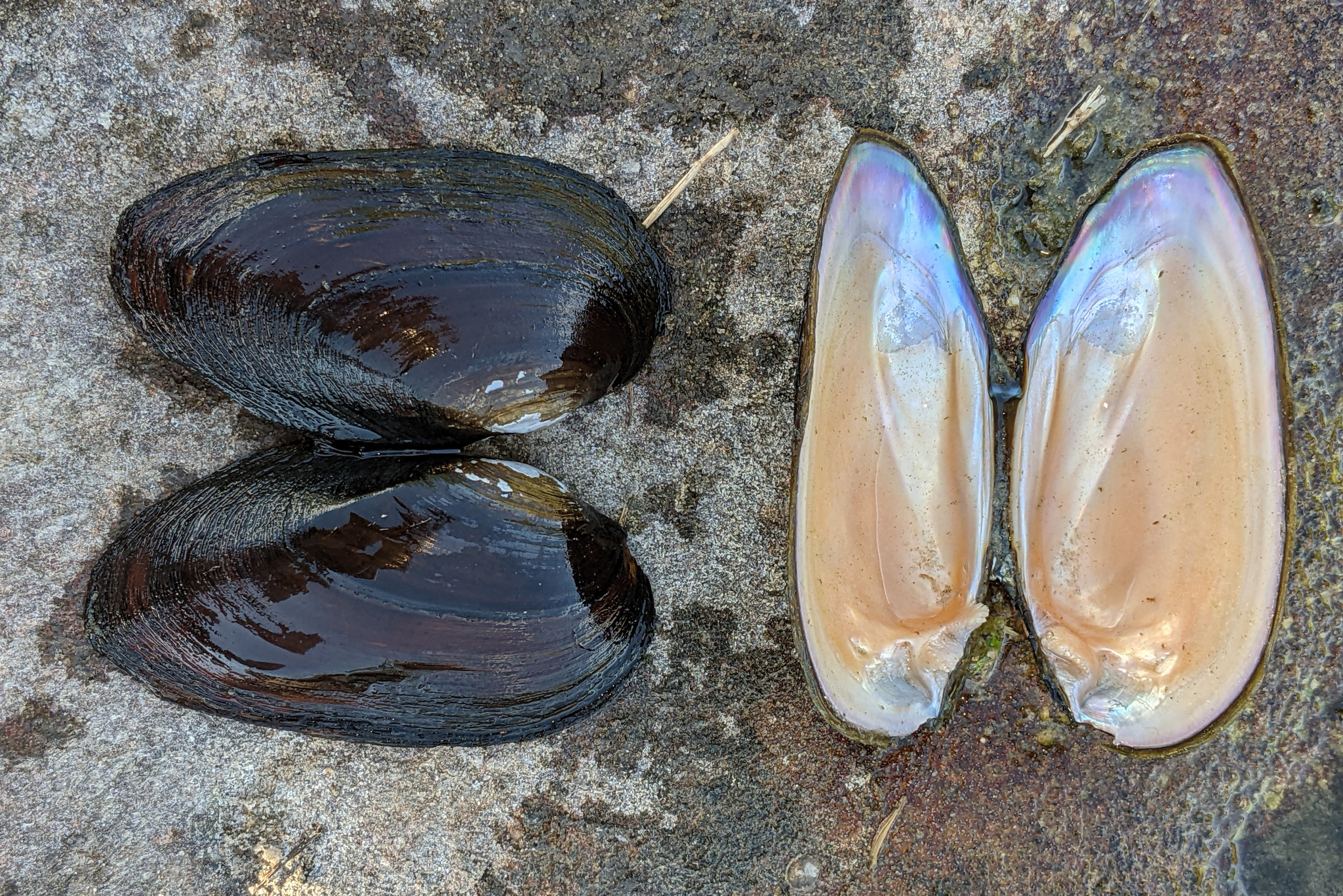
- Elliptio jayensis

Scientific classification
- Kingdom: Animalia
- Phylum: Mollusca
- Class: Bivalvia
- Order: Unionida
- Family: Unionidae
- Tribe: Pleurobemini
- Genus: Elliptio; Rafinesque, 1819

Species
- 43 species (see text)

= Elliptio =

Genus of bivalves

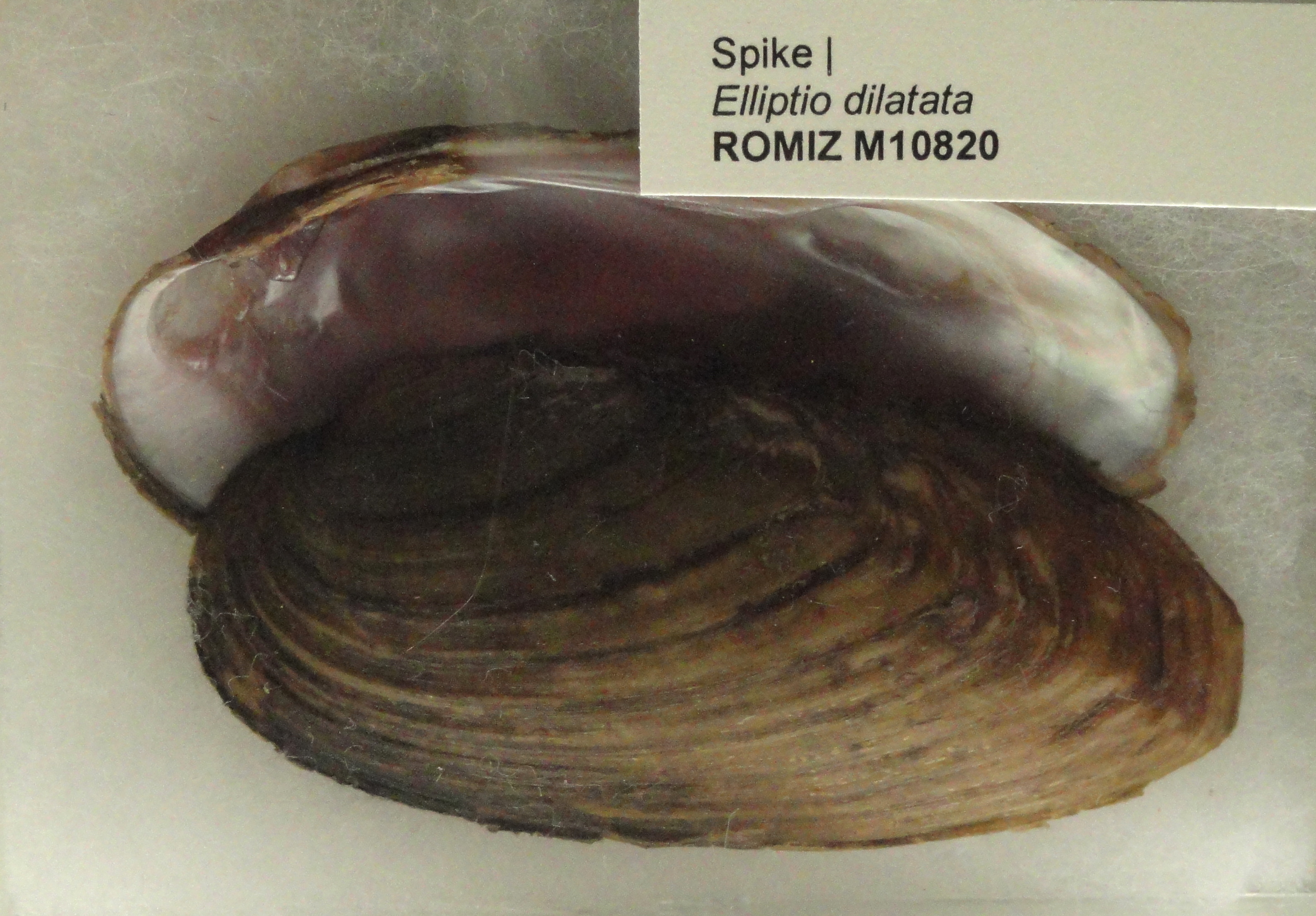
Elliptio dilatata museum specimen

Elliptio is a genus of medium- to large-sized freshwater mussels, aquatic bivalve mollusks in the family Unionidae, commonly known as the unionids, freshwater mussels or naiads.

In contrast with many other groups of American Unionidae, the Elliptio species reach their greatest diversity in the Atlantic-draining rivers of Georgia and the Carolinas, and large parts of Florida. One species ranges north into New England and southern Canada, and two occur in the interior Mississippi drainages. Most Elliptio species have elongated shells, with silvery or purplish interior nacre beneath a thick periostracum, and few reach large size or thickness.

The genus name Elliptio refers to the elliptical shape of these bivalves.

As of 2023 there are 43 species in the genus.

== Species ==
The following species are recognised in the genus Elliptio:

- Elliptio ahenea (I. Lea, 1843)
- †Elliptio albertensis (Whiteaves, 1885)
- Elliptio angustata (I. Lea, 1831) – Carolina lance
- Elliptio arca (Conrad, 1834) – Alabama spike
- Elliptio arctata (Conrad, 1834)
- Elliptio chipolaensis (B. Walker, 1905) – Chipola slabshell
- Elliptio cistellaeformis (I. Lea, 1863)
- †Elliptio clinopisthus (C. A. White, 1882)
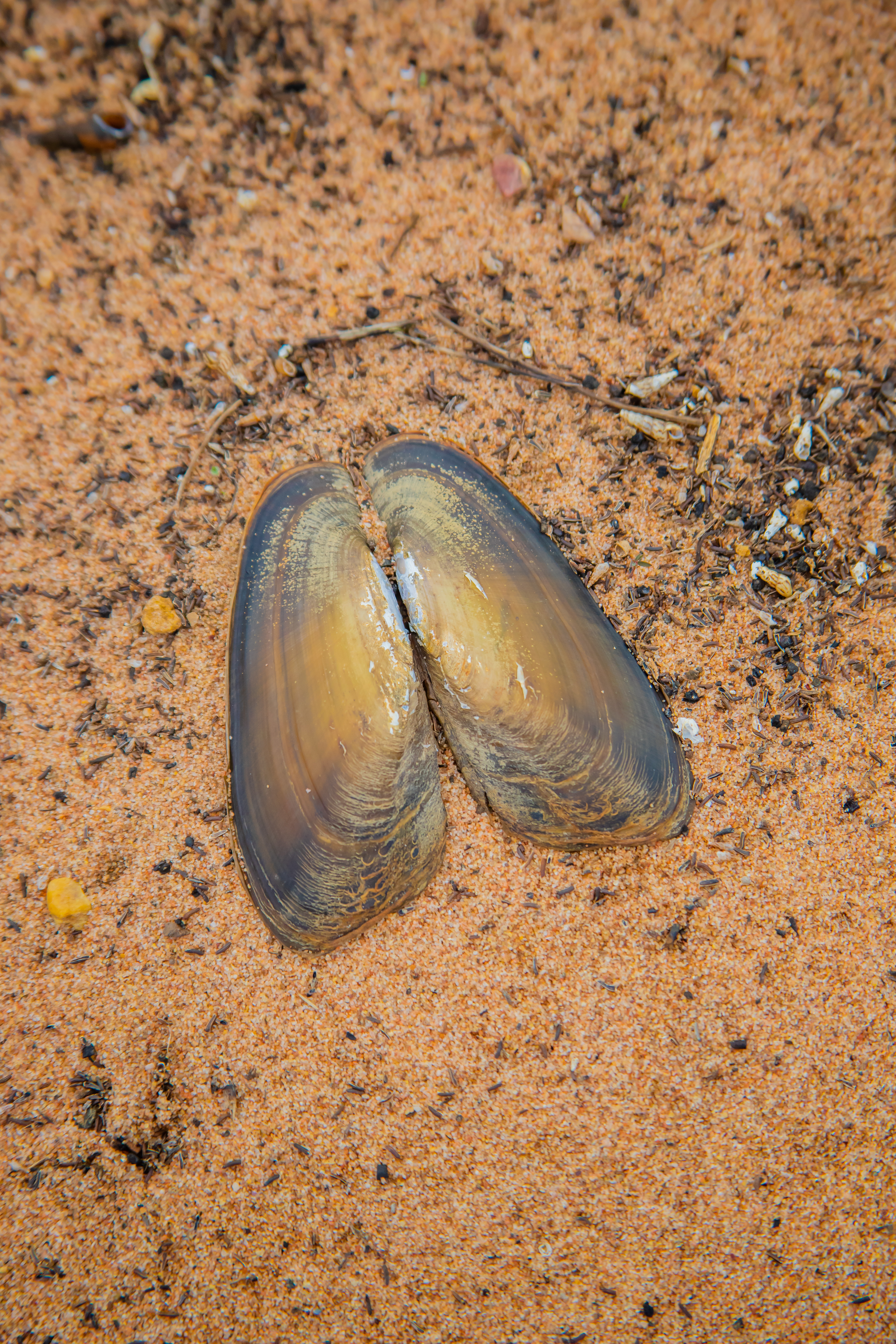
- Elliptio at Lake Volta
  Elliptio complanata ([Lightfoot], 1786) – Eastern elliptio
- Elliptio congaraea (I. Lea, 1831)
- †Elliptio cornelliana (Maury, 1902)
- Elliptio crassidens (Lamarck, 1819) – Elephantear
- Elliptio dariensis (I. Lea, 1842)
- Elliptio downiei (I. Lea, 1858) – Satilla elephantear
- Elliptio fisheriana (I. Lea, 1838)
- Elliptio folliculata (I. Lea, 1838) – pod lance
- Elliptio fraterna (I. Lea, 1852) – brother spike
- Elliptio fumata (I. Lea, 1857)
- †Elliptio haydeni (Meek, 1860)
- †Elliptio hoelzli Modell, 1943
- Elliptio hopetonensis (I. Lea, 1838) – Altamaha slabshell
- †Elliptio hubbardii (Gabb, 1869)
- Elliptio icterina (Conrad, 1834) – variable spike
- Elliptio jayensis (I. Lea, 1838)
- Elliptio judithae A. H. Clarke, 1986
- Elliptio lanceolata (I. Lea, 1827) – yellow lance
- †Elliptio larteti (Noulet, 1846)
- Elliptio marsupiobesa Fuller, 1972
- Elliptio mcmichaeli Clench & R. D. Turner, 1956 – fluted elephantear
- Elliptio monroensis (I. Lea, 1843)
- †Elliptio mormonum La Rocque, 1960
- †Elliptio nanaimoensis (Whiteaves, 1901)
- Elliptio nasutidus (I. Lea, 1863)
- Elliptio nigella (I. Lea, 1852) – recovery pearly mussel, winged spike
- Elliptio occulta (I. Lea, 1843)
- †Elliptio pachyodon Pilsbry, 1953
- Elliptio producta (Conrad, 1836) – Atlantic spike
- Elliptio pullata (I. Lea, 1857)
- Elliptio purpurella (I. Lea, 1857)
- Elliptio roanokensis (I. Lea, 1838) – Roanoke slabshell
- †Elliptio salissiensis L. S. Russell, 1952
- Elliptio shepardiana (I. Lea, 1834) – Altamaha lance
- Elliptio spinosa (I. Lea, 1836) – Altamaha spinymussel, Georgia spinymussel
- †Elliptio washakiensis (Meek, 1871)
