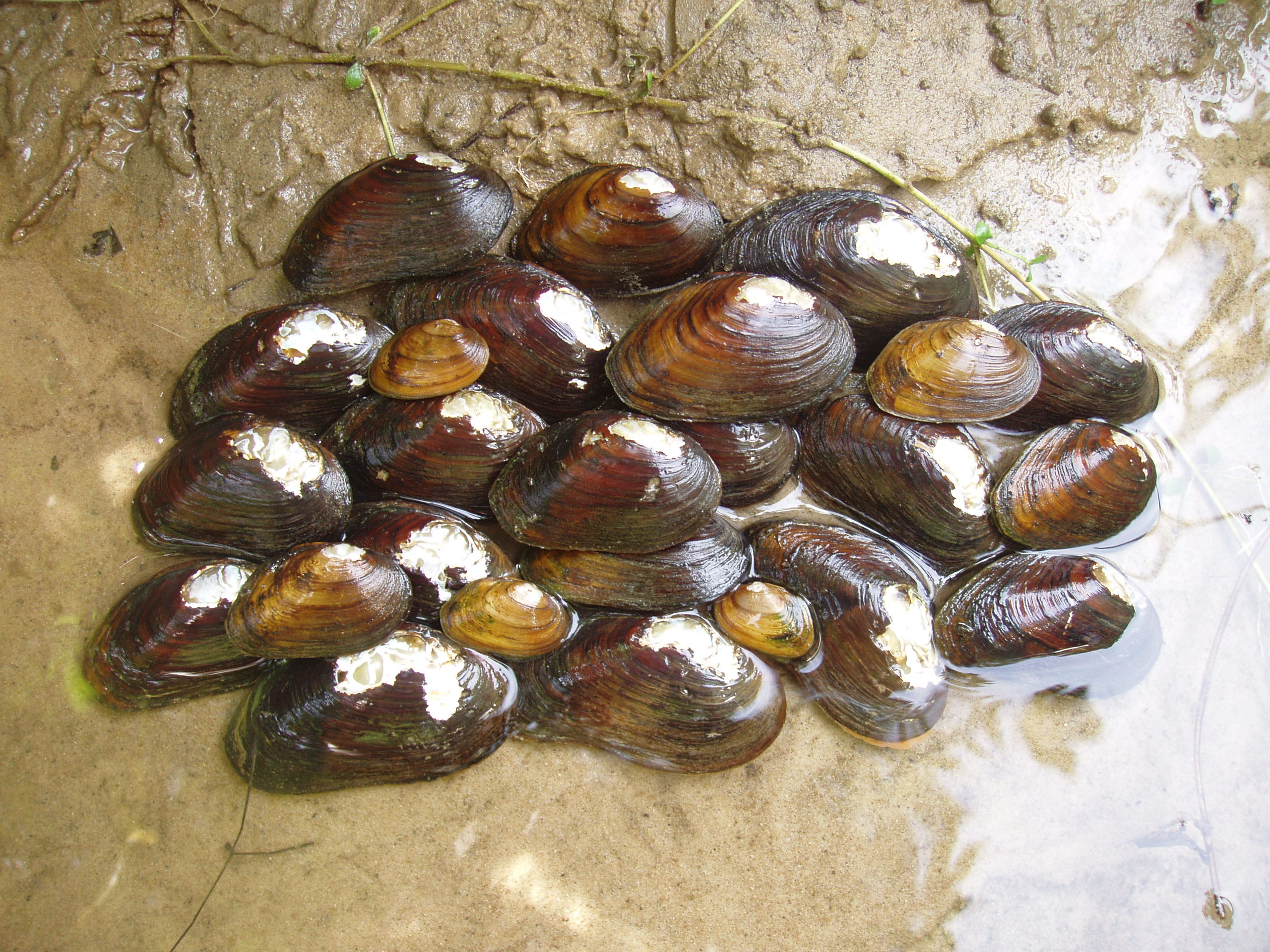

Conservation status
- Critically Endangered (IUCN 2.3)

- Endangered (ESA)

Scientific classification
- Kingdom: Animalia
- Phylum: Mollusca
- Class: Bivalvia
- Order: Unionida
- Family: Unionidae
- Genus: Parvaspina
- Species: P. collina

Binomial name
- Parvaspina collina (Conrad, 1837)

Synonyms
- Elliptio collina (Conrad, 1837); Fusconaia collina (Conrad, 1837); Canthyria collina (Conrad, 1837); Unio collinus Conrad, 1837; Pleurobema collina (Conrad, 1837)

= James River spinymussel =

Species of bivalve

The James River spinymussel (Parvaspina collina), also known as the Virginia spinymussel, is a species of freshwater mussel in the family Unionidae, the river mussels. This species is native to North Carolina, Virginia, and West Virginia in the United States. It is federally listed as an endangered species of the United States. It was formerly placed in the genus Pleurobema but in 2017, Perkins, Johnson & Gangloff placed the species in Parvaspina on account of genetic data and its lateral spines.
