= IUCN Red List near threatened species (Animalia) =

Animal classification system

On 29 January 2010, the IUCN Red List of Threatened Species identified 2657 near threatened species, subspecies, stocks and sub-populations in the Animalia kingdom.

== Annelida ==
=== Hirudinoidea ===
==== Arhynchobdellae ====
===== Hirudinidae =====
- Hirudo medicinalis

=== Oligochaeta ===
==== Haplotaxida ====
===== Lutodrilidae =====
- Lutodrilus multivesiculatus

== Arthropoda ==
=== Arachnida ===
==== Araneae ====
===== Clubionidae =====
- Clubiona hitchinsi

===== Nephilidae =====
- Clitaetra thisbe

===== Oonopidae =====
- Brignolia bowleri

===== Salticidae =====
- Microbianor nigritarsus

===== Theraphosidae =====
- Brachypelma smithi
- Thrigmopoeus truculentus

===== Theridiidae =====
- Spinembolia clabnum

=== Branchiopoda ===
==== Anostraca ====
===== Chirocephalidae =====
- Linderiella occidentalis

=== Diplopoda ===
==== Sphaerotheriida ====
===== Arthrosphaeridae =====
- Sphaeromimus andohahela
- Zoosphaerium album
- Zoosphaerium amabile
- Zoosphaerium analavelona
- Zoosphaerium bambusoides
- Zoosphaerium bilobum
- Zoosphaerium denticulatum
- Zoosphaerium endemicum
- Zoosphaerium fisheri
- Zoosphaerium haackeri
- Zoosphaerium isalo
- Zoosphaerium mitoho
- Zoosphaerium muscorum
- Zoosphaerium pseudoblandum
- Zoosphaerium pseudoplatylabum
- Zoosphaerium smaragdinum
- Zoosphaerium subreflexum
- Zoosphaerium tsingy
- Zoosphaerium viridissimum

==== Spirobolida ====
===== Pachybolidae =====
- Aphistogoniulus cowani
- Aphistogoniulus diabolicus
- Aphistogoniulus rubrodorsalis
- Colossobolus giganteus
- Colossobolus oblongopedus
- Granitobolus andohahelensis
- Madabolus maximus
- Ostinobolus rufus
- Pseudocentrobolus aureus
- Pseudocentrobolus vohibasiensis
- Riotintobolus anomalus
- Spiromimus laticoxalis
- Spiromimus simplex
- Spiromimus triaureus
- Spiromimus univirgatus
- Zehntnerobolus rubripes

===== Spirobolellidae =====
- Hylekobolus albicollaris
- Hylekobolus analavelona
- Hylekobolus brachiosauroides
- Hylekobolus goodmani
- Hylekobolus marojejy
- Hylekobolus montanus
- Hylekobolus rufus

=== Entognatha ===
==== Collembola ====
===== Neanuridae =====
- Blasconura batai

===== Paronellidae =====
- Lepidonella lecongkieti

=== Insecta ===
==== Coleoptera ====
===== Anobiidae =====
- Xyletinus tremulicola

===== Anthribidae =====
- Homoeodera compositarum

===== Bostrichidae =====
- Stephanopachys brunneus

===== Carabidae =====
- Carabus intricatus

===== Cerambycidae =====
- Arhopalus pinetorum
- Blabinotus spinicollis
- Calchaenesthes sexmaculata
- Chlorophorus favieri
- Chlorophorus yachovi
- Clytus kabateki
- Clytus taurusiensis
- Molorchus juglandis
- Purpuricenus nicocles
- Ropalopus insubricus
- Ropalopus siculus
- Stenopterus atricornis
- Stenopterus creticus
- Stictoleptura palmi
- Stictoleptura trisignata
- Xylosteus bartoni

===== Cetoniidae =====
- Osmoderma barnabita
- Osmoderma eremita
- Trichius orientalis

===== Cucujidae =====
- Cucujus cinnaberinus

===== Elateridae =====
- Ampedus cardinalis
- Ampedus carinthiacus
- Ampedus coenobita
- Ampedus melonii
- Ampedus pulcher
- Brachygonus meraculus
- Crepidophorus mutilatus
- Reitterelater bouyoni

===== Eucnemidae =====
- Hylis simonae
- Microrhagus pyrenaeus
- Xylophilus testaceus

===== Geotrupidae =====
- Ceratophyus hoffmannseggi
- Lethrus fallax
- Thorectes albarracinus
- Thorectes lusitanicus
- Thorectes marginatus

===== Hydraenidae =====
- Cobalius freyi

===== Leiodidae =====
- Agathidium pulchellum

===== Lucanidae =====
- Ceruchus chrysomelinus
- Colophon izardi

===== Mycetophagidae =====
- Esarcus abeillei
- Esarcus leprieuri
- Pseudotriphyllus suturalis

===== Oedemeridae =====
- Nacerdes hesperica
- Sparedrus lencinae

===== Scarabaeidae =====
- Alocoderus carinifrons
- Ammoecius lusitanicus
- Anomius crovettii
- Anomius peyerimhoffi
- Anonychonitis freyi
- Ateuchetus cicatricosus
- Ateuchus halffteri
- Bdelyropsis newtoni
- Cryptocanthon foveatus
- Cryptocanthon genieri
- Cryptocanthon lobatus
- Euorodalus boiteli
- Genieridium medinae
- Gymnopleurus sturmi
- Gyronotus dispar
- Gyronotus mulanjensis
- Heptaulacus brancoi
- Holocephalus sculptus
- Macroderes endroedyi
- Macroderes undulatus
- Mimonthophagus limbibasis
- Ontherus grandis
- Ontherus irinus
- Onthophagus hippopotamus
- Onthophagus merdarius
- Onthophagus villanuevai
- Oxysternon pteroderum
- Pedaria cambeforti
- Phanaeus achilles
- Scarabaeus bornemizzai
- Scybalocanthon darlingtoni

===== Staphylinidae =====
- Atheta dryochares

===== Tenebrionidae =====
- Alphitophagus obtusangulus
- Gerandryus aetnensis
- Gonodera metallica
- Hymenorus baudii
- Mycetochara straussii
- Mycetochara thoracica
- Pelleas crotchii

===== Trogossitidae =====
- Seidlitzella procera

===== Zopheridae =====
- Diodesma denticincta
- Tarphius gibbulus

==== Grylloblattodea ====
===== Grylloblattidae =====
- Galloisiana odaesanensis

==== Hemiptera ====
===== Cicadellidae =====
- Eupteryx azorica

===== Cicadidae =====
- Magicicada cassini
- Magicicada septendecim
- Magicicada septendecula

===== Cixiidae =====
- Cixius azoricus
- Cixius insularis

===== Delphacidae =====
- Javesella azorica

==== Hymenoptera ====
===== Apidae =====
- Bombus digressus
- Bombus diligens
- Bombus mendax
- Bombus mucidus
- Epeolus cruciger
- Eucera gracilipes
- Nomada argentata
- Nomada armata
- Nomada baccata
- Nomada cretensis
- Nomada errans

===== Colletidae =====
- Colletes creticus
- Colletes cyprius
- Colletes halophilus
- Hylaeus crassanus
- Hylaeus friesei

===== Formicidae =====
- Formica aquilonia
- Formica lugubris
- Formica polyctena
- Formica pratensis
- Formica rufa
- Formica uralensis

===== Halictidae =====
- Lasioglossum minutulum
- Lasioglossum sabulosum
- Lasioglossum setulosum

===== Sphecidae =====
- Tachysphex pechumani

==== Lepidoptera ====
===== Argyresthiidae =====
- Argyresthia atlanticella

===== Crambidae =====
- Udea azorensis

===== Hesperiidae =====
- Panoquina errans

===== Lycaenidae =====
- Baliochila lequeuxi
- Chrysoritis oreas
- Iolaus aphnaeoides
- Lepidochrysops bacchus
- Lycaena dispar
- Phengaris arion
- Phengaris arionides
- Phengaris nausithous
- Phengaris teleius
- Plebejus trappi
- Poecilmitis aureus
- Polyommatus atlanticus
- Polyommatus guezelmavi
- Polyommatus nephohiptamenos
- Polyommatus nivescens
- Pseudophilotes panoptes
- Thestor brachycerus
- Turanana taygetica

===== Noctuidae =====
- Noctua carvalhoi
- Phlogophora cabrali

===== Nymphalidae =====
- Anetia briarea
- Anetia cubana
- Anetia jaegeri
- Anetia pantheratus
- Coenonympha oedippus
- Coenonympha vaucheri
- Danaus cleophile
- Erebia claudina
- Erebia epistygne
- Erebia flavofasciata
- Euploea blossomae
- Euploea gamelia
- Euploea martinii
- Euploea swainson
- Euploea tobleri
- Hipparchia fagi
- Hipparchia leighebi
- Idea iasonia
- Idea malabarica
- Maniola chia
- Neptis larseni
- Parantica albata
- Parantica nilgiriensis
- Parantica pseudomelaneus
- Parantica taprobana
- Parantica tityoides
- Protoploea apatela

===== Papilionidae =====
- Archon apollinus
- Baronia brevicornis
- Graphium mendana
- Heraclides himeros
- Luehdorfia japonica
- Ornithoptera croesus
- Ornithoptera meridionalis
- Ornithoptera paradisea
- Ornithoptera rothschildi
- Papilio benguetanus
- Papilio grosesmithi
- Papilio manlius
- Papilio maraho
- Papilio sjoestedti
- Parides burchellanus
- Teinopalpus imperialis
- Trogonoptera trojana
- Troides riedeli

===== Pieridae =====
- Colias phicomone

===== Pyralidae =====
- Helenoscoparia nigritalis

==== Odonata ====
===== Aeshnidae =====
- Allopetalia reticulosa
- Anax bangweuluensis
- Antipodophlebia asthenes
- Austroaeschna speciosa
- Austrophlebia subcostalis
- Gynacantha penelope
- Oligoaeschna platyura
- Oligoaeschna poeciloptera
- Planaeschna intersedens
- Telephlebia tillyardi
- Telephlebia tryoni

===== Argiolestidae =====
- Archiargiolestes parvulus
- Archiargiolestes pusillissimus
- Austroargiolestes alpinus
- Griseargiolestes metallicus

===== Austropetaliidae =====
- Austropetalia tonyana

===== Calopterygidae =====
- Atrocalopteryx atrocyana
- Atrocalopteryx coomani
- Sapho infumosa
- Vestalis anacolosa
- Vestalis luctuosa

===== Chlorocyphidae =====
- Chlorocypha helenae
- Indocypha vittata
- Libellago stictica
- Platycypha bamptoni
- Platycypha pinheyi
- Rhinocypha xanthe
- Stenocypha jacksoni
- Stenocypha molindica

===== Chlorogomphidae =====
- Chlorogomphus auratus

===== Coenagrionidae =====
- Agriocnemis bumhilli
- Agriocnemis dobsoni
- Andinagrion garrisoni
- Archibasis rebeccae
- Argia rosseri
- Azuragrion granti
- Coenagrion mercuriale
- Coenagrion syriacum
- Ischnura abyssinica
- Ischnura aralensis
- Ischnura intermedia
- Megalagrion nigrohamatum
- Megalagrion paludicola
- Mortonagrion arthuri
- Mortonagrion hirosei
- Nehalennia pallidula
- Nehalennia speciosa
- Protallagma hoffmanni
- Protoneura macintyrei
- Pseudagrion angolense
- Pseudagrion inopinatum

===== Cordulegastridae =====
- Cordulegaster bidentata
- Cordulegaster heros
- Cordulegaster trinacriae
- Neallogaster ornata

===== Corduliidae =====
- Hemicordulia koomina
- Hemicordulia mindana
- Procordulia karnyi
- Somatochlora ozarkensis

===== Epiophlebiidae =====
- Epiophlebia laidlawi

===== Gomphidae =====
- Acrogomphus malayanus
- Anormogomphus kiritshenkoi
- Asiagomphus amamiensis
- Asiagomphus personatus
- Austrogomphus divaricatus
- Ceratogomphus triceraticus
- Gomphus graslinii
- Heliogomphus kelantanensis
- Heliogomphus promelas
- Heliogomphus walli
- Hemigomphus theischingeri
- Ictinogomphus acutus
- Ictinogomphus dobsoni
- Megalogomphus hannyngtoni
- Merogomphus martini
- Neurogomphus pallidus
- Onychogomphus costae
- Onychogomphus treadawayi
- Ophiogomphus acuminatus
- Ophiogomphus australis
- Ophiogomphus edmundo
- Paragomphus cataractae
- Paragomphus crenigomphoides
- Paragomphus henryi
- Paragomphus sinaiticus
- Phanogomphus hodgesi
- Phanogomphus westfalli
- Progomphus kimminsi
- Stylurus nagoyanus
- Stylurus oculatus
- Zephyrogomphus longipositor

===== Heteragrionidae =====
- Heteragrion eboratum

===== Isostictidae =====
- Eurysticta coolawanyah

===== Lestidae =====
- Indolestes bellax
- Indolestes indicus

===== Lestoideidae =====
- Diphlebia hybridoides
- Lestoidea brevicauda

===== Libellulidae =====
- Indothemis carnatica
- Libellula mariae
- Libellula pontica
- Micromacromia flava
- Orthetrum balteatum
- Orthetrum boumiera
- Trithemis aequalis
- Trithemis brydeni
- Trithemis nigra
- Urothemis luciana

===== Macromiidae =====
- Macromia callisto
- Phyllomacromia funicularioides
- Phyllomacromia lamottei

===== Megapodagrionidae =====
- Teinopodagrion vallenatum

===== Not Assigned =====
- Austrocordulia territoria
- Austrophya mystica
- Cordulephya montana
- Idionyx optata
- Oxygastra curtisii
- Pseudocordulia circularis
- Pseudocordulia elliptica

===== Petaluridae =====
- Petalura litorea

===== Philogeniidae =====
- Philogenia helena

===== Philosinidae =====
- Rhinagrion elopurae

===== Platycnemididae =====
- Allocnemis abbotti
- Allocnemis interrupta
- Elattoneura atkinsoni
- Idiocnemis adelbertensis
- Melanoneura bilineata
- Mesocnemis dupuyi
- Nososticta irene
- Nososticta koongarra
- Phylloneura westermanni
- Proplatycnemis agrioides
- Risiocnemis serrata

===== Platystictidae =====
- Drepanosticta brownelli
- Drepanosticta fontinalis
- Drepanosticta krios

===== Polythoridae =====
- Stenocora percornuta

===== Synlestidae =====
- Chlorolestes elegans
- Ecchlorolestes nylephtha
- Ecchlorolestes peringueyi

===== Synthemistidae =====
- Tonyosynthemis claviculata
- Tonyosynthemis ofarrelli

==== Orthoptera ====
===== Acrididae =====
- Amblyphymus adspersus
- Arcyptera kheili
- Arminda canariensis
- Chorthippus cialancensis
- Chorthippus corsicus
- Chorthippus crassiceps
- Chorthippus parnon
- Chorthippus pulloides
- Chorthippus reissingeri
- Chorthippus sampeyrensis
- Cophopodisma pyrenaea
- Dociostaurus hispanicus
- Epipodisma pedemontana
- Galvagniella albanica
- Odontopodisma fallax
- Odontopodisma rubripes
- Paracaloptenus cristatus
- Peripodisma llofizii
- Podisma amedegnatoae
- Podisma cantabricae
- Pseudopodisma nagyi
- Rammeihippus dinaricus
- Rhachitopis sanguinipes
- Sphingonotus candidus
- Sphingonotus gypsicola
- Sphingonotus lusitanicus
- Stenobothrus cotticus
- Xerohippus solerii

===== Gryllidae =====
- Gryllomorpha canariensis
- Hymenoptila lanzarotensis
- Ovaliptila krueperi
- Ovaliptila wettsteini
- Petaloptila baenai
- Petaloptila carabajali

===== Pamphagidae =====
- Acinipe comptei
- Acinipe eulaliae
- Acinipe galvagnii
- Acinipe mabillei
- Eumigus monticola
- Eumigus punctatus
- Eumigus rubioi
- Glyphotmethis heldreichi
- Ocnerodes fallaciosus
- Ocnerodes prosternalis
- Ocnerodes soleri
- Pamphagus ortolaniae

===== Pneumoridae =====
- Pneumora inanis

===== Rhaphidophoridae =====
- Dolichopoda annae
- Dolichopoda insignis
- Dolichopoda kiriakii
- Dolichopoda paraskevi
- Dolichopoda steriotisi
- Troglophilus zoiai

===== Tetrigidae =====
- Charagotettix sogai
- Cryptotettix fanovana
- Holocerus lucifer
- Isandrus gibbosus
- Notocerus formidabilis
- Ocytettix latihumerus
- Oxytettix cataphractus
- Oxytettix hastatus
- Oxytettix macrocerus
- Procytettix robinsoni
- Silanotettix baroides
- Silanotettix notangulus
- Thymochares bolivari
- Thymochares crassipes
- Thymochares exiguus
- Thymochares frontanguolus
- Thymochares galeatus
- Thymochares modestus
- Thymochares sambavana

===== Tettigoniidae =====
- Albarracinia zapaterii
- Anonconotus baracunensis
- Anonconotus pusillus
- Ariagona margaritae
- Barbitistes kaltenbachi
- Barbitistes vicetinus
- Bicolorana kraussi
- Broughtonia domogledi
- Callicrania faberi
- Callicrania plaxicauda
- Callicrania vicentae
- Calliphona koenigi
- Canariola emarginata
- Canariola nubigena
- Canariola willemsei
- Coracinotus politus
- Corsteropleurus chopardi
- Ctenodecticus granatensis
- Ctenodecticus masferreri
- Ctenodecticus ramburi
- Ctenodecticus thymi
- Ephippiger carlottae
- Eupholidoptera cephalonica
- Eupholidoptera danconai
- Eupholidoptera garganica
- Eupholidoptera uvarovi
- Exodrymadusa inornata
- Isophya brunneri
- Isophya fatrensis
- Isophya longicaudata
- Isophya pienensis
- Isophya posthumoidalis
- Isophya taurica
- Leptophyes intermedia
- Leptophyes lisae
- Lluciapomaresius anapaulae
- Metrioptera hoermanni
- Neocallicrania barrosi
- Pachytrachis tumidus
- Platystolus surcularius
- Poecilimon heinrichi
- Poecilimon heroicus
- Poecilimon jablanicensis
- Poecilimon klausgerhardi
- Poecilimon pliginskii
- Poecilimon tauricus
- Poecilimon vodnensis
- Psorodonotus fieberi
- Psorodonotus illyricus
- Psorodonotus macedonicus
- Pycnogaster graellsii
- Pycnogaster sanchezgomezi
- Pycnogaster valentini
- Rhacocleis baccettii
- Rhacocleis corsicana
- Rhacocleis silvestrii
- Rhacocleis thyrrhenica
- Rhacocleis werneri
- Roeseliana brunneri
- Saga campbelli
- Uromenus annae

==== Phasmatodea ====
===== Diapheromeridae =====
- Rhamphosipyloidea queenslandica
- Sipyloidea brevicerci
- Sipyloidea garradungensis
- Sipyloidea rentzi
- Spinosipyloidea doddi

===== Phasmatidae =====
- Cigarrophasma tessellatum
- Ctenomorpha gargantua
- Malandania pulchra
- Parapodacanthus hasenpuschorum

===== Phylliidae =====
- Phyllium monteithi

==== Trichoptera ====
===== Limnephilidae =====
- Limnephilus atlanticus

=== Malacostraca ===
==== Decapoda ====
===== Atyidae =====
- Atyoida bisulcata
- Caridina fasciata
- Caridina formosae
- Caridina mauritii
- Caridina meridonalis
- Caridina richtersi
- Caridina serrata
- Caridina spathulirostris
- Dugastella valentina
- Gallocaris inermis
- Lancaris singhalensis
- Pycneus morsitans
- Troglocaris hercegovinensis
- Troglocaris planinensis
- Troglocaris pretneri

===== Cambaridae =====
- Cambarellus chapalanus
- Cambarus bouchardi
- Cambarus coosawattae
- Cambarus lenati
- Cambarus nerterius
- Cambarus setosus
- Cambarus speciosus
- Cambarus truncatus
- Cambarus tuckasegee
- Cambarus williami
- Fallicambarus danielae
- Fallicambarus gilpini
- Fallicambarus gordoni
- Fallicambarus harpi
- Fallicambarus oryktes
- Faxonella creaseri
- Orconectes burri
- Orconectes marchandi
- Orconectes margorectus
- Procambarus cuetzalanae
- Procambarus lagniappe
- Procambarus pallidus
- Procambarus pictus
- Procambarus vazquezae
- Procambarus zapoapensis
- Troglocambarus maclanei

===== Gecarcinucidae =====
- Austrothelphusa wasselli
- Ceylonthelphusa kandambyi
- Ceylonthelphusa venusta
- Liotelphusa gagei
- Liotelphusa laevis
- Maydelliathelphusa edentula
- Parathelphusa sarasinorum

===== Palaemonidae =====
- Macrobrachium occidentale
- Troglocubanus eigenmanni

===== Palinuridae =====
- Palinurus charlestoni

===== Parastacidae =====
- Engaeus australis
- Engaeus orramakunna
- Engaeus victoriensis
- Euastacus wiowuru
- Gramastacus insolitus
- Ombrastacoides asperrimanus
- Ombrastacoides dissitus
- Parastacus brasiliensis

===== Potamidae =====
- Geothelphusa miyazakii
- Geothelphusa tenuimanus
- Johora tiomanensis
- Pilosamon guinotae
- Potamon fluviatile
- Potamon ibericum
- Potamon potamios
- Potamon rhodium
- Potamon setiger

===== Potamonautidae =====
- Deckenia imitatrix
- Deckenia mitis

===== Pseudothelphusidae =====
- Neostrengeria perijaensis

== Chordata ==
=== Actinopterygii ===
==== Acipenseriformes ====
===== Acipenseridae =====
- Acipenser medirostris
- Acipenser oxyrinchus
- Acipenser oxyrinchus oxyrinchus

==== Atheriniformes ====
===== Atherinidae =====
- Cauque mauleanum
- Craterocephalus centralis
- Craterocephalus helenae
- Craterocephalus lentiginosus
- Menidia conchorum

===== Atherinopsidae =====
- Basilichthys australis

===== Bedotiidae =====
- Bedotia madagascariensis

===== Melanotaeniidae =====
- Melanotaenia gracilis
- Melanotaenia pygmaea

==== Beloniformes ====
===== Hemiramphidae =====
- Dermogenys megarramphus

==== Characiformes ====
===== Curimatidae =====
- Steindachnerina corumbae

==== Cypriniformes ====
===== Balitoridae =====
- Nemacheilus petrubanarescui

===== Catostomidae =====
- Catostomus snyderi
- Cycleptus elongatus
- Moxostoma hamiltoni

===== Cobitidae =====
- Cobitis takatsuensis
- Sabanejewia romanica
- Sabanejewia vallachica
- Syncrossus beauforti

===== Cyprinidae =====
- Alburnus sp. nov. 'Volvi'
- Barbus brevipinnis
- Barbus lufukiensis
- Barbus macrolepis
- Barbus meridionalis
- Barbus nasus
- Barbus sp. nov. 'Waterberg'
- Barbus sperchiensis
- Chondrostoma vardarense
- Cyprinella callitaenia
- Cyprinella monacha
- Dionda catostomops
- Esomus longimanus
- Gila intermedia
- Labeobarbus kimberleyensis
- Macrhybopsis meeki
- Notropis perpallidus
- Onychostoma gerlachi
- Oregonichthys kalawatseti
- Pelasgus marathonicus
- Pelasgus thesproticus
- Phoxinellus zeregi
- Phoxinellus zeregi meandri
- Phoxinus tennesseensis
- Pseudobarbus tenuis
- Rutilus rubilio
- Sanagia velifera
- Scardinius acarnanicus
- Scardinius dergle
- Squalius illyricus
- Squalius pyrenaicus
- Squalius sp. nov. 'Aoos'
- Squalius zrmanjae
- Varicorhinus nelspruitensis

==== Cyprinodontiformes ====
===== Cyprinodontidae =====
- Orestias laucaensis

===== Nothobranchiidae =====
- Aphyosemion alpha

===== Poeciliidae =====
- Gambusia senilis
- Poeciliopsis occidentalis

===== Profundulidae =====
- Profundulus candalarius

==== Esociformes ====
===== Umbridae =====
- Novumbra hubbsi

==== Osteoglossiformes ====
===== Notopteridae =====
- Chitala blanci

===== Osteoglossidae =====
- Scleropages leichhardti

==== Perciformes ====
===== Centrarchidae =====
- Micropterus notius

===== Cichlidae =====
- Altolamprologus calvus
- Eretmodus cyanostictus
- Haplochromis labiatus
- Haplochromis obliquidens
- Haplochromis oregosoma
- Haplochromis serranus
- Herichthys steindachneri
- Lepidiolamprologus attenuatus
- Oreochromis mossambicus
- Pundamilia nyerere

===== Elassomatidae =====
- Elassoma boehlkei

===== Eleotridae =====
- Butis butis
- Eleotris aquadulcis
- Eleotris melanosoma
- Eleotris pellegrini
- Hypseleotris ejuncida
- Hypseleotris kimberleyensis
- Hypseleotris regalis
- Kimberleyeleotris hutchinsi
- Kimberleyeleotris notata

===== Gobiidae =====
- Favonigobius melanobranchus
- Favonigobius reichei
- Knipowitschia punctatissima
- Oligolepis keiensis
- Priolepis robinsi
- Psammogobius biocellatus
- Redigobius bikolanus
- Sicyopterus stimpsoni
- Taenioides jacksoni

===== Labridae =====
- Choerodon schoenleinii

===== Osphronemidae =====
- Pseudosphromenus dayi

===== Percidae =====
- Etheostoma acuticeps
- Etheostoma cragini
- Etheostoma kanawhae
- Etheostoma luteovinctum
- Etheostoma maculatum
- Etheostoma osburni
- Etheostoma rubrum
- Percina macrocephala
- Percina nasuta
- Percina uranidea

===== Serranidae =====
- Cephalopholis hemistiktos
- Dermatolepis inermis
- Epinephelides armatus
- Epinephelus aeneus
- Epinephelus andersoni
- Epinephelus bleekeri
- Epinephelus coioides
- Epinephelus daemelii
- Epinephelus diacanthus
- Epinephelus fuscoguttatus
- Epinephelus malabaricus
- Epinephelus morio
- Epinephelus polylepis
- Epinephelus polyphekadion
- Epinephelus quernus
- Epinephelus socialis
- Mycteroperca bonaci
- Mycteroperca prionura
- Mycteroperca venenosa
- Plectropomus leopardus
- Plectropomus oligacanthus
- Plectropomus pessuliferus
- Serranus dewegeri

===== Terapontidae =====
- Hephaestus epirrhinos
- Leiopotherapon aheneus
- Syncomistes kimberleyensis
- Syncomistes rastellus

==== Salmoniformes ====
===== Galaxiidae =====
- Galaxiella munda
- Galaxiella nigrostriata

===== Lepidogalaxiidae =====
- Lepidogalaxias salamandroides

===== Retropinnidae =====
- Prototroctes maraena

===== Salmonidae =====
- Oncorhynchus nerka (COLUMBIA RIVER: Okanogan R/Osoyoos Lk)
- Oncorhynchus nerka (COLUMBIA RIVER: Wenatchee)
- Salmo cettii
- Salvelinus colii

==== Siluriformes ====
===== Clariidae =====
- Dinotopterus cunningtoni

===== Ictaluridae =====
- Noturus munitus
- Noturus placidus

===== Mochokidae =====
- Synodontis victoriae

===== Sisoridae =====
- Glyptothorax interspinalum

===== Trichomycteridae =====
- Trichomycterus laucaensis
- Trichomycterus rivulatus

==== Synbranchiformes ====
===== Chaudhuriidae =====
- Garo khajuriai

===== Synbranchidae =====
- Monopterus indicus

==== Syngnathiformes ====
===== Syngnathidae =====
- Phycodurus eques
- Phyllopteryx taeniolatus

=== Amphibia ===
==== Anura ====
===== Alytidae =====
- Alytes cisternasii
- Alytes maurus
- Discoglossus jeanneae
- Discoglossus montalentii

===== Amphignathodontidae =====
- Gastrotheca andaquiensis
- Gastrotheca aureomaculata

===== Aromobatidae =====
- Allobates mcdiarmidi
- Mannophryne herminae
- Mannophryne venezuelensis

===== Arthroleptidae =====
- Arthroleptis pyrrhoscelis
- Arthroleptis reichei
- Astylosternus montanus
- Cardioglossa nigromaculata
- Leptodactylodon ovatus
- Leptopelis kivuensis
- Leptopelis macrotis
- Leptopelis occidentalis
- Leptopelis yaldeni
- Leptopelis zebra

===== Brachycephalidae =====
- Ischnocnema epipeda
- Ischnocnema manezinho
- Ischnocnema oea

===== Bufonidae =====
- Amietophrynus togoensis
- Anaxyrus boreas
- Anaxyrus mexicanus
- Ansonia albomaculata
- Ansonia hanitschi
- Ansonia longidigita
- Ansonia minuta
- Ansonia spinulifer
- Bufo cryptotympanicus
- Bufo pageoti
- Bufo parietalis
- Bufo tuberculatus
- Bufo verrucosissimus
- Incilius campbelli
- Melanophryniscus admirabilis
- Melanophryniscus cupreuscapularis
- Melanophryniscus moreirae
- Melanophryniscus sanmartini
- Mertensophryne lonnbergi
- Osornophryne bufoniformis
- Pedostibes rugosus
- Pelophryne signata
- Pseudepidalea brongersmai
- Rhaebo blombergi
- Rhaebo hypomelas
- Rhinella achalensis
- Rhinella festae
- Rhinella sternosignata

===== Centrolenidae =====
- Centrolene antioquiense
- Cochranella megistra
- Cochranella nola
- Cochranella ocellata
- Cochranella spiculata
- Hyalinobatrachium aureoguttatum
- Nymphargus ignotus

===== Ceratobatrachidae =====
- Platymantis luzonensis
- Platymantis mimulus
- Platymantis vitiensis

===== Ceratophryidae =====
- Atelognathus jeinimenensis
- Ceratophrys ornata
- Lepidobatrachus asper
- Telmatobius bolivianus
- Telmatobius jelskii
- Telmatobius simonsi

===== Craugastoridae =====
- Craugastor berkenbuschii
- Craugastor chac
- Craugastor cyanochthebius
- Craugastor laticeps
- Craugastor podiciferus
- Craugastor rostralis
- Craugastor yucatanensis

===== Cryptobatrachidae =====
- Stefania satelles

===== Cycloramphidae =====
- Alsodes nodosus
- Crossodactylodes bokermanni
- Crossodactylodes izecksohni
- Cycloramphus brasiliensis
- Cycloramphus semipalmatus
- Eupsophus roseus
- Eupsophus vertebralis
- Proceratophrys bigibbosa
- Rupirana cardosoi
- Thoropa saxatilis

===== Dendrobatidae =====
- Ameerega bassleri
- Colostethus agilis
- Colostethus fraterdanieli
- Epipedobates anthonyi
- Epipedobates machalilla
- Hyloxalus fascianigrus
- Hyloxalus infraguttatus
- Hyloxalus lehmanni
- Hyloxalus shuar
- Oophaga sylvatica
- Phyllobates aurotaenia
- Phyllobates bicolor
- Silverstoneia nubicola

===== Dicroglossidae =====
- Limnonectes asperatus
- Limnonectes blythii
- Limnonectes dammermani
- Limnonectes ibanorum
- Limnonectes ingeri
- Limnonectes macrocephalus
- Limnonectes magnus
- Limnonectes malesianus
- Limnonectes paramacrodon
- Limnonectes rhacoda
- Limnonectes tweediei
- Nanorana annandalii
- Nanorana arnoldi
- Nanorana ercepeae
- Nanorana pleskei
- Nanorana quadranus
- Occidozyga baluensis
- Quasipaa verrucospinosa

===== Eleutherodactylidae =====
- Eleutherodactylus dimidiatus
- Eleutherodactylus eileenae
- Eleutherodactylus flavescens
- Eleutherodactylus glaucoreius
- Eleutherodactylus martinicensis
- Eleutherodactylus pantoni

===== Hemiphractidae =====
- Hemiphractus bubalus
- Hemiphractus fasciatus

===== Hylidae =====
- Aplastodiscus cavicola
- Aplastodiscus eugenioi
- Aplastodiscus weygoldti
- Ecnomiohyla miotympanum
- Hyla andersonii
- Hyla euphorbiacea
- Hyloscirtus alytolylax
- Hyloscirtus bogotensis
- Hyloscirtus callipeza
- Hyloscirtus jahni
- Hyloscirtus larinopygion
- Hypsiboas alboniger
- Hypsiboas cipoensis
- Isthmohyla melacaena
- Isthmohyla picadoi
- Isthmohyla zeteki
- Litoria jungguy
- Litoria pearsoniana
- Phrynomedusa appendiculata
- Ptychohyla euthysanota
- Scinax oreites
- Scinax trapicheiroi
- Smilisca cyanosticta
- Xenohyla truncata

===== Hylodidae =====
- Crossodactylus schmidti

===== Hyperoliidae =====
- Acanthixalus sonjae
- Afrixalus nigeriensis
- Afrixalus vibekensis
- Heterixalus carbonei
- Heterixalus rutenbergi
- Hyperolius acutirostris
- Hyperolius ademetzi
- Hyperolius bopeleti
- Hyperolius chlorosteus
- Hyperolius wermuthi
- Hyperolius zonatus
- Kassina cochranae

===== Leiuperidae =====
- Pleurodema bibroni
- Pleurodema kriegi

===== Leptodactylidae =====
- Leptodactylus laticeps
- Leptodactylus turimiquensis

===== Mantellidae =====
- Boophis majori
- Boophis occidentalis
- Boophis rhodoscelis
- Boophis rufioculis
- Gephyromantis blanci
- Gephyromantis decaryi
- Gephyromantis leucocephalus
- Gephyromantis leucomaculatus
- Gephyromantis plicifer
- Gephyromantis spiniferus
- Mantella laevigata
- Mantidactylus cowanii
- Spinomantis bertini

===== Megophryidae =====
- Leptobrachium ailaonicum
- Leptolalax dringi
- Leptolalax gracilis
- Leptolalax maurus
- Megophrys kobayashii
- Oreolalax lichuanensis
- Oreolalax rugosus
- Oreolalax schmidti
- Xenophrys baluensis
- Xenophrys binchuanensis
- Xenophrys dringi
- Xenophrys longipes
- Xenophrys mangshanensis
- Xenophrys omeimontis

===== Micrixalidae =====
- Micrixalus fuscus

===== Microhylidae =====
- Cophixalus bombiens
- Cophixalus crepitans
- Cophixalus exiguus
- Dyscophus antongilii
- Elachistocleis erythrogaster
- Glyphoglossus molossus
- Kalophrynus baluensis
- Kalophrynus nubicola
- Kalophrynus subterrestris
- Kaloula kokacii
- Kaloula mediolineata
- Microhyla perparva
- Microhyla petrigena
- Oreophryne jeffersoniana
- Ramanella montana
- Ramanella obscura
- Scaphiophryne madagascariensis

===== Myobatrachidae =====
- Adelotus brevis
- Geocrinia lutea
- Pseudophryne bibronii
- Taudactylus liemi

===== Pelobatidae =====
- Pelobates cultripes

===== Pelodytidae =====
- Pelodytes caucasicus

===== Petropedetidae =====
- Petropedetes cameronensis
- Petropedetes johnstoni
- Petropedetes natator

===== Phrynobatrachidae =====
- Phrynobatrachus alleni
- Phrynobatrachus guineensis
- Phrynobatrachus liberiensis
- Phrynobatrachus phyllophilus

===== Pipidae =====
- Xenopus amieti

===== Ptychadenidae =====
- Lanzarana largeni
- Ptychadena erlangeri
- Ptychadena superciliaris

===== Pyxicephalidae =====
- Arthroleptella landdrosia
- Arthroleptella lightfooti
- Poyntonia paludicola
- Strongylopus wageri

===== Ranidae =====
- Amolops cremnobatus
- Amolops daiyunensis
- Amolops lifanensis
- Amolops viridimaculatus
- Clinotarsus curtipes
- Glandirana tientaiensis
- Hylarana banjarana
- Hylarana chitwanensis
- Hylarana luzonensis
- Hylarana macrops
- Hylarana moellendorffi
- Hylarana mortenseni
- Hylarana similis
- Hylarana temporalis
- Meristogenys kinabaluensis
- Meristogenys phaeomerus
- Meristogenys poecilus
- Meristogenys whiteheadi
- Odorrana chapaensis
- Odorrana grahami
- Odorrana lungshengensis
- Pelophylax caralitanus
- Pelophylax grafi
- Pelophylax nigromaculatus
- Rana areolata
- Rana boylii
- Rana capito
- Rana cascadae
- Rana iberica
- Rana juliani
- Rana neovolcanica
- Staurois tuberilinguis

===== Rhacophoridae =====
- Feihyla palpebralis
- Nyctixalus pictus
- Philautus beddomii
- Philautus hosii
- Philautus longicrus
- Philautus mjobergi
- Philautus rus
- Philautus sordidus
- Philautus stictomerus
- Rhacophorus baluensis
- Rhacophorus bifasciatus
- Rhacophorus calcaneus
- Rhacophorus dulitensis
- Rhacophorus everetti
- Rhacophorus gauni
- Rhacophorus gongshanensis
- Rhacophorus harrissoni
- Rhacophorus kajau
- Rhacophorus monticola
- Rhacophorus nigropunctatus
- Rhacophorus prasinatus
- Rhacophorus reinwardtii
- Rhacophorus rufipes
- Rhacophorus taipeianus
- Rhacophorus zhaojuensis
- Theloderma rhododiscus
- Theloderma stellatum

===== Scaphiopodidae =====
- Spea hammondii

===== Strabomantidae =====
- Noblella lochites
- Pristimantis alalocophus
- Pristimantis altae
- Pristimantis anolirex
- Pristimantis caryophyllaceus
- Pristimantis celator
- Pristimantis galdi
- Pristimantis illotus
- Pristimantis juanchoi
- Pristimantis jubatus
- Pristimantis kareliae
- Pristimantis luteolateralis
- Pristimantis megalops
- Pristimantis miyatai
- Pristimantis molybrignus
- Pristimantis pardalis
- Pristimantis percnopterus
- Pristimantis riveti
- Pristimantis roseus
- Pristimantis sanctaemartae
- Pristimantis sanguineus
- Pristimantis savagei
- Pristimantis silverstonei
- Pristimantis simoterus
- Pristimantis spinosus
- Pristimantis tamsitti
- Pristimantis tayrona
- Pristimantis vanadise
- Pristimantis vicarius
- Pristimantis viridis

==== Caudata ====
===== Ambystomatidae =====
- Ambystoma barbouri
- Dicamptodon ensatus

===== Amphiumidae =====
- Amphiuma pholeter

===== Cryptobranchidae =====
- Andrias japonicus
- Cryptobranchus alleganiensis

===== Hynobiidae =====
- Liua shihi
- Paradactylodon persicus

===== Plethodontidae =====
- Aneides aeneus
- Aneides ferreus
- Aneides flavipunctatus
- Aneides vagrans
- Batrachoseps robustus
- Bolitoglossa borburata
- Bolitoglossa cuchumatana
- Bolitoglossa dofleini
- Bolitoglossa hartwegi
- Bolitoglossa helmrichi
- Bolitoglossa hermosa
- Bolitoglossa lincolni
- Bolitoglossa macrinii
- Bolitoglossa platydactyla
- Bolitoglossa tatamae
- Bolitoglossa walkeri
- Chiropterotriton priscus
- Desmognathus abditus
- Desmognathus aeneus
- Eurycea tynerensis
- Nototriton picadoi
- Nototriton richardi
- Oedipina uniformis
- Plethodon caddoensis
- Plethodon elongatus
- Plethodon jordani
- Plethodon larselli
- Plethodon neomexicanus
- Plethodon nettingi
- Plethodon ouachitae
- Plethodon punctatus
- Plethodon virginia
- Pseudoeurycea cephalica
- Pseudoeurycea galeanae
- Pseudoeurycea papenfussi
- Speleomantes ambrosii
- Speleomantes imperialis
- Speleomantes italicus
- Speleomantes strinatii

===== Proteidae =====
- Necturus lewisi

===== Rhyacotritonidae =====
- Rhyacotriton cascadae
- Rhyacotriton kezeri

===== Salamandridae =====
- Calotriton asper
- Notophthalmus perstriatus
- Ommatotriton ophryticus
- Paramesotriton caudopunctatus
- Paramesotriton hongkongensis
- Pleurodeles waltl
- Salamandra infraimmaculata
- Triturus dobrogicus
- Triturus pygmaeus
- Tylototriton asperrimus
- Tylototriton shanjing
- Tylototriton taliangensis
- Tylototriton vietnamensis

=== Aves ===
==== Anseriformes ====
===== Anatidae =====
- Anas falcata
- Aythya nyroca
- Chen canagica
- Neochen jubata
- Oxyura australis
- Oxyura maccoa
- Speculanas specularis
- Tachyeres leucocephalus

===== Anhimidae =====
- Chauna chavaria

==== Apodiformes ====
===== Apodidae =====
- Collocalia francica
- Collocalia vulcanorum
- Cypseloides rothschildi
- Hydrochous gigas
- Mearnsia picina

===== Trochilidae =====
- Augastes lumachella
- Augastes scutatus
- Campylopterus ensipennis
- Campylopterus excellens
- Campylopterus villaviscensio
- Doricha eliza
- Eriocnemis cupreoventris
- Eriocnemis derbyi
- Goethalsia bella
- Haplophaedia lugens
- Heliodoxa gularis
- Mellisuga helenae
- Metallura odomae
- Oreotrochilus adela
- Phaethornis koepckeae
- Phlogophilus harterti
- Phlogophilus hemileucurus
- Ramphodon naevius
- Thalurania watertonii

==== Caprimulgiformes ====
===== Caprimulgidae =====
- Caprimulgus pulchellus
- Eleothreptus anomalus
- Nyctiphrynus rosenbergi
- Nyctiprogne vielliardi
- Siphonorhis brewsteri

===== Podargidae =====
- Batrachostomus auritus
- Batrachostomus harterti
- Batrachostomus mixtus
- Batrachostomus poliolophus
- Batrachostomus stellatus

==== Charadriiformes ====
===== Alcidae =====
- Brachyramphus perdix

===== Burhinidae =====
- Burhinus grallarius
- Esacus giganteus

===== Charadriidae =====
- Charadrius javanicus
- Charadrius melodus
- Charadrius montanus
- Charadrius pallidus
- Charadrius peronii
- Phegornis mitchellii
- Thinornis rubricollis

===== Chionidae =====
- Pluvianellus socialis

===== Glareolidae =====
- Glareola nordmanni

===== Haematopodidae =====
- Haematopus moquini

===== Laridae =====
- Larosterna inca
- Larus audouinii
- Larus heermanni
- Larus leucophthalmus
- Pagophila eburnea
- Rynchops flavirostris
- Sterna acuticauda
- Sterna balaenarum
- Sterna elegans
- Sterna virgata

===== Scolopacidae =====
- Coenocorypha aucklandica
- Gallinago imperialis
- Gallinago macrodactyla
- Gallinago media
- Gallinago stricklandii
- Limnodromus semipalmatus
- Limosa limosa
- Numenius arquata
- Scolopax celebensis
- Scolopax saturata
- Tryngites subruficollis

==== Ciconiiformes ====
===== Ardeidae =====
- Egretta rufescens
- Zonerodius heliosylus

===== Ciconiidae =====
- Ephippiorhynchus asiaticus
- Mycteria leucocephala

===== Threskiornithidae =====
- Lophotibis cristata
- Threskiornis melanocephalus

==== Columbiformes ====
===== Columbidae =====
- Caloenas nicobarica
- Columba albinucha
- Columba bollii
- Columba janthina
- Columba palumboides
- Columba pollenii
- Columba trocaz
- Drepanoptila holosericea
- Ducula finschii
- Ducula goliath
- Ducula oceanica
- Ducula poliocephala
- Ducula rosacea
- Ducula rubricera
- Ducula subflavescens
- Gallicolumba canifrons
- Gallicolumba luzonica
- Gallicolumba xanthonura
- Geophaps smithii
- Geotrygon goldmani
- Geotrygon versicolor
- Hemiphaga novaeseelandiae
- Macropygia rufipennis
- Patagioenas inornata
- Patagioenas leucocephala
- Ptilinopus coralensis
- Ptilinopus eugeniae
- Ptilinopus jambu
- Ptilinopus layardi
- Ptilinopus merrilli
- Ptilinopus monacha
- Ptilinopus subgularis
- Reinwardtoena browni
- Reinwardtoena crassirostris
- Streptopelia reichenowi
- Treron formosae
- Treron fulvicollis
- Treron oxyurus
- Treron teysmannii
- Turacoena modesta

==== Coraciiformes ====
===== Alcedinidae =====
- Actenoides concretus
- Actenoides monachus
- Alcedo hercules
- Ceyx fallax
- Cittura cyanotis
- Pelargopsis amauroptera
- Tanysiptera carolinae
- Tanysiptera riedelii
- Todiramphus albonotatus
- Todiramphus australasia
- Todiramphus enigma
- Todiramphus farquhari
- Todiramphus lazuli

===== Brachypteraciidae =====
- Atelornis crossleyi

===== Bucerotidae =====
- Aceros comatus
- Aceros corrugatus
- Aceros leucocephalus
- Anorrhinus austeni
- Anorrhinus tickelli
- Anthracoceros coronatus
- Anthracoceros malayanus
- Buceros bicornis
- Buceros hydrocorax
- Buceros rhinoceros
- Bycanistes cylindricus
- Ceratogymna elata
- Rhinoplax vigil

===== Coraciidae =====
- Coracias garrulus
- Eurystomus azureus

==== Cuculiformes ====
===== Cuculidae =====
- Cacomantis heinrichi
- Carpococcyx radiatus
- Centropus chalybeus
- Centropus unirufus
- Centropus violaceus
- Coua verreauxi
- Cuculus vagans
- Neomorphus squamiger
- Phaenicophaeus diardi
- Phaenicophaeus sumatranus

===== Musophagidae =====
- Tauraco fischeri

==== Falconiformes ====
===== Accipitridae =====
- Accipiter collaris
- Accipiter haplochrous
- Accipiter henstii
- Accipiter madagascariensis
- Accipiter nanus
- Aegypius monachus
- Aquila gurneyi
- Buteo solitarius
- Buteo ventralis
- Buteogallus gundlachii
- Circaetus fasciolatus
- Circus macrourus
- Elanus scriptus
- Gyps africanus
- Gyps rueppellii
- Harpia harpyja
- Harpyhaliaetus solitarius
- Ichthyophaga humilis
- Ichthyophaga ichthyaetus
- Leucopternis plumbeus
- Leucopternis polionotus
- Megatriorchis doriae
- Milvus milvus
- Morphnus guianensis
- Polemaetus bellicosus
- Spilornis elgini
- Spilornis klossi
- Spizaetus isidori
- Terathopius ecaudatus

===== Cathartidae =====
- Vultur gryphus

===== Falconidae =====
- Falco concolor
- Falco fasciinucha
- Falco hypoleucos
- Falco jugger
- Falco novaeseelandiae
- Falco vespertinus
- Microhierax latifrons
- Phalcoboenus australis
- Polihierax insignis

==== Galliformes ====
===== Cracidae =====
- Aburria aburri
- Chamaepetes unicolor
- Crax daubentoni
- Ortalis superciliaris
- Penelope pileata

===== Megapodiidae =====
- Megapodius bernsteinii
- Megapodius tenimberensis

===== Odontophoridae =====
- Colinus virginianus
- Cyrtonyx ocellatus
- Odontophorus columbianus
- Odontophorus hyperythrus

===== Phasianidae =====
- Anurophasis monorthonyx
- Arborophila atrogularis
- Arborophila charltonii
- Arborophila crudigularis
- Arborophila davidi
- Argusianus argus
- Bonasa sewerzowi
- Caloperdix oculeus
- Centrocercus urophasianus
- Crossoptilon crossoptilon
- Crossoptilon harmani
- Dendragapus falcipennis
- Francolinus griseostriatus
- Francolinus streptophorus
- Lophura diardi
- Lophura ignita
- Lophura swinhoii
- Meleagris ocellata
- Polyplectron germaini
- Rheinardia ocellata
- Rhizothera longirostris
- Rollulus rouloul
- Syrmaticus humiae
- Syrmaticus mikado
- Syrmaticus soemmerringii
- Tetrao mlokosiewiczi
- Tragopan satyra

==== Gruiformes ====
===== Gruidae =====
- Balearica pavonina

===== Otididae =====
- Ardeotis australis
- Eupodotis caerulescens
- Eupodotis humilis
- Neotis denhami
- Neotis nuba
- Tetrax tetrax

===== Rallidae =====
- Crex crex
- Fulica caribaea
- Fulica cornuta
- Gallirallus insignis
- Gallirallus rovianae
- Laterallus jamaicensis
- Megacrex inepta
- Nesoclopeus woodfordi
- Porzana paykullii
- Rallina canningi
- Rallina leucospila
- Rougetius rougetii

===== Turnicidae =====
- Turnix castanotus

==== Passeriformes ====
===== Acanthizidae =====
- Aphelocephala pectoralis

===== Aegithinidae =====
- Aegithina viridissima

===== Alaudidae =====
- Certhilauda brevirostris
- Chersophilus duponti
- Mirafra cheniana
- Spizocorys sclateri

===== Bombycillidae =====
- Bombycilla japonica

===== Callaeatidae =====
- Philesturnus carunculatus

===== Campephagidae =====
- Coracina analis
- Coracina bicolor
- Coracina dispar
- Coracina fortis
- Coracina graueri
- Coracina holopolia
- Coracina mcgregori
- Lalage sharpei
- Pericrocotus igneus

===== Cardinalidae =====
- Saltator cinctus
- Saltator rufiventris

===== Certhiidae =====
- Certhia tianquanensis

===== Chloropseidae =====
- Chloropsis cyanopogon
- Chloropsis venusta

===== Cisticolidae =====
- Apalis lynesi
- Cisticola haesitatus
- Prinia burnesii

===== Cnemophilidae =====
- Loboparadisea sericea

===== Colluricinclidae =====
- Pitohui incertus

===== Corvidae =====
- Aphelocoma insularis
- Corvus fuscicapillus
- Corvus palmarum
- Corvus torquatus
- Crypsirina cucullata
- Cyanocorax caeruleus
- Cyanocorax dickeyi
- Cyanolyca pulchra
- Dendrocitta bayleyi
- Platylophus galericulatus
- Platysmurus leucopterus
- Podoces biddulphi

===== Cotingidae =====
- Carpornis cucullata
- Iodopleura pipra
- Lipaugus lanioides
- Phibalura flavirostris
- Pipreola chlorolepidota
- Tijuca atra

===== Dendrocolaptidae =====
- Campylorhamphus pucherani

===== Dicaeidae =====
- Dicaeum anthonyi
- Dicaeum everetti
- Dicaeum proprium
- Dicaeum vincens
- Prionochilus thoracicus

===== Dicruridae =====
- Dicrurus aldabranus
- Dicrurus andamanensis
- Dicrurus sumatranus

===== Emberizidae =====
- Aimophila aestivalis
- Aimophila notosticta
- Aimophila sumichrasti
- Amaurospiza moesta
- Ammodramus henslowii
- Arremon franciscanus
- Atlapetes fuscoolivaceus
- Atlapetes rufigenis
- Atlapetes terborghi
- Calcarius ornatus
- Charitospiza eucosma
- Emberiza cineracea
- Emberiza koslowi
- Emberiza yessoensis
- Emberizoides duidae
- Embernagra longicauda
- Incaspiza watkinsi
- Oryzoborus maximiliani
- Passerina ciris
- Passerina rositae
- Plectrophenax hyperboreus
- Porphyrospiza caerulescens
- Sporophila hypochroma
- Sporophila melanogaster
- Sporophila ruficollis
- Xenospingus concolor

===== Estrildidae =====
- Erythrura coloria
- Estrilda thomensis
- Lonchura stygia
- Neochmia ruficauda
- Padda fuscata
- Parmoptila rubrifrons
- Poephila cincta
- Stagonopleura guttata

===== Eupetidae =====
- Eupetes macrocerus
- Psophodes nigrogularis

===== Eurylaimidae =====
- Calyptomena hosii
- Calyptomena viridis
- Eurylaimus ochromalus

===== Formicariidae =====
- Formicarius rufifrons
- Grallaria blakei
- Grallaria eludens
- Grallaricula lineifrons
- Grallaricula loricata
- Grallaricula peruviana
- Hylopezus ochroleucus
- Pittasoma rufopileatum

===== Fringillidae =====
- Carduelis monguilloti
- Carpodacus cassinii
- Fringilla teydea
- Rhynchostruthus louisae
- Rhynchostruthus percivali
- Serinus melanochrous

===== Furnariidae =====
- Anabacerthia amaurotis
- Asthenes berlepschi
- Asthenes heterura
- Asthenes urubambensis
- Cinclodes pabsti
- Clibanornis dendrocolaptoides
- Gyalophylax hellmayri
- Leptasthenura setaria
- Leptasthenura yanacensis
- Limnoctites rectirostris
- Margarornis bellulus
- Margarornis stellatus
- Simoxenops striatus
- Simoxenops ucayalae
- Spartonoica maluroides
- Synallaxis cherriei
- Xenerpestes singularis

===== Icteridae =====
- Icterus laudabilis

===== Laniidae =====
- Lanius validirostris

===== Malaconotidae =====
- Laniarius mufumbiri
- Malaconotus lagdeni
- Prionops poliolophus

===== Maluridae =====
- Amytornis dorotheae

===== Meliphagidae =====
- Lichmera notabilis
- Melidectes whitemanensis
- Myzomela kuehni
- Myzomela malaitae
- Philemon brassi

===== Menuridae =====
- Menura alberti

===== Mimidae =====
- Melanoptila glabrirostris

===== Monarchidae =====
- Hypothymis helenae
- Lamprolia victoriae
- Mayrornis schistaceus
- Monarcha barbatus
- Monarcha browni
- Monarcha godeffroyi
- Monarcha infelix
- Monarcha leucurus
- Monarcha menckei
- Myiagra atra
- Myiagra cervinicauda
- Terpsiphone atrocaudata
- Terpsiphone bedfordi
- Terpsiphone cyanescens

===== Motacillidae =====
- Anthus antarcticus
- Anthus melindae
- Anthus nilghiriensis
- Macronyx flavicollis
- Motacilla samveasnae

===== Muscicapidae =====
- Cyornis lemprieri
- Cyornis turcosus
- Enicurus ruficapillus
- Erithacus komadori
- Eumyias albicaudatus
- Eumyias sordidus
- Ficedula disposita
- Ficedula dumetoria
- Ficedula henrici
- Ficedula nigrorufa
- Ficedula rufigula
- Ficedula semitorquata
- Ficedula timorensis
- Luscinia pectardens
- Muscicapa segregata
- Philentoma velata
- Phoenicurus alaschanicus
- Rhinomyias additus
- Rhinomyias colonus
- Rhinomyias goodfellowi
- Rhinomyias umbratilis
- Saxicola gutturalis
- Sheppardia gunningi
- Trichixos pyrropygus
- Xenocopsychus ansorgei

===== Nectariniidae =====
- Aethopyga boltoni
- Aethopyga linaraborae
- Aethopyga primigenia
- Anthreptes reichenowi
- Anthreptes rhodolaemus
- Nectarinia moreaui
- Nectarinia neergardi
- Nectarinia ursulae

===== Oriolidae =====
- Oriolus hosii
- Oriolus xanthonotus
- Sphecotheres hypoleucus

===== Pachycephalidae =====
- Pachycephala jacquinoti
- Pachycephala rufogularis

===== Paradisaeidae =====
- Astrapia mayeri
- Cicinnurus respublica
- Epimachus bruijnii
- Paradigalla carunculata
- Paradisaea decora
- Paradisaea guilielmi
- Paradisaea rubra

===== Paridae =====
- Parus amabilis
- Parus holsti
- Parus semilarvatus

===== Parulidae =====
- Myiothlypis cinereicollis
- Myiothlypis conspicillatus
- Setophaga kirtlandii
- Setophaga subita
- Setophaga vitellina
- Myioborus albifrons
- Myioborus cardonai
- Vermivora chrysoptera
- Oreothlypis crissalis

===== Petroicidae =====
- Microeca hemixantha
- Petroica phoenicea
- Poecilodryas placens

===== Philepittidae =====
- Philepitta schlegeli

===== Pipridae =====
- Xenopipo flavicapilla

===== Pittidae =====
- Pitta caerulea
- Pitta dohertyi
- Pitta granatina
- Pitta megarhyncha

===== Pityriaseidae =====
- Pityriasis gymnocephala

===== Platysteiridae =====
- Batis minima
- Platysteira albifrons

===== Ploceidae =====
- Euplectes jacksoni
- Foudia sechellarum
- Ploceus hypoxanthus
- Ploceus olivaceiceps
- Ploceus spekeoides

===== Polioptilidae =====
- Polioptila lactea

===== Prunellidae =====
- Prunella fagani

===== Ptilonorhynchidae =====
- Archboldia papuensis
- Sericulus bakeri

===== Pycnonotidae =====
- Alophoixus finschii
- Andropadus montanus
- Hypsipetes nicobariensis
- Iole olivacea
- Ixos malaccensis
- Ixos rufigularis
- Phyllastrephus poliocephalus
- Pycnonotus cyaniventris
- Pycnonotus eutilotus
- Pycnonotus melanoleucos
- Pycnonotus penicillatus
- Pycnonotus squamatus
- Pycnonotus tympanistrigus

===== Rhinocryptidae =====
- Eleoscytalopus indigoticus
- Melanopareia maranonica
- Merulaxis ater
- Psilorhamphus guttatus
- Scytalopus novacapitalis

===== Rhipiduridae =====
- Rhipidura cockerelli
- Rhipidura fuscorufa
- Rhipidura matthiae
- Rhipidura opistherythra
- Rhipidura personata
- Rhipidura tenebrosa

===== Sittidae =====
- Sitta krueperi
- Sitta solangiae
- Sitta yunnanensis

===== Sturnidae =====
- Aplonis crassa
- Aplonis feadensis
- Aplonis mystacea
- Aplonis zelandica
- Basilornis galeatus
- Basilornis mirandus
- Gracula ptilogenys
- Lamprotornis cupreocauda
- Streptocitta albertinae

===== Sylviidae =====
- Acrocephalus kerearako
- Bathmocercus cerviniventris
- Bernieria cinereiceps
- Bradypterus bangwaensis
- Bradypterus grandis
- Bradypterus major
- Bradypterus palliseri
- Bradypterus timorensis
- Cettia carolinae
- Cettia haddeni
- Crossleyia xanthophrys
- Graminicola bengalensis
- Locustella pryeri
- Megalurulus llaneae
- Megalurulus whitneyi
- Orthotomus samarensis
- Phylloscopus tytleri
- Poliolais lopezi
- Sylvia undata

===== Thamnophilidae =====
- Cercomacra brasiliana
- Cercomacra carbonaria
- Drymophila genei
- Drymophila ochropyga
- Dysithamnus stictothorax
- Formicivora iheringi
- Herpsilochmus gentryi
- Herpsilochmus sellowi
- Myrmoborus melanurus
- Myrmotherula grisea
- Myrmotherula klagesi
- Myrmotherula unicolor
- Pithys castaneus
- Thamnophilus praecox

===== Thraupidae =====
- Bangsia arcaei
- Conothraupis speculigera
- Dacnis nigripes
- Dacnis viguieri
- Euphonia chalybea
- Habia gutturalis
- Hemispingus reyi
- Iridosornis porphyrocephalus
- Neothraupis fasciata
- Orchesticus abeillei
- Oreomanes fraseri
- Phaenicophilus poliocephalus
- Tangara fucosa
- Tangara johannae
- Tangara phillipsi
- Thraupis cyanoptera

===== Timaliidae =====
- Alcippe brunneicauda
- Babax koslowi
- Babax waddelli
- Crocias albonotatus
- Cutia legalleni
- Garrulax ferrarius
- Garrulax jerdoni
- Garrulax milleti
- Garrulax nuchalis
- Garrulax rufifrons
- Garrulax taewanus
- Illadopsis rufescens
- Jabouilleia danjoui
- Kenopia striata
- Kupeornis chapini
- Kupeornis rufocinctus
- Lioptilus nigricapillus
- Macronous ptilosus
- Malacocincla malaccensis
- Malacopteron affine
- Malacopteron albogulare
- Malacopteron magnum
- Malacopteron palawanense
- Neomixis flavoviridis
- Paradoxornis heudei
- Paradoxornis margaritae
- Robsonius rabori
- Spelaeornis caudatus
- Spelaeornis chocolatinus
- Sphenocichla humei
- Sphenocichla roberti
- Stachyris dennistouni
- Stachyris grammiceps
- Stachyris herberti
- Stachyris hypogrammica
- Stachyris latistriata
- Stachyris leucotis
- Stachyris maculata
- Stachyris nigricollis
- Stachyris plateni
- Stachyris pygmaea
- Stachyris striata
- Trichastoma buettikoferi
- Trichastoma rostratum
- Turdinus atrigularis
- Turdinus macrodactylus
- Turdoides rufescens

===== Troglodytidae =====
- Campylorhynchus yucatanicus
- Henicorhina leucoptera
- Hylorchilus sumichrasti
- Troglodytes sissonii

===== Turdidae =====
- Brachypteryx hyperythra
- Geomalia heinrichi
- Myadestes elisabeth
- Myophonus castaneus
- Nesocichla eremita
- Turdus haplochrous
- Turdus olivaceofuscus
- Zoothera crossleyi
- Zoothera dohertyi
- Zoothera dumasi
- Zoothera erythronota
- Zoothera everetti
- Zoothera imbricata
- Zoothera interpres
- Zoothera joiceyi
- Zoothera leucolaema
- Zoothera machiki
- Zoothera margaretae
- Zoothera mendeni
- Zoothera oberlaenderi
- Zoothera peronii
- Zoothera schistacea
- Zoothera spiloptera
- Zoothera talaseae
- Zoothera tanganjicae

===== Tyrannidae =====
- Anairetes fernandezianus
- Aphanotriccus audax
- Contopus cooperi
- Euscarthmus rufomarginatus
- Hemitriccus cinnamomeipectus
- Hemitriccus orbitatus
- Hemitriccus rufigularis
- Knipolegus franciscanus
- Myiopagis olallai
- Myiophobus lintoni
- Ochthoeca piurae
- Phyllomyias griseocapilla
- Phylloscartes difficilis
- Phylloscartes eximius
- Phylloscartes oustaleti
- Phylloscartes paulista
- Phylloscartes sylviolus
- Phylloscartes venezuelanus
- Polystictus pectoralis
- Polystictus superciliaris
- Pseudocolopteryx dinelliana
- Suiriri islerorum
- Todirostrum viridanum
- Tumbezia salvini
- Xenotriccus callizonus
- Xenotriccus mexicanus
- Xolmis salinarum

===== Vangidae =====
- Xenopirostris polleni

===== Vireonidae =====
- Vireo bellii
- Vireo gracilirostris
- Vireo osburni

===== Zosteropidae =====
- Heleia muelleri
- Megazosterops palauensis
- Rukia longirostra
- Speirops leucophoeus
- Woodfordia lacertosa
- Zosterops flavus
- Zosterops grayi
- Zosterops hypolais
- Zosterops kuehni
- Zosterops mysorensis
- Zosterops oleagineus
- Zosterops uropygialis
- Zosterops vellalavella

==== Pelecaniformes ====
===== Anhingidae =====
- Anhinga melanogaster

===== Pelecanidae =====
- Pelecanus philippensis
- Pelecanus thagus

===== Phalacrocoracidae =====
- Phalacrocorax bougainvillii
- Phalacrocorax capensis
- Phalacrocorax coronatus
- Phalacrocorax gaimardi

==== Phoenicopteriformes ====
===== Phoenicopteridae =====
- Phoeniconaias minor
- Phoenicoparrus jamesi
- Phoenicopterus chilensis

==== Piciformes ====
===== Bucconidae =====
- Bucco noanamae

===== Indicatoridae =====
- Indicator archipelagicus
- Indicator pumilio
- Indicator xanthonotus

===== Picidae =====
- Campephilus gayaquilensis
- Campethera notata
- Dendropicos stierlingi
- Dinopium rafflesii
- Dryocopus hodgei
- Dryocopus schulzi
- Meiglyptes tukki
- Melanerpes erythrocephalus
- Melanerpes herminieri
- Piculus aurulentus
- Picumnus fulvescens
- Picumnus fuscus
- Picumnus nebulosus
- Picus rabieri
- Veniliornis chocoensis

===== Ramphastidae =====
- Andigena hypoglauca
- Andigena laminirostris
- Capito squamatus
- Lybius rubrifacies
- Megalaima henricii
- Megalaima javensis
- Megalaima mystacophanos
- Megalaima rafflesii
- Pteroglossus bailloni
- Semnornis ramphastinus

==== Procellariiformes ====
===== Diomedeidae =====
- Phoebetria palpebrata
- Thalassarche bulleri
- Thalassarche cauta
- Thalassarche steadi

===== Hydrobatidae =====
- Oceanodroma tristrami

===== Procellariidae =====
- Bulweria fallax
- Calonectris edwardsii
- Procellaria cinerea
- Pseudobulweria rostrata
- Pterodroma brevipes
- Pterodroma feae
- Pterodroma inexpectata
- Pterodroma ultima
- Puffinus griseus
- Puffinus opisthomelas
- Puffinus yelkouan

==== Psittaciformes ====
===== Psittacidae =====
- Agapornis fischeri
- Agapornis lilianae
- Alipiopsitta xanthops
- Amazona dufresniana
- Amazona leucocephala
- Amazona tucumana
- Aprosmictus jonquillaceus
- Aratinga auricapillus
- Aratinga erythrogenys
- Cacatua goffiniana
- Charmosyna margarethae
- Charmosyna meeki
- Charmosyna multistriata
- Cyanoramphus auriceps
- Eos reticulata
- Loriculus catamene
- Loriculus exilis
- Loriculus pusillus
- Loriculus tener
- Lorius albidinucha
- Micropsitta geelvinkiana
- Nannopsittaca dachilleae
- Polytelis alexandrae
- Primolius maracana
- Prioniturus flavicans
- Prioniturus montanus
- Prioniturus waterstradti
- Prosopeia personata
- Psittacula caniceps
- Psittacula longicauda
- Psittacus erithacus
- Psitteuteles iris
- Psittinus cyanurus
- Pyrilia aurantiocephala
- Pyrilia pyrilia
- Pyrrhura devillei
- Pyrrhura lepida
- Pyrrhura leucotis
- Tanygnathus lucionensis
- Trichoglossus johnstoniae
- Triclaria malachitacea

==== Sphenisciformes ====
===== Spheniscidae =====
- Pygoscelis papua
- Spheniscus magellanicus

==== Strigiformes ====
===== Strigidae =====
- Bubo shelleyi
- Glaucidium castanonotum
- Megascops barbarus
- Megascops colombianus
- Megascops marshalli
- Megascops seductus
- Ninox affinis
- Ninox burhani
- Ninox ochracea
- Ninox rudolfi
- Ninox sumbaensis
- Otus balli
- Otus elegans
- Otus enganensis
- Otus fuliginosus
- Otus longicornis
- Otus mantananensis
- Otus mentawi
- Otus mindorensis
- Otus mirus
- Otus rufescens
- Otus umbra
- Strix hylophila
- Strix occidentalis

==== Struthioniformes ====
===== Apterygidae =====
- Apteryx owenii

===== Casuariidae =====
- Casuarius bennetti

===== Rheidae =====
- Rhea americana
- Rhea pennata

==== Tinamiformes ====
===== Tinamidae =====
- Crypturellus noctivagus
- Crypturellus transfasciatus
- Tinamus solitarius

==== Trogoniformes ====
===== Trogonidae =====
- Euptilotis neoxenus
- Harpactes diardii
- Harpactes duvaucelii
- Harpactes kasumba
- Harpactes orrhophaeus
- Harpactes wardi
- Harpactes whiteheadi
- Pharomachrus mocinno
- Priotelus roseigaster
- Trogon bairdii

=== Cephalaspidomorphi ===
==== Petromyzontiformes ====
===== Petromyzontidae =====
- Caspiomyzon wagneri
- Lampetra hubbsi

=== Chondrichthyes ===
==== Carcharhiniformes ====
===== Carcharhinidae =====
- Carcharhinus acronotus
- Carcharhinus albimarginatus
- Carcharhinus amblyrhynchoides
- Carcharhinus amblyrhynchos
- Carcharhinus amboinensis (Southwest Indian Ocean subpopulation)
- Carcharhinus brachyurus
- Carcharhinus brevipinna
- Carcharhinus dussumieri
- Carcharhinus falciformis
- Carcharhinus galapagensis
- Carcharhinus leucas
- Carcharhinus limbatus
- Carcharhinus macloti
- Carcharhinus melanopterus
- Carcharhinus perezi
- Carcharhinus sealei
- Carcharhinus sorrah
- Galeocerdo cuvier
- Negaprion brevirostris
- Prionace glauca
- Scoliodon laticaudus
- Triaenodon obesus

===== Hemigaleidae =====
- Paragaleus randalli

===== Leptochariidae =====
- Leptocharias smithii

===== Scyliorhinidae =====
- Apristurus albisoma
- Atelomycterus marmoratus
- Cephaloscyllium albipinnum
- Galeus atlanticus
- Haploblepharus edwardsii
- Poroderma africanum
- Scyliorhinus capensis
- Scyliorhinus stellaris

===== Sphyrnidae =====
- Eusphyra blochii
- Sphyrna corona

===== Triakidae =====
- Hypogaleus hyugaensis
- Mustelus canis
- Mustelus mento
- Triakis megalopterus

==== Chimaeriformes ====
===== Chimaeridae =====
- Chimaera monstrosa
- Hydrolagus mirabilis
- Hydrolagus ogilbyi

==== Hexanchiformes ====
===== Chlamydoselachidae =====
- Chlamydoselachus anguineus

===== Hexanchidae =====
- Heptranchias perlo
- Hexanchus griseus
- Notorynchus cepedianus (East Pacific subpopulation)

==== Lamniformes ====
===== Lamnidae =====
- Isurus oxyrinchus (Eastern North Pacific subpopulation)

===== Odontaspididae =====
- Carcharias taurus (Western Australia subpopulation)

===== Pseudocarchariidae =====
- Pseudocarcharias kamoharai

==== Orectolobiformes ====
===== Ginglymostomatidae =====
- Ginglymostoma cirratum (Western Atlantic subpopulation)

===== Hemiscylliidae =====
- Chiloscyllium arabicum
- Chiloscyllium griseum
- Chiloscyllium hasselti
- Chiloscyllium indicum
- Chiloscyllium plagiosum
- Chiloscyllium punctatum
- Hemiscyllium freycineti
- Hemiscyllium ocellatum (New Guinea subpopulation)

===== Orectolobidae =====
- Eucrossorhinus dasypogon
- Orectolobus halei
- Orectolobus maculatus
- Orectolobus ornatus

==== Pristiophoriformes ====
===== Pristiophoridae =====
- Pliotrema warreni
- Pristiophorus peroniensis

==== Rajiformes ====
===== Arhynchobatidae =====
- Bathyraja cousseauae
- Bathyraja irrasa
- Bathyraja maccaini
- Bathyraja scaphiops
- Bathyraja spinicauda
- Pavoraja nitida
- Rhinoraja macloviana
- Rhinoraja multispinis
- Rhinoraja murrayi

===== Dasyatidae =====
- Dasyatis acutirostra
- Dasyatis akajei
- Dasyatis annotata
- Dasyatis geijskesi
- Dasyatis izuensis
- Dasyatis laevigata
- Dasyatis leylandi
- Dasyatis zugei
- Himantura granulata
- Himantura walga
- Taeniura lymma

===== Gymnuridae =====
- Gymnura poecilura

===== Mobulidae =====
- Manta birostris
- Mobula eregoodootenkee
- Mobula japanica
- Mobula munkiana
- Mobula thurstoni

===== Myliobatidae =====
- Aetobatus narinari
- Myliobatis longirostris

===== Narcinidae =====
- Discopyge tschudii
- Narcine leoparda
- Narcine vermiculatus

===== Potamotrygonidae =====
- Potamotrygon magdalenae

===== Rajidae =====
- Dipturus campbelli
- Dipturus cerva
- Dipturus gudgeri
- Dipturus innominatus
- Dipturus nidarosiensis
- Dipturus oxyrinchus
- Leucoraja erinacea
- Leucoraja fullonica
- Raja binoculata
- Raja brachyura
- Raja cervigoni
- Raja clavata
- Raja microocellata
- Raja polystigma
- Rajella caudaspinosa

===== Rhinobatidae =====
- Rhinobatos hynnicephalus
- Rhinobatos lentiginosus
- Rhinobatos leucorhynchus
- Rhinobatos nudidorsalis
- Rhinobatos percellens
- Rhinobatos productus
- Rhinobatos zanzibarensis

===== Rhinopteridae =====
- Rhinoptera bonasus
- Rhinoptera marginata
- Rhinoptera steindachneri

===== Torpedinidae =====
- Torpedo adenensis

===== Urolophidae =====
- Trygonoptera imitata
- Urolophus aurantiacus
- Urolophus kapalensis

===== Urotrygonidae =====
- Urotrygon venezuelae

==== Squaliformes ====
===== Centrophoridae =====
- Centrophorus acus
- Centrophorus niaukang
- Deania quadrispinosa

===== Dalatiidae =====
- Dalatias licha
- Dalatias licha (Northeast Atlantic subpopulation)

===== Echinorhinidae =====
- Echinorhinus cookei

===== Somniosidae =====
- Centroscymnus coelolepis
- Proscymnodon plunketi
- Somniosus microcephalus

===== Squalidae =====
- Squalus chloroculus
- Squalus edmundsi
- Squalus grahami
- Squalus hemipinnis
- Squalus rancureli

==== Squatiniformes ====
===== Squatinidae =====
- Squatina californica

=== Mammalia ===
==== Afrosoricida ====
===== Chrysochloridae =====
- Amblysomus corriae
- Amblysomus septentrionalis

===== Tenrecidae =====
- Micropotamogale ruwenzorii

==== Carnivora ====
===== Canidae =====
- Atelocynus microtis
- Chrysocyon brachyurus
- Pseudalopex sechurae
- Speothos venaticus
- Urocyon littoralis

===== Eupleridae =====
- Eupleres goudotii
- Fossa fossana
- Galidictis fasciata

===== Felidae =====
- Caracal aurata
- Felis margarita
- Leopardus colocolo
- Leopardus geoffroyi
- Leopardus wiedii
- Otocolobus manul
- Panthera onca
- Panthera pardus
- Pardofelis temminckii

===== Herpestidae =====
- Bdeogale jacksoni

===== Hyaenidae =====
- Hyaena hyaena
- Parahyaena brunnea

===== Mustelidae =====
- Arctonyx collaris
- Lutra lutra
- Mustela altaica

===== Otariidae =====
- Arctocephalus philippii
- Arctocephalus townsendi

===== Viverridae =====
- Genetta bourloni
- Viverra zibetha

==== Cetartiodactyla ====
===== Bovidae =====
- Alcelaphus buselaphus major
- Antilope cervicapra
- Bison bison
- Capra cylindricornis
- Capricornis milneedwardsii
- Capricornis rubidus
- Capricornis thar
- Damaliscus lunatus topi
- Eudorcas thomsonii
- Hemitragus jemlahicus
- Kobus ellipsiprymnus defassa
- Kobus vardonii
- Litocranius walleri
- Naemorhedus goral
- Oryx beisa
- Oryx beisa beisa
- Ovis ammon
- Procapra picticaudata
- Tragelaphus eurycerus
- Tragelaphus eurycerus eurycerus
- Tragelaphus imberbis

===== Cervidae =====
- Elaphodus cephalophus
- Ozotoceros bezoarticus

===== Delphinidae =====
- Cephalorhynchus eutropia
- Orcaella heinsohni
- Sousa chinensis

===== Giraffidae =====
- Okapia johnstoni

===== Monodontidae =====
- Delphinapterus leucas
- Monodon monoceros

===== Suidae =====
- Sus celebensis

===== Tayassuidae =====
- Tayassu pecari

==== Chiroptera ====
===== Emballonuridae =====
- Taphozous australis

===== Hipposideridae =====
- Hipposideros commersoni
- Hipposideros doriae
- Hipposideros jonesi
- Hipposideros lekaguli
- Hipposideros pelingensis
- Hipposideros turpis
- Hipposideros vittatus

===== Molossidae =====
- Otomops martiensseni
- Tadarida mops

===== Natalidae =====
- Chilonatalus micropus
- Chilonatalus tumidifrons
- Natalus espiritosantensis
- Natalus major

===== Nycteridae =====
- Nycteris tragata

===== Phyllostomidae =====
- Anoura cultrata
- Choeronycteris mexicana
- Ectophylla alba
- Lonchophylla concava
- Lonchophylla dekeyseri
- Platalina genovensium
- Platyrrhinus matapalensis
- Rhinophylla alethina
- Sturnira aratathomasi
- Sturnira mordax
- Sturnira oporaphilum
- Vampyrum spectrum

===== Pteropodidae =====
- Dobsonia pannietensis
- Dyacopterus spadiceus
- Eidolon helvum
- Eonycteris robusta
- Epomophorus angolensis
- Pteropus caniceps
- Pteropus chrysoproctus
- Pteropus dasymallus
- Pteropus pelewensis
- Pteropus pumilus
- Pteropus rayneri
- Pteropus samoensis
- Pteropus vampyrus
- Rousettus madagascariensis

===== Rhinolophidae =====
- Rhinolophus deckenii
- Rhinolophus euryale
- Rhinolophus formosae
- Rhinolophus robinsoni
- Rhinolophus rufus
- Rhinolophus sedulus

===== Vespertilionidae =====
- Barbastella barbastellus
- Bauerus dubiaquercus
- Chalinolobus dwyeri
- Chalinolobus picatus
- Corynorhinus mexicanus
- Eptesicus innoxius
- Falsistrellus mackenziei
- Histiotus laephotis
- Kerivoula intermedia
- Kerivoula minuta
- Kerivoula pellucida
- Lasiurus pfeifferi
- Miniopterus schreibersii
- Murina puta
- Myotis atacamensis
- Myotis bechsteinii
- Myotis bombinus
- Myotis dasycneme
- Myotis grisescens
- Myotis macrotarsus
- Myotis pilosus
- Myotis punicus
- Myotis ridleyi
- Myotis ruber
- Nyctalus aviator
- Nyctalus lasiopterus
- Nycticeius cubanus
- Phoniscus atrox
- Pipistrellus brunneus
- Plecotus taivanus

==== Cingulata ====
===== Dasypodidae =====
- Cabassous chacoensis
- Calyptophractus retusus
- Dasypus hybridus
- Tolypeutes matacus
- Zaedyus pichiy

==== Dasyuromorphia ====
===== Dasyuridae =====
- Antechinus godmani
- Dasyurus albopunctatus
- Dasyurus geoffroii
- Dasyurus maculatus
- Dasyurus spartacus
- Dasyurus viverrinus
- Phascogale calura
- Phascogale tapoatafa
- Pseudantechinus bilarni
- Sminthopsis douglasi

==== Didelphimorphia ====
===== Didelphidae =====
- Gracilinanus dryas
- Thylamys macrurus

==== Diprotodontia ====
===== Macropodidae =====
- Dendrolagus bennettianus
- Dorcopsulus vanheurni
- Macropus bernardus
- Macropus parma
- Petrogale burbidgei
- Petrogale coenensis
- Petrogale lateralis
- Petrogale penicillata
- Petrogale sharmani
- Petrogale xanthopus

===== Phalangeridae =====
- Spilocuscus kraemeri

===== Potoroidae =====
- Bettongia gaimardi
- Bettongia lesueur

===== Pseudocheiridae =====
- Hemibelideus lemuroides
- Pseudochirops albertisii
- Pseudochirops corinnae

==== Eulipotyphla ====
===== Soricidae =====
- Blarinella quadraticauda
- Chimarrogale hantu
- Chodsigoa smithii
- Crocidura buettikoferi
- Crocidura grandiceps
- Crocidura nimbae
- Crocidura niobe
- Myosorex babaulti
- Myosorex sclateri
- Paracrocidura maxima
- Sorex alpinus
- Sylvisorex vulcanorum

===== Talpidae =====
- Mogera tokudae

==== Lagomorpha ====
===== Leporidae =====
- Lepus callotis
- Lepus insularis
- Lepus yarkandensis
- Oryctolagus cuniculus
- Sylvilagus mansuetus
- Sylvilagus obscurus

==== Macroscelidea ====
===== Macroscelididae =====
- Rhynchocyon cirnei

==== Microbiotheria ====
===== Microbiotheriidae =====
- Dromiciops gliroides

==== Paucituberculata ====
===== Caenolestidae =====
- Caenolestes caniventer
- Rhyncholestes raphanurus

==== Peramelemorphia ====
===== Peramelidae =====
- Perameles gunnii

==== Perissodactyla ====
===== Rhinocerotidae =====
- Ceratotherium simum
- Ceratotherium simum simum

==== Pholidota ====
===== Manidae =====
- Manis crassicaudata
- Manis culionensis
- Phataginus tricuspis
- Smutsia gigantea

==== Pilosa ====
===== Myrmecophagidae =====
- Myrmecophaga tridactyla

==== Primates ====
===== Aotidae =====
- Aotus azarae infulatus

===== Callitrichidae =====
- Callithrix kuhlii
- Saguinus nigricollis graellsi
- Saguinus tripartitus

===== Cebidae =====
- Cebus albifrons cuscinus
- Cebus nigritus
- Saimiri sciureus albigena
- Saimiri ustus

===== Cercopithecidae =====
- Cercocebus atys atys
- Cercopithecus mitis heymansi
- Cercopithecus pogonias elegans
- Colobus angolensis cordieri
- Lophocebus aterrimus
- Lophocebus aterrimus aterrimus
- Macaca assamensis
- Macaca assamensis assamensis
- Macaca assamensis pelops
- Macaca fascicularis philippensis
- Macaca thibetana
- Papio papio
- Presbytis femoralis
- Presbytis femoralis robinsoni
- Presbytis melalophos melalophos
- Presbytis siamensis
- Presbytis siamensis cana
- Presbytis siamensis paenulata
- Presbytis siamensis siamensis
- Procolobus rufomitratus tholloni
- Procolobus verus
- Semnopithecus hector
- Semnopithecus priam
- Semnopithecus priam priam
- Trachypithecus cristatus
- Trachypithecus cristatus cristatus
- Trachypithecus obscurus

===== Cheirogaleidae =====
- Mirza coquereli

===== Daubentoniidae =====
- Daubentonia madagascariensis

===== Galagidae =====
- Galagoides orinus

===== Lemuridae =====
- Eulemur fulvus
- Eulemur rufifrons
- Lemur catta

===== Lorisidae =====
- Loris lydekkerianus lydekkerianus
- Loris lydekkerianus malabaricus

===== Pitheciidae =====
- Callicebus nigrifrons

===== Tarsiidae =====
- Tarsius syrichta

==== Rodentia ====
===== Bathyergidae =====
- Cryptomys anselli

===== Capromyidae =====
- Mysateles prehensilis

===== Caviidae =====
- Dolichotis patagonum
- Microcavia shiptoni

===== Cricetidae =====
- Abrothrix illuteus
- Abrothrix sanborni
- Akodon siberiae
- Alticola roylei
- Arborimus longicaudus
- Arborimus pomo
- Bibimys torresi
- Chelemys megalonyx
- Eothenomys wardi
- Habromys lophurus
- Handleyomys saturatior
- Hylaeamys laticeps
- Ichthyomys hydrobates
- Isthmomys flavidus
- Mesocricetus brandti
- Mesocricetus newtoni
- Microtus cabrerae
- Microtus guatemalensis
- Microtus kikuchii
- Microtus quasiater
- Microtus sachalinensis
- Microtus schelkovnikovi
- Necromys obscurus
- Nelsonia neotomodon
- Neotoma magister
- Neotoma phenax
- Peromyscus grandis
- Peromyscus polius
- Phyllotis bonariensis
- Prometheomys schaposchnikowi
- Rhagomys rufescens
- Rheomys thomasi
- Rhipidomys modicus
- Thomasomys gracilis

===== Ctenomyidae =====
- Ctenomys argentinus
- Ctenomys dorbignyi
- Ctenomys emilianus
- Ctenomys pearsoni
- Ctenomys porteousi

===== Cuniculidae =====
- Cuniculus taczanowskii

===== Dasyproctidae =====
- Dasyprocta guamara

===== Dipodidae =====
- Allactaga euphratica
- Allactaga vinogradovi
- Pygeretmus zhitkovi
- Sicista kluchorica

===== Geomyidae =====
- Geomys arenarius

===== Gliridae =====
- Eliomys quercinus

===== Heteromyidae =====
- Dipodomys spectabilis

===== Muridae =====
- Apodemus hyrcanicus
- Apomys insignis
- Arvicanthis blicki
- Batomys granti
- Bunomys penitus
- Chrotomys gonzalesi
- Chrotomys mindorensis
- Conilurus penicillatus
- Gerbillus gleadowi
- Grammomys dryas
- Lophuromys brevicaudus
- Margaretamys elegans
- Mastacomys fuscus
- Mesembriomys gouldii
- Niviventer culturatus
- Papagomys armandvillei
- Pogonomelomys bruijnii
- Praomys delectorum
- Pseudomys shortridgei
- Rattus elaphinus
- Rattus feliceus
- Rattus jobiensis
- Rhynchomys soricoides
- Zyzomys maini

===== Octodontidae =====
- Tympanoctomys barrerae

===== Sciuridae =====
- Aeretes melanopterus
- Callosciurus nigrovittatus
- Callosciurus quinquestriatus
- Hylopetes nigripes
- Lariscus hosei
- Lariscus obscurus
- Paraxerus vexillarius
- Petaurista magnificus
- Petinomys fuscocapillus
- Ratufa affinis
- Ratufa bicolor
- Ratufa indica
- Ratufa macroura
- Rhinosciurus laticaudatus
- Sciurus richmondi
- Spermophilus madrensis
- Spermophilus musicus
- Spermophilus suslicus
- Spermophilus washingtoni
- Spermophilus xanthoprymnus
- Sundasciurus hippurus
- Sundasciurus moellendorffi
- Syntheosciurus brochus
- Trogopterus xanthipes

===== Spalacidae =====
- Spalax graecus
- Spalax uralensis

=== Reptilia ===
==== Squamata ====
===== Agamidae =====
- Uromastyx alfredschmidti

===== Anguidae =====
- Anguis cephalonnica
- Celestus rozellae

===== Boidae =====
- Epicrates angulifer
- Epicrates inornatus
- Morelia spilota imbricata
- Python molurus

===== Chamaeleonidae =====
- Bradypodion nemorale
- Bradypodion thamnobates

===== Colubridae =====
- Clonophis kirtlandii
- Conopsis amphisticha
- Elaphe quatuorlineata
- Homoroselaps dorsalis
- Lampropeltis ruthveni
- Lamprophis fuscus
- Lamprophis swazicus
- Liopeltis herminae
- Macroprotodon brevis
- Nerodia harteri
- Nerodia paucimaculata
- Oligodon ancorus
- Oligodon perkinsi
- Pantherophis gloydi
- Sonora aemula
- Stegonotus muelleri
- Stilosoma extenuatum

===== Cordylidae =====
- Cordylus lawrenci
- Platysaurus relictus
- Pseudocordylus langi
- Pseudocordylus spinosus

===== Elapidae =====
- Elapognathus minor
- Naja philippinensis
- Simoselaps calonotus

===== Gekkonidae =====
- Afroedura hawequensis
- Ailuronyx tachyscopaeus
- Cyrtodactylus redimiculus
- Euleptes europaea
- Gekko athymus
- Goggia microlepidota
- Homopholis mulleri
- Hoplodactylus kahutarae
- Hoplodactylus rakiurae
- Phelsuma ocellata
- Phyllodactylus unctus
- Ptychozoon intermedium
- Quedenfeldtia trachyblepharus
- Underwoodisaurus sphyrurus

===== Gerrhosauridae =====
- Gerrhosaurus typicus

===== Helodermatidae =====
- Heloderma suspectum

===== Iguanidae =====
- Ctenosaura alfredschmidti

===== Lacertidae =====
- Acanthodactylus bedriagai
- Acanthodactylus savignyi
- Algyroides moreoticus
- Archaeolacerta bedriagae
- Atlantolacerta andreanskyi
- Australolacerta rupicola
- Darevskia dahli
- Darevskia derjugini
- Darevskia mixta
- Darevskia praticola
- Darevskia unisexualis
- Hellenolacerta graeca
- Iberolacerta bonnali
- Iberolacerta galani
- Iberolacerta horvathi
- Lacerta schreiberi
- Podarcis pityusensis
- Psammodromus blanci
- Timon lepidus

===== Phrynosomatidae =====
- Holbrookia lacerata
- Phrynosoma mcallii
- Sceloporus ornatus
- Sceloporus woodi
- Uma notata
- Uma paraphygas
- Uma rufopunctata

===== Pygopodidae =====
- Aprasia pseudopulchella

===== Scincidae =====
- Brachymeles bicolor
- Brachymeles minimus
- Chalcides bedriagai
- Chalcides lanzai
- Chalcides montanus
- Chalcides pseudostriatus
- Coeranoscincus reticulatus
- Eumeces kishinouyei
- Oligosoma fallai
- Oligosoma infrapunctatum
- Scelotes gronovii
- Sphenomorphus beyeri
- Sphenomorphus llanosi
- Sphenomorphus luzonense
- Sphenomorphus mindanensis
- Sphenomorphus tagapayo
- Sphenomorphus victoria

===== Teiidae =====
- Aspidoscelis arizonae
- Aspidoscelis dixoni
- Aspidoscelis neotesselata
- Aspidoscelis rodecki

===== Tropiduridae =====
- Stenocercus fimbriatus

===== Varanidae =====
- Varanus nuchalis

===== Viperidae =====
- Agkistrodon bilineatus
- Daboia deserti
- Daboia mauritanica
- Montivipera raddei
- Vipera barani
- Vipera lotievi
- Vipera monticola
- Vipera transcaucasiana

==== Testudines ====
===== Chelidae =====
- Acanthochelys macrocephala
- Acanthochelys radiolata
- Acanthochelys spixii
- Chelodina colliei
- Chelodina reimanni
- Chelodina oblonga
- Mesoclemmys vanderhaegei
- Rhinemys rufipes

===== Emydidae =====
- Emydoidea blandingii
- Emys orbicularis
- Graptemys barbouri
- Graptemys ernsti
- Graptemys gibbonsi
- Graptemys nigrinoda
- Graptemys versa
- Malaclemys terrapin
- Pseudemys gorzugi
- Pseudemys rubriventris
- Terrapene carolina
- Terrapene ornata
- Trachemys scripta
- Trachemys stejnegeri

===== Geoemydidae =====
- Cyclemys dentata
- Mauremys japonica
- Melanochelys trijuga
- Pangshura smithii
- Rhinoclemmys annulata
- Rhinoclemmys areolata
- Rhinoclemmys funerea
- Rhinoclemmys nasuta
- Rhinoclemmys rubida

===== Kinosternidae =====
- Claudius angustatus
- Kinosternon acutum
- Kinosternon herrerai
- Staurotypus salvinii
- Staurotypus triporcatus

===== Testudinidae =====
- Homopus signatus
- Kinixys natalensis
- Testudo hermanni

===== Trionychidae =====
- Cyclanorbis elegans
- Cyclanorbis senegalensis
- Cycloderma frenatum

== Cnidaria ==
=== Anthozoa ===
==== Scleractinia ====
===== Acroporidae =====
- Acropora appressa
- Acropora arabensis
- Acropora austera
- Acropora carduus
- Acropora digitifera
- Acropora divaricata
- Acropora florida
- Acropora formosa
- Acropora glauca
- Acropora granulosa
- Acropora humilis
- Acropora hyacinthus
- Acropora loripes
- Acropora lutkeni
- Acropora millepora
- Acropora monticulosa
- Acropora nana
- Acropora nasuta
- Acropora pichoni
- Acropora secale
- Acropora selago
- Acropora tenuis
- Astreopora expansa
- Astreopora macrostoma
- Isopora palifera
- Montipora capitata
- Montipora confusa
- Montipora cryptus
- Montipora efflorescens
- Montipora effusa
- Montipora foliosa
- Montipora foveolata
- Montipora hirsuta
- Montipora incrassata
- Montipora niugini
- Montipora nodosa
- Montipora palawanensis
- Montipora peltiformis
- Montipora porites
- Montipora saudii
- Montipora undata
- Montipora venosa

===== Agariciidae =====
- Agaricia tenuifolia
- Leptoseris amitoriensis
- Leptoseris striata
- Pachyseris gemmae
- Pavona minuta

===== Astrocoeniidae =====
- Palauastrea ramosa

===== Dendrophylliidae =====
- Duncanopsammia axifuga
- Heteropsammia eupsammides
- Turbinaria radicalis

===== Euphylliidae =====
- Euphyllia divisa
- Euphyllia glabrescens
- Euphyllia yaeyamaensis
- Plerogyra simplex
- Plerogyra sinuosa

===== Faviidae =====
- Caulastrea tumida
- Diploastrea heliopora
- Echinopora forskaliana
- Echinopora fruticulosa
- Echinopora horrida
- Echinopora mammiformis
- Echinopora pacificus
- Echinopora taylorae
- Erythrastrea flabellata
- Favia albidus
- Favia helianthoides
- Favia lacuna
- Favia laxa
- Favia lizardensis
- Favia maritima
- Favia marshae
- Favia matthaii
- Favia maxima
- Favia rotundata
- Favia stelligera
- Favia veroni
- Favia vietnamensis
- Favites abdita
- Favites acuticollis
- Favites bestae
- Favites chinensis
- Favites complanata
- Favites flexuosa
- Favites halicora
- Favites micropentagona
- Favites paraflexuosa
- Favites russelli
- Favites stylifera
- Favites vasta
- Goniastrea columella
- Goniastrea favulus
- Goniastrea minuta
- Goniastrea palauensis
- Goniastrea peresi
- Goniastrea thecata
- Leptastrea bewickensis
- Leptastrea bottae
- Leptastrea inaequalis
- Leptoria phrygia
- Montastrea annuligera
- Montastrea colemani
- Montastrea magnistellata
- Montastrea valenciennesi
- Oulophyllia bennettae
- Oulophyllia crispa
- Platygyra acuta
- Platygyra carnosus
- Platygyra crosslandi
- Platygyra lamellina
- Platygyra ryukyuensis
- Platygyra verweyi
- Plesiastrea devantieri

===== Fungiidae =====
- Ctenactis albitentaculata
- Fungia fungites
- Lithophyllon undulatum
- Podabacia motuporensis
- Polyphyllia novaehiberniae

===== Merulinidae =====
- Hydnophora exesa
- Hydnophora microconos
- Paraclavarina triangularis

===== Mussidae =====
- Acanthastrea hillae
- Acanthastrea lordhowensis
- Acanthastrea maxima
- Acanthastrea rotundoflora
- Acanthastrea subechinata
- Australomussa rowleyensis
- Blastomussa wellsi
- Cynarina lacrymalis
- Lobophyllia pachysepta
- Micromussa amakusensis
- Micromussa minuta
- Scolymia vitiensis

===== Oculinidae =====
- Galaxea fascicularis
- Galaxea longisepta
- Galaxea paucisepta

===== Pectiniidae =====
- Echinomorpha nishihirai
- Pectinia ayleni
- Pectinia elongata
- Pectinia paeonia
- Pectinia pygmaeus
- Pectinia teres

===== Pocilloporidae =====
- Pocillopora eydouxi
- Seriatopora caliendrum
- Seriatopora stellata
- Stylophora pistillata
- Stylophora wellsi

===== Poritidae =====
- Alveopora catalai
- Alveopora spongiosa
- Alveopora viridis
- Goniopora columna
- Goniopora lobata
- Goniopora minor
- Goniopora stokesi
- Goniopora tenella
- Porites annae
- Porites branneri
- Porites cylindrica
- Porites deformis
- Porites densa
- Porites echinulata
- Porites harrisoni
- Porites lobata
- Porites murrayensis
- Porites negrosensis
- Porites somaliensis
- Porites stephensoni

===== Siderastreidae =====
- Coscinaraea crassa
- Psammocora contigua
- Psammocora digitata
- Psammocora obtusangula
- Psammocora vaughani
- Pseudosiderastrea tayami

===== Trachyphylliidae =====
- Trachyphyllia geoffroyi

==== Stolonifera ====
===== Tubiporidae =====
- Tubipora musica

=== Hydrozoa ===
==== Milleporina ====
===== Milleporidae =====
- Millepora murrayi

== Echinodermata ==
=== Echinoidea ===
==== Echinoida ====
===== Echinidae =====
- Echinus esculentus

== Mollusca ==
=== Bivalvia ===
==== Unionida ====
===== Margaritiferidae =====
- Cumberlandia monodonta

===== Unionidae =====
- Actinonaias pectorosa
- Amphinaias asperata
- Amphinaias houstonensis
- Amphinaias refulgens
- Anodontoides radiatus
- Cyclonaias tuberculata
- Ellipsaria lineolata
- Elliptio ahenea
- Elliptio angustata
- Elliptio congaraea
- Elliptio dariensis
- Elliptio downiei
- Elliptio folliculata
- Elliptio hopetonensis
- Elliptio lanceolata
- Elliptio mcmichaeli
- Elliptio producta
- Elliptio shepardiana
- Fusconaia askewi
- Fusconaia barnesiana
- Fusconaia lananensis
- Fusconaia ozarkensis
- Fusconaia subrotunda
- Fusconaia succissa
- Lampsilis bracteata
- Lampsilis cardium
- Lampsilis fullerkati
- Lampsilis haddletoni
- Lampsilis ornata
- Lampsilis ovata
- Lampsilis perovalis
- Lampsilis reeviana brevicula
- Lampsilis satura
- Lampsilis splendida
- Lampsilis straminea claibornensis
- Lampsilis straminea straminea
- Lasmigona complanata alabamensis
- Lasmigona holstonia
- Lasmigona subviridis
- Leptodea leptodon
- Leptodea ochracea
- Lexingtonia dolabelloides
- Ligumia nasuta
- Ligumia recta
- Medionidus conradicus
- Obovaria jacksoniana
- Obovaria subrotunda
- Obovaria unicolor
- Plethobasus cyphyus
- Pleurobema beadleianum
- Pleurobema cordatum
- Pleurobema riddellii
- Pleurobema rubrum
- Pseudanodonta complanata
- Ptychobranchus occidentalis
- Ptychobranchus subtentum
- Pyganodon gibbosa
- Quadrula rumphiana
- Quincuncina infucata
- Strophitus connasaugaensis
- Strophitus subvexus
- Theliderma cylindrica cylindrica
- Unio crassus

==== Venerida ====
===== Sphaeriidae =====
- Pisidium fultoni

=== Gastropoda ===
==== Architaenioglossa ====
===== Ampullariidae =====
- Afropomus balanoideus
- Lanistes ciliatus
- Lanistes elliptus

===== Pupinidae =====
- Pupina coxeni
- Pupina pfeifferi

===== Viviparidae =====
- Bellamya costulata
- Bellamya monardi
- Viviparus acerosus

==== Cycloneritimorpha ====
===== Neritidae =====
- Neritina manoeli

==== Hygrophila ====
===== Planorbidae =====
- Ancylus regularis
- Bulinus browni
- Bulinus cernicus
- Bulinus crystallinus
- Bulinus hexaploidus
- Bulinus hightoni
- Bulinus octaploidus
- Stimulator consetti

==== Littorinimorpha ====
===== Bithyniidae =====
- Gabbiella rosea

===== Hydrobiidae =====
- Bythinella carinulata
- Bythinella pupoides
- Bythinella vesontiana
- Bythiospeum elseri
- Falniowskia neglectissima
- Fluviopupa gracilis
- Fluviopupa ramsayi
- Fonscochlea zeidleri
- Hemistoma gemma
- Hydrobia accrensis
- Nanocochlea parva
- Potamopyrgus oscitans
- Trochidrobia punicea
- Victodrobia victoriensis

===== Moitessieriidae =====
- Paladilhia hungarica
- Spiralix rayi

===== Pomatiopsidae =====
- Tomichia rogersi

==== Neogastropoda ====
===== Buccinidae =====
- Ranella olearia
- Ranella parthenopaeum

===== Muricidae =====
- Latiaxis babelis

==== Sorbeoconcha ====
===== Pleuroceridae =====
- Lithasia geniculata

===== Thiaridae =====
- Bridouxia ponsonbyi
- Bridouxia praeclara
- Cleopatra grandidieri
- Lavigera coronata
- Melanatria fluminea
- Melanatria madagascarensis
- Melanoides admirabilis
- Melanoides polymorpha
- Melanoides pupiformis
- Melanoides turritispira
- Spekia coheni
- Tanganyicia rufofilosa

==== Stylommatophora ====
===== Acavidae =====
- Anoglypta launcestonensis

===== Agriolimacidae =====
- Deroceras vascoana

===== Camaenidae =====
- Amphidromus cognatus
- Amplirhagada montalivetensis
- Austrochloritis ascensa
- Austrochloritis pusilla
- Granulomelon squamulosum
- Baudinella baudinensis
- Cooperconcha centralis
- Craterodiscus pricei
- Cristilabrum spectaculum
- Cupedora broughami
- Cupedora luteofusca
- Cupedora marcidum
- Cupedora sutilosa
- Cupedora tomsetti
- Glyptorhagada janaslini
- Glyptorhagada wilkawillina umbilicata
- Granulomelon grandituberculatum
- Jacksonena delicata
- Jacksonena rudis
- Lacustrelix minor
- Lacustrelix yerelinana
- Meliobba shafferyi
- Meridolum marshalli
- Mesodontrachia desmonda
- Mesodontrachia fitzroyana
- Ordtrachia australis
- Ordtrachia septentrionalis
- Papuexul bidwilli
- Pleuroxia arcigerens
- Pleuroxia italowiana
- Posorites turneri
- Semotrachia sublevata
- Semotrachia winneckeana
- Setobaudinia victoriana
- Sphaerospira macleayi
- Sphaerospira rockhamptonensis
- Sphaerospira whartoni
- Torresitrachia funium

===== Cerastidae =====
- Pachnodus silhouettanus

===== Charopidae =====
- Allocharopa okeana
- Allocharopa tarravillensis
- Pillomena aemula
- Setomedea nudicostata

===== Chondrinidae =====
- Solatopupa psarolena
- Sterkia clementina

===== Clausiliidae =====
- Alopia bielzii clathrata
- Boettgeria crispa
- Charpentieria diodon
- Macrogastra lineolata euzieriana
- Muticaria macrostoma

===== Cochlicopidae =====
- Cryptazeca vasconica

===== Discidae =====
- Discus scutula

===== Helicidae =====
- Allognathus graellsianus
- Codringtonia acarnanica
- Cylindrus obtusus
- Faustina cingulella
- Faustina rossmaessleri
- Helix godetiana
- Hemicycla berkeleii
- Hemicycla mascaensis
- Iberus gualtieranus
- Pseudocampylaea portosanctana

===== Helicodiscidae =====
- Helicodiscus diadema
- Helicodiscus hexodon

===== Helminthoglyptidae =====
- Eremarionta morongoana
- Helminthoglypta mohaveana
- Sonorella allynsmithi
- Sonorella christenseni
- Sonorella eremita
- Sonorella grahamensis
- Sonorella macrophallus
- Sonorella metcalfi
- Sonorella todseni

===== Hygromiidae =====
- Actinella actinophora
- Actinella fausta
- Actinella obserata
- Actinella robusta
- Atenia quadrasi
- Caseolus abjectus
- Caseolus consors
- Caseolus hartungi
- Cryptosaccus asturiensis
- Helicella orzai
- Helicella striatitala
- Helicopsis conopsis
- Montserratina bofilliana
- Plentuisa vendia
- Pyrenaearia cotiellae
- Pyrenaearia navasi
- Pyrenaearia oberthueri
- Pyrenaearia organiaca
- Pyrenaearia parva
- Pyrenaearia poncebensis
- Pyrenaearia velascoi
- Spirorbula obtecta
- Suboestophora altamirai
- Suboestophora hispanica
- Xerocrassa jimenensis
- Xerocrassa montserratensis
- Xerocrassa montserratensis betulonensis
- Xerosecta adolfi
- Xerotricha gasulli
- Xerotricha zaratei
- Xerotricha zujarensis

===== Limacidae =====
- Malacolimax wiktori

===== Orculidae =====
- Orcula fuchsi

===== Oxychilidae =====
- Oxychilus basajauna

===== Papillodermatidae =====
- Papilloderma altonagai

===== Polygyridae =====
- Ashmunella pasonis
- Polygyra hippocrepis
- Polygyra peregrina

===== Pupillidae =====
- Gyliotrachela catherina
- Pupilla ficulnea

===== Rhytididae =====
- Paryphanta busbyi
- Powelliphanta marchantii
- Tasmaphena lamproides
- Victaphanta atramentaria

===== Streptaxidae =====
- Gonospira bourguignati

===== Subulinidae =====
- Beckianum sinistrum
- Leptinaria strebeliana

===== Succineidae =====
- Catinella arenaria
- Succinea sanctaehelenae

===== Trissexodontidae =====
- Oestophora ortizi

===== Valloniidae =====
- Pupisoma sp. nov. 1
- Vallonia declivis

===== Vertiginidae =====
- Vertigo alabamensis
- Vertigo arthuri
- Vertigo hebardi
- Vertigo hubricti
- Vertigo occulta
- Vertigo ovata

===== Vitrinidae =====
- Plutonia machadoi
- Plutonia mascaensis
- Plutonia tuberculata

===== Zonitidae =====
- Paravitrea clappi
- Trochomorpha melvillensis
- Zonites anaphiensis

== Nemertina ==
=== Enopla ===
==== Hoplonemertea ====
===== Prosorhochmidae =====
- Argonemertes hillii

== Onychophora ==
=== Onychophora ===
==== Onychophora ====
===== Peripatidae =====
- Plicatoperipatus jamaicensis
