= Hylarana chitwanensis =

Conservation status
- Data Deficient (IUCN 3.1)

Scientific classification
- Kingdom: Animalia
- Phylum: Chordata
- Class: Amphibia
- Order: Anura
- Family: Ranidae
- Genus: Hylarana
- Species: H. chitwanensis

Binomial name
- Hylarana chitwanensis (Das, 1998)

Synonyms
- Rana chitwanensis Das, 1998; Sylvirana chitwanensis (Das, 1998)

Species of frog

Hylarana chitwanensis is a species of frog in the family Ranidae endemic to Nepal. Its type locality is in the Chitwan National Park. Earlier reports from India are erroneous although it is likely to occur there.

Hylarana chitwanensis is a lowland species, occurring at altitudes less than 500 m (1,600 ft) asl in the Himalayan foothills. Its natural habitats are terai grasslands, bushes and tropical Shorea forests. It is threatened by habitat loss caused by logging and dam construction.
