= Pristimantis sanguineus =

Conservation status
- Near Threatened (IUCN 3.1)

Scientific classification
- Kingdom: Animalia
- Phylum: Chordata
- Class: Amphibia
- Order: Anura
- Clade: Brachycephaloidea
- Family: Craugastoridae
- Genus: Pristimantis
- Species: P. sanguineus

Binomial name
- Pristimantis sanguineus (Lynch, 1998)

Synonyms
- Eleutherodactylus sanguineus Lynch, 1998

Species of frog

Pristimantis sanguineus is a species of frog in the family Strabomantidae. It is endemic to Colombia. Its natural habitats are tropical moist lowland forests, moist montane forests, and rivers. It is threatened by habitat loss.
