= Cyrtodactylus redimiculus =

Conservation status
- Near Threatened (IUCN 3.1)

Scientific classification
- Kingdom: Animalia
- Phylum: Chordata
- Class: Reptilia
- Order: Squamata
- Suborder: Gekkota
- Family: Gekkonidae
- Genus: Cyrtodactylus
- Species: C. redimiculus

Binomial name
- Cyrtodactylus redimiculus King, 1962
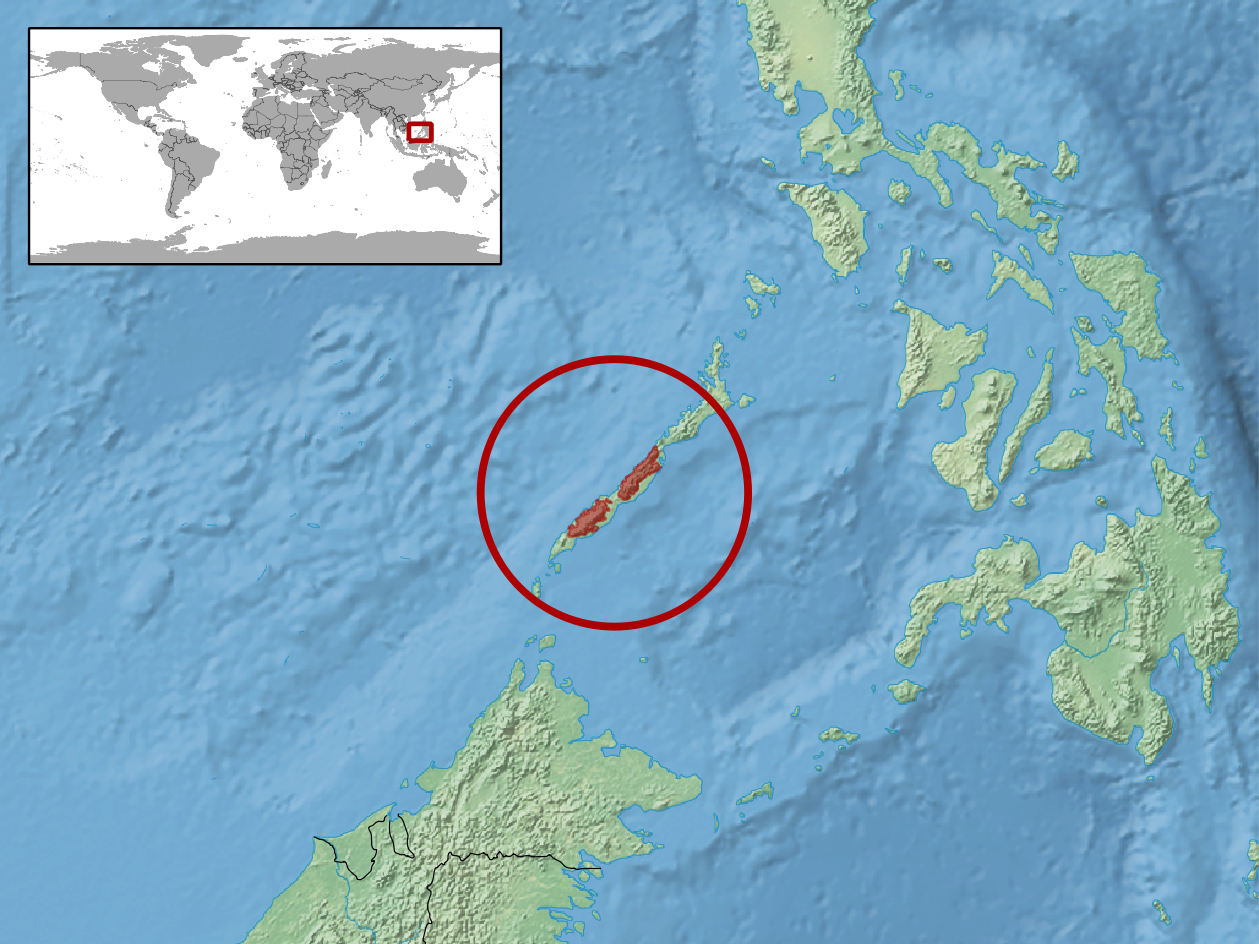

Synonyms
- Gymnodactylus redimiculus

Species of lizard

Cyrtodactylus redimiculus, also known as the Palawan bow-fingered gecko or Palawan bent-toed gecko, is a species of gecko that is endemic to Palawan in the Philippines.
