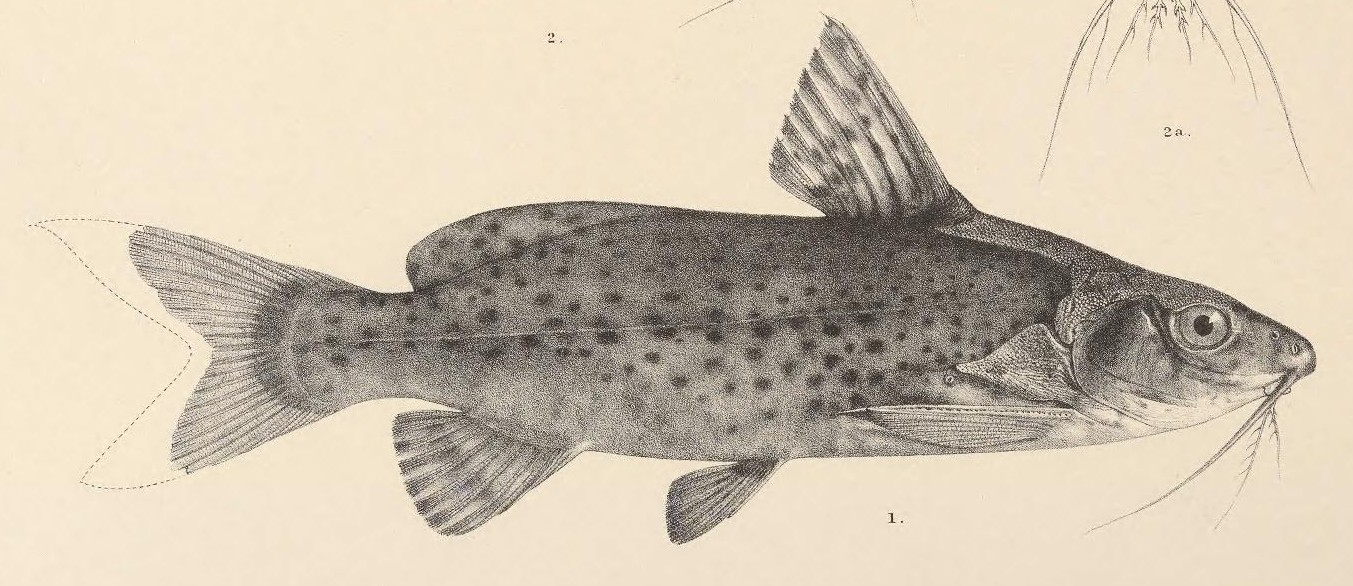

Conservation status
- Least Concern (IUCN 3.1)

Scientific classification
- Kingdom: Animalia
- Phylum: Chordata
- Class: Actinopterygii
- Order: Siluriformes
- Family: Mochokidae
- Genus: Synodontis
- Species: S. victoriae

Binomial name
- Synodontis victoriae Boulenger, 1906

= Lake Victoria squeaker =

Species of fish

The Lake Victoria squeaker (Synodontis victoriae) is a species of upside-down catfish that is native to Kenya, Burundi, Tanzania and Uganda where it is found in Lakes Kioga and Victoria and the Victorian Nile in the lower Kagera River and the Malagarasi River drainage. It was first described by British-Belgian zoologist George Albert Boulenger in 1906, from specimens collected in the Lake Victoria at Buganga, Uganda and Entebbe, Uganda by Mr. E. Degen. The species name victoriae is derived from the location where the species was originally discovered, Lake Victoria.

== Description ==
Like all members of the genus Synodontis, S. victoriae has a strong, bony head capsule that extends back as far as the first spine of the dorsal fin. The head contains a distinct narrow, bony, external protrusion called a humeral process. The shape and size of the humeral process helps to identify the species. In S. victoriae, the humeral process is rough, about 1 1/2 times as long as it is broad, and acutely pointed.

The fish has three pairs of barbels. The maxillary barbels are on located on the upper jaw, and two pairs of mandibular barbels are on the lower jaw. The maxillary barbel is long and straight without any branches, with a narrow membrane at the base. It extends almost the length of the head. The outer pair of mandibular barbels is about twice the length of the inner pair, and both pairs have slender, simple branches.

The front edges of the dorsal fins and the pectoral fins of Syntontis species are hardened into stiff spines. In S. victoriae, the spine of the dorsal fin is slightly shorter than the head, straight, smooth in the front and serrated on the back. The remaining portion of the dorsal fin is made up of six to seven branching rays. The spine of the pectoral fin is about the same size as the dorsal spine, and serrated on both sides. The adipose fin is 4 to 5 times as long as it is deep. The anal fin contains four unbranched and eight branched rays. The tail, or caudal fin, is deeply forked, and the upper lobe is longer.

All members of Syndontis have a structure called a premaxillary toothpad, which is located on the very front of the upper jaw of the mouth. This structure contains several rows of short, chisel-shaped teeth. In S. victoriae, the toothpad forms a short and broad band. On the lower jaw, or mandible, the teeth of Syndontis are attached to flexible, stalk-like structures and described as "s-shaped" or "hooked". The number of teeth on the mandible is used to differentiate between species; in S. victoriae, there are 19 to 21 teeth on the mandible.

The body color is brown or greyish silver on the back, white on the underside, with large round darker spots, which may be indistinct. Spots sometimes appear on the caudal fin.

The maximum standard length of the species is 35 centimetres (14 in). Generally, females in the genus Synodontis tend to be slightly larger than males of the same age.

== Habitat and behavior ==
In the wild, the species has been found in Lake Victoria and the Victoria Nile basin, including smaller tributaries and lakes. It has also been found in the Malagarasi River. It is found in shallow waters of lakes and rivers, most often around 20 metres (66 ft) of depth. The reproductive habits of most of the species of Synodontis are not known, beyond some instances of obtaining egg counts from gravid females. Spawning likely occurs during the flooding season between July and October, and pairs swim in unison during spawning. The population of the species is decreasing, largely due to the competition from introduced Nile perch in its ecosystem. It feeds small snails, where it is able to extract the flesh without crushing the shells. It also feeds on insects, small fish, and ostracods. The growth rate is rapid in the first year, then slows down as the fish age.
