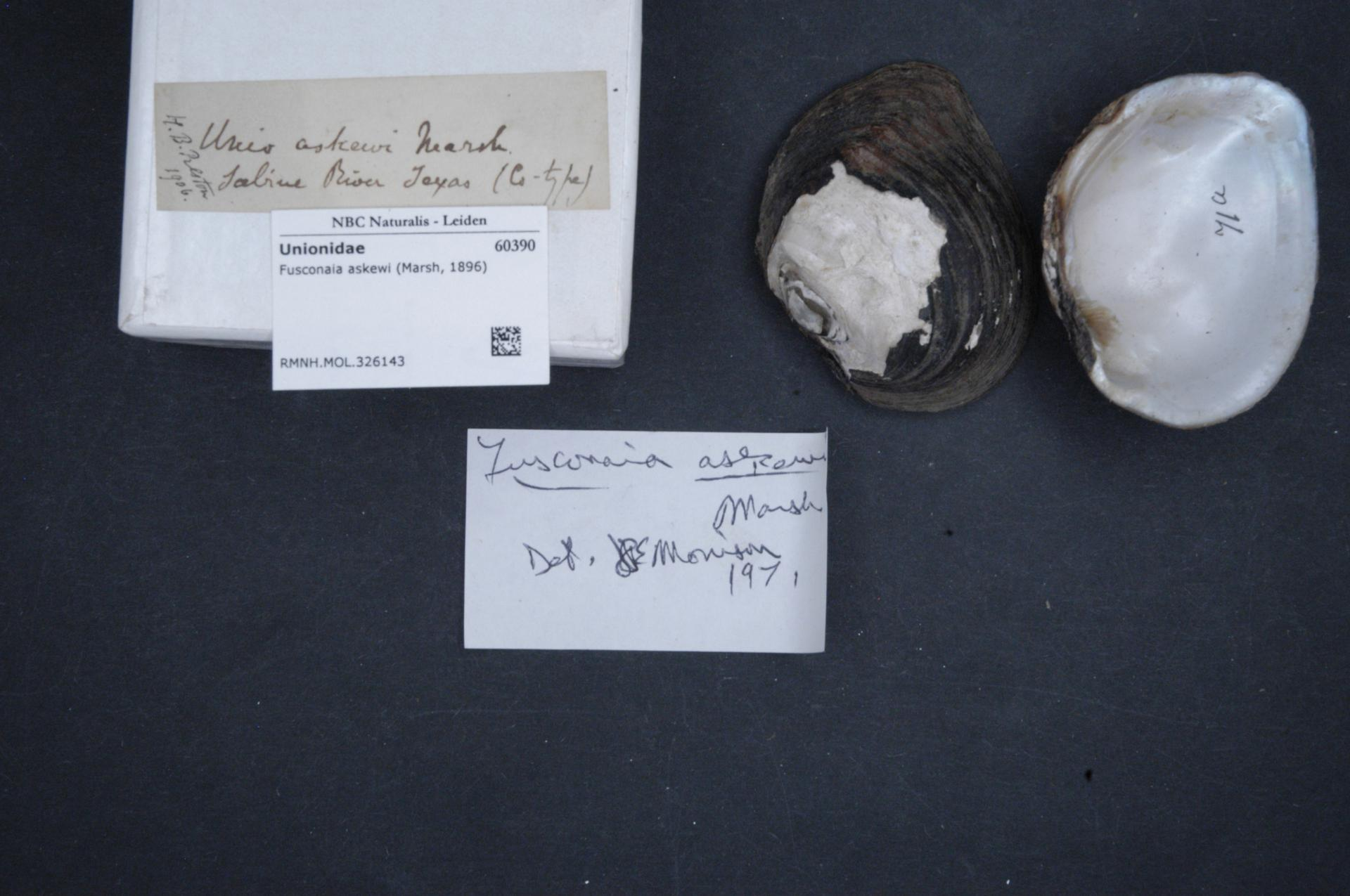
- Fusconaia askewi shells

Conservation status
- Near Threatened (IUCN 2.3)

- Imperiled (NatureServe)

Scientific classification
- Kingdom: Animalia
- Phylum: Mollusca
- Class: Bivalvia
- Order: Unionida
- Family: Unionidae
- Genus: Fusconaia
- Species: F. askewi

Binomial name
- Fusconaia askewi Marsh, 1896

= Fusconaia askewi =

Species of bivalve

Fusconaia askewi is a species of bivalve in the family Unionidae. It is endemic to the United States.
