= Pristimantis jubatus =

Conservation status
- Near Threatened (IUCN 3.1)

Scientific classification
- Kingdom: Animalia
- Phylum: Chordata
- Class: Amphibia
- Order: Anura
- Family: Strabomantidae
- Genus: Pristimantis
- Species: P. jubatus

Binomial name
- Pristimantis jubatus (García and Lynch, 2006)
- Pristimantis jubatus is known from Munchique National Park (type locality, circle) and Farallones de Cali Natural Park (triangle)

Synonyms
- Eleutherodactylus jubatus García and Lynch, 2006

Species of frog

Pristimantis jubatus is a species of frog in the family Strabomantidae. It is endemic to Cordillera Occidental (Colombian Andes) and is known from the vicinity of its type locality in the Munchique National Park (Cauca Department) and from Farallones de Cali (Valle del Cauca Department). The specific name jubatus is Latin for "crested" and refers to the cranial crests of this frog.

== Description ==
Adult males measure 20–31 mm (0.8–1.2 in) and adult females 32–38 mm (1.3–1.5 in) in snout–vent length. The head is wider than it is long, and wider than the body in males but nearly as wide as the body in females. The snout is round. Cranial crests are present. The tympanum is prominent. The supratympanic fold is not distinct but obscures the upper edge of the tympanum. The dorsolateral folds are prominent. The fingers have lateral fringes and, apart from the thumb, round terminal discs with broad pads. The toes are similarly fringed and have terminal discs that are smaller than those of the outer fingers. Dorsal coloration is orange-brown, ochre sparkling, or brown-cream. There is usually a black W-like pattern on the back. The venter is cream or yellow golden and has brown or gray spotting. The throat is cream or pale yellow with gray spotting. The flanks are cream or brown-cream with brown reticulation. The iris is golden orange and has black reticulum.

== Habitat and ecology ==
Pristimantis jubatus inhabits humid montane forests at elevations of 2,550–3,084 m (8,366–10,118 ft) above sea level. They are active by night in humid understory vegetation, less than 2 meters above the ground. Adults occur higher in the vegetation than juveniles. Development is direct (i.e., there is no free-living larval stage), with reproduction apparently taking place throughout the year.

Pristimantis jubatus forages opportunistically on arthropods available in its habitat, with dipterans and hymenopterans dominating its diet, followed by spiders and coleopterans.

== Conservation ==
Pristimantis jubatus is abundant in the Munchique National Park. It is currently not facing any threats, but it could in future be threatened by expansion of pine plantations. In Farallones de Cali Natural Park, illegal gold mining is a threat.
