= Lanistes elliptus =

Conservation status
- Near Threatened (IUCN 2.3)

Scientific classification
- Kingdom: Animalia
- Phylum: Mollusca
- Class: Gastropoda
- Subclass: Caenogastropoda
- Order: Architaenioglossa
- Family: Ampullariidae
- Genus: Lanistes
- Species: L. elliptus

Binomial name
- Lanistes elliptus Martens

Species of gastropod

Lanistes elliptus is a species of large freshwater snail, an aquatic gastropod mollusk with a gill and an operculum in the family Ampullariidae, the apple snails.

It is found in the Democratic Republic of the Congo, Malawi, and Mozambique.
