= Pristimantis juanchoi =

Conservation status
- Vulnerable (IUCN 3.1)

Scientific classification
- Kingdom: Animalia
- Phylum: Chordata
- Class: Amphibia
- Order: Anura
- Clade: Brachycephaloidea
- Family: Craugastoridae
- Genus: Pristimantis
- Species: P. juanchoi

Binomial name
- Pristimantis juanchoi (Lynch, 1996)

Synonyms
- Eleutherodactylus juanchoi Lynch, 1996

Species of frog

Pristimantis juanchoi is a species of frog in the family Strabomantidae. It is endemic to Colombia. Its natural habitats are tropical moist montane forests, rural gardens, and heavily degraded former forest. It is threatened by habitat loss.
