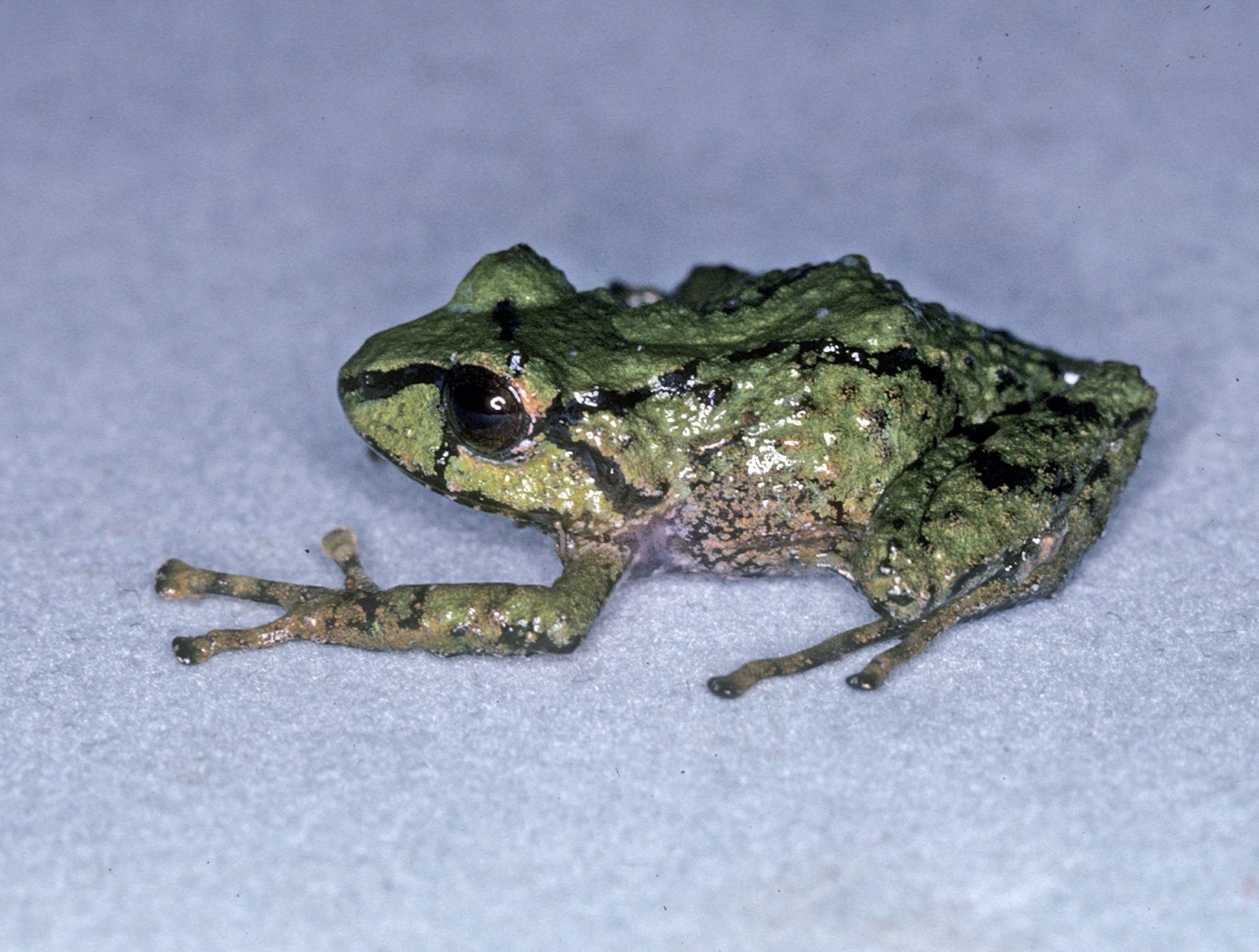

Conservation status
- Near Threatened (IUCN 3.1)

Scientific classification
- Kingdom: Animalia
- Phylum: Chordata
- Class: Amphibia
- Order: Anura
- Clade: Brachycephaloidea
- Family: Craugastoridae
- Genus: Pristimantis
- Species: P. vicarius

Binomial name
- Pristimantis vicarius (Lynch & Ruíz-Carranza, 1983)

Synonyms
- Eleutherodactylus vicarius Lynch & Ruíz-Carranza, 1983

= Pristimantis vicarius =

Species of frog

Pristimantis vicarius is a species of frog in the family Strabomantidae. It is endemic to Colombia. Its natural habitats are tropical moist montane forests, high-altitude shrubland, high-altitude grassland, and rivers. It is threatened by habitat loss.
