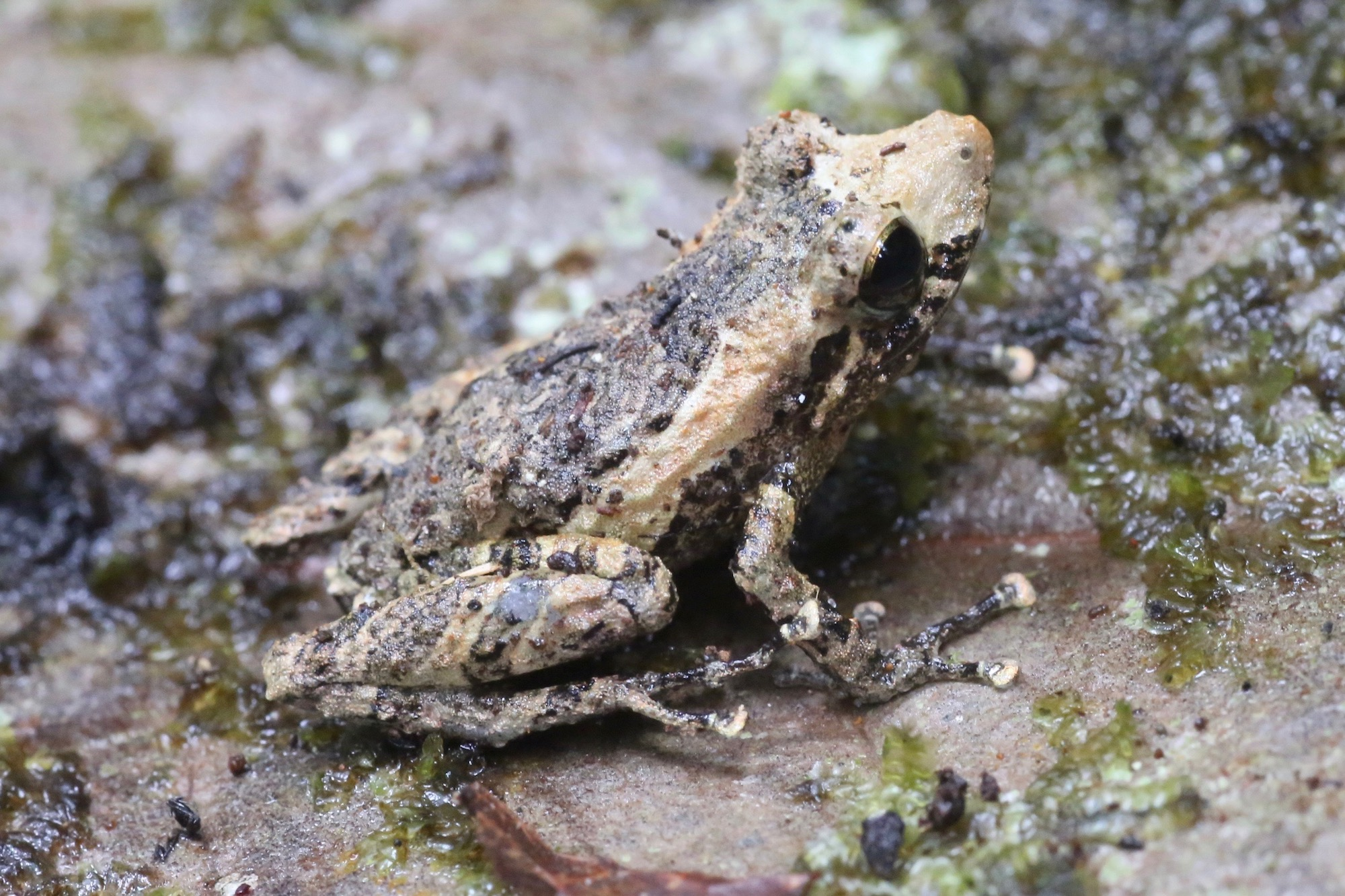
- Male from Mindo, Pichincha Province, Ecuador.

Conservation status
- Near Threatened (IUCN 3.1)

Scientific classification
- Kingdom: Animalia
- Phylum: Chordata
- Class: Amphibia
- Order: Anura
- Clade: Brachycephaloidea
- Family: Craugastoridae
- Genus: Pristimantis
- Species: P. luteolateralis

Binomial name
- Pristimantis luteolateralis (Lynch, 1976)

Synonyms
- Eleutherodactylus luteolateralis Lynch, 1976

= Pristimantis luteolateralis =

Species of frog

Pristimantis luteolateralis is a species of frog in the family Strabomantidae. It is endemic to Ecuador. Its natural habitats are tropical moist montane forests, pastureland, plantations, rural gardens, and heavily degraded former forest.
