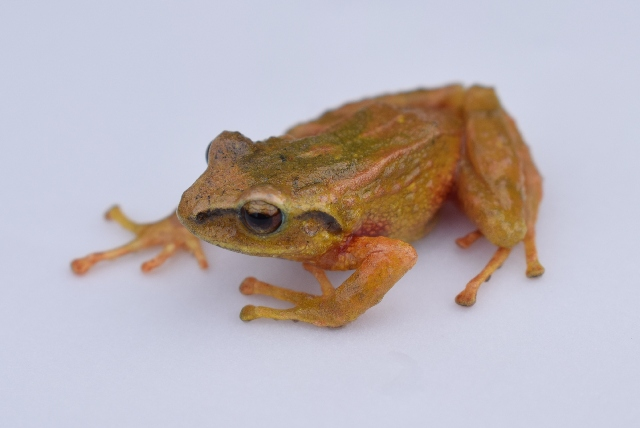

Conservation status
- Vulnerable (IUCN 3.1)

Scientific classification
- Kingdom: Animalia
- Phylum: Chordata
- Class: Amphibia
- Order: Anura
- Clade: Brachycephaloidea
- Family: Craugastoridae
- Genus: Pristimantis
- Species: P. anolirex

Binomial name
- Pristimantis anolirex (Lynch, 1983)

Synonyms
- Eleutherodactylus anolirex Lynch, 1983

= Pristimantis anolirex =

Species of frog

Pristimantis anolirex is a species of frog in the family Strabomantidae. It is found in Colombia and Venezuela. Its natural habitats are tropical moist montane forests, high-altitude shrubland, and high-altitude grassland. It is threatened by habitat loss.
