= Pristimantis tamsitti =

Conservation status
- Vulnerable (IUCN 3.1)

Scientific classification
- Kingdom: Animalia
- Phylum: Chordata
- Class: Amphibia
- Order: Anura
- Clade: Brachycephaloidea
- Family: Craugastoridae
- Genus: Pristimantis
- Species: P. tamsitti

Binomial name
- Pristimantis tamsitti (Cochran & Goin, 1970)

Synonyms
- Eleutherodactylus latidiscus ssp. tamsitti Cochran & Goin, 1970; Eleutherodactylus tamsitti Cochran & Goin, 1970

Species of frog

Pristimantis tamsitti is a species of frog in the family Strabomantidae. It is endemic to Colombia. Its natural habitats are tropical moist montane forests and rivers. It is threatened by habitat loss.
