= Pristimantis illotus =

Conservation status
- Near Threatened (IUCN 3.1)

Scientific classification
- Kingdom: Animalia
- Phylum: Chordata
- Class: Amphibia
- Order: Anura
- Clade: Brachycephaloidea
- Family: Craugastoridae
- Genus: Pristimantis
- Species: P. illotus

Binomial name
- Pristimantis illotus (Lynch & Duellman, 1997)

Synonyms
- Eleutherodactylus illotus Lynch & Duellman, 1997

Species of amphibian

Pristimantis illotus is a species of frog in the family Strabomantidae. It is found on the Cordillera Occidental in Valle del Cauca and Cauca Departments in Colombia and southwards to the Pichincha Province, Ecuador.

Its natural habitats are cloud forests. It is threatened by habitat loss (deforestation) and pollution (spraying illegal crops).

Pristimantis illotus has a direct development reproduction strategy; embryos develop fully in terrestrial eggs, and then emerge as small froglets without a free-living tadpole stage. In common with many Andean Pristimantis, P. illotus resides in the leaf litter of moist forests where temperature and moisture are stable throughout the year.
