= Pristimantis pardalis =

Conservation status
- Least Concern (IUCN 3.1)

Scientific classification
- Kingdom: Animalia
- Phylum: Chordata
- Class: Amphibia
- Order: Anura
- Clade: Brachycephaloidea
- Family: Craugastoridae
- Genus: Pristimantis
- Species: P. pardalis

Binomial name
- Pristimantis pardalis (Barbour, 1928)

Synonyms
- Eleutherodactylus pardalis (Barbour, 1928)

Species of frog

Pristimantis pardalis is a species of frog in the family Strabomantidae. It is found in Costa Rica and Panama. Its natural habitats are tropical moist lowland forests and moist montane forests. It is threatened by habitat loss.
