= Pristimantis percnopterus =

Conservation status
- Least Concern (IUCN 3.1)

Scientific classification
- Kingdom: Animalia
- Phylum: Chordata
- Class: Amphibia
- Order: Anura
- Clade: Brachycephaloidea
- Family: Craugastoridae
- Genus: Pristimantis
- Species: P. percnopterus

Binomial name
- Pristimantis percnopterus (Duellman & Pramuk, 1999)

Synonyms
- Eleutherodactylus percnopterus Duellman & Pramuk, 1999

Species of frog

Pristimantis percnopterus is a species of frog in the family Strabomantidae. It is found in the Cordillera del Cóndor and northern Cordillera Central, Peru. Its natural habitat is humid and semi-arid montane forests. It is threatened by habitat loss (deforestation).
