= Gastrotheca andaquiensis =

Conservation status
- Least Concern (IUCN 3.1)

Scientific classification
- Kingdom: Animalia
- Phylum: Chordata
- Class: Amphibia
- Order: Anura
- Family: Hemiphractidae
- Genus: Gastrotheca
- Species: G. andaquiensis

Binomial name
- Gastrotheca andaquiensis Ruiz-Carranza & Hernández-Camacho, 1976

Synonyms
- Gastrotheca andaquiensis Ruiz-Carranza and Hernández-Camacho, 1976; Gastrotheca humbertoi Lutz, 1977; Gastrotheca (Opisthodelphys) andaquiensis – Dubois, 1987; Gastrotheca (Opisthodelphys) humbertoi – Dubois, 1987

Species of frog

Gastrotheca andaquiensis, commonly known as the Andes marsupial frog, is a species of frog in the family Hemiphractidae. It is found on the Amazonian slopes of the Andes in southern Colombia and Ecuador.

== Description ==
Gastrotheca andaquiensis is a large member of its genus with a snout–vent length of 77 mm (3 in). The head has a rounded snout, a slightly projecting upper lip, a large pit below each nostril, and bluntly-pointed horn-like appendages above the eyes. The tympani are ovoid and prominent. The body is robust, with granular skin and a mixture of larger and smaller granules. There is a deeply-sunk slit opening in the scapular region of the back leading into a brood pouch. There are spines on the heels and both fingers and toes are equipped with adhesive discs. In general, males are brown and females are green, but there is considerable variation between individuals, and a part-grown male has been observed which was pale green suffused with bronze. The irises are pale green, the tongue and interior of the mouth are blue, and the discs on fingers and toes are jade green.

== Distribution and habitat ==
Gastrotheca andaquiensis is endemic to Colombia and Ecuador on the eastern foothills of the Andes. It is an arboreal frog occurring in cloud forest in foliage near water where there are trees with plenty of epiphytic growth. Its altitudinal range is between about 1,000 and 2,000 m (3,300 and 6,600 ft).

The frog's known range overlaps that of several protected parks in both countries: Reserva Ecológica Cayambe-Coca, Reserva Ecológica Antisana, Parque Nacional Sumaco Napo-Galeras, Parque Nacional Llanganates, Parque Nacional Sangay, and Parque Nacional Natural Cueva de los Guacheros.

== Ecology ==
This species is called a marsupial frog because the female carries the eggs and developing froglets in the pouch on her back. About ten large eggs are laid in a clutch and after fertilisation, the male assists the female to insert them into her pouch. Here they develop directly into juvenile frogs without an intervening tadpole stage, eventually hopping away from their mother.

== Status ==
This frog has a wide range and is a moderately common species in at least parts of its range. The main threats it faces include habitat loss from livestock grazing and both legal and illegal crop cultivation but its range includes a number of protected areas. The International Union for Conservation of Nature has rated its conservation status as being of "least concern" because any decrease in population size is likely to be at too slow a rate to justify classifying it in a more threatened category.
