= Limnonectes rhacoda =

Conservation status
- Least Concern (IUCN 3.1)

Scientific classification
- Kingdom: Animalia
- Phylum: Chordata
- Class: Amphibia
- Order: Anura
- Family: Dicroglossidae
- Genus: Limnonectes
- Species: L. rhacoda

Binomial name
- Limnonectes rhacoda (Inger, Boeadi & Taufik, 1996)

Species of frog

Limnonectes rhacoda is a species of frog in the family Dicroglossidae. It is found in Indonesia and possibly Malaysia. Its natural habitats are subtropical or tropical moist lowland forests, rivers, freshwater marshes, and intermittent freshwater marshes. It is becoming rare due to habitat loss.
