= Trochidrobia punicea =

Conservation status
- Least Concern (IUCN 3.1)

Scientific classification
- Kingdom: Animalia
- Phylum: Mollusca
- Class: Gastropoda
- Subclass: Caenogastropoda
- Order: Littorinimorpha
- Family: Tateidae
- Genus: Trochidrobia
- Species: T. punicea

Binomial name
- Trochidrobia punicea Ponder, Hershler & Jenkins, 1989

Species of gastropod

Trochidrobia punicea is a species of very small freshwater snail, an aquatic gastropod mollusk in the family Tateidae.

This species is endemic to Australia.
