= Oxychilus basajauna =

Conservation status
- Endangered (IUCN 3.1)

Scientific classification
- Kingdom: Animalia
- Phylum: Mollusca
- Class: Gastropoda
- Order: Stylommatophora
- Family: Oxychilidae
- Genus: Oxychilus
- Species: O. basajauna

Binomial name
- Oxychilus basajauna Atlonaga, 1990

Species of gastropod

Oxychilus basajauna is a species of land snail in the family Oxychilidae. It is native to Spain.
