= Pristimantis spinosus =

Conservation status
- Endangered (IUCN 3.1)

Scientific classification
- Kingdom: Animalia
- Phylum: Chordata
- Class: Amphibia
- Order: Anura
- Clade: Brachycephaloidea
- Family: Craugastoridae
- Genus: Pristimantis
- Species: P. spinosus

Binomial name
- Pristimantis spinosus (Lynch, 1979)

Synonyms
- Eleutherodactylus spinosus Lynch, 1979

Species of frog

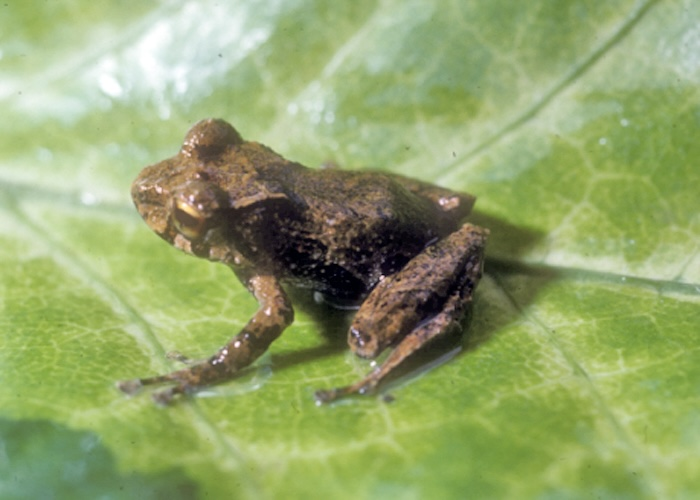

Pristimantis spinosus is a species of frog in the family Strabomantidae. It is a small brown-backed frog with postorbital dermal folds, its belly is cream to black, and the posterior surfaces of its thighs and groin are black with white dots. It is found in Ecuador and possibly Peru. Its natural habitat is tropical moist montane forests. It is threatened by habitat loss.
