= Pristimantis alalocophus =

Conservation status
- Endangered (IUCN 3.1)

Scientific classification
- Kingdom: Animalia
- Phylum: Chordata
- Class: Amphibia
- Order: Anura
- Clade: Brachycephaloidea
- Family: Craugastoridae
- Genus: Pristimantis
- Species: P. alalocophus

Binomial name
- Pristimantis alalocophus (Roa-Trujillo & Ruíz-Carranza, 1991)

Synonyms
- Eleutherodactylus alalocophus Roa-Trujillo & Ruíz-Carranza, 1991

Species of frog

Pristimantis alalocophus is a species of frog in the family Strabomantidae. It is endemic to Colombia. Its natural habitats are tropical moist montane forests and rivers.
