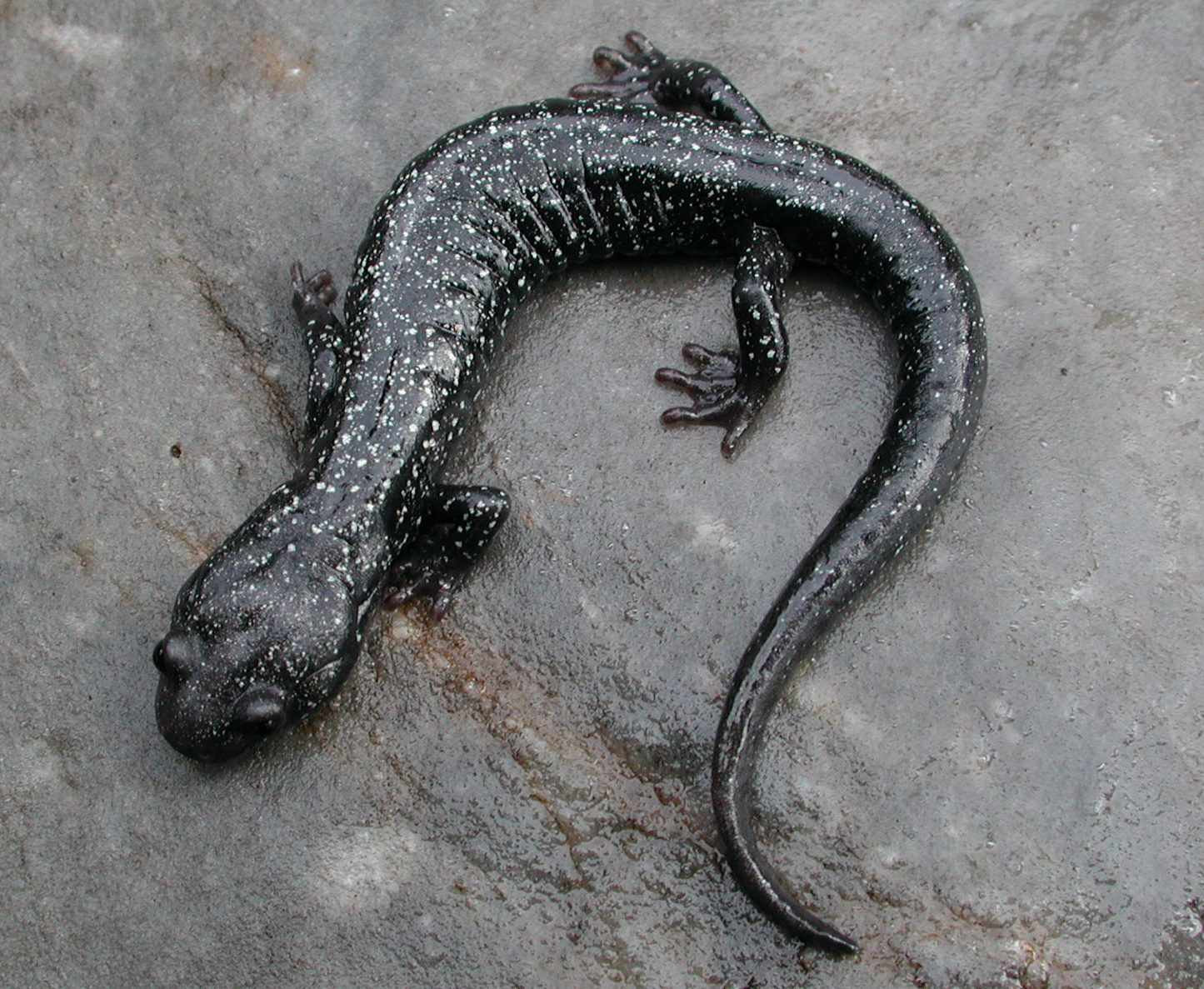

Conservation status
- Endangered (IUCN 3.1)

Scientific classification
- Kingdom: Animalia
- Phylum: Chordata
- Class: Amphibia
- Order: Urodela
- Family: Plethodontidae
- Genus: Aneides
- Species: A. iecanus

Binomial name
- Aneides iecanus (Cope, 1883)

= Shasta black salamander =

Species of salamander

The Shasta black salamander (Aneides iecanus) is a species of salamander in the family Plethodontidae. It is endemic to Shasta County in California.

== Taxonomy ==
Described by Edward Drinker Cope in 1883, it was later synonymized with the speckled black salamander (A. flavipunctatus). However, a 2019 taxonomic study confirmed it as being a distinct species, and again split it.

== Distribution ==
It is thought to be restricted to western Shasta County, mainly in the vicinity of Shasta Lake, but may extend into extreme southern Siskyou and Tehama counties.

== Description ==
It is a large, black salamander with white spots. It can be distinguished from the rest of the A. flavipunctatus complex by its heavily speckled body, head, and tail, and on average has one less trunk vertebra than A. klamathensis or A. niger.

== Status ==
It is classified as Endangered on the IUCN Red List due to its limited range, much of which was lost during the creation of Shasta Lake, as well as proposals to raise the Shasta Dam, which would have a highly damaging impact on remaining habitat.
