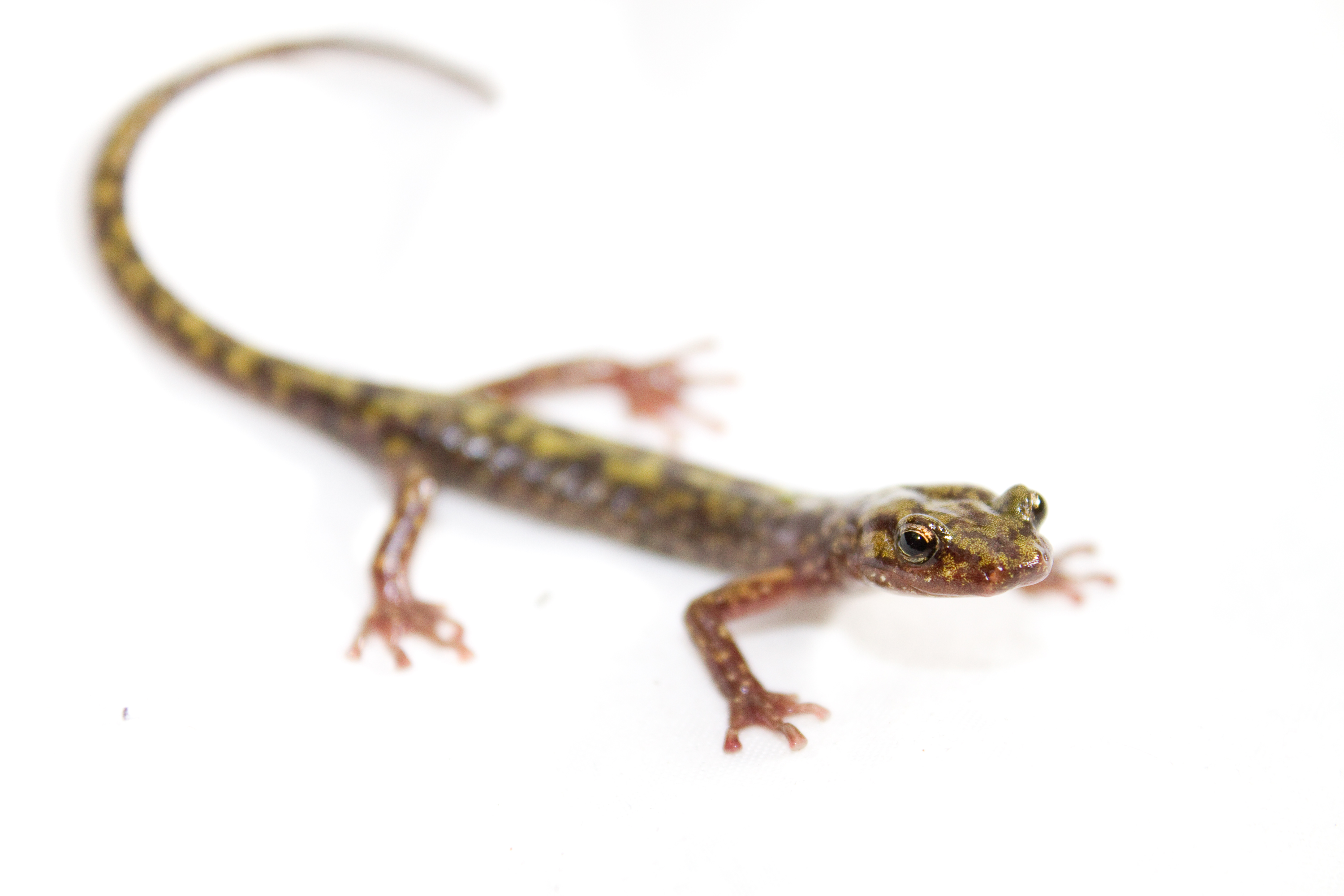

Conservation status
- Near Threatened (IUCN 3.1)

Scientific classification
- Kingdom: Animalia
- Phylum: Chordata
- Class: Amphibia
- Order: Urodela
- Family: Plethodontidae
- Genus: Aneides
- Subgenus: Castaneides
- Species: A. aeneus

Binomial name
- Aneides aeneus (Cope & Packard, 1881)

Synonyms
- Plethodon aeneus Cope and Packard, 1881

= Green salamander =

Species of amphibian

The green salamander (Aneides aeneus) is a species of lungless salamander in the family Plethodontidae. It and the Hickory Nut Gorge green salamander (A. caryaensis) are the only currently-described members of the genus Aneides that inhabit any areas in the eastern half of United States (all other Aneides salamanders are found west of the Mississippi River). Rarely seen in the field, the green salamander is an extremely habitat-specific terrestrial species that is seldom found away from its preferred surroundings: moist, shaded rock crevices. Green salamanders have one of the most specialized niches of any salamander.

== Description and taxonomy ==
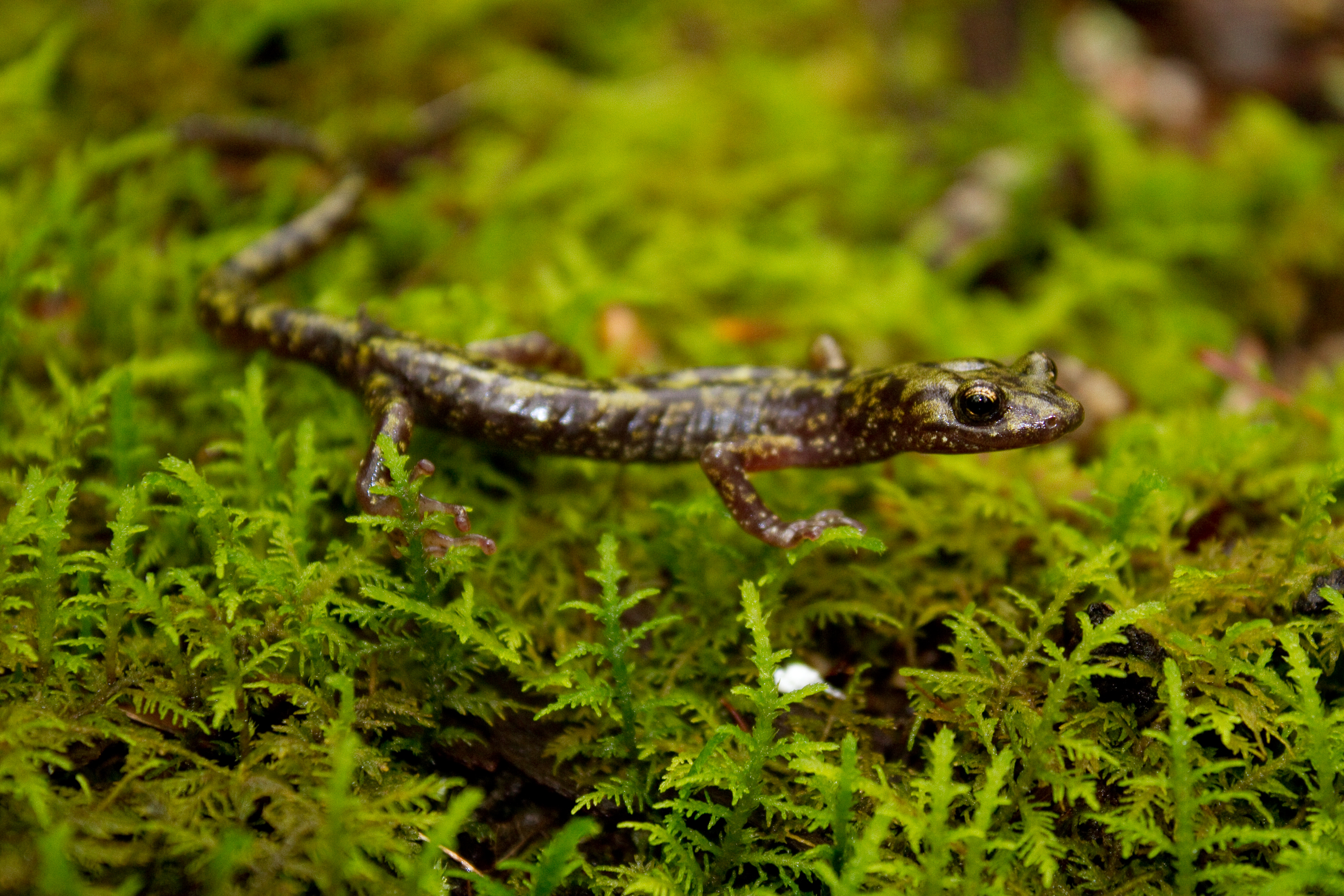

The green salamander's scientific name is Aneides aeneus. The generic name, Aneides, is Greek for "lacking form or shape", in reference to its flattened, elongated body. The specific epithet, aeneus, is Latin, meaning bronze or copper, and refers to its dorsal coloration. The green salamander is small and notably flat. Green, lichen-like blotches against a darker dorsum make A. aeneus the only salamander in North America with green markings. A. aeneus possesses squared toe-tips, large, conspicuous eyes, and a light blue to yellow ventral surface. The square toe-tips, as well as a prehensile tail, are morphological adaptations that help the salamander with climbing. Adults range from 8 to 12 cm (3 to 5 inches) in total length (tail included), with 14 to 15 costal grooves.

Aeneus was formerly considered the only species of the genus Aneides found in the Eastern United States. However, some claimed that there could be up to four different species of Aneides between the Cumberland Plateau and Blue Ridge Escarpment populations. A 2019 study found several A. aeneus populations to represent distinct taxonomic groups, supporting the presence of a possible species complex. At least one was found to represent a distinct species in its own right, the Hickory Nut Gorge green salamander (Aneides caryaensis). The subgenus Castaneides was created to contain all eastern species of Aneides, with A. caryaensis being the most basal member of the complex. Castaneides diverged from the Aneides hardii lineage between 27.2 and 32.3 million years ago. Aneides aeneus is considered the most primitive of its genus.

Members of Castaneides are the only salamanders in North America with green markings. Due also to their hyper-specific habitat, they are almost unmistakable when found in the field.

== Geographic distribution ==
Aneides aeneus is known to inhabit both the Alleghenies and Cumberland Plateau, reaching from southwestern Pennsylvania to northern Alabama and northeastern Mississippi. It is also commonly found in South-Central Ohio. Isolated populations are known at the Blue Ridge Escarpment at the junction of Georgia, North Carolina and South Carolina. The range of the Alleghenies and Cumberland Plateau extends southwest from Fayette County, Pennsylvania through eastern West Virginia, eastern Kentucky, the extreme western portions of Virginia, Tennessee, and Alabama. The population discovered in 1930 in the Great Smoky Mountains National Park has not been located since. There may be disjunct populations on Clinch Mountain, on Bays Mountain and the Appalachian Ridge and Valley, and in the Inner Central Basin of Tennessee.

== Life history ==
Aneides aeneus is an extreme habitat specialist. This species of Aneides is found almost exclusively in an environment following these guidelines. A. aeneus prefers the crevices of rocks on the sides of cliffs or other outcroppings. In most crevices in which A. aeneus is observed, there is little to no sun light allowed. This shade may be due to either vegetation outside of the crevice or outcroppings above the crevice. While a number of instances of A. aeneus observations in arboreal situations have occurred, most of these instances are in trees either adjacent to rock outcroppings and cliffs, or the specimen in question was located underneath the bark of the tree. Habitat preferences shift seasonally, with trees serving as the primary habitat from May to September, and research suggest that green salamanders are more abundant in habitat at lower elevations with south-facing slopes.

Males are extremely territorial toward other salamanders and would-be predators when disturbed or presented with any manner of threat. Cupp observed aggressive behavior in 45 of 49 instances where a male was placed within an artificial territory of another. Such a high level of aggression is rare in salamanders, and is observed in few other species, though hardly to the degree as observed in A. aeneus. This aggressive behavior, although in different forms, can also be observed in brooding of the female A. aeneus over her eggs. While the male A. aeneus will attack would-be invaders with such actions as butting, snapping, biting or snout-pressing, females will often snap at objects placed within the breeding crevice or near the eggs she guards.

=== Annual cycle ===
==== Breeding period ====
- Aneides aeneus has been observed to begin its period of sex and courtship in late May to early June. The A. aeneus male will enter the breeding crevices and await the arrival of females. These specialized crevices are considered the basis of a green salamander's territory, as they are defended by an individual throughout the breeding season. Once a male and female meet, the courtship begins. Like some salamanders of genus Plethodon, A. aeneus begins courtship with the female straddling the base of the male's tail. In this position, and with periodic nudging and encouragement from the male, the two will traverse a small circle within the rock crevice. After some time in this dance, the male will deposit a spermatophore upon the ground and the female, still straddling the base of the male, eventually makes her way to it and "scoops" it up by lateral undulations and slow movements of the base of the tail of the female.
- Eggs are laid soon after courtship. The female A. aeneus lies on her back within the rock crevice, her ventral surface pressed against the ceiling. Egg-laying often takes a period of 20 to 30 hours, during which time the female will apply an adhesive substance to the surface of the rock, followed by a single egg. Clutches of eggs average 15–25 eggs. The female will stay with the eggs, usually wrapping her body around the cluster or at least pressed against it, guarding them for the entirety of development. When presented with a foreign object, be it a wire, stick, or a wandering insect, the female will attack, eating the invader if possible. Female A. aeneus are not known to feed otherwise during brooding. Individuals taken from their eggs had their stomachs and small intestines examined and were all found to be completely empty in Gordon's study in 1971. This guarding period usually lasts 3 months, and the eggs hatch in September.

==== Dispersal and aggregation ====
- Eggs of Aneides aeneus hatch throughout the month of September. A. aeneus is a direct developing salamander, which means it does not have a larval stage and develops to its adult phase within the egg. Juvenile A. aeneus emerge from the eggs resembling their parents, and will likely leave the crevice in which they were born within 2 months. Following the hatching of its young, the female A. aeneus no longer shows the hyper-aggressiveness expressed during guarding. In fact, it has been observed that the female will do little to stop the collection or otherwise disturbance of her brood after they have hatched from the eggs. Newborn A. aeneus almost always leave the crevice in which they were born and do not return.

==== Hibernation ====
- A period in the annual cycle of Aneides aeneus called the pre-hibernation aggregation takes place in which A. aeneus will disperse from the breeding crevices. It is during this period, throughout the month of November, that most specimens of A. aeneus can be observed wandering over and between rock crevices. Following this dispersal, it is thought that A. aeneus ventures deep within the interconnected crevices of the cliffs and rock outcroppings to hibernate. Attempts were made to find A. aeneus underground, beneath logs, within rotten logs, under rocks and under tree bark, but not a single specimen was produced.

==== Post-hibernation aggregation and dispersal ====
- Aneides aeneus emerges from hibernation around the month of May. During this period, A. aeneus is observed wandering about the rock crevices and outcroppings, often during light rains at night.

== Conservation ==
Efforts aimed towards the conservation of such a secretive organism are proving complicated. While the fact that Aneides aeneus is such a habitat-specific salamander results in more vulnerability to habitat destruction, the cliffs and outcroppings it has chosen are relatively safe from harm. It has been speculated that A. aeneus inhabited the ancient chestnut forest that covered a large percentage of the Great Smoky Mountains National Park. It is not known whether or not A. aeneus utilized these trees more or less than its currently preferred habitat, but it is certainly a possibility. When inhabiting arboreal habitats studies have found that green salamanders prefer hardwood trees to conifers. Green salamanders have been negatively impacted by habitat loss, climate change, disease, and overcollection. A reason overcollection, disease, habitat loss and climate change could be such an issue is that Green Salamanders grow slowly for plethodontids, some studies say that it can take as little as 3 years to reach reproductive maturity, others say from 7–8 yr. to reach reproductive maturity. In Indiana, the green salamander is listed as an endangered species. Green Salamanders are listed as "imperiled" in Georgia and North Carolina as well as "critically imperiled" in South Carolina. In Tennessee, they are considered a Species of Conservation Concern.
