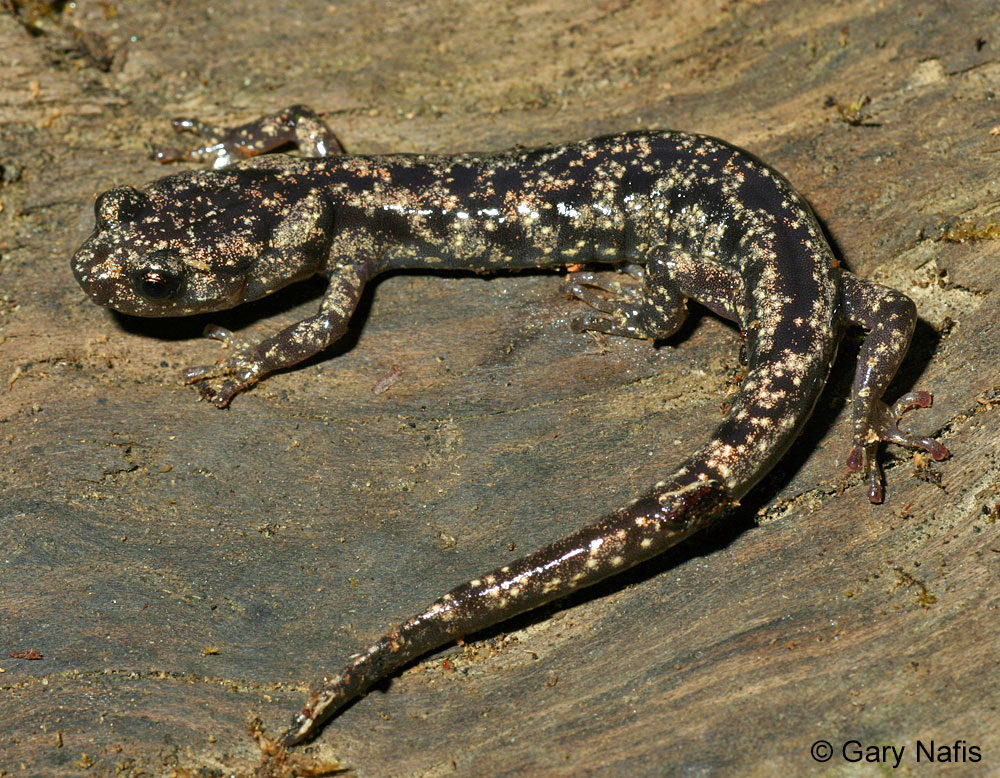

Conservation status
- Least Concern (IUCN 3.1)

Scientific classification
- Kingdom: Animalia
- Phylum: Chordata
- Class: Amphibia
- Order: Urodela
- Family: Plethodontidae
- Genus: Aneides
- Species: A. vagrans

Binomial name
- Aneides vagrans Wake & Jackman, 1998

= Wandering salamander =

Species of amphibian

The wandering salamander (Aneides vagrans) is species of climbing salamander in the family Plethodontidae. It has a disjunct distribution, with one population in northern California and another on Vancouver Island. It is unclear whether this distribution is natural or the result of unintentional human introductions. While it can be found terrestrially, the species is known for its habitation of the forest canopy, particularly in the crowns of coast redwood trees. When disturbed, individuals of this species may leap from trees, gliding and controlling their descent in the air with various physical adaptations.

== Description ==
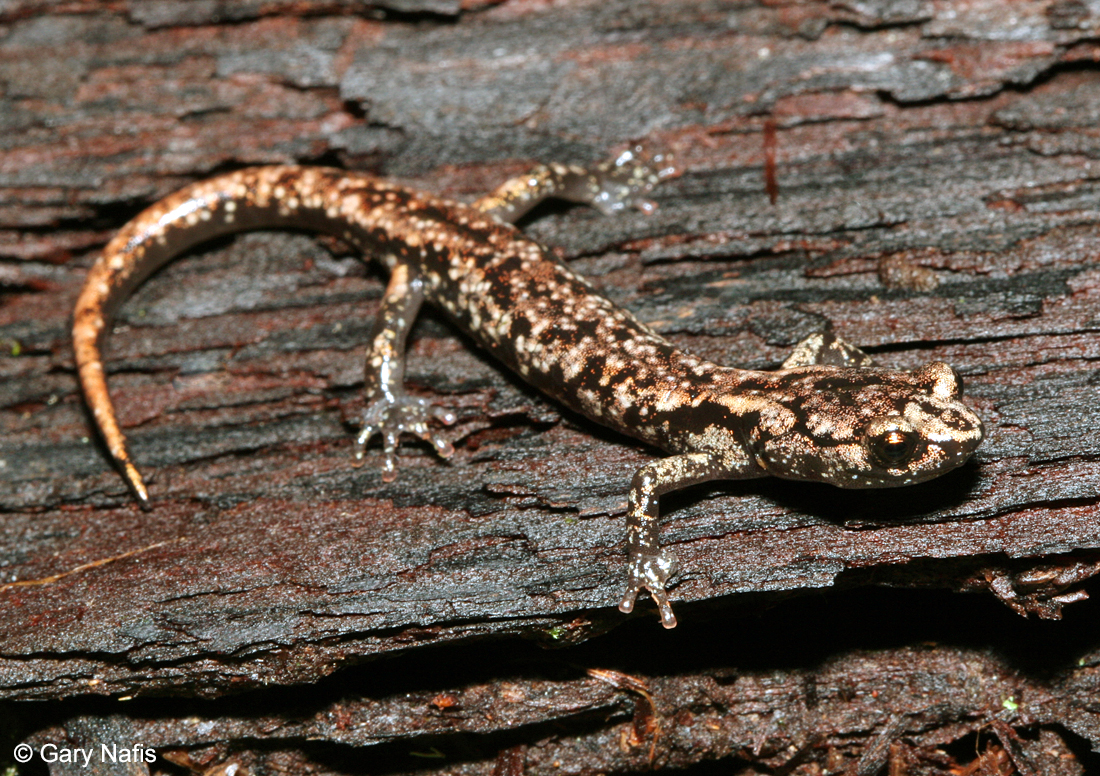
A sub-adult wandering salamander

The wandering salamander is a long, slender salamander that grows to a snout-vent length of approximately 80 millimetres (3.1 in) and a total length of 130 millimetres (5.1 in). Its base color ranges from brown to light grey, with lighter bronze-grey mottling distributed across its dorsal surface. Juveniles also have a coppery-bronze stripe down the spine. The species has between 14 and 16 costal grooves, though 15 is most common. The head is broader and more triangular in males than in females. Like other plethodontid salamanders, they possess a pair of naso-labial grooves between the nostrils and the mouth that are involved in chemoreception.

The species has adaptions conducive to an arboreal lifestyle, with relatively long legs and toes that have expanded terminal pads with square cut ends to aid in both vertical climbing and gliding. The tail is prehensile, round in cross section, and helps the salamander direct its descent when falling.

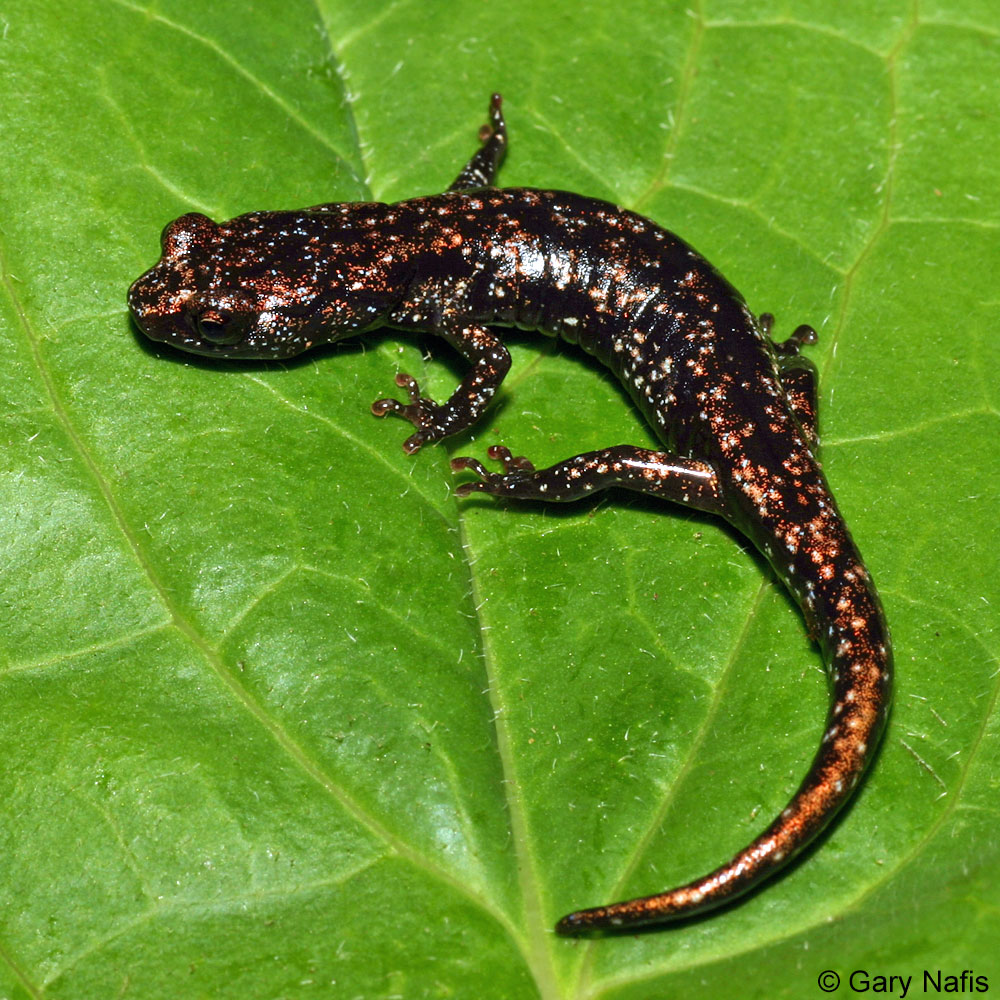
A dark morph sub-adult wandering salamander

The wandering salamander is similar in appearance to the clouded salamander (Aneides ferreus) and they were at one time considered to be the same species.

== Taxonomy ==
The wandering salamander and the clouded salamander were considered the same species until 1998. Prior to splitting, the clouded salamander's range extended from northern California to Oregon, with an adjunct population on Vancouver Island. However, an examination of the mitochondrial DNA and allozymes of populations from various parts of the species' range determined that individuals from California and Vancouver Island were genetically similar to one another and distinct from the populations found in Oregon. The species found in California and Vancouver Island was subsequently dubbed Aneides vagrans, the wandering salamander, while the species found in Oregon retained the name Aneides ferreus.

== Distribution ==
In California, the wandering salamander's range extends from northern Siskiyou and Del Norte Counties, south along the coast through northwestern Sonoma County. The species is widespread in low elevation forests across Vancouver Island and its surrounding islands. The cause of the disjunct distribution of A. vagrans is not certain. There are many theories as to why the species has such an unusual range, but none have been directly studied and therefore remain merely speculative.

It has been postulated that A. vagrans was introduced to Vancouver Island in the nineteenth century via large sheets of tanoak bark imported from California for the tanning industry, and subsequently spread to nearly all the surrounding islets on floating logs. Wandering salamanders are known to inhabit bark crevices, and several leather tanning facilities were established on Vancouver Island in the decades before the first recorded occurrence of the species in 1906. There is also evidence of extensive tanoak bark importation from San Francisco to Vancouver Island in the late 1800s. Tanoak bark shipped from San Francisco was harvested from both standing and fallen trees, and was usually not treated with harsh chemicals prior to shipping, making it possible that salamanders could have been incidentally collected and survived the travel process. However, while there is circumstantial evidence for the tanoak bark importation theory, questions still remain as to how and why the salamanders were able to rapidly colonize the entirety of Vancouver Island and its surrounding islets from only six tanneries clustered on the southeast coast of the main island.

Another theory holds that the wandering salamander's presence on Vancouver Island is the result of natural log-rafting from California on the north-flowing Davidson Current. The Davidson Current is the dominant ocean current along the Pacific coast of North America, and, during winter, flows along the continental shelf from California to the nearshore vicinity of Vancouver Island.

Prior being split from A. ferreus, it was hypothesized that the wandering salamander's disjunct distribution was the result of glaciation, with the species' once continuous population becoming fragmented by glaciers but persisting in refugia in California and Vancouver Island. Vancouver Island is known to have been ice-free during the last glacial maximum, and did serve as a refuge for many species. However, population fragmentation typically leads to genetic divergence over time, which would make the very close genetic similarity of the California and Vancouver populations somewhat surprising given how much time has passed since the last glacial period.

== Habitat ==
The species occurs from sea level to 1,700 metres (5,600 ft). They appear to have very small home ranges, and rarely venture far from their territories.

Adult salamanders can be found in the forest canopy, or moist terrestrial habitats such as rotting logs, bark crevices, stumps, and the underside of rocks. They are more likely to be found within bark on a log than under loose bark on the ground.

Individuals may climb up to 80 ft (24 m) in the branches of trees, and have been found living in the crowns of coast redwoods. Although research on arboreal microhabitat selection in this species has been minimal, they appear to associate with epiphytic fern mats in the crotches of redwood branches.

== Life History ==
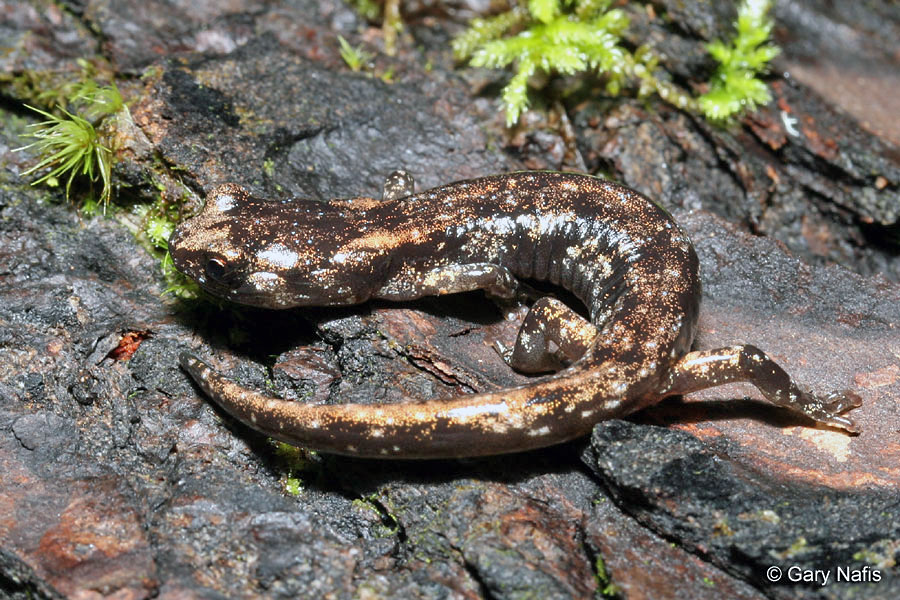
A juvenile Wandering Salamander (Aneides vagrans).

=== Reproduction ===
Breeding takes place in spring and early summer, during which the female lays a clutch of 6-9 eggs in a concealed location. Eggs have been found in terrestrial locations such as under logs, as well as at the base of tree branches 30–40 metres (98–131 ft) above the ground. Adult salamanders have been found guarding eggs as they develop.

The eggs of wandering salamanders hatch directly into adult form, with no aquatic larval stage.

=== Inactivity ===
Like most salamanders, activity patterns in wandering salamanders are determined mostly by moisture. This species is more likely to be active and present at the surface when it is rainy or moisture is high.

On Vancouver Island, the species is most active during spring, summer, and fall, and likely becomes dormant during the cold winter.

In California, this species is generally most active in the rainy winter months and less active during the dry, hot summer.

=== Diet ===
This species is a generalist feeder, consuming small invertebrates such as ants, mites, adult beetles and their larvae, snails, springtails and woodlice. Ants appear to make up the largest proportion of its diet, followed by beetles and springtails.

== Behavior ==
=== Gliding ===
Wandering salamanders may leap from trees when disturbed, and have several adaptations that allow them to manipulate their descent. Wind tunnel experiments have found that wandering salamanders can control their pitch, roll, and yaw when in the air such that their body remains upright and stable in a "skydiving" posture that reduces descent speed. This posture generally involves spread legs and splayed feet, with the tail angled upwards. The large feet and long toes of this species appear to help increase drag when in the air, contributing to reduced speed. The long legs of this species also position the feet far from the body, which may aid in aerial maneuvering. Parasagittal undulations of the tail and torso allow wandering salamanders to glide in a controlled manner similar to arboreal squamates. This enables them to land on the trunk or branch of a tree — often the same tree that they jumped from — instead of falling all the way to the ground.

=== Climbing ===
Wandering salamanders have several toe adaptations that help with climbing. The ends of their square-shaped toes have a large cavity that can be rapidly filled or emptied of blood to change the toe's shape, possibly allowing for better grip and surface adhesion. When filled with fluid, these cavities may also serve as shock-absorbers, softening the salamander's fall after jumping from a tree. Some tree frogs have similar structures devoted to softening landings. Like many other species of arboreal salamanders and squamates, wandering salamanders also have curved toes, though it is unclear whether this toe shape actually improves grip strength. Unlike some other arboreal salamanders however, evidence suggest that wandering salamanders do not rely on mucous secretion to improve surface adhesion.

=== Territoriality ===
Wandering salamanders on Vancouver Island appear to be less territorial compared to other plethodontid species. Lab studies have shown that they will not avoid cover objects that are already being used by individuals of either their own species or different species, with the exception of rough-skinned newts. However, rough-skinned newts secrete toxins from their skin, which may explain avoidance in this case. Aggressive encounters between wandering salamanders are also much less frequent compared to other similar species.

Behaviors that are considered threat displays in other plethodontid salamanders, such as raised bodies, looking at opponents, long bites, and jaw snapping, are either rare or not correlated with aggressive behavior in Vancouver Island wandering salamanders. However, when combat does occur, it is most often between males. Fighting individuals will most often engage in behaviors such as holding one another down, pushing, "circle-pushing", and chasing. Threat posturing in this species involves raising the entire body of the ground while straightening their legs and arching their back and tail.

Territoriality has not been well-studied in California wandering salamander populations.

=== Scent-marking ===
Wandering salamanders often use their nose to investigate their environment, tapping it against the ground, fecal pellets, and the noses of other salamanders. When alert, this species will also raise its head. Sometimes, individuals will rub their nose or underbelly against the ground, which may be a form of scent-marking. However, fecal pellets do not appear to be used for territorial scent-marking, in contrast to many other plethodontid salamanders species.

== Status ==
The wandering salamander is listed as Least Concern in the IUCN Red List of Threatened Species, though populations are declining. Habitat loss due to intensive, short-rotation logging practices and land clearing for agriculture and residential development is believed to be the primary cause of population declines.

In addition to removing trees in which the salamanders may live, over the long term logging also reduces the availability of coarse woody debris on the ground, which the salamanders use as habitat and for egg-laying. It is believed that salamanders may thrive initially after logging, but decline as remaining logs and stumps decay and are not replaced. However, logging in British Columbia does not appear to affect wandering salamander populations, and the species can persist in regenerating forests. The effects of logging are therefore likely dependent on the frequency and intensity of tree removal, as well as the moisture regime of the region. And in arid regions, stumps and woody debris created by logging might not make suitable habitat for wandering salamanders because they are too dry.

Climate change is likely a threat to this species due to drought and habitat shifts in the coastal Douglas-fir biogeoclimatic zone in which the salamanders dwell. The emerging Batrachochytrium salamandrivorans fungus also has the potential to affect wandering salamander populations, though it has not yet been confirmed to be present in North America.
