= Prehensile tail =

Tail of an animal that has adapted to be able to grasp or hold objects

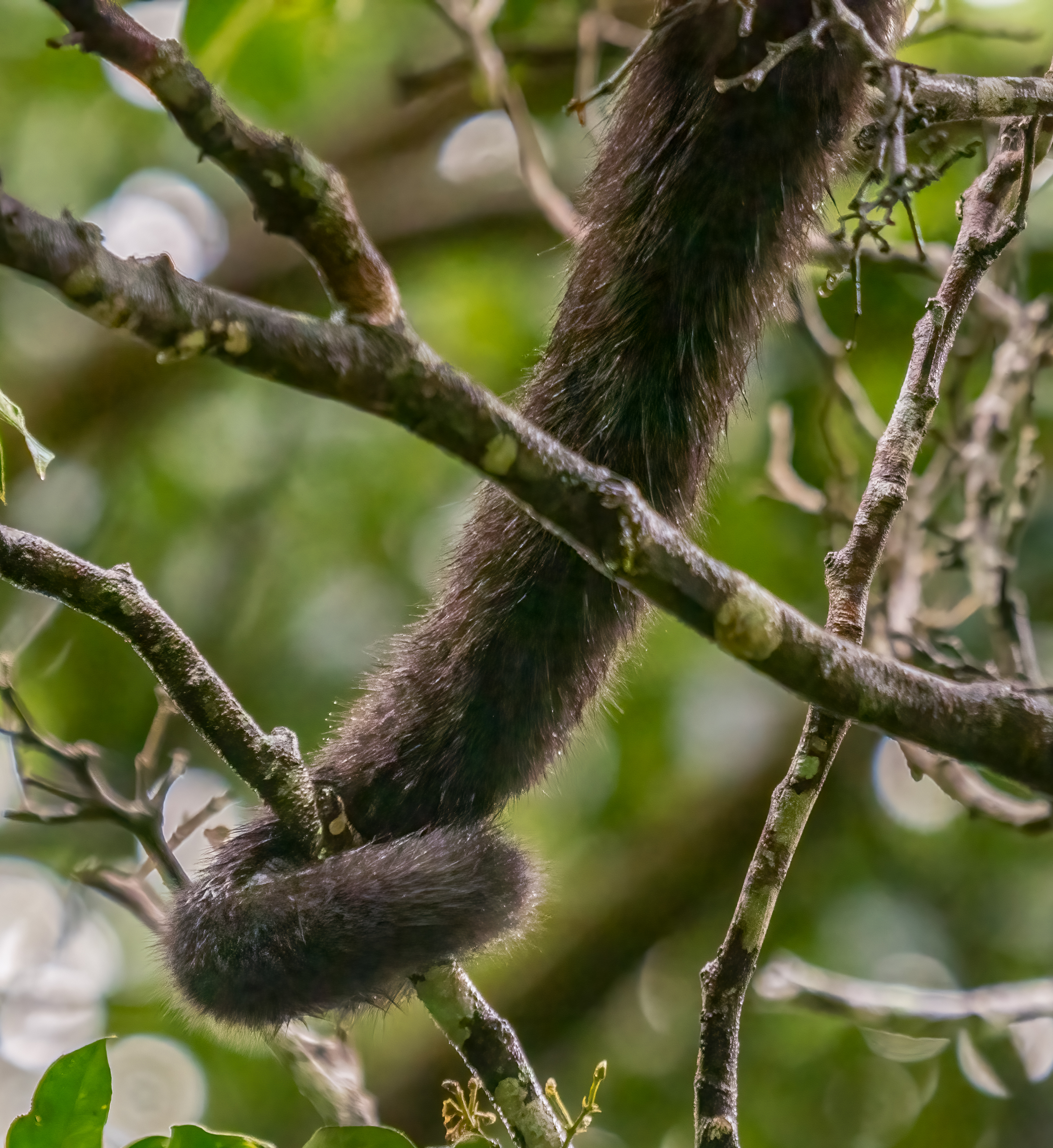
The prehensile tail of a mantled howler monkey

An animal's tail is said to be prehensile if it can grasp or hold objects. Fully prehensile tails can be used to hold and manipulate objects, and in particular to aid arboreal creatures in finding and eating food in the trees. If the tail cannot be used for this it is considered only partially prehensile; such tails are often used to anchor an animal's body to dangle from a branch, or as an aid for climbing. The term prehensile means "able to grasp" (from the Latin prehendere, to take hold of, to grasp).

== Evolution ==
One point of interest is the distribution of animals with prehensile tails. The prehensile tail is predominantly a New World adaptation, especially among mammals. Many more animals in South America have prehensile tails than in Africa and Southeast Asia. It has been argued that animals with prehensile tails are more common in South America because the forest there is denser than in Africa or Southeast Asia. In contrast, less dense forests such as in Southeast Asia have been observed to have more abundant gliding animals such as colugos or flying snakes; few gliding vertebrates are found in South America. South American rainforests also differ by having more lianas, as there are fewer large animals to eat them than in Africa and Asia; the presence of lianas may aid climbers but obstruct gliders. Australia-New Guinea contains many mammals with prehensile tails and also many mammals which can glide; in fact, all Australian mammalian gliders have tails that are prehensile to an extent.

== Anatomy and physiology ==
Tails are mostly a feature of vertebrates; however, some invertebrates such as scorpions also have appendages that can be considered tails. However, only vertebrates are known to have developed prehensile tails. Many mammals with prehensile tails will have a bare patch to aid gripping. This bare patch is known as a "friction pad".

== Animals with fully prehensile tails ==
=== Fish ===
- Seahorses. Seahorses have fully prehensile tails, which they use to attach themselves to objects such as seagrass, algae, sponges, corals, or even man-made objects.

=== Mammals ===
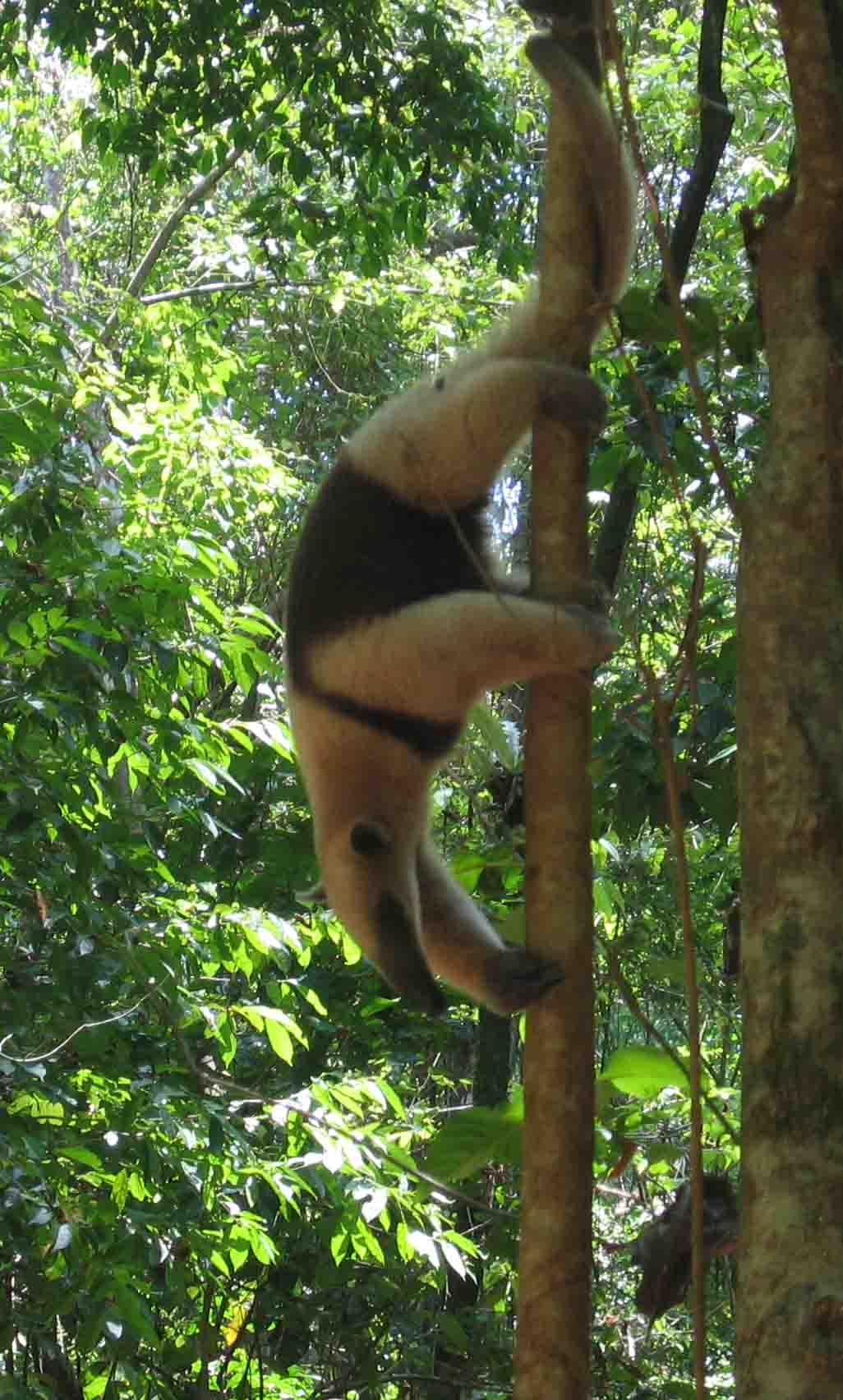
A northern tamandua (Tamandua mexicana) making use of its prehensile tail

- Binturong. One of the few Old World animals with fully prehensile tails, although they use only the tip of the tail.
- Harvest mouse. Another Old World mammal, the harvest mouse (Micromys minutus) also has a fully prehensile tail. It is commonly found amongst areas of tall grasses such as cereal crops (particularly wheat and oats), roadside verges, hedgerows, reedbeds, dykes and salt-marshes.
- Tree pangolin. One of the few Old World mammals with a fully prehensile tail.
- Microgale longicaudata, an arboreal species of the tenrec family.
- Platypus. The semi-aquatic monotreme found in Australia. Much the same as Opossums, Platypuses gather leaves to line their nests, using their tails to carry the materials they've collected.
- New World monkeys. Many New World monkeys in the family Atelidae, which includes howler monkeys, spider monkeys and woolly monkeys, have grasping tails often with a bare tactile pad. This is in contrast with their distant Old World monkey cousins who do not have prehensile tails.
- New World porcupines of the genera Coendou and Chaetomys have fully prehensile tails that help them to climb and prevent them from falling from trees.
- Opossum. A marsupial group from the New World. Native to the Americas, the tail is occasionally used as a grip to carry bunches of leaves or bedding materials to the nest.
- Anteaters. Anteaters are found in Central and South America. Nine of the ten species of anteater, the seven species of silky anteater and the two species of tamandua, have prehensile tails.
- Kinkajou. The kinkajou of South and Central America is the only other animal of the order Carnivora, besides the binturong, to sport the adaptation.

== Animals with partially prehensile tails ==
=== Mammals ===
- New World monkeys. The capuchin monkey. The capuchin is more than intelligent enough to make full use of its prehensile tail, but since the tail lacks an area of bare skin for a good grip it is only used in climbing and dangling. Other reasons for partial prehensility might include the lack of strength or flexibility in the tail, or simply having no need to manipulate objects with it.
- Tree porcupines. The 15 species of tree porcupine (genus Coendou). They are found in South America, with one species extending to Mexico. All have prehensile tails.
- Rats have been known to be able to wrap the tail around an object after running around it, therefore giving the creature a small bit of balance. They have also been seen to be able to briefly hang off an object, though not for long.
- Possums. This large, diverse group of 63 species forms the marsupial suborder Phalangeriformes, found in Australia, New Guinea, and some nearby islands. All members of the suborder have prehensile tails; however, the tails of some members such as the Acrobatidae have only limited prehensile capacity. Notably, all three marsupial glider groups belong to this suborder.
- Potoroidae. A marsupial group found in Australia that includes the bettongs and the potoroos. They have weakly prehensile tails.
- Monito del monte. A small South American marsupial with a prehensile tail.

=== Reptiles ===
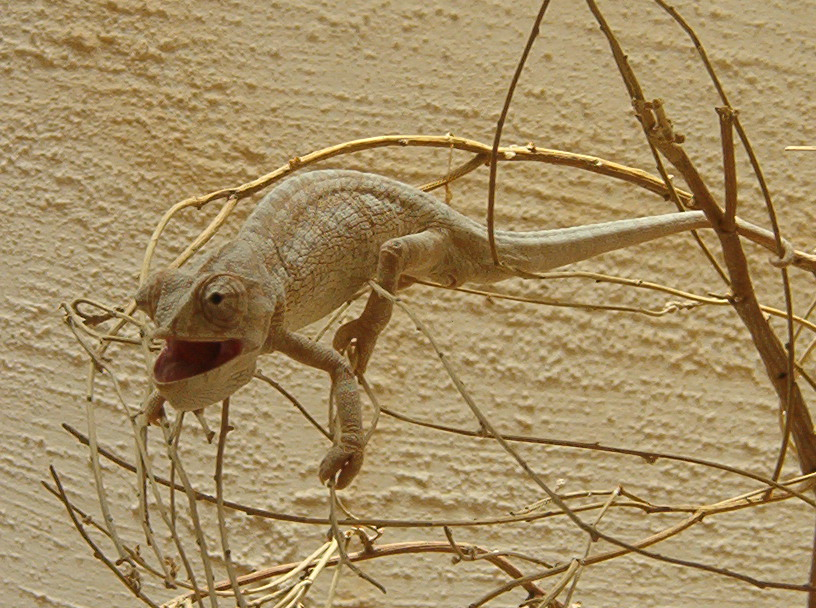
Mediterranean chameleon using its prehensile tail

- Prehensile-tailed skink. Several kinds of skink (e.g. Corucia zebrata) have partially prehensile tails.
- Chameleons.
- Snakes. Many snakes have partially prehensile tails (or partially prehensile body)
- Crested gecko and their relatives have prehensile tails
- Alligator lizard. Some alligator lizards such as the southern alligator lizard, the Texas alligator lizard, and the arboreal alligator lizards (genus Abronia) have prehensile tails.
- Big-headed turtle, and juvenile specimens of the family Chelydridae.
- Urocoyledon rasmusseni

=== Amphibians ===
- Salamanders. A number of North American forest-dwelling climbing salamanders have prehensile tails that help them climb. Some are from the genus Aneides such as the clouded salamander (Aneides ferreus), the wandering salamander (Aneides vagrans), and the arboreal salamander (Aneides lugubris). Others are the large Red Hills salamander (Phaeognathus hubrichti) and the cave salamander (Eurycea lucifuga). There are also the Central American Bolitoglossa sombra and Mexican and Central American Bolitoglossa mexicana salamanders.

=== Fish ===
- Syngnathidae. Many species from this group, which includes seahorses and pipefish, have prehensile tails.
