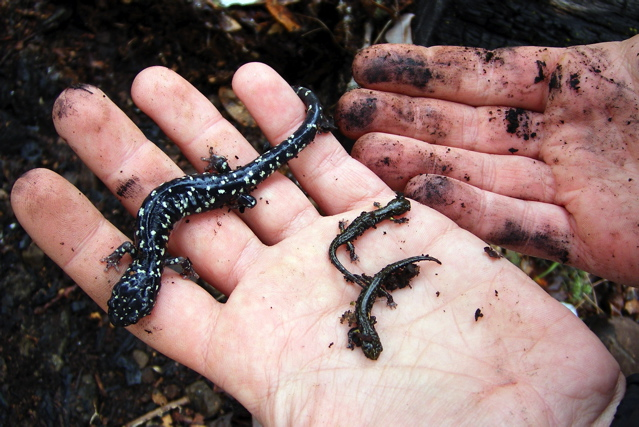
- Speckled black salamander mother and young

Conservation status
- Least Concern (IUCN 3.1)

Scientific classification
- Kingdom: Animalia
- Phylum: Chordata
- Class: Amphibia
- Order: Urodela
- Family: Plethodontidae
- Genus: Aneides
- Species: A. flavipunctatus

Binomial name
- Aneides flavipunctatus (Strauch, 1870)

Synonyms
- Plethodon flavipunctatus Strauch, 1870

= Speckled black salamander =

Species of amphibian

The speckled black salamander (Aneides flavipunctatus), previously known as just the black salamander, is a species of salamander in the family Plethodontidae. It is endemic to the U.S. state of California. Its natural habitats are temperate forests and temperate grassland. It is threatened by habitat loss.

== Taxonomy ==
Previously, it was referred to as the black salamander, and was thought to have a fragmented range across most of California and southern Oregon. However, a 2019 taxonomic study found it to represent a species complex of multiple species: the speckled black salamander (A. flavipunctatus sensu stricto), the Shasta black salamander (A. iecanus), the Santa Cruz black salamander (A. niger), and the Klamath black salamander (A. klamathensis). These were thus split off as distinct species.

== Description ==
The speckled black salamander can grow to 60 to 75 millimeters (2.4 to 3.0 in) long. The color varies, black with coarse can be the color or fine white spots, black with yellow spots, or black with a grayish or greenish sheen. The underside is paler. Juveniles are greenish-gray or bronze and have yellow at the base of their legs.

== Distribution and habitat ==
The speckled black salamander is found in forested areas and grassland in the coastal ranges of California, mostly at elevations below 600 meters (2,000 ft) but occasionally up to 1,700 meters (5,600 ft). It ranges from southern Humboldt and Trinity counties south to southwestern Sonoma and northern Napa counties. An Aneides population in Glenn County may be of this species but this is debated. In the southern part of its range it hides under logs and rocks in damp places and stream banks in woodland. Northern populations are found in more open country and in the far north of its range it is found among mossy rocks and scree.

== Biology ==
The speckled black salamander is mostly terrestrial but has a prehensile tail so may sometimes climb as does the related arboreal salamander Aneides lugubris. It feeds on small invertebrates such as millipedes, beetles, ants and termites. Juveniles have a similar diet but include flies and springtails. Like other plethodont salamanders, it is mainly nocturnal and hides during the day.

The breeding habits of the speckled black salamander have been little studied. The eggs are laid in July or August in underground chambers, where they are attached by short stalks to the moist soil. The female seems to guard the eggs until they hatch. In captivity, the black salamander is aggressive towards its own species and adults in the wild are often scarred, so the species is probably territorial. In the laboratory it has been known to bite the western garter snake when attacked.

== Status ==
The speckled black salamander is listed as least concern in the IUCN Red List of Threatened Species. In some areas it has been displaced by the planting of vineyards. In addition, this listing is based on the previous definition of the species (prior to other species being split off), when it was thought to have a wider range.
