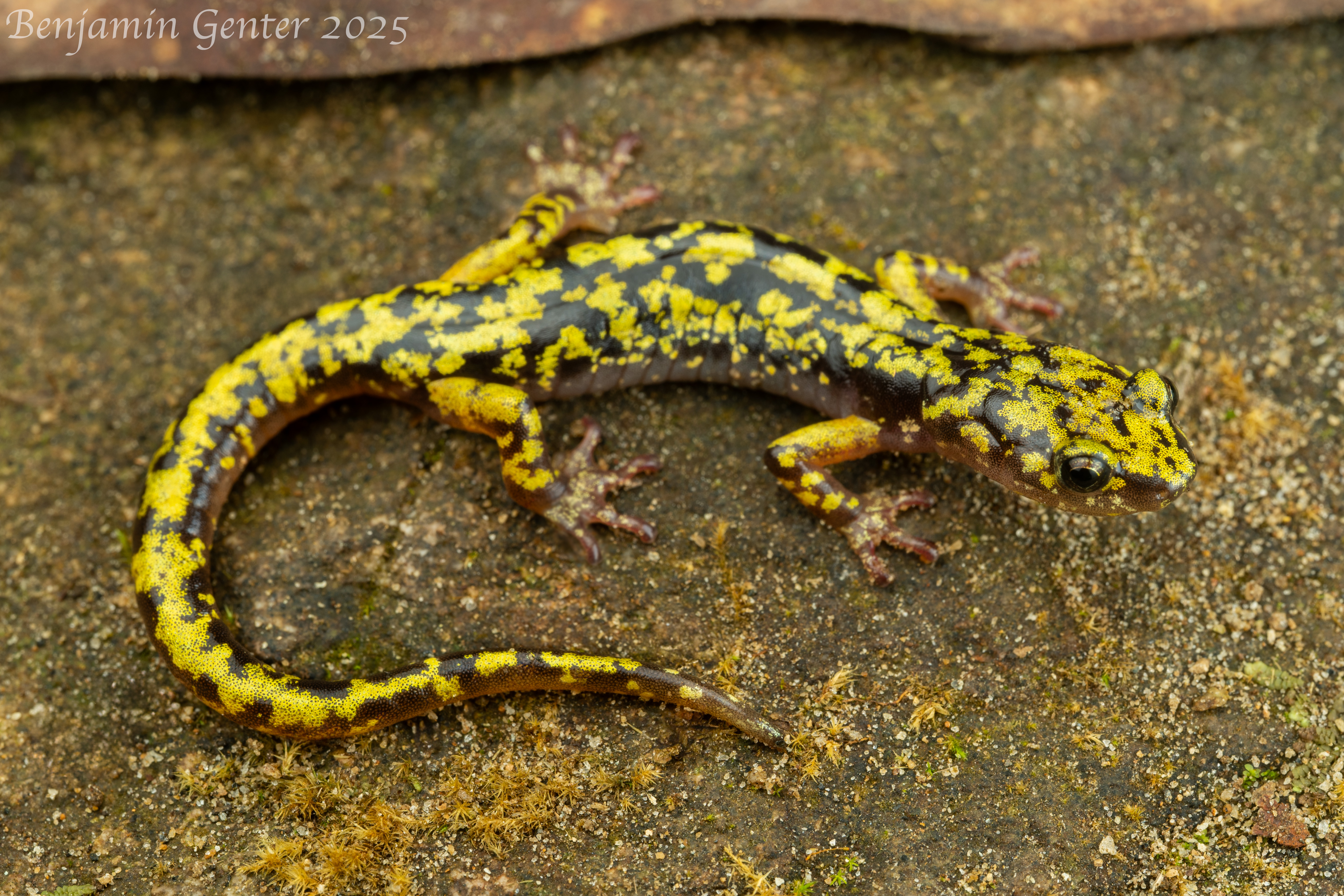
- Adult from North Carolina

Conservation status
- Critically Endangered (IUCN 3.1)

Scientific classification
- Kingdom: Animalia
- Phylum: Chordata
- Class: Amphibia
- Order: Urodela
- Family: Plethodontidae
- Genus: Aneides
- Subgenus: Castaneides
- Species: A. caryaensis

Binomial name
- Aneides caryaensis Patton, Apodaca, Corser, Wilson, Williams, Cameron and Wake, 2019

= Hickory Nut Gorge green salamander =

Species of amphibian

The Hickory Nut Gorge green salamander (Aneides caryaensis) is a species of lungless salamander in the family Plethodontidae. It is endemic to the Hickory Nut Gorge in the state of North Carolina in the United States.

== Taxonomy ==
It is a member of the subgenus Castaneides, which contains the only members of the genus Aneides that inhabit the eastern half of North America, including the green salamander (Aneides aeneus) and two undescribed taxa. It was formerly considered a population of the green salamander until a study in 2019 found it to represent a distinct species and described it as such. Based on genetic evidence, it is the most basal member of the subgenus Castaneides, and forms a clade entirely distinct from the other three likely species in the subgenus.

A distinct population of A. aeneus of the Blue Ridge Escarpment (possibly another Castaneides cryptic species) can be found just 25 km west of A. caryaensis's range in the Hickory Nut Gorge, but both taxa are genetically distinct, indicating a lack of gene flow between either species. Although no obvious surface barrier separates either species, three Mesozoic-aged faults lie in the gap between the species distribution; activity in these fault regions during the Miocene likely altered the surrounding habitat into a more grassland-dominated area unsuitable for Aneides species, isolating them in relict forest habitats such as those that existed in the Hickory Nut Gorge. Around the same time, another relict forest may have existed in the Cumberland Plateau that also hosted an Aneides taxon; the descendants of this Cumberland taxon may have recolonized the Appalachian Mountains (as opposed to the ancestor of A. caryaensis, which stayed in its relict habitat in Hickory Nut Gorge) after the forest grew back, and may represent all the other species in the genus Castaneides; this may be why A. caryaensis is so basal to all other species in the subgenus. Prior to the habitat changes in the Miocene, Castaneides species may have reached as far east as the Piedmont, inhabiting lowland habitats and having a more arboreal lifestyle.

== Distribution ==
This species is restricted to the Hickory Nut Gorge, a 20,000-acre, 14-mile long canyon in the Blue Ridge Mountains of North Carolina. Due to this comparatively very small distribution, it is considered a microendemic species. As with A. aeneus, it inhabits crevices & hollows of rock outcrops and woody & arboreal habitats within cove forests, although it primarily depends on the former. Most nesting sites are on rock faces, likely leading to patchily distributed breeding populations.

== Description ==
Aside from genetic differences, it can be physically distinguished from A. aeneus by a tail length (TL) that is longer than its snout to vent length (SVL), as well as its smaller and less-connected lichen-like patches of bright to yellowish-green pigment on a dark body, as opposed to the larger and more-connected patches of green on A. aeneus.

== Status ==
A. caryaensis has an extremely narrow range and, despite intensive searches, is known from only 25 localities. Most of these populations have very low population densities with only a few individuals reported for each locality, and genetic analyses indicate low genetic diversity in these populations, indicating a high level of inbreeding. The estimated population is only 250 individuals, although this may be an underestimate. The top threat to the species is habitat loss and fragmentation from tourism, real estate development, and the construction of transportation and energy infrastructure in the Hickory Nut Gorge. Due to the species being spread patchily across the landscape, habitat fragmentation and loss can easily occur. For these purposes, the species is considered critically imperiled by NatureServe. Necessary protection actions include protecting areas of known and potential habitat from development and maintaining habitat connectivity to facilitate dispersal. The Center for Biological Diversity petitioned the U.S. Fish and Wildlife Service to protect the salamander under the Endangered Species Act in June 2022.
