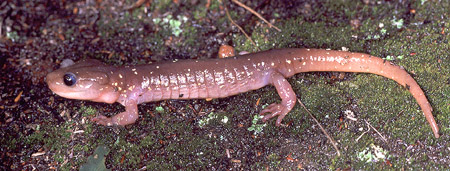
- Aneides lugubris

Scientific classification
- Kingdom: Animalia
- Phylum: Chordata
- Class: Amphibia
- Order: Urodela
- Family: Plethodontidae
- Subfamily: Plethodontinae
- Genus: Aneides; Baird, 1851

Subgenera
- Aneides Baird, 1851; Castaneides Patton et al., 2019

Synonyms
- Anaides Baird, 1851; Autodax Boulenger, 1887

= Climbing salamander =

Climbing salamanders

Genus of salamanders

Climbing salamanders is the common name for plethodontid (lungless) salamanders of the genus Aneides. It contains 10 species native to North America, distributed between the Pacific Coast (7 species), Sacramento Mountains (1 species), and Appalachian Mountains (2 species). As their common name suggests, most of these species have prehensile tails and are quite mobile in trees.

== Taxonomy ==
The green salamander (A. aeneus) and the Hickory Nut Gorge green salamander (A. caryaensis) are now considered to belong to their own subgenus Castaneides, which diverged from the Aneides hardii lineage between 27.2 and 32.3 million years ago, during the Oligocene. Castaneides contains significant cryptic diversity and may contain more as-of-yet undescribed species. All other western Aneides including A. hardii are considered Aneides sensu stricto, and belong to the subgenus of the same name.

== Distribution ==
All ten known species in this genus inhabit mountain ecosystems in North America, and all but three are found primarily in the mountains of the west coast of the United States, Baja California and British Columbia. Of the three non-western species, the Sacramento Mountain salamander (A. hardii) is endemic to a mountainous region in New Mexico, while the two currently-described Castaneides species are endemic to the Appalachian Mountains of eastern United States.

== Species ==
Ten species in two subgenera are currently assigned to this genus:

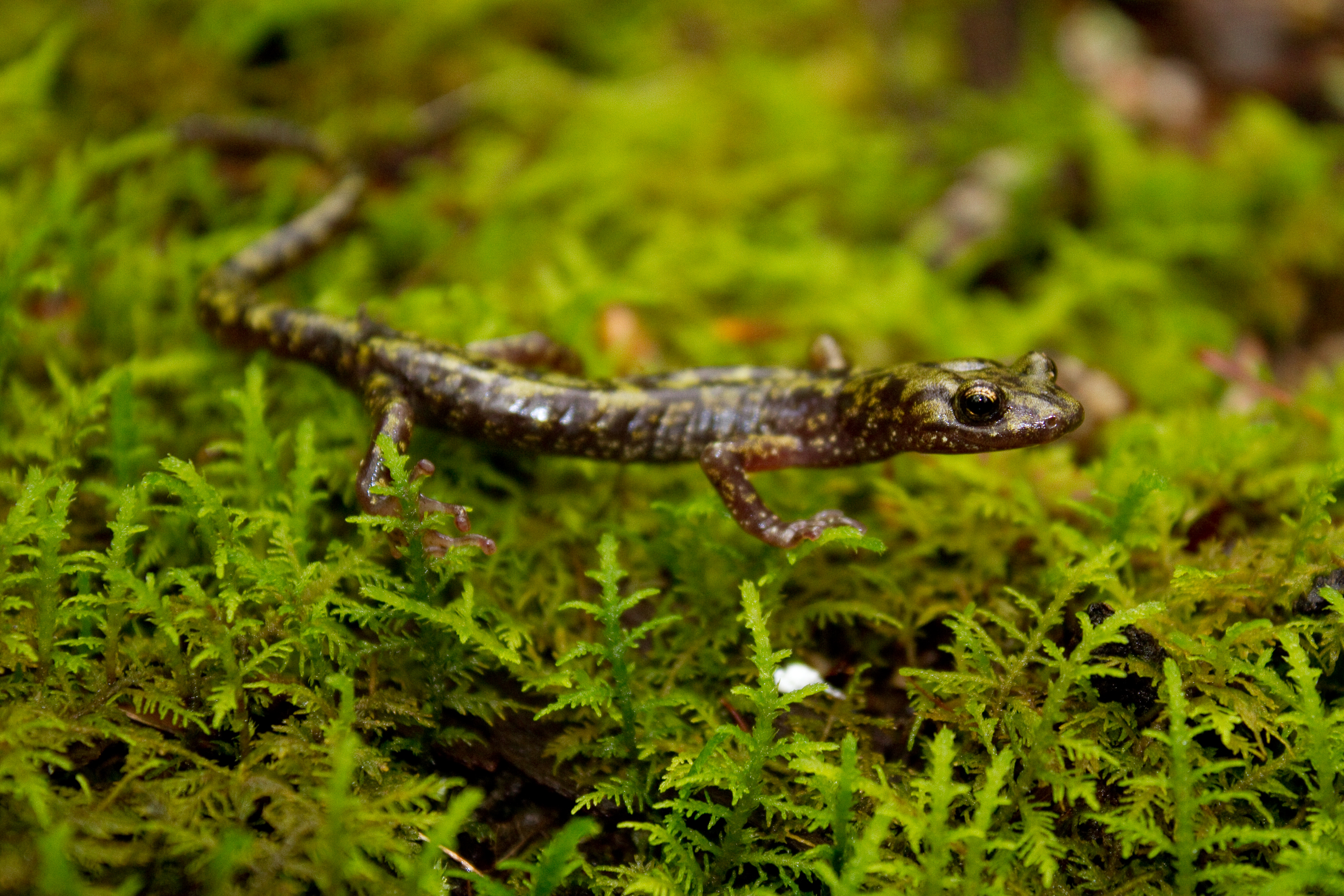
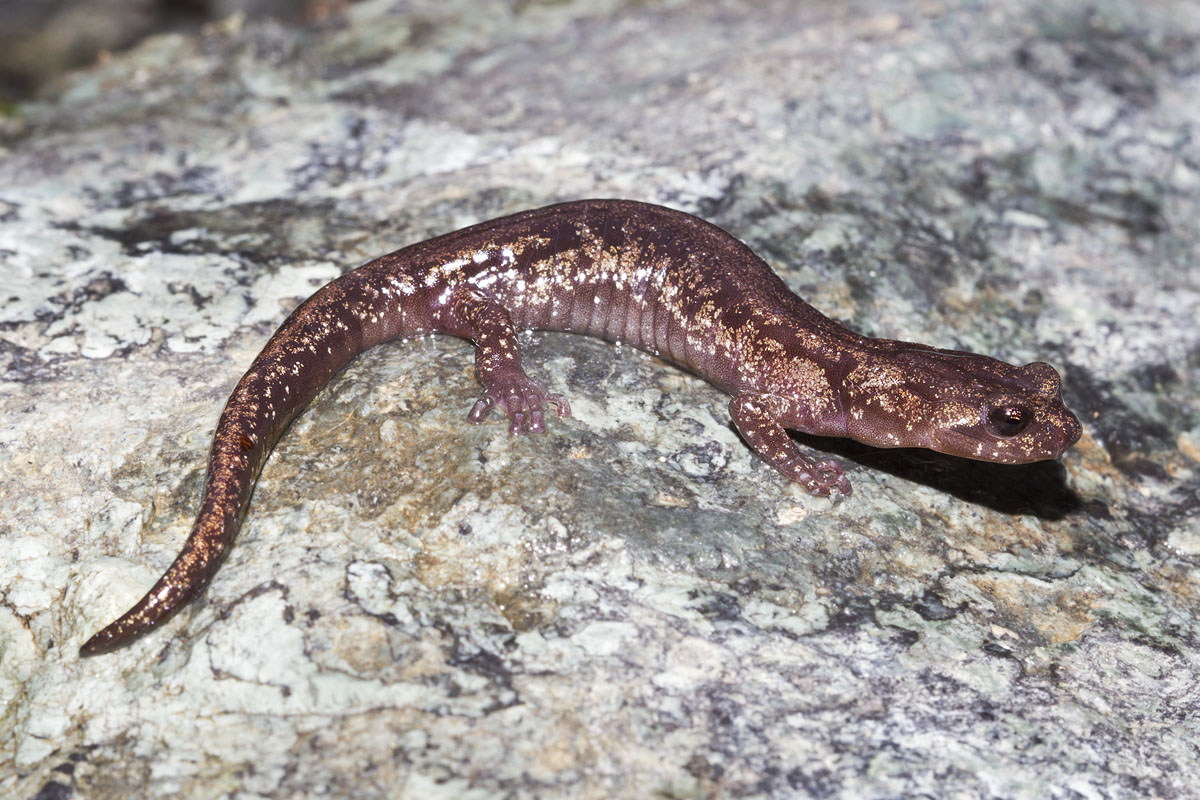
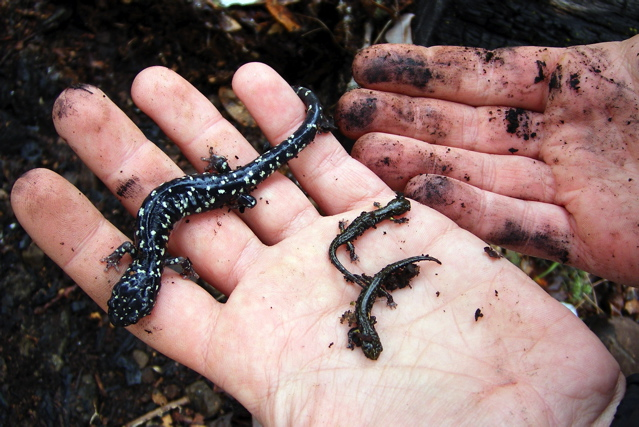
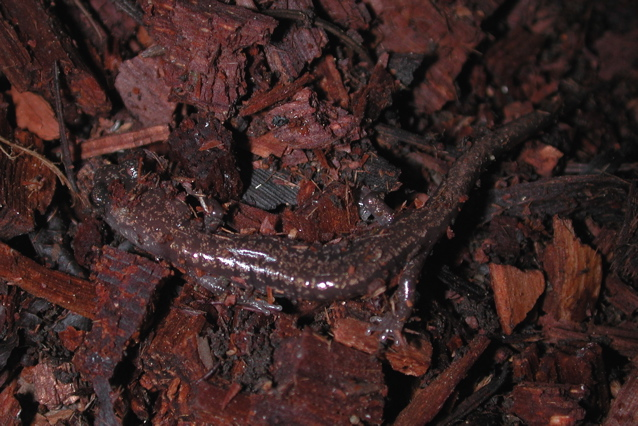
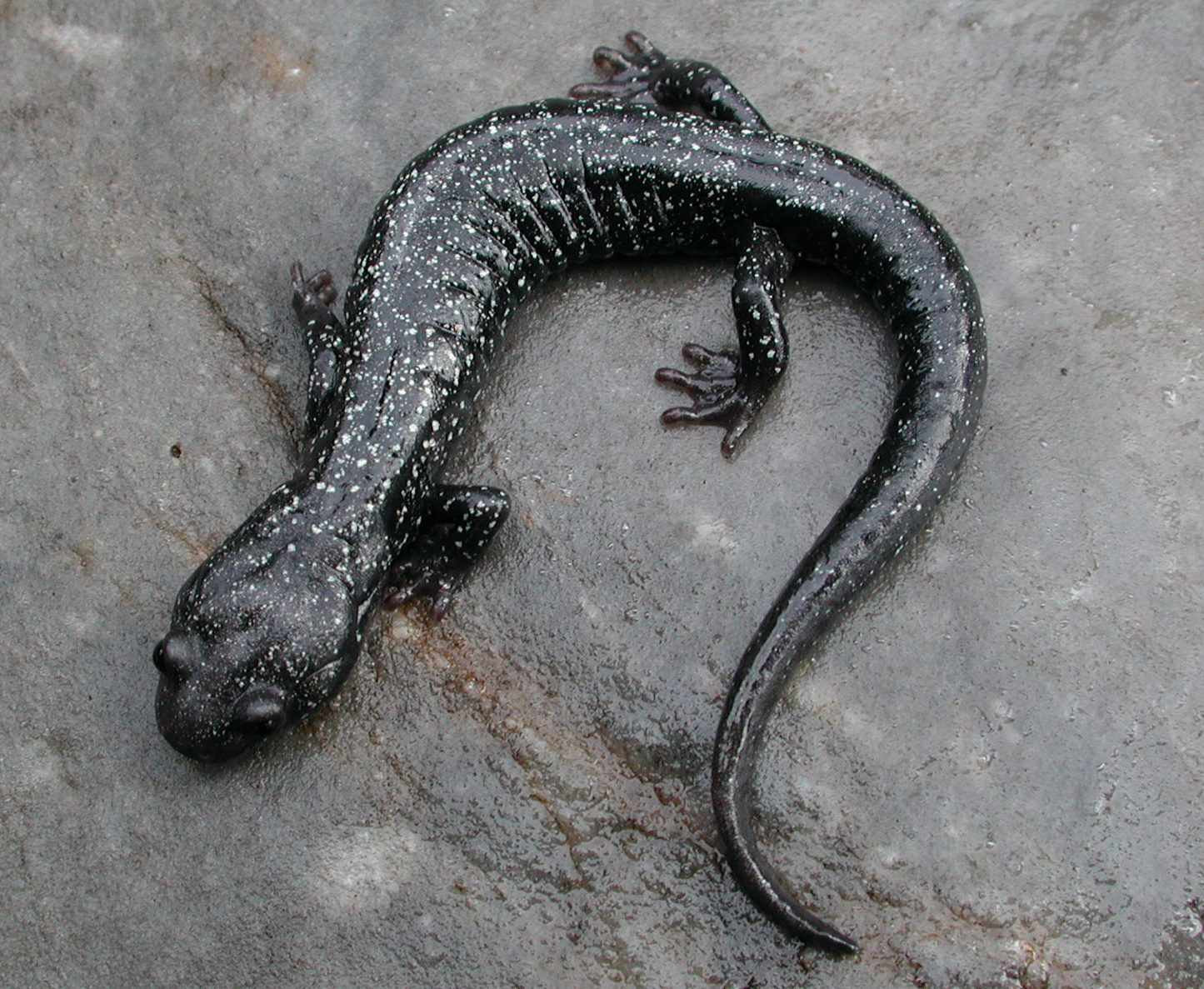
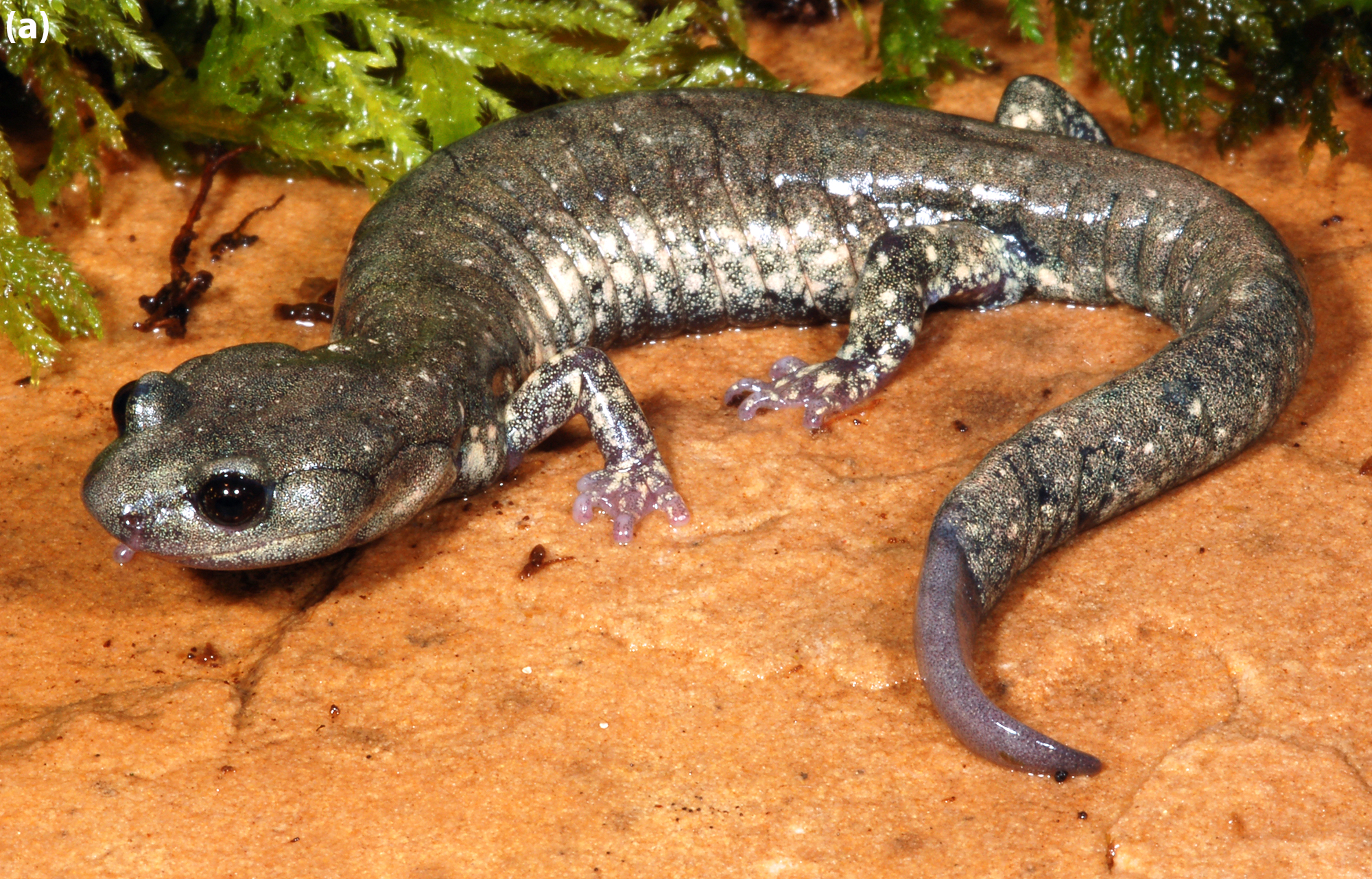
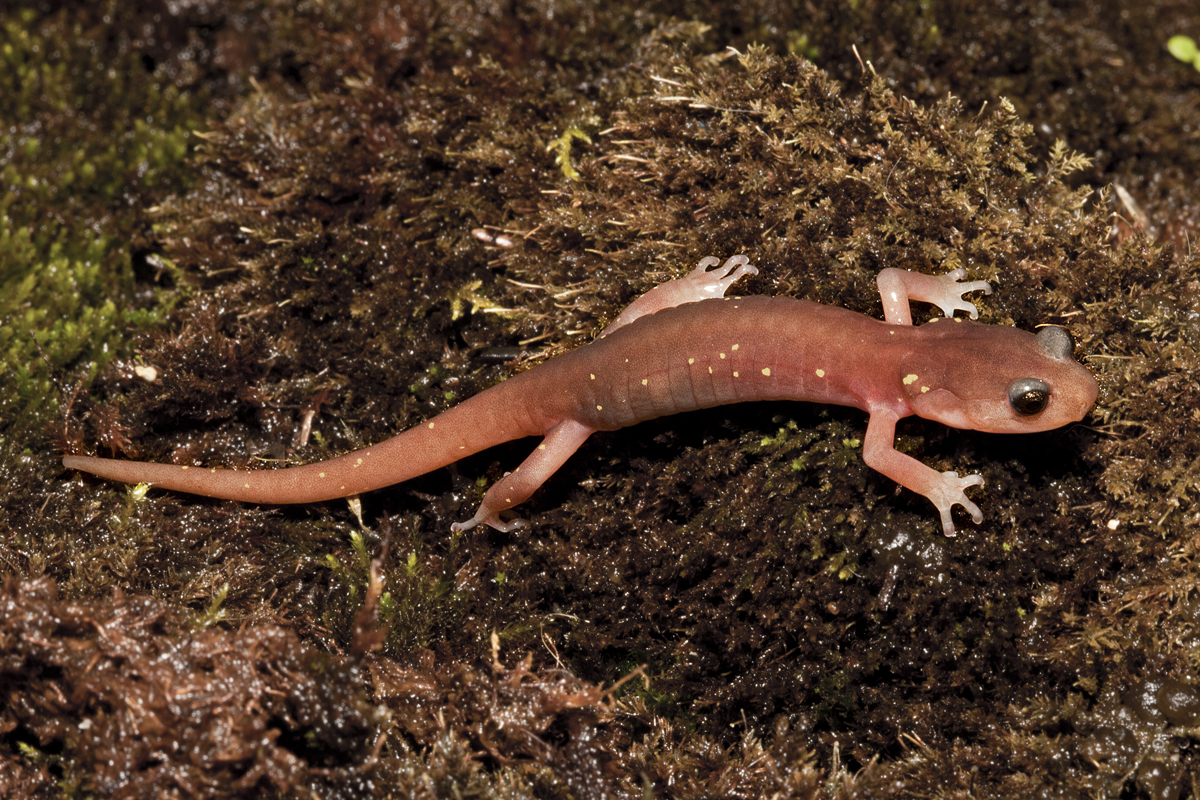
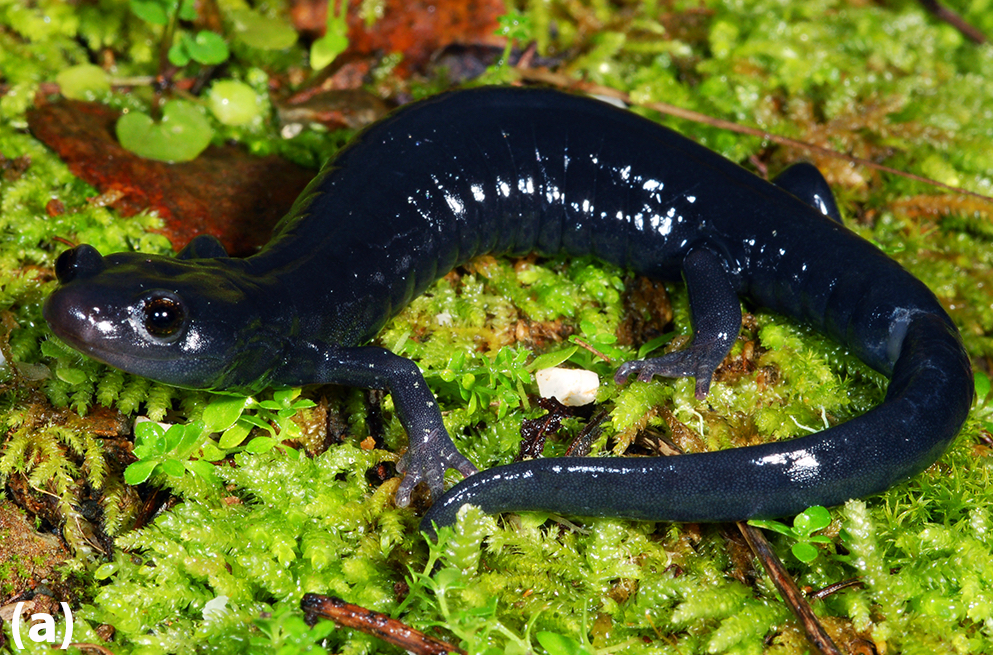
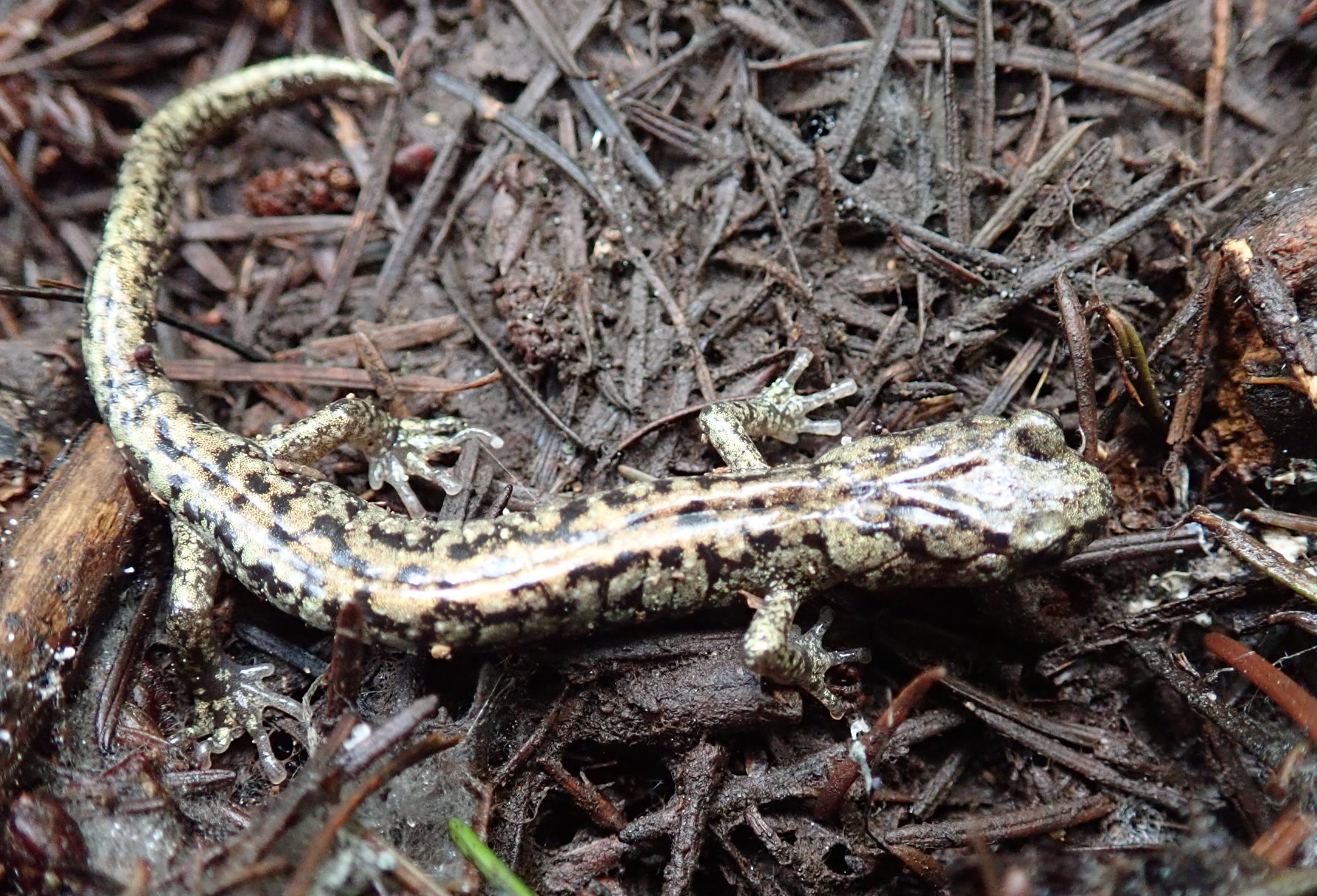
Subgenus	Image	Binomial Name and Author	Common name	Distribution	IUCN status
Castaneides (Patton et al., 2019)		Aneides aeneus (Cope & Packard, 1881)	Green salamander	Eastern United States (Appalachian Mountains, southwest Pennsylvania to northeast Mississippi)	Near Threatened
Castaneides (Patton et al., 2019)		Aneides caryaensis Patton et al., 2019	Hickory Nut Gorge green salamander	Hickory Nut Gorge area of southwest North Carolina	Critically Endangered
Aneides (Baird, 1851)
Aneides (Baird, 1851)		Aneides ferreus Cope, 1869	Clouded salamander	Pacific Coast of the United States (northernmost California to southernmost Washington)	Least Concern
Aneides (Baird, 1851)		Aneides flavipunctatus (Strauch, 1870)	Speckled black salamander	Pacific Coast of northern California	Least Concern
Aneides (Baird, 1851)		Aneides hardii (Taylor, 1941)	Sacramento Mountain salamander	Sacramento Mountains of south-central New Mexico	Near Threatened
Aneides (Baird, 1851)		Aneides iecanus (Cope, 1883)	Shasta black salamander	Shasta Mountains of northern California	Endangered
Aneides (Baird, 1851)		Aneides klamathensis Reilly & Wake, 2019	Klamath black salamander	Pacific Coast of the United States (northern California and southernmost Oregon)	Least Concern
Aneides (Baird, 1851)		Aneides lugubris (Hallowell, 1849)	Arboreal salamander	Southern Pacific Coast of North America (California to northernmost Baja California)	Least Concern
Aneides (Baird, 1851)		Aneides niger Myers & Maslin, 1948	Santa Cruz black salamander	Santa Cruz Mountains of California	Endangered
Aneides (Baird, 1851)		Aneides vagrans Wake & Jackman, 1999	Wandering salamander	Pacific Coast of North America (northern California and Vancouver Island)	Least Concern

Nota bene: A binomial authority in parentheses indicates that the species was originally described in a genus other than Aneides.
