= Arboreal locomotion =

Movement of animals through trees

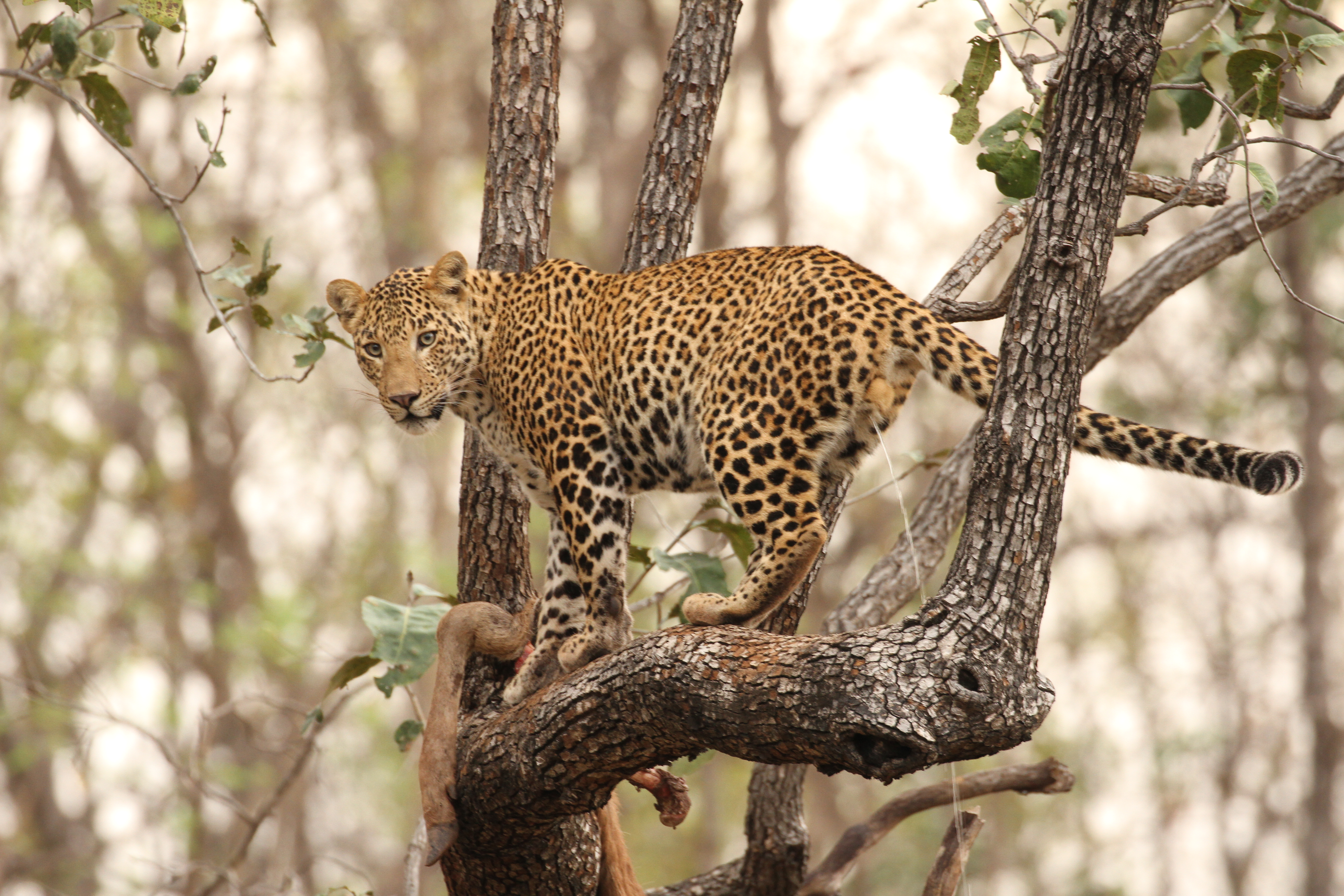
Leopards are great climbers and can carry their kills up trees to keep them out of reach of scavengers and other predators

Arboreal locomotion is the locomotion of animals in trees. In habitats in which trees are present, animals have evolved to move in them. Some animals may scale trees only occasionally (scansorial), but others are exclusively arboreal. The habitats pose numerous mechanical challenges to animals moving through them and lead to a variety of anatomical, behavioral and ecological consequences as well as variations throughout different species. Furthermore, many of these same principles may be applied to climbing without trees, such as on rock piles or mountains.

Some animals are exclusively arboreal in habitat, such as tree snails.

== Biomechanics ==
Arboreal habitats pose numerous mechanical challenges to animals moving in them, which have been solved in diverse ways. These challenges include moving on narrow branches, moving up and down inclines, balancing, crossing gaps, and dealing with obstructions.

=== Diameter ===
Moving along narrow surfaces, such as a branch of a tree, can create special difficulties for animals who are not adapted to deal with balancing on small diameter substrates. During locomotion on the ground, the location of the center of mass may swing from side to side. But during arboreal locomotion, this would result in the center of mass moving beyond the edge of the branch, resulting in a tendency to topple over and fall. Not only do some arboreal animals have to be able to move on branches of varying diameter, but they also have to eat on these branches, resulting in the need for the ability to balance while using their hands to feed themselves. This resulted in various types of grasping such as pedal grasping in order to clamp themselves onto small branches for better balance.

=== Incline ===
Branches are frequently oriented at an angle to gravity in arboreal habitats, including being vertical, which poses special problems. As an animal moves up an inclined branch, it must fight the force of gravity to raise its body, making the movement more difficult. To get past this difficulty, many animals have to grasp the substrate with all four limbs and increase the frequency of their gait sequence. Conversely, as the animal descends, it must also fight gravity to control its descent and prevent falling. Descent can be particularly problematic for many animals, and highly arboreal species often have specialized methods for controlling their descent. One way animals prevent falling while descending is to increase the amount of contact their limbs are making with the substrate to increase friction and braking power.

=== Balance ===
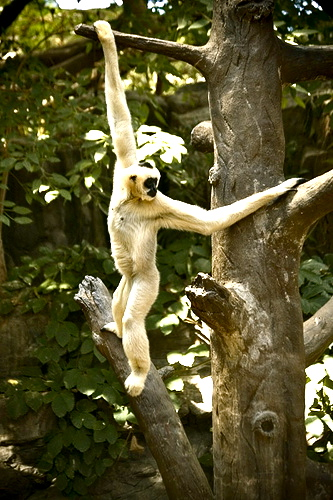
Gibbons are very good brachiators because their elongated arms enable them to easily swing and grasp on to branches

Due to the height of many branches and the potentially disastrous consequences of a fall, balance is of primary importance to arboreal animals. On horizontal and gently sloped branches, the primary problem is tipping to the side due to the narrow base of support. The narrower the branch, the greater the difficulty in balancing a given animal faces. On steep and vertical branches, tipping becomes less of an issue, and pitching backwards or slipping downwards becomes the most likely failure. In this case, large-diameter branches pose a greater challenge since the animal cannot place its forelimbs closer to the center of the branch than its hindlimbs.

=== Crossing gaps ===
Some arboreal animals need to be able to move from tree to tree in order to find food and shelter. To be able to get from tree to tree, animals have evolved various adaptations. In some areas trees are close together and can be crossed by simple brachiation. In other areas, trees are not close together and animals need to have specific adaptations to jump far distances or glide.

=== Obstructions ===
Arboreal habitats often contain many obstructions, both in the form of branches emerging from the one being moved on and other branches impinging on the space the animal needs to move through. These obstructions may impede locomotion, or may be used as additional contact points to enhance it. While obstructions tend to impede limbed animals, they benefit snakes by providing anchor points.

== Anatomical specializations ==
Arboreal organisms display many specializations for dealing with the mechanical challenges of moving through their habitats.

Arboreal animals frequently have elongated limbs that help them cross gaps, reach fruit or other resources, test the firmness of support ahead, and in some cases, to brachiate. However, some species of lizard have reduced limb size that helps them avoid limb movement being obstructed by impinging branches.

Many arboreal species, such as howler monkeys, green tree pythons, emerald tree boas, chameleons, silky anteaters, spider monkeys, and possums, use prehensile tails to grasp branches. In the spider monkey and crested gecko, the tip of the tail has either a bare patch or adhesive pad, which provides increased friction.

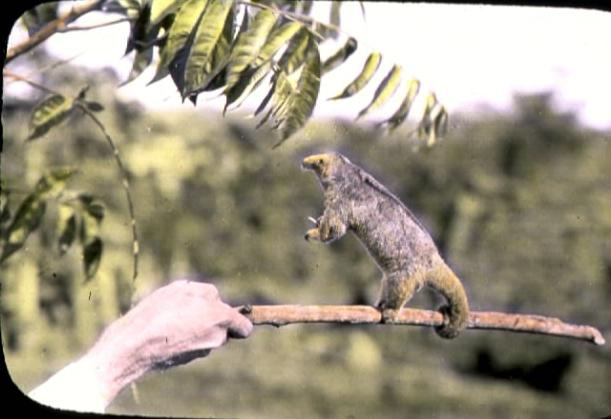
The silky anteater uses its prehensile tail as a third arm for stabilization and balance, while its claws help better grasp and climb onto branches

Various organisms use claws to negotiate rough surfaces such as rockfaces or corky substrates and re-orient the direction of the force the animal applies. This allows lizards such as Agamas and Cordylidae to inhabit cliffs, and squirrels to climb tree trunks that are so large as to be essentially flat. However, claws can interfere with an animal's ability to grasp very small branches, as they may wrap too far around and prick the animal's own paw.

Adhesion is an alternative to claws, which works best on smooth surfaces. Wet adhesion is common in tree frogs and arboreal salamanders, and functions either by suction or by capillary adhesion. Dry adhesion is best typified by the specialized toes of geckos, which use van der Waals forces to adhere to many substrates, even glass. In some species of geckoes, such as in the genus Lygodactylus, the reliance on van der Waals forces is supplemented by a patch of specialised scales under the tip of the tail; a tail regenerated after defensive autotomy however, lacks that adhesive tip.

Frictional gripping is used by primates, relying upon hairless fingertips. Squeezing the branch between the fingertips generates a frictional force that holds the animal's hand to the branch. However, this type of grip depends upon the angle of the frictional force; thus upon the diameter of the branch, with larger branches resulting in reduced gripping ability. Animals other than primates that use gripping in climbing include the chameleon, which has mitten-like grasping feet, and many birds that grip branches in perching or moving about.

To control descent, especially down large diameter branches, some arboreal animals such as squirrels have evolved highly mobile ankle joints that permit rotating the foot into a 'reversed' posture. This allows the claws to hook into the rough surface of the bark, opposing the force of gravity.

Many arboreal species lower their center of mass to reduce pitching and toppling movement when climbing. This may be accomplished by postural changes, altered body proportions, or smaller size.

Small size provides many advantages to arboreal species: such as increasing the relative size of branches to the animal, lower center of mass, increased stability, lower mass (allowing movement on smaller branches), and the ability to move through more cluttered habitat. Size relating to weight affects gliding animals such as the reduced weight per snout-vent length for "flying" frogs.

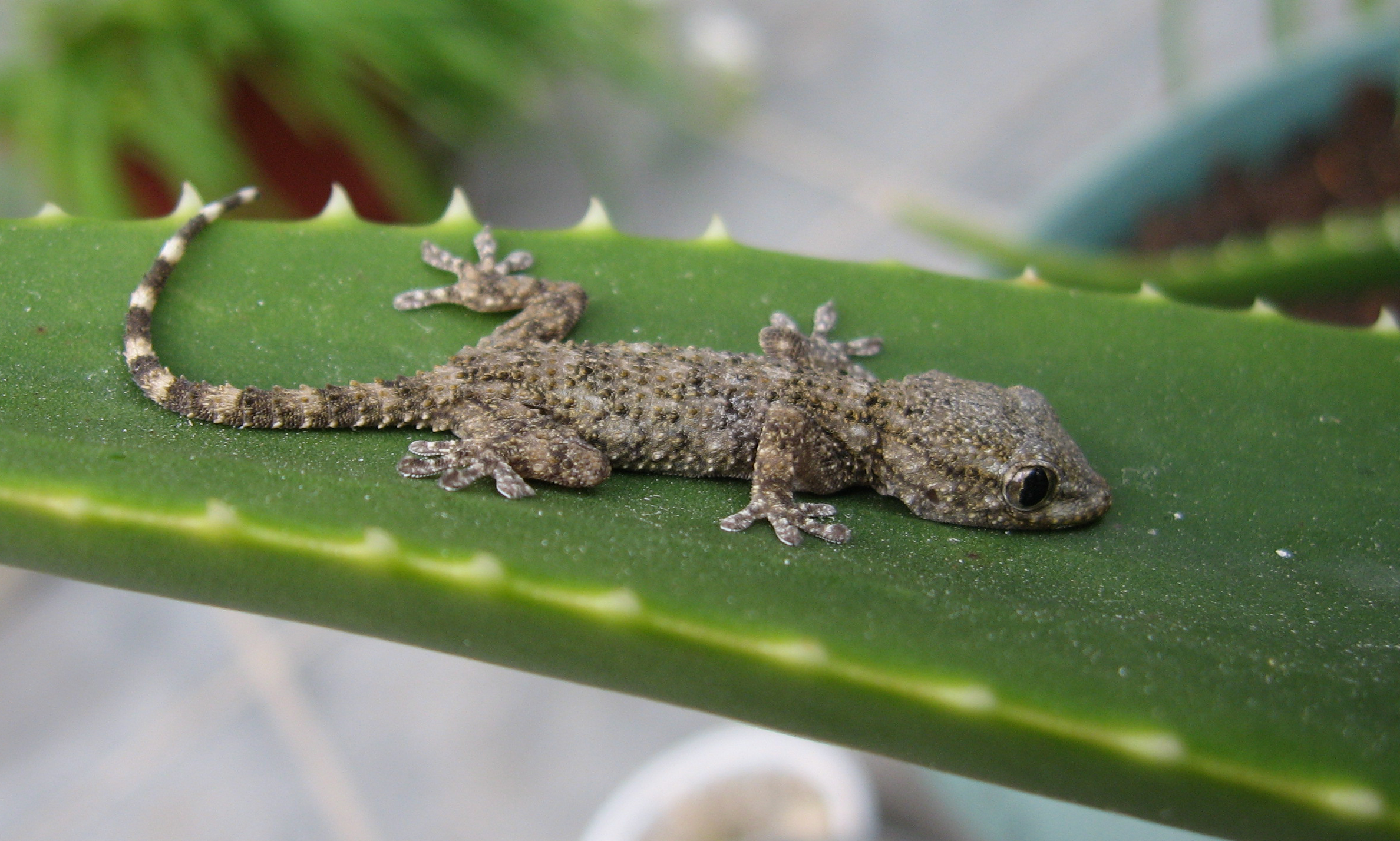
The gecko's toes adhere to surfaces via dry adhesion, to allow them to stay firmly attached to a branch or even a flat wall

Some species of primates, bats, and all species of sloths achieve passive stability by hanging beneath the branch. Both pitching and tipping become irrelevant, as the only method of failure would be losing their grip.

== Behavioral specializations ==
Arboreal species have behaviors specialized for moving in their habitats, most prominently in terms of posture and gait. Specifically, arboreal mammals take longer steps, extend their limbs further forwards and backwards during a step, adopt a more 'crouched' posture to lower their center of mass, and use a diagonal sequence gait.

=== Brachiation ===
Brachiation is a specialized form of arboreal locomotion, used by primates to move very rapidly while hanging beneath branches. Arguably the epitome of arboreal locomotion, it involves swinging with the arms from one handhold to another. Only a few species are brachiators, and all of these are primates; it is a major means of locomotion among spider monkeys and gibbons, and is occasionally used by female orangutans. Gibbons are the experts of this mode of locomotion, swinging from branch to branch distances of up to 15 m (50 ft), and traveling at speeds of as much as 56 km/h (35 mph).

=== Gliding and parachuting ===
To bridge gaps between trees, many animals such as the flying squirrel have adapted membranes, such as patagia for gliding flight. Some animals can slow their descent in the air using a method known as parachuting, such as Rhacophorus (a "flying frog" species) that has adapted toe membranes allowing it to fall more slowly after leaping from trees.

=== Limbless climbing ===
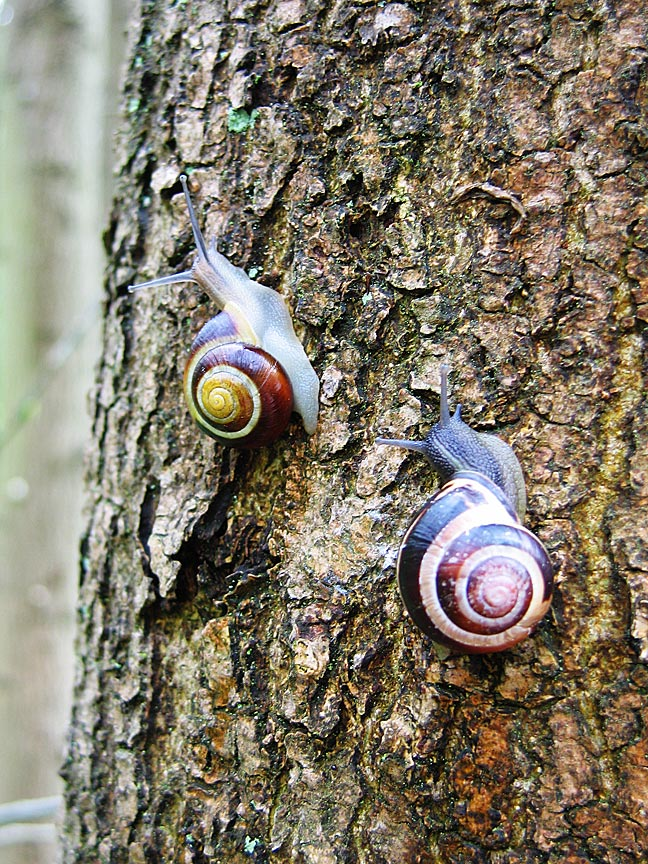
Arboreal snails use their sticky slime to help in climbing up trees

Many species of snake are highly arboreal, and some have evolved specialized musculature for this habitat. While moving in arboreal habitats, snakes move slowly along bare branches using a specialized form of concertina locomotion, but when secondary branches emerge from the branch being moved on, snakes use lateral undulation, a much faster mode. As a result, snakes perform best on small perches in cluttered environments, while limbed organisms seem to do best on large perches in uncluttered environments.

== Evolutionary history ==
The earliest known climbing tetrapod is the varanopid amniote Eoscansor from the Late Carboniferous (Pennsylvanian) of North America which is clearly specialised with adaptations for grasping, likely onto tree trunks. Suminia, a anomodont synapsid from Russia dating to the Late Permian, about 260 million years ago, was also likely a specialised climber.

== See also ==
- Suspensory behavior
- Cursorial
- Fossorial

== Sources ==
- Bertram, J. E. A.; Ruina, A.; Cannon, C. E.; Chang, Y. H.; Coleman, M. J. (1999). "A point-mass model of gibbon locomotion" (PDF). J. Exp. Biol. 202 (Pt 19): 2609–2617. Bibcode:1999JExpB.202.2609B. doi:10.1242/jeb.202.19.2609. PMID 10482720. Archived from the original (PDF) on 4 March 2016.
- Cartmill, M. (1974). Pads and claws in arboreal locomotion. In Primate Locomotion, (ed. F. A. J. Jenkins), pp. 45–83. New York: Academic Press.
- Jayne, B. C.; Riley, M. A. (2007). "Scaling of the axial morphology and gap-bridging ability of the brown tree snake (Boiga irregularis)" (PDF). J. Exp. Biol. 210 (7): 1148–1160. Bibcode:2007JExpB.210.1148J. doi:10.1242/jeb.002493. PMID 17371914. S2CID 2671049.
- Lammers, A.; Biknevicius, A. R. (2004). "The biodynamics of arboreal locomotion: the effects of substrate diameter on locomotor kinetics in the gray short-tailed opossum (Monodelphis domestica)". J. Exp. Biol. 207 (24): 4325–4336. Bibcode:2004JExpB.207.4325L. doi:10.1242/jeb.01231. PMID 15531652. S2CID 24341872.
- Lammers, A. R. (2000). "The effects of incline and branch diameter on the kinematics of arboreal locomotion". Am. Zool. 40: 1094.
- Socha, J. J. (2002). "Gliding flight in the paradise tree snake" (PDF). Nature. 418 (6898): 603–604. doi:10.1038/418603a. PMID 12167849. S2CID 4424131. Archived from the original (PDF) on 18 July 2011.
