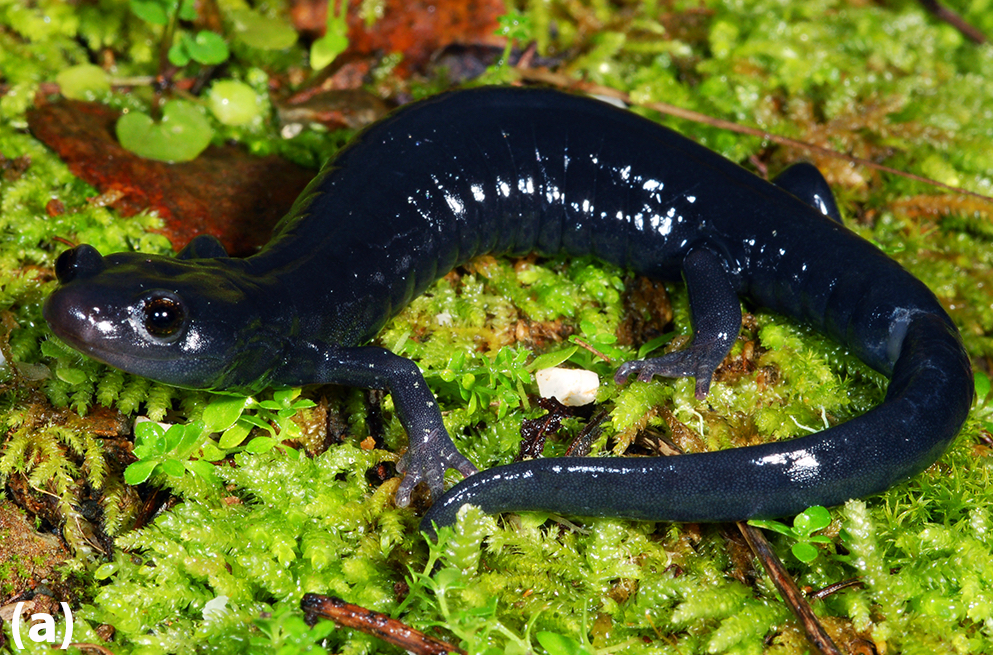

Conservation status
- Endangered (IUCN 3.1)

Scientific classification
- Kingdom: Animalia
- Phylum: Chordata
- Class: Amphibia
- Order: Urodela
- Family: Plethodontidae
- Genus: Aneides
- Species: A. niger

Binomial name
- Aneides niger Myers & Maslin, 1948

= Santa Cruz black salamander =

Species of salamander

The Santa Cruz black salamander (Aneides niger) is a species of salamander in the family Plethodontidae. It is endemic to the U.S. state of California.

== Taxonomy ==
Originally described by George S. Myers and Thomas P. Maslin in 1948 as a subspecies of the speckled black salamander (A. flavipunctatus), a 2019 taxonomic study found A. flavipunctatus to represent a species complex and A. niger to thus represent a distinct species, and reclassified it as such.

== Distribution ==
This is the southernmost member of the A. flavipunctatus complex, and it is disjunct from all other members of the complex. It is restricted to the San Francisco Peninsula of California, where it inhabits San Mateo, Santa Cruz, and western Santa Clara counties.

== Description ==
Unlike all other members of the Aneides flavipunctatus complex, adult individuals of this species have an almost uniformly black coloration; juveniles have numerous tiny white spots, as with other members of the complex, that are progressively lost as the individual matures.

== Status ==
It is classified as Endangered on the IUCN Red List due to its limited range, much of which has been developed over, has been affected by water diversions, or has been affected by recent severe wildfires such as the CZU complex fires. Climate change may also affect it due to it inhabiting an area that is already hotter and drier than other Aneides species.
