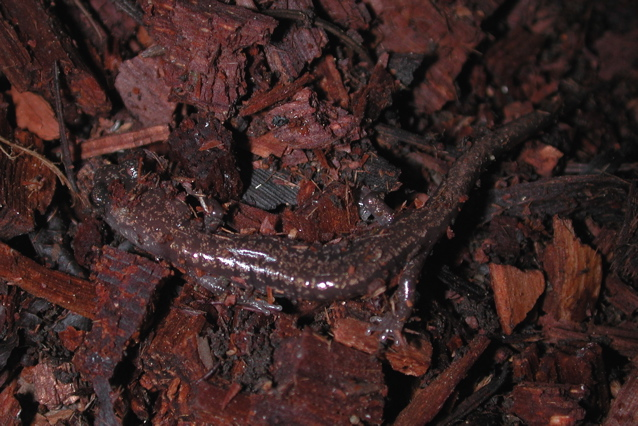

Conservation status
- Near Threatened (IUCN 3.1)

Scientific classification
- Kingdom: Animalia
- Phylum: Chordata
- Class: Amphibia
- Order: Urodela
- Family: Plethodontidae
- Genus: Aneides
- Species: A. hardii

Binomial name
- Aneides hardii (Taylor, 1941)

= Sacramento Mountain salamander =

Species of amphibian

The Sacramento Mountain salamander (Aneides hardii) is a species of salamander in the family Plethodontidae. It is endemic to mountainous regions of New Mexico in the United States. Its natural habitat is temperate forests where it is threatened by habitat loss.

== Distribution and habitat ==
The Sacramento Mountain salamander occurs in three separate mountainous areas in New Mexico, the Capitan Mountains, the Sierra Blanca range and the Sacramento Mountains. It is found at heights of at least 2,400 metres (7,900 ft) above sea level in mixed forests. It typically occurs on north or east facing slopes among Douglas fir, Engelmann spruce and white fir, often with an understory of Rocky Mountain maple. It often hides in the leaf litter or rotten logs, under rocks, fallen branches or vegetation. Above the tree line it is found in stony areas with mosses and lichens.

The only other salamander occurring in this area is the tiger salamander (Ambystoma tigrinum) and that is more of a lowland species and prefers grasslands, savannahs and woodland edges.

== Biology ==
The Sacramento Mountain salamander feeds on small invertebrates such as ants, rove beetles, springtails, snails and spiders. It is itself preyed on by the western terrestrial garter snake (Thamnophis elegans).

Breeding takes place in the summer with eggs being laid in small clutches inside rotten logs and stumps and also possibly in underground cavities. The larvae undergo direct development in the eggs with fully formed miniature salamanders hatching out measuring about 12 millimetres (0.47 in) in snout to vent length.

== Status ==
The Sacramento Mountain salamander is assessed as near threatened in the IUCN Red List of Threatened Species. It is common in the areas in which it occurs and is chiefly threatened by logging activities especially when associated with fire or the removal of fallen timber. Under current logging practices, it is believed that populations are stable.
