= Brachiator =

Brachiators are a type of primate mostly from the family Hylobatidae, which includes gibbons. Brachiators use their arms to move from tree branch to tree branch, through a process called brachiation. Their arms are longer than their legs, and are much more powerful.

Brachiation was traditionally used to explain the morphology of hominids and other primates - i.e. because they evolved the brachiating habit, they evolved the morphology they have....Pongines (orangutans) have long arms and supple hands, but detailed examination of their musculature reveals that they really can't brachiate too well - same goes for hominines -... Brachiators by design are gibbons and spider monkeys, which have odd upper arm muscles and reduced thumbs.

Female orang-utans are also brachiators - they are just less acrobatic about it than gibbons.

== Evolution ==
Brachiators began as four-footed monkey-like creatures in the Tertiary Era in Africa and Northern Europe. Eventually, some of the monkeys began to use their arms to swing, and lost their tails, due to evolution. They became apes with strong arms. Through the ages, the ape-like ancestors developed stronger arms and the shoulder blades moved from the side of their chests to the back of their bodies.

Most of these brachiators were smaller than average apes, so were able to move through the trees easier than gorillas or orangutans, although female orangutans do brachiate through the trees occasionally. The brachiators held their bodies upright in the trees, and would sometimes go on the ground and walk upright. This helped them survive in the plains when the forests began to die, because they were so unfamiliar to the predators that they would not be attacked.

== Physical features ==
Brachiators have:

- broad hip sockets
- broad upper bodies
- shoulder blades further back
- locking knee joints
- elongated heel bones
- aligned and longer big toes
- upright body position
- strong muscles behind the thighs and the pelvis
- bend in their loins
- slightly arched spine (S-shaped)
- hands adapted to grasping branches
- large incisors
