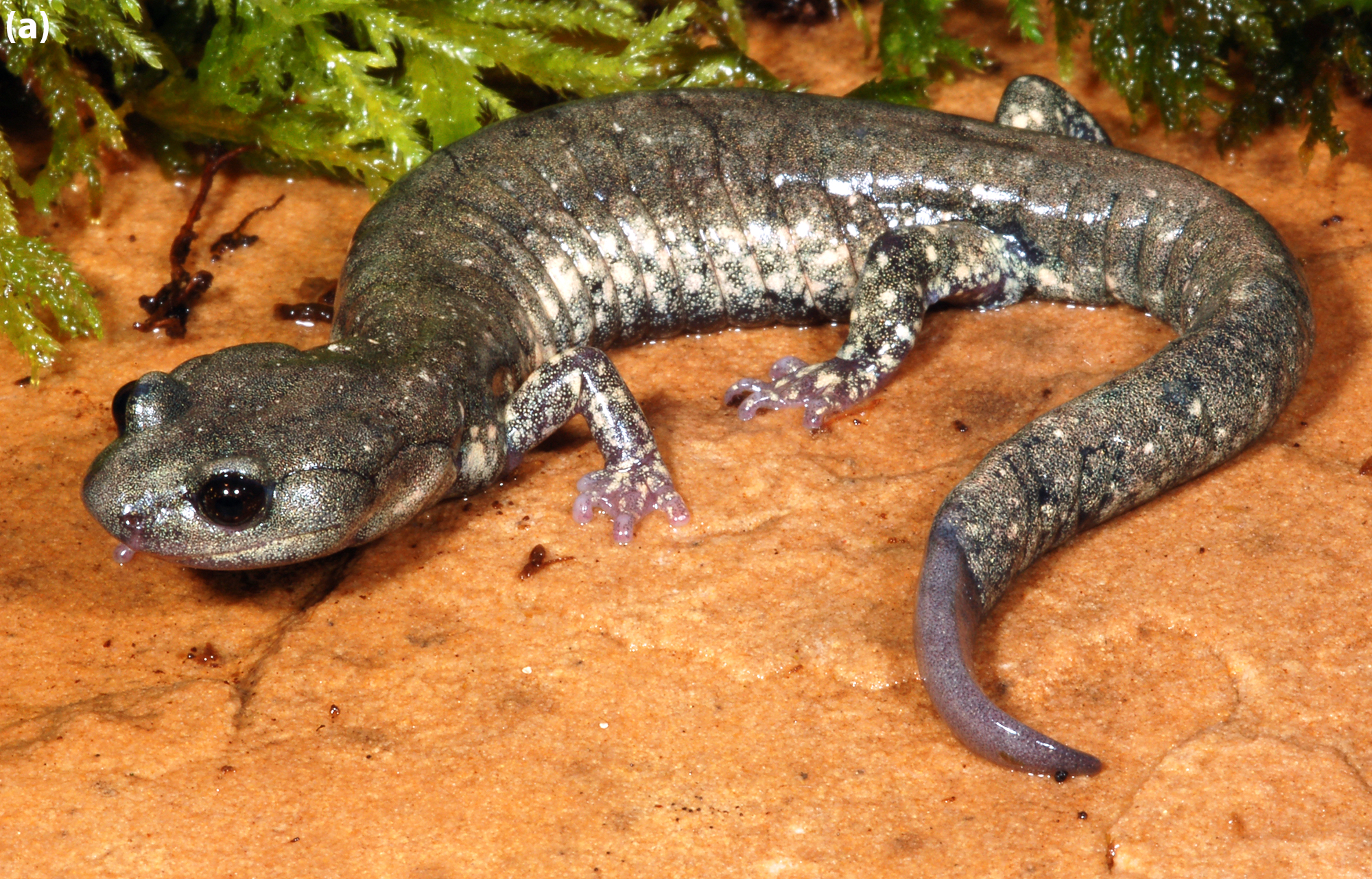

Conservation status
- Least Concern (IUCN 3.1)

Scientific classification
- Kingdom: Animalia
- Phylum: Chordata
- Class: Amphibia
- Order: Urodela
- Family: Plethodontidae
- Genus: Aneides
- Species: A. klamathensis

Binomial name
- Aneides klamathensis Reilly & Wake, 2019

= Klamath black salamander =

Species of salamander

The Klamath black salamander (Aneides klamathensis) is a species of salamander in the family Plethodontidae. It is endemic to the western United States.

== Taxonomy ==
Previously, it was considered a population of the speckled black salamander (A. flavipunctatus). However, a 2019 study found A. flavipunctatus to represent a species complex and split multiple species off it, including the Klamath population, which was described as Aneides klamathensis.

== Distribution ==
This species inhabits the Klamath Mountains in northern California and southern Oregon. It ranges from southeast-central Humboldt and Trinity counties in California north to southern Josephine and Jackson counties in Oregon.

== Description ==
This species has a solid black base coloration overlaid by greenish-gray frosting that extends down the trunk. Its limbs are heavily spotted with white to cream-colored spots, but this are largely scattered on other dorsal surfaces.
