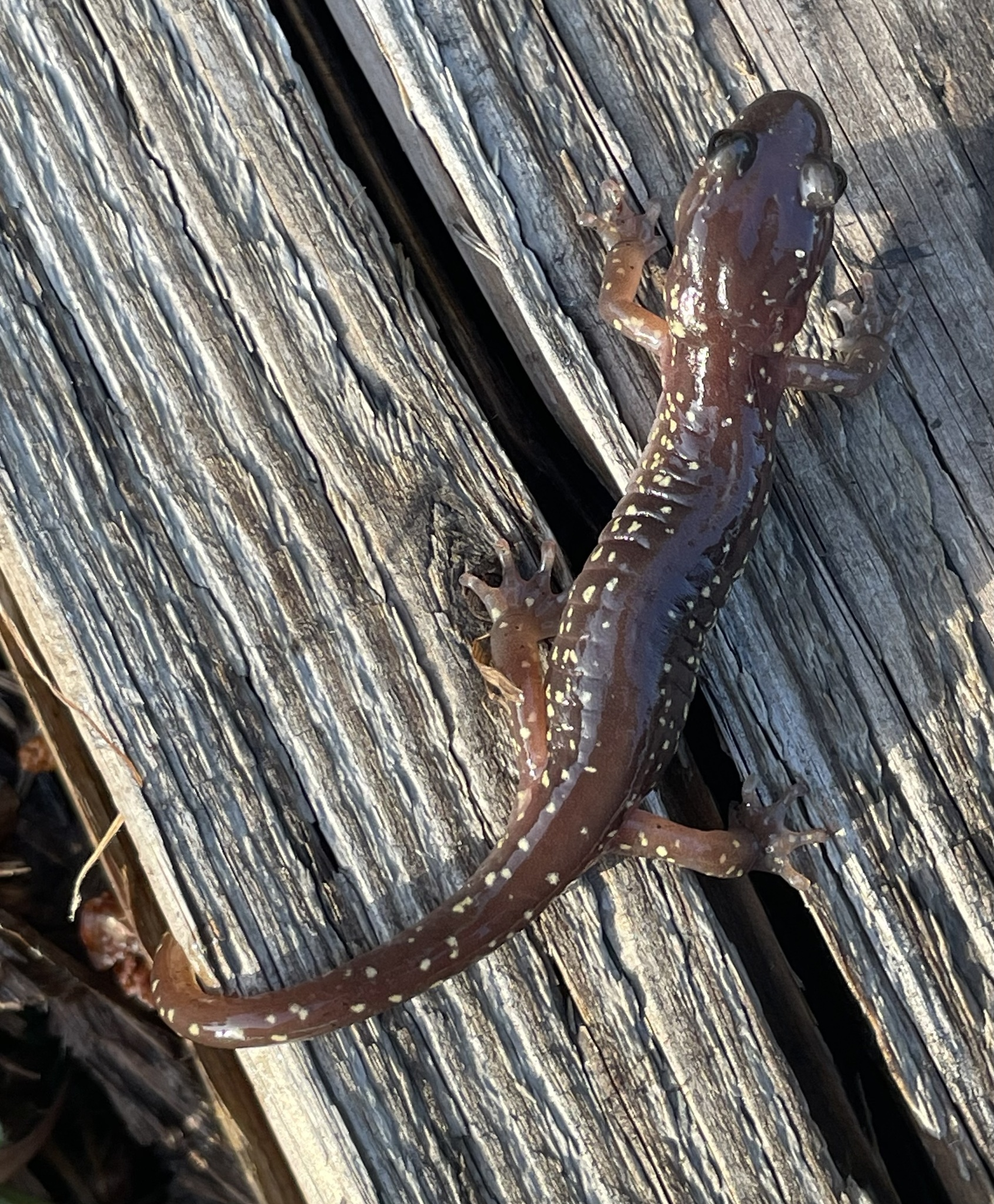

Conservation status
- Least Concern (IUCN 3.1)

Scientific classification
- Kingdom: Animalia
- Phylum: Chordata
- Class: Amphibia
- Order: Urodela
- Family: Plethodontidae
- Genus: Aneides
- Species: A. lugubris

Binomial name
- Aneides lugubris (Hallowell, 1849)

Synonyms
- Salamandra lugubris Hallowell, 1849 "1848"; Triton tereticauda Eschscholtz, 1833; Ambystoma punctulatum Gray, 1850; Plethodon crassulus Cope, 1886

= Arboreal salamander =

Species of amphibian

The arboreal salamander (Aneides lugubris) is a species of climbing salamander. An insectivore, it is native to California and Baja California, where it is primarily associated with oak and sycamore woodlands, and thick chaparral.

== Description ==
Aneides lugubris is 6.5–10 cm (2.6–3.9 in) SVL (snout-vent length), with plain purplish-brown coloring, usually spotted dorsally with gold or yellow, although it may also be unspotted. This salamander has longer and sharper teeth than many others within the order, Urodela. Aneides lugubris are insectivorous and have been found to eat beetles, caterpillars, sow bugs, ants, and centipedes. The tail is prehensile. The juvenile is dark overall, clouded with greyish color and fine yellow speckling on the back. The male of this species can be distinguished by its broad triangular head, with the front teeth of the jaw extending beyond the bottom lip. A large adult can inflict a painful bite.

This species is an excellent climber and difficult to capture. It is nocturnal, spending daylight hours and dry periods in the cavities of oak trees, often with many other individuals of its species. Having their primary habitat being in the trees, arboreal salamanders have been observed to deliberately use their body as a means to protect themselves from falls. The arboreal salamander has shown the ability to use its limbs to glide or parachute when falling. This behavior has been observed in which the arboreal salamander uses its body to create a controlled and directional fall to minimize injury when climbing trees. This aerial behavior is thought to be the result of generations of salamanders having to adapt to falling from their habitat. Arboreal salamanders hatch from eggs laid and guarded in burrows. Hatchling size is 24 mm SVL, age at maturity is 2.69 yr, and average adult age is 8–11 yr. Annual survival probability increases with age from 0.363 in age 0 to 0.783 in ages >4 yr.

The arboreal salamander exhibits a unique reproductive strategy in which the females lay their eggs in moist burrows, which the hatchlings then enter. The adult salamanders stay near their eggs to shield them from predators and environmental hazards, demonstrating parental care and increasing the hatchlings' chances of survival.

Because they are plethodontid (plethodontidae) salamanders they are lungless and breathe through their skin and membranes in their mouth and throat. Consequently, they thrive in moist terrestrial habitats, limiting their terrestrial activity to periods of elevated humidity. They spend most of their time under leaf litter of the forest ground, and during summer inside tree cavities to stay moist. This species have relatively low rates of water loss, possibly because of their rapid water intake and postural adaptation of curled body and tightly coiled tail. They can produce sounds which have been compared to a faintly barking dog. Their genus, Aneides, is characterized by their loss of the aquatic larval stage common in salamanders and their more unique arboreal and climbing tendency. Aneides lugubris are the largest species in its genus and are one of the three species of Aneides that occur in Western North America.

== Distribution and habitat ==
Arboreal salamanders are nearly California endemic species and they can be found in coastal woodlands, conifer forests, and shrublands. These salamanders are located in Humboldt County, North Baja California, and offshore islands of South Farallon, Los Coronados, Catalina, Año Nuevo, and San Francisco.

== Reproduction ==
Aneides lugubris will lay eggs in the holes of live oak trees, or under rocks, logs, or other cover on the ground beneath the dirt. Eggs are laid in late spring or early summer, and the clutch can range between 5-24 eggs. After 3–4 months, embryos hatch in August and September.

=== Courtship behavior ===
The male will put his mental gland on the back of a female, and use his teeth to scratch the surface of her skin to deliver the pheromones from the mental gland into the females blood stream.

=== Parental care ===
Females and males often both present, females can sometimes be found wrapped around the eggs.

== Anatomy and morphology ==
Compared to most other plethodontids, A. lugubris possesses much more developed teeth and jaws. Past the 2nd year of development the anterior part of the skull becomes heavily ossified and bulbous, with the teeth increasing in size but decreasing in number to increase the overall robustness of the jaw. Conversely, the long bones and pelvic plate of the body never finish ossifying throughout their lifespan.

== Taxonomy ==
=== Subspecies ===
- Farallon Island salamander – A. l. farallonensis (Van Denburgh, 1905)
- A. l. lugubris (Van Denburgh, 1905)

These subspecies have been proposed in the past due to genetic and morphological differences, but they are not currently recognized.

== Gallery ==
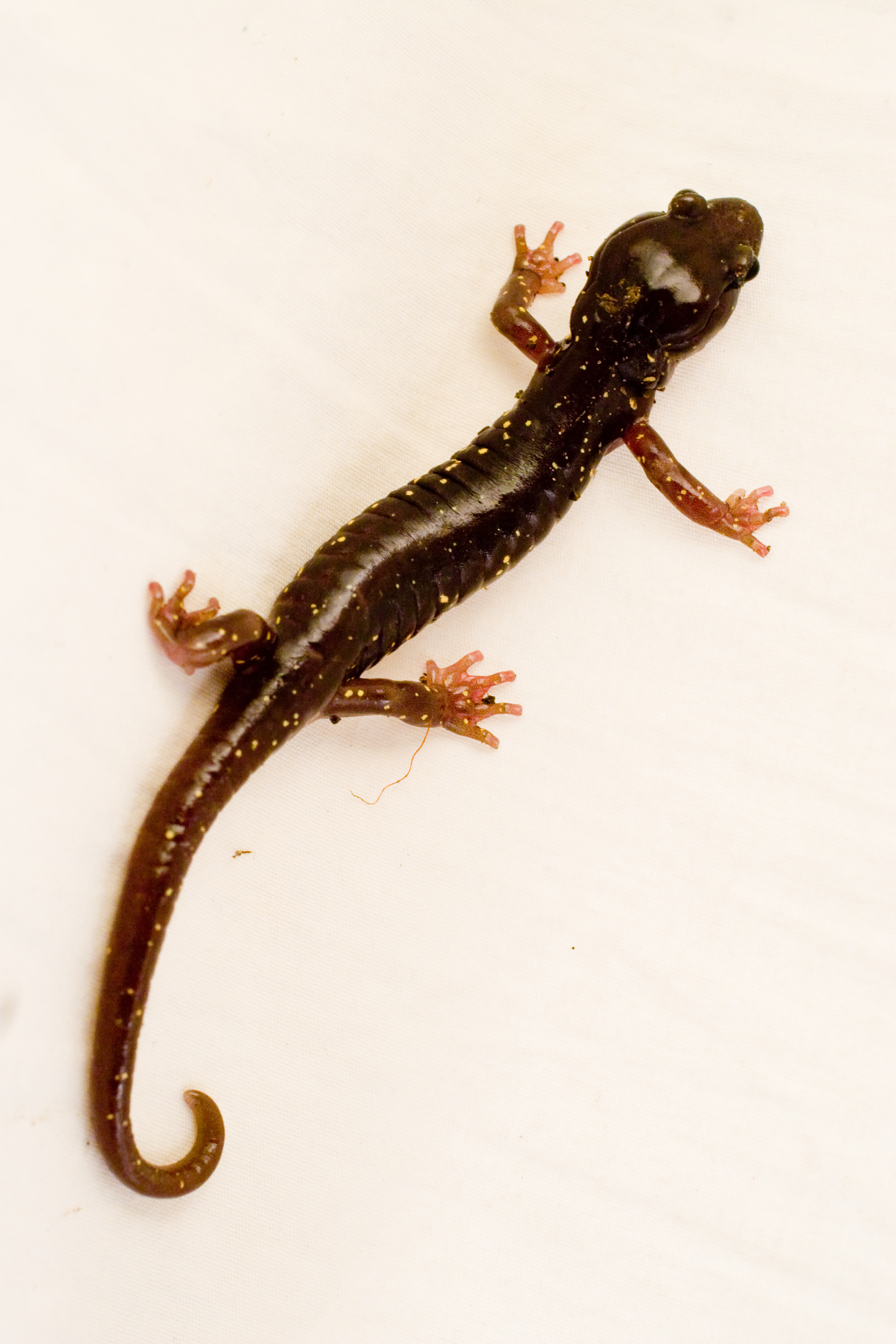
Adult

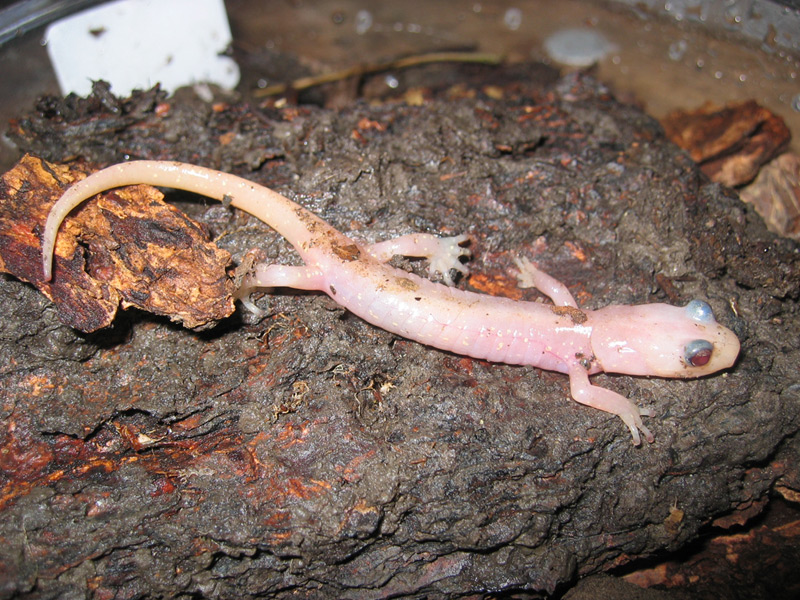
Albino individual found in Lafayette, California

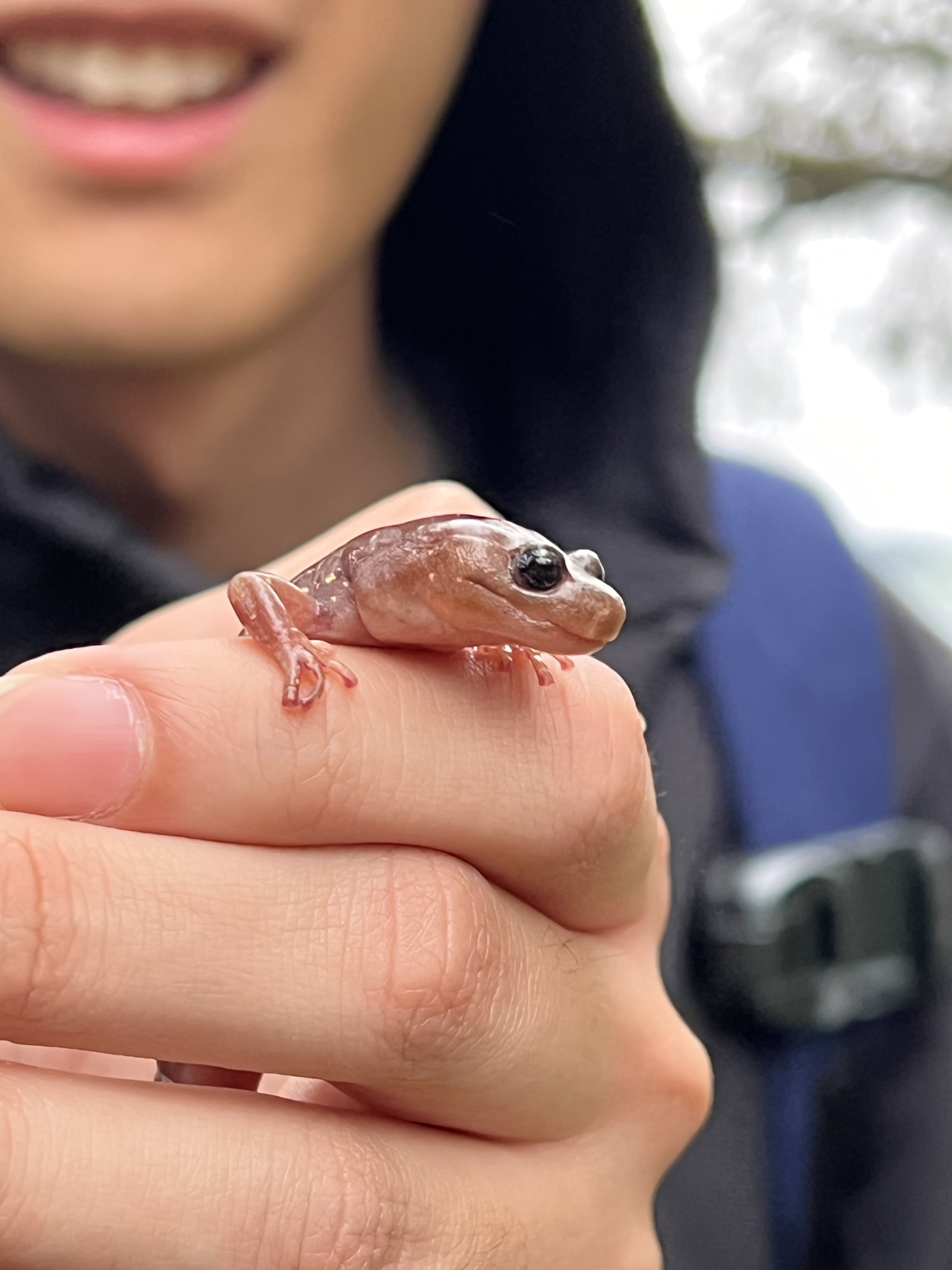
Aneides lugubris headshot. from the Bay Area of California
