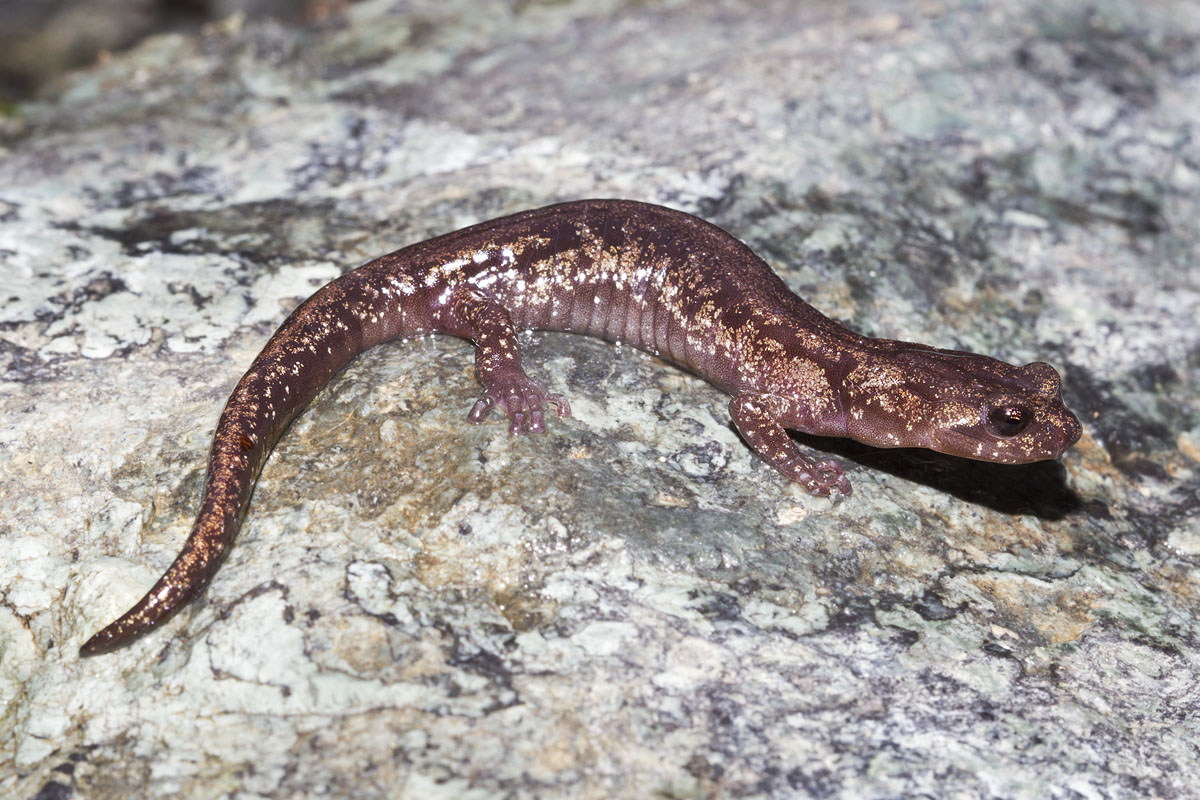

Conservation status
- Least Concern (IUCN 3.1)

Scientific classification
- Kingdom: Animalia
- Phylum: Chordata
- Class: Amphibia
- Order: Urodela
- Family: Plethodontidae
- Genus: Aneides
- Species: A. ferreus

Binomial name
- Aneides ferreus Cope, 1869

= Clouded salamander =

Species of amphibian

The clouded salamander (Aneides ferreus) is a species of salamander in the family Plethodontidae. It is endemic to the Pacific Northwest. Its natural habitat is temperate forests and it is probable that many nest in trees. It is threatened by habitat loss.

== Description ==
The clouded salamander can grow to about 5 inches (130 mm) total length. It is long and slim with relatively long legs, square ends to its toes and a prehensile tail. It has two naso-labial grooves joining its nostrils to its mouth and sixteen costal grooves down its flank. The upper side is pale grey variously blotched with gold, olive green or dull red. The juvenile has a brass-colored streak down the center of its back.

== Distribution and habitat ==
The clouded salamander is found in the Cascadian bioregion of North America at heights up to 1,700 metres (5,600 ft). Its range extends from the Columbia River southwards through the Cascade Mountains, along the Oregon coast to the northern tip of California in Del Norte County. It lives in forested areas favoring moist areas with few trees rather than dry dense stands. It hides under logs and rocks, under loose bark, in rotting logs and in crevices in rock and scree. It particularly favors rotting Douglas-fir logs. It is often common in newly cleared areas with tree stumps and debris.

== Biology ==
The clouded salamander feeds on small invertebrates, mainly woodlice, ants and beetles, but also include flies, termites, mites, centipedes, millipedes, spiders and pseudoscorpions.

Breeding takes place in June and July with females laying clutches of nine to seventeen eggs, usually in chambers hollowed out in rotting logs. The larvae develop inside the eggs, emerging as juveniles in about two months, thus bypassing the free-living larval stage. One or both parents may provide care for the eggs before they hatch.

== Status ==
The clouded salamander is listed as least concern in the IUCN Red List of Threatened Species. This salamander's favored microhabitat of tree stumps and coarse woody decaying debris are being replaced by changes in forestry practices. However, plans to conserve the spotted owl (Strix occidentalis) and the marbled murrelet (Brachyramphus marmoratus) may help to reduce the decline in numbers of clouded salamanders.
