= Philautus aurantium =

Conservation status
- Vulnerable (IUCN 3.1)

Scientific classification
- Kingdom: Animalia
- Phylum: Chordata
- Class: Amphibia
- Order: Anura
- Family: Rhacophoridae
- Genus: Philautus
- Species: P. aurantium

Binomial name
- Philautus aurantium Inger, 1989

Species of frog

Philautus aurantium (common names: Mendolong bubble-nest frog, golden-legged bush frog) is a species of frog in the family Rhacophoridae. It is endemic to Borneo and found in the Mount Kinabalu region in Sabah and Sarawak, Malaysia. Philautus gunungensis is sometimes considered its subspecies, Philautus aurantium gunungensis.

== Description ==
Philautus aurantium are relatively small frogs growing to 30 mm (1.2 in) in snout–vent length. The body is sand coloured with black spots scattered along flanks, on posterior part of dorsum, and on legs. It has pale orange groin and ventral side of thighs. Tympanum is indistinct.

== Habitat and conservation ==
Its natural habitats are primary montane and submontane forests 750–1,000 m (2,460–3,280 ft) asl. Males call from shrubs and small trees 2–4 metres above the ground. It is threatened by habitat loss caused by clear-cutting. It is present in the Kinabalu National Park.
