= P. cornutus =

P. cornutus may refer to:

- Pagurus cornutus, a crab species in the genus Pagurus
- Perissolestes cornutus, a damselfly species in the genus Perissolestes
- Philautus cornutus, a frog species endemic to Indonesia
- Phrynobatrachus cornutus, a frog species
- Physocyclus cornutus, a house spider species in the genus Physocyclus
- Plancinus cornutus, a crab spider species in the genus Plancinus
- Platystethus cornutus, a beetle species in the genus Platystethus
- Pleuronichthys cornutus, a flounder species
- Plexippoides cornutus, a jumping spider species in the genus Plexippoides

== See also ==
- Cornutus (disambiguation)
