= Mottled frog =

Mottled frog may refer to:

- Adler's mottled tree frog (Plectrohyla thorectes), a frog in the family Hylidae endemic to Mexico
- Mottled leaf frog (Phasmahyla exilis), a frog in the family Hylidae endemic to Brazil
- Mottled shovelnose frog (Hemisus marmoratus), a frog in the family Hemisotidae found in Africa
- Mottled tree frog (Philautus poecilius), a frog in the family Rhacophoridae endemic to the Philippines
- Oriente mottled frog (Eleutherodactylus simulans), a species of frog in the family Leptodactylidae endemic to Cuba
