= Philautus mjobergi =

Conservation status
- Least Concern (IUCN 3.1)

Scientific classification
- Kingdom: Animalia
- Phylum: Chordata
- Class: Amphibia
- Order: Anura
- Family: Rhacophoridae
- Genus: Philautus
- Species: P. mjobergi

Binomial name
- Philautus mjobergi Smith, 1925

Synonyms
- Philautus mjöbergi Smith, 1925; Philautus mjoebergi Smith, 1925

Species of frog

Philautus mjobergi is a species of frog in the family Rhacophoridae. It is endemic to northern Borneo and found in Kalimantan (Indonesia) and Sarawak (Malaysia). The specific name mjobergi honours Eric Mjöberg, a Swedish naturalist, ethnographer, and explorer. Common names Murud bubble-nest frog and Mjöberg's bush frog have been coined for it.

== Description ==
Adult males measure 18–24 mm (0.7–0.9 in) and adult females 22–32 mm (0.9–1.3 in) in snout–vent length. The appearance is stocky. The head is broader than it is long. The snout is rounded to elliptical. The tympanum is obscure. The finger and toe tips bear fleshy fringes and broad, oval discs; the fingers have rudimentary webbing while the more heavily webbed. The dorsal ground colour is pale grey to dark chestnut; the pattern is highly variable and may include bars, stripes, and mottling, or be plain. The iris is brown or goldish and has a horizontal dark bar.

== Habitat and conservation ==
Philautus mjobergi occurs in submontane forests and montane (oak-chestnut) forests at elevations of 900–3,000 m (3,000–9,800 ft) above sea level. Males call at night from the shrub layer 0.15–3 m (0.5–9.8 ft) above the ground. The eggs may be laid in pitcher plants.

This species may not be threatened because most logging occurs at lower elevations, although this statement is based on a higher lower limit for this species (1500 m) than found in other sources (800 m). It occurs in several protected areas, including Kinabalu Park and Gunung Mulu National Park.
