= Philautus ingeri =

Conservation status
- Vulnerable (IUCN 3.1)

Scientific classification
- Kingdom: Animalia
- Phylum: Chordata
- Class: Amphibia
- Order: Anura
- Family: Rhacophoridae
- Genus: Philautus
- Species: P. ingeri

Binomial name
- Philautus ingeri Dring, 1987

Synonyms
- Leptomantis ingeri (Dring, 1987)

Species of frog

Philautus ingeri is a species of frog in the family Rhacophoridae. The species is endemic to northern Borneo, where it is found in Sabah, Sarawak (East Malaysia), Brunei, and adjacent northern Kalimantan (Indonesia). The common names Inger's bush frog and Inger's bubble-nest frog have been coined for it. It is named for Robert F. Inger, American zoologist from the Field Museum of Natural History.

== Description ==
Adult males of P. ingeri measure about 36 mm (1.4 in) and adult females 47–50 mm (1.9–2.0 in) in snout–vent length (SVL); it is a relatively large member of the genus Philautus. The head is slightly longer than it is wide. The snout is depressed, elliptical in dorsal view and pointed and projecting in lateral view. The canthus is angular and nearly straight. The tympanum is distinct. The finger and toe tips have broad, oval discs. The fingers show distinct web rudiments, whereas the toes have partial webbing. The dorsum is brown. There is a dark triangle between the eyes, joined to a lyre-shaped mid-dorsal dark marking. The limbs have cross-bars. There is a broad black canthal stripe widening to the eye, a dark blotch below the eye, and a dark line below the supratympanic ridge. The iris is gold in its upper third and dark brown elsewhere.

The male advertisement call is a series of five notes.

== Habitat ==
P. ingeri inhabits montane forests at elevations of 1,300–1,600 m (4,300–5,200 ft) above sea level.

== Behavior ==
P. ingeri is nocturnal. Males call from shrubs 1–4 m (3–13 ft) above the ground.

== Reproduction ==
Reproduction in P. ingeri is presumed to be direct (that is, eggs hatching to froglets, without free-living tadpole stage).

== Conservation status ==
The habitat of P. ingeri is fragmented and threatened by clear-cutting. However, it occurs in the Gunung Mulu National Park and Kinabalu National Park.
