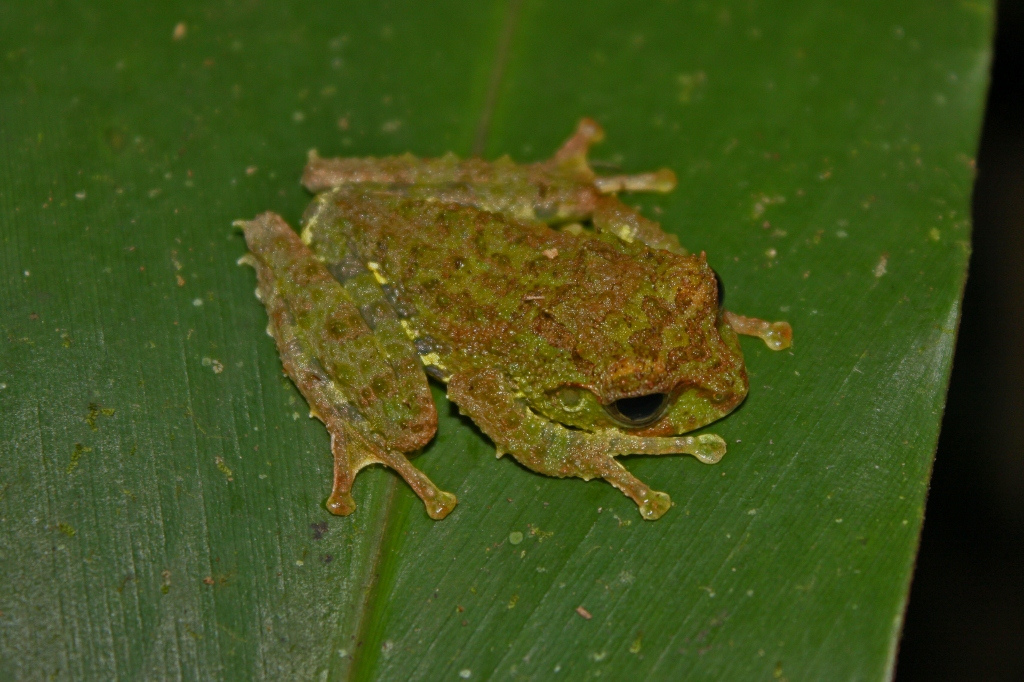

Conservation status
- Endangered (IUCN 3.1)

Scientific classification
- Kingdom: Animalia
- Phylum: Chordata
- Class: Amphibia
- Order: Anura
- Family: Rhacophoridae
- Genus: Philautus
- Species: P. everetti

Binomial name
- Philautus everetti (Boulenger, 1894)

Synonyms
- Rhacophorus everetti Boulenger, 1894

= Philautus everetti =

Species of frog

Philautus everetti is a species of frog in the family Rhacophoridae found in the Philippines and Malaysia. Its natural habitats are subtropical or tropical moist lowland forests, subtropical or tropical moist montane forests, and rivers. In Borneo, this species occurs in the mountainous area from Gunung Kinabalu National Park in Sabah to Gunung Mulu National Park in Sarawak. It is usually observed between 750 and 1800 meters above sea level, but it is rarely seen as low as 300 meters above sea level.

The adult male frog measures 30–32 mm in snout-vent length and the adult female frog 45–49 mm. This frog can be green or brown in color. There is an intraorbital mark on the face.

This frog is threatened by habitat loss. Scientists attribute this to deforestation related to logging. Some of this frog's habitat falls within protected parks.
