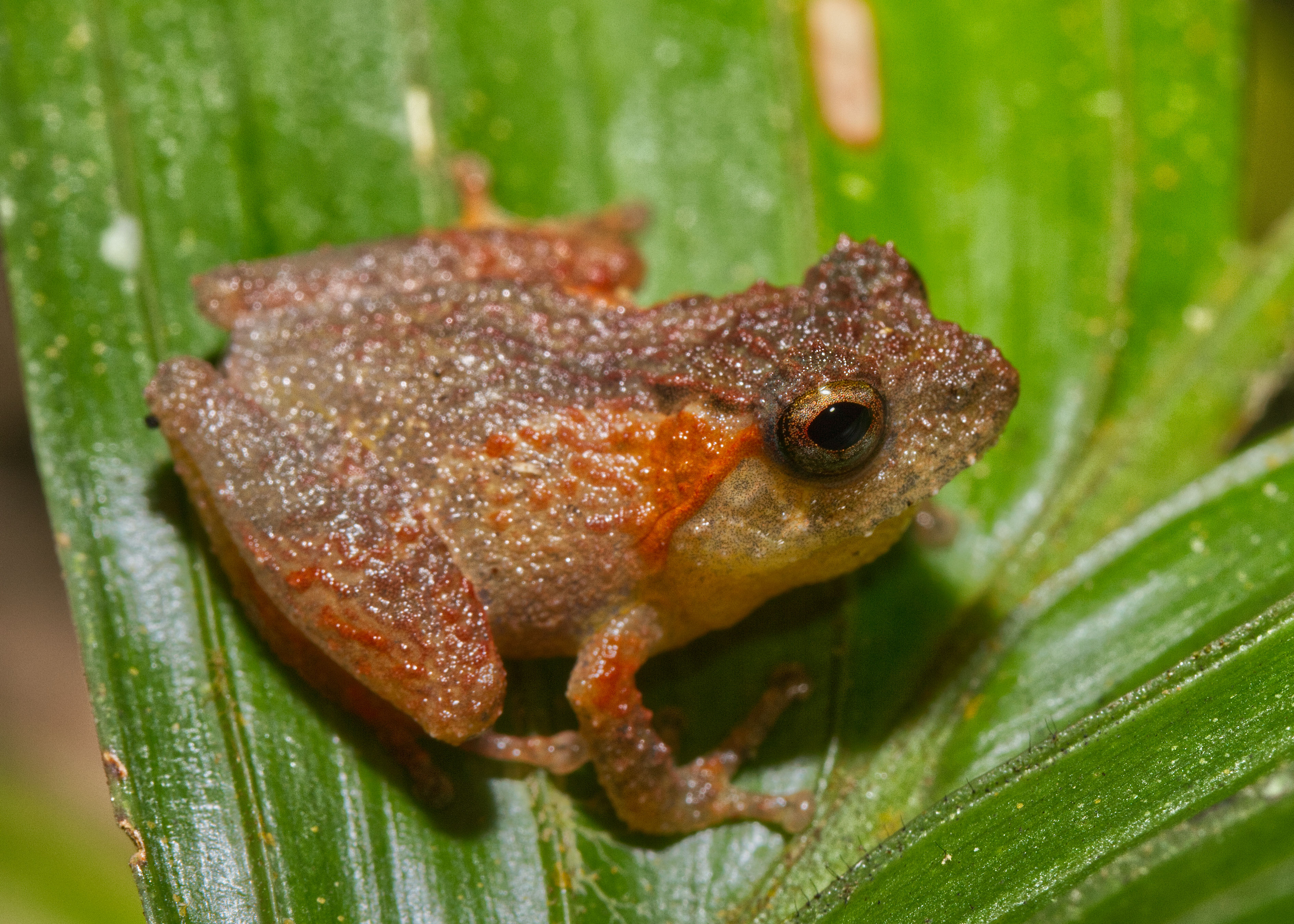
- Philautus petersi in Kinabalu Park

Conservation status
- Data Deficient (IUCN 3.1)

Scientific classification
- Kingdom: Animalia
- Phylum: Chordata
- Class: Amphibia
- Order: Anura
- Family: Rhacophoridae
- Genus: Philautus
- Species: P. petersi

Binomial name
- Philautus petersi (Boulenger, 1900)

Synonyms
- Ixalus castanomerus Boulenger, 1905; Ixalus larutensis Boulenger, 1900

= Philautus petersi =

Species of frog

Philautus petersi is a species of frog in the family Rhacophoridae. It is found in Indonesia, Malaysia, Thailand, and possibly Brunei. Its natural habitats are subtropical or tropical moist lowland forests and subtropical or tropical moist montane forests.

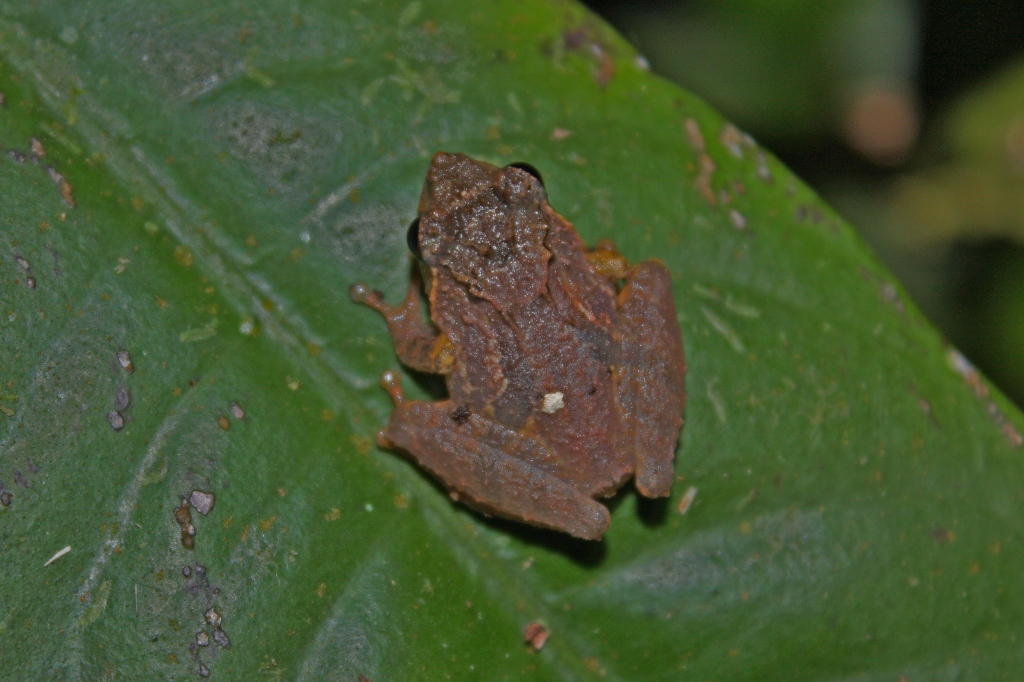
The dorsum can be highly variable.

It is threatened by habitat loss.
