= Ponmudy =

Ponmudy may refer to:

- K. Ponmudy (born 1950), ex minister for higher education in Tamil Nadu
- Ponmudy (film), a 1982 Indian Malayalam film

== See also ==
- Ponmudi, town and hill station in Kerala, India
  - Ponmudi Dam
  - Ponmudi day gecko
  - Ponmudi Hills Bubble-nest Frog
- Ponmudi (film), 1950 Indian film by Ellis R. Dungan
- Ponmudiyar, ancient Indian poet of the Tamil Sangam period
