= Philautus catbaensis =

Conservation status
- Endangered (IUCN 3.1)

Scientific classification
- Kingdom: Animalia
- Phylum: Chordata
- Class: Amphibia
- Order: Anura
- Family: Rhacophoridae
- Genus: Philautus
- Species: P. catbaensis

Binomial name
- Philautus catbaensis Milto, Poyarkov, Orlov, and Nguyen, 2013

Species of frog

Philautus catbaensis, the Cat Ba shrub frog, is a frog in the family Rhacophoridae. It is endemic to Vietnam, where it has been observed on Cat Ba Island in Cát Bà National Park, which ranges from 0 to 300 meters above sea level.

This frog is classified as endangered because of its small range, in which notable deforestation is ongoing, mostly attributable to agriculture.

== Original description ==
- Milto KD; Poyarkov Jr NA; Orlov NL; Hguyen TT (2013). "Two new rhacophorid frogs from Cat Ba Island, Gulf of Tonkin, Vietnam". Russian J Herpetol (Abstract and figures). 20 (4): 287–300.
