= Philautus surrufus =

Conservation status
- Near Threatened (IUCN 3.1)

Scientific classification
- Kingdom: Animalia
- Phylum: Chordata
- Class: Amphibia
- Order: Anura
- Family: Rhacophoridae
- Genus: Philautus
- Species: P. surrufus

Binomial name
- Philautus surrufus Brown & Alcala, 1994

Species of amphibian

Philautus surrufus, Malindang tree frog, or molted tree frog is a species of frog in the family Rhacophoridae.

It is endemic to the Philippines. Its natural habitats are subtropical or tropical moist lowland forests and subtropical or tropical moist montane forests. It has been observed it near Mount Malindang between 800 and 2300 meters above sea level. It is threatened by habitat loss.
