= Philautus amabilis =

Scientific classification
- Kingdom: Animalia
- Phylum: Chordata
- Class: Amphibia
- Order: Anura
- Family: Rhacophoridae
- Genus: Philautus
- Species: P. amabilis

Binomial name
- Philautus amabilis Wostl, Riyanto, Hamidy, Kurniawan, Smith, and Harvey, 2017

Species of frog

Philautus amabilis is a species of frog in the family Rhacophoridae. It is endemic to the mountains of Sumatra in Indonesia. It has been observed between 1550 and 1636 meters above sea level at one site and 1825 meters above sea level at another.

== Original description ==
- Wostl E; Riyanto A; Hamidy A; Kurniawan N; Smith EN; Harvey MB (2017). "A taxonomic revision of the Philautus (Anura: Rhacophoridae) of Sumatra with the description of four new species". Herpetological Monographs (Abstract). 31 (1): 98–141. doi:10.1655/HERPMONOGRAPHS-D-16-00007.
