= Philautus tytthus =

Conservation status
- Data Deficient (IUCN 3.1)

Scientific classification
- Kingdom: Animalia
- Phylum: Chordata
- Class: Amphibia
- Order: Anura
- Family: Rhacophoridae
- Genus: Philautus
- Species: P. tytthus

Binomial name
- Philautus tytthus Smith, 1940

Species of frog

Philautus tytthus is a species of frog in the family Rhacophoridae. It is endemic to northern Myanmar, but its range may extend to adjacent Yunnan (China). It is a little known species that has not been recorded since the type series was collected in the 1930s.
