= Philautus kempiae =

Conservation status
- Critically Endangered (IUCN 3.1)

Scientific classification
- Kingdom: Animalia
- Phylum: Chordata
- Class: Amphibia
- Order: Anura
- Family: Rhacophoridae
- Genus: Philautus
- Species: P. kempiae

Binomial name
- Philautus kempiae (Boulenger, 1919)

Synonyms
- Ixalus kempiae Boulenger, 1919

Species of frog

Philautus kempiae (Tura bubble-nest frog, Kemp's bush frog) is a species of frog in the family Rhacophoridae (not to be confused with Philautus kempii). Being only known from its type locality near Tura in the Garo Hills in Meghalaya, northeastern India, it is an Indian endemic. The specific name kempiae honours Agnes Kemp, wife of Stanley Wells Kemp, an English zoologist and anthropologist. It is known only from the type specimen, so very little is known about biology of this species. It is presumed to be a dweller of the undergrowth of moist evergreen forests.

This frog measures about 17 mm in snout-vent length. There is webbed skin on the hind feet only. There are large disks on the toes for climbing. There is a black intraorbital mark and another on the back. The belly is white with brown marks. This frog has a rounded snout.
