= Stanley Wells Kemp =

British marine biologist

Stanley Wells Kemp, FRS (14 June 1882 – 16 May 1945) was an English marine biologist.

He was born in London, the second of three sons of Stephen Kemp, a professor at the Royal Academy and Royal School of Music. As a boy he took an interest in animals, collecting water beetles and maintaining them in aquariums and was a member of the local natural history society. He studied at St Paul's School and later went to Trinity College in Dublin from where he graduated with a gold medal in 1903. He studied botany under H. H. Dixon.

In 1910 he joined the Zoological and Anthropological section of the Indian Museum and when the organization was converted in 1916 to the Zoological Survey of India, he became Superintendent and took up the study of crustaceans to continue work started by James Wood-Mason and Alfred William Alcock. He spent fourteen years in India during which he published seventeen papers on the decapods in the Indian Museum. In 1918 he made a trip to Baluchistan along with Thomas Nelson Annandale. Other expeditions were made to the Andaman Islands, the Abor Hills, the Garo Hills and Rameshwaram. In 1913 he married Agnes Green, daughter of Reverend William Spotswood Green who was the first to climb Mount Cook in New Zealand. In 1910 he became a Fellow of Calcutta University and a Fellow of the Asiatic Society. In 1924 he returned to Ireland to become the first director of research in the Discovery Investigations.

He was Director of the Marine Biological Association from 1936 to 1945.

Among the discoveries he made were the first onychophoran from the Indian region which he named as Typhloperipatus williamsoni.

He died in Plymouth, Devon in 1945. The National Marine Biological Library at the Marine Biological Association hold some of his scientific and personal papers in the MBA Archive Collection.

Frogs Philautus kempii and Bufoides kempi are named after him; Philautus kempiae is named after his wife. In 2018, researchers from the Zoological Survey of India have named a new species of crab, Teretamon kempi, discovered from Namdapha, Arunachal Pradesh after him.
