= Philautus umbra =

Conservation status
- Least Concern (IUCN 3.1)

Scientific classification
- Kingdom: Animalia
- Phylum: Chordata
- Class: Amphibia
- Order: Anura
- Family: Rhacophoridae
- Genus: Philautus
- Species: P. umbra

Binomial name
- Philautus umbra Dring, 1987

Species of frog

Philautus umbra (common names: pinnacle bush frog, pinnacle bubble-nest frog) is a species of frog in the family Rhacophoridae. It is endemic to Borneo and only known from Mount Api in northern Sarawak, Malaysia, although it might also occur in the adjacent Brunei.

== Description ==
Philautus umbra is a relatively large Philautus species, reaching 35 mm (1.4 in) snout–vent length. During the day, these frogs are almost uniformly blackish above, whereas during the night the colouration lightens up to light grey. Fingers are long with broad adhesive disks.

== Habitat and conservation ==
Its natural habitat is submontane forest at elevations of 900–1,300 m (3,000–4,300 ft) above sea level. Males have been observed calling from near the ground up to 2 metres above the ground. There are no known threats to this species residing with the Gunung Mulu National Park, but its restricted range has led to its listing as "Vulnerable" by the International Union for Conservation of Nature (IUCN).
