= Philautus kakipanjang =

Scientific classification
- Kingdom: Animalia
- Phylum: Chordata
- Class: Amphibia
- Order: Anura
- Family: Rhacophoridae
- Genus: Philautus
- Species: P. kakipanjang

Binomial name
- Philautus kakipanjang Dehling and Dehling, 2013
- Philautus kakipanjang is known from Gunung Serapi and some nearby mountains in Sarawak, Borneo (Malaysia)

Species of amphibian

Philautus kakipanjang, also known as the western long-legged bush frog and long-legged bush frog, is a species of frog in the family Rhacophoridae. As currently known, it is endemic to Sarawak in the Malaysian part of Borneo and recorded with certainty from two mountains, Gunung Serapi and Gunung Gading. Furthermore, there is an acoustic observation from Gunung Santubong that probably can be assigned to this species. The species is probably more widespread in the mountains of western Sarawak, if not beyond.

== Etymology ==
The specific name kakipanjang is derived from the Malay words kaki (="leg") and panjang (="long"), in reference to the relatively long hind limbs of this frog.

== Description ==
Adult males measure 21–24 mm (0.8–0.9 in) in snout–vent length; females are unknown. The body is moderately sturdy and the head is large. The snout is long, acuminate in dorsal view and rounded in lateral profile. The tympanum is distinct, although its posterodorsal quarter is hidden by skin. The limbs are slender; the hind limbs are long. The fingers and toes are webbed and bear broad, oval terminal discs. During the night, dorsal colouration is reddish-cream-coloured with faint greyish-brown markings. There are light brown stripes along the canthus rostralis, between the eyes, and parallel to spine on the dorsum. The limbs bear faint crossbars. During the day, the dorsum is light brown with dark brown, conspicuous markings. The sides of the head below canthus rostralis, eye, and supratympanic fold are almost uniformly dark brown. The tympanum is yellowish brown. The iris is golden. Males have a median subgular vocal sac.

The male advertisement call consists of a single note composed of 9–12 pulses and lasting 342–478 ms, with the duration being positively correlated with the pulse number. The dominant frequency ranges from about 2200 Hz (first 2–3 pulses) to about 2500 Hz (the rest).

== Habitat ==
Philautus kakipanjang occurs at elevations upwards of about 750 m (2,460 ft), that is, where the lowland mixed dipterocarp forest is replaced by the lower montane forest. Males call from low bushes and from tops of small trees, about 0.5–3 m (2–10 ft) above the ground.

== Conservation ==
As of November 2021, this species has not been included in the IUCN Red List of Threatened Species. All known populations reside within national parks: the type locality is in the Kubah National Park, and the two other populations reside in Gunung Gading and Santubong National Parks, respectively.
