= Philautus davidlabangi =

Conservation status
- Least Concern (IUCN 3.1)

Scientific classification
- Kingdom: Animalia
- Phylum: Chordata
- Class: Amphibia
- Order: Anura
- Family: Rhacophoridae
- Genus: Philautus
- Species: P. davidlabangi

Binomial name
- Philautus davidlabangi Matsui, 2009

Species of frog

Philautus davidlabangi, or David Labang's bush frog, is a species of frog in the family Rhacophoridae. It is endemic to Malaysia, where it has been observed in the Cardamon Mountains, 859 meters above sea level at one site and between 165 and 330 meters above sea level at another.

The adult male frog measures 20–21 mm in snout-vent length. This frog has longer legs and more extensive webbing than other frogs in Philautus.

Scientists believe this frog grows through direct development with no free-swimming tadpole stage, but this has not been confirmed.

This frog is not classified as endangered, though it is subject to habitat degradation.
