= Philautus microdiscus =

Conservation status
- Critically Endangered (IUCN 3.1)

Scientific classification
- Kingdom: Animalia
- Phylum: Chordata
- Class: Amphibia
- Order: Anura
- Family: Rhacophoridae
- Genus: Philautus
- Species: P. microdiscus

Binomial name
- Philautus microdiscus (Annandale, 1912)

Synonyms
- Rhacophorus microdiscus Annandale, 1912

Species of frog

Philautus microdiscus (Kobo bubble-nest frog) is a species of frog in the family Rhacophoridae. It is endemic to India, only known from Abor Hills in Arunachal Pradesh (in the region also claimed by China). This little-known species inhabits tropical moist lowland forests.
