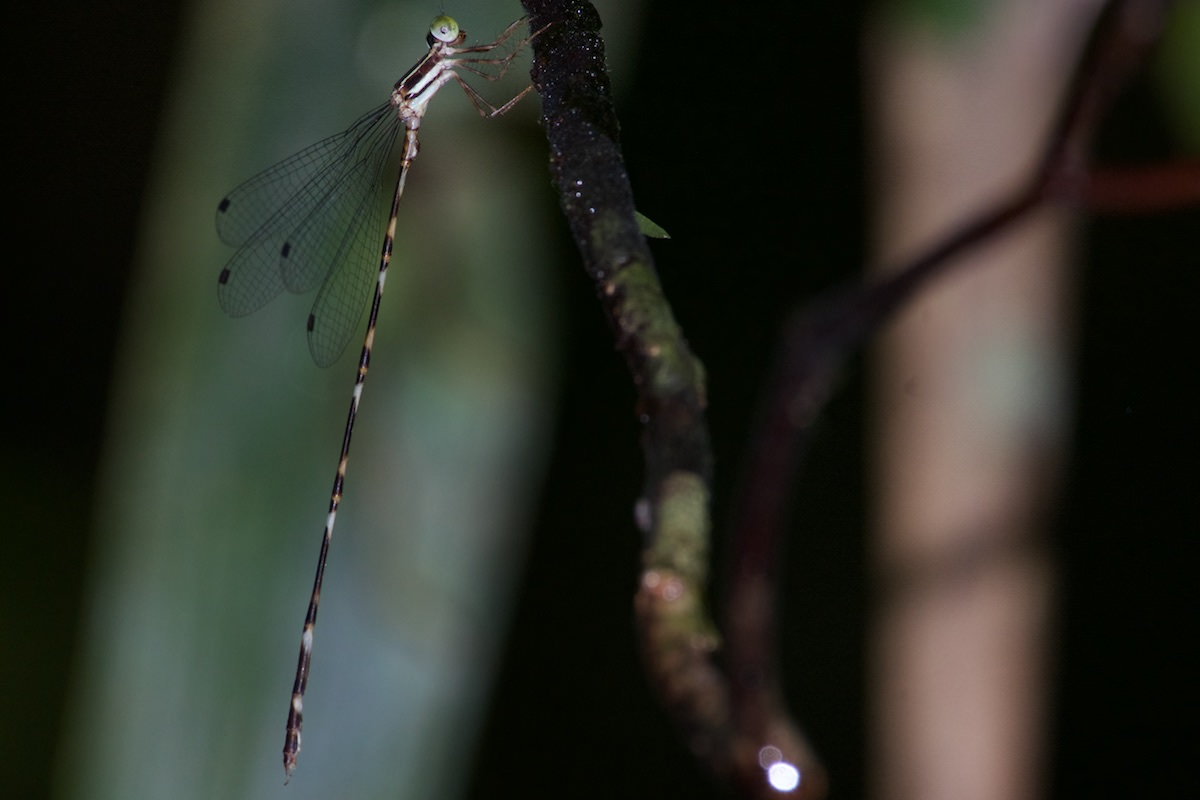
- Perissolestes guianensis

Scientific classification
- Kingdom: Animalia
- Phylum: Arthropoda
- Clade: Pancrustacea
- Class: Insecta
- Order: Odonata
- Suborder: Zygoptera
- Superfamily: Lestoidea
- Family: Perilestidae; Kennedy, 1920
- Distribution of Perilestidae

= Perilestidae =

Perilestidae Temporal range: Cenomanian–Recent

Family of damselflies

Perilestidae is a family of damselflies commonly known as shortwings or twigtails. The family includes about 20 living species in two genera, all of which occur in the tropical regions of the Americas. Members of the family are characterised by their very long, slender abdomens and relatively short wings, giving them a distinctive twig-like appearance.

== Classification ==
Perilestidae was established by Kennedy in 1920 as Perilestinae, based on the Neotropical genus Perilestes. Modern studies support the family as a distinct lineage within the superfamily Lestoidea. The African genus Nubiolestes, formerly included in Perilestidae, was transferred to Synlestidae by Dijkstra and colleagues (2013).

== Description ==
Perilestids are slender forest damselflies with very long, narrow abdomens and comparatively short wings. They typically inhabit shaded tropical forests, where they rest among vegetation with the abdomen hanging vertically.

== Genera ==
The following genera are currently placed in Perilestidae:

- Perilestes Hagen in Selys, 1862
- Perissolestes Kennedy, 1941

== Fossils ==
The fossil record of Perilestidae consists of the extinct genus †Palaeoperilestes, described from mid-Cretaceous Burmese amber.

- †Palaeoperilestes Zheng et al. 2016
