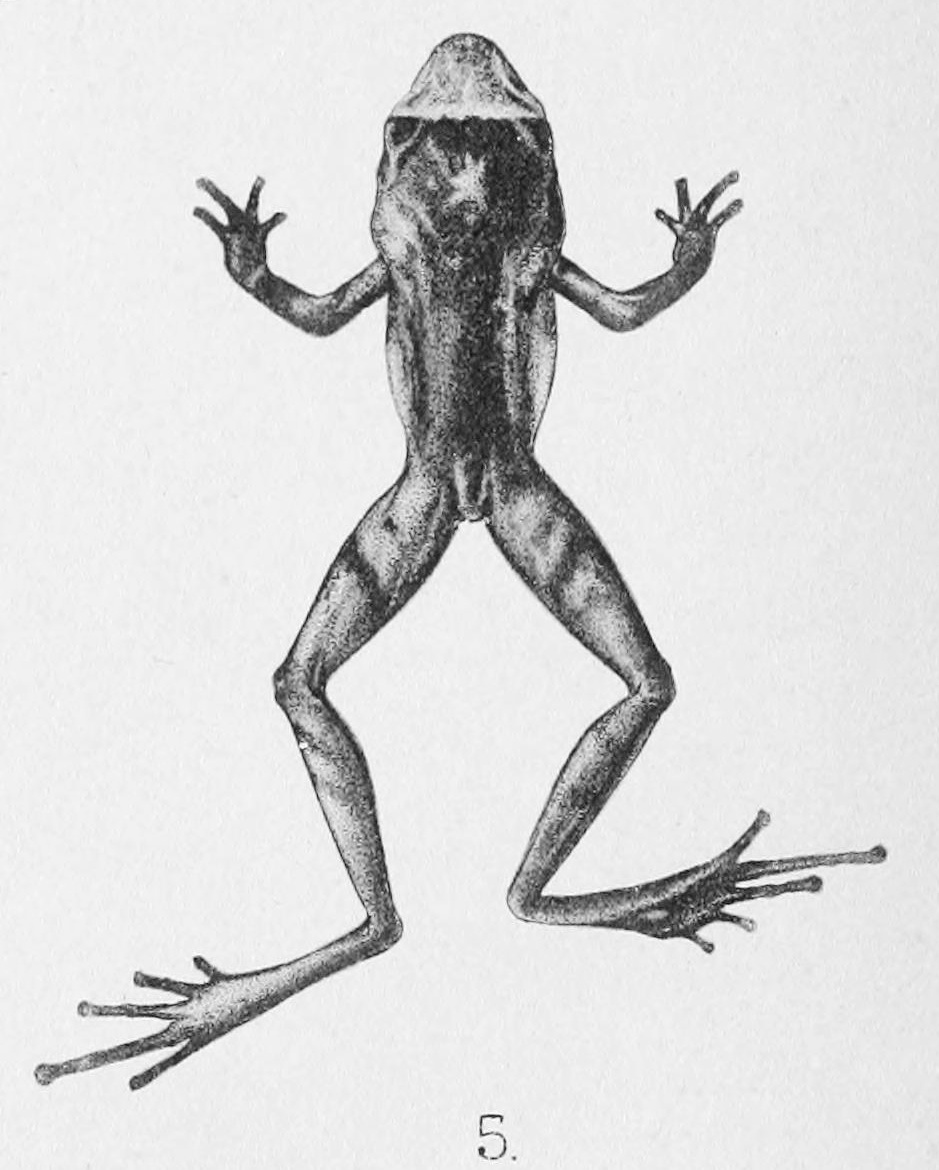
- Illustration from the original species description

Conservation status
- Data Deficient (IUCN 3.1)

Scientific classification
- Kingdom: Animalia
- Phylum: Chordata
- Class: Amphibia
- Order: Anura
- Family: Rhacophoridae
- Genus: Philautus
- Species: P. kempii

Binomial name
- Philautus kempii (Annandale, 1912)

Synonyms
- Megalophrys kempii Annandale, 1912; Panophrys kempii (Annandale, 1912); Megophrys kempii (Annandale, 1912); Xenophrys kempii (Annandale, 1912); Aquixalus kempii (Annandale, 1912); Liuixalus kempii (Annandale, 1912)

= Philautus kempii =

Species of frog

Philautus kempii (not to be confused with Philautus kempiae) is a species of frog in the family Rhacophoridae. It is known with certainty from its type locality, Upper Rotung in Arunachal Pradesh, Northeast India, in the area also claimed by China. It is also reported from Arunachal Pradesh in general as well as from extreme eastern Tibet; these might represent another species. Very little is known about this species, and even its taxonomic validity remains uncertain.

== Etymology and common names ==
The specific name kempii honours Stanley Wells Kemp, an English zoologist and anthropologist. Common names Kemp's spadefoot toad, Kemp's horned toad, Kemp's bush frog, and Kemp's small treefrog have been coined for it (only the latter two accord with the current placement of this species in Rhacophoridae).

== Taxonomy and systematics ==
Philautus kempii was originally described by Nelson Annandale as Megalophrys (=Megophrys) kempii, in a genus that is now in the family Megophryidae. Later authors placed the taxon in various megophryid genera. However, in 2006 Delorme and colleagues noted that the holotype has granular belly and distinct finger and toe discs, characteristics that are not present in Megophryidae. Instead, they concluded that Annandale's Megalophrys kempii is a rhacophorid, likely in the genus Philautus. It has also been placed in other rhacophorid genera.

== Description ==
The holotype measures 15 mm (0.6 in) in snout–vent length and is at least a sub-adult. The snout is relatively long and sloping forwards, round, and truncate in profile. The tympanum is distinct. The limbs are slender. The fingers and toes bear small but distinct discs. The toes have basal webbing. Skin is smooth except for the belly. The dorsum (in preservative) is dark olive and has symmetrically arranged greyish-green marks. The snout is also greyish-green. The hind limbs have obscure cross-bands. The ventral surfaces are yellowish.

== Habitat and conservation ==
Presumably, this species inhabits tropical moist forest, but nothing definite is known regarding its habitats and biology. Threats and its presence in protected areas are unknown.
