= Philautus juliandringi =

Conservation status
- Near Threatened (IUCN 3.1)

Scientific classification
- Kingdom: Animalia
- Phylum: Chordata
- Class: Amphibia
- Order: Anura
- Family: Rhacophoridae
- Genus: Philautus
- Species: P. juliandringi

Binomial name
- Philautus juliandringi Dehling, 2010

Species of frog

Philautus juliandringi is a species of frog in the family Rhacophoridae. It is endemic to Malaysia, where it has been observed in Gunung Mulu National Park between 700 and 2000 meters above sea level.

This frog is arboreal, dwelling in limestone forests andscrub. Scientists believe this frog develops in pitcher plants, but this has yet to be confirmed.

Scientists say this frog is near threatened but not truly endangered because one of the places it lives is a protected park.

== Original publication ==
- Dehling JM (2010). "A new bush frog (Anura: Rhacophoridae: Pilautus) from Gunung Mulu National Park, East Malaysia (Borneo)". Salamandra. 46: 63–72.
