= Philautus surdus =

Conservation status
- Least Concern (IUCN 3.1)

Scientific classification
- Kingdom: Animalia
- Phylum: Chordata
- Class: Amphibia
- Order: Anura
- Family: Rhacophoridae
- Genus: Philautus
- Species: P. surdus

Binomial name
- Philautus surdus (Peters, 1863)

Synonyms
- Polypedates surdus Peters, 1863; Philautus williamsi Taylor, 1922; Rhacophorus lissobrachius Inger, 1954

Species of frog

Philautus surdus is a species of frog in the family Rhacophoridae. It is endemic to the Philippines and found on Bohol, Mindanao, Luzon, and Polillo islands. usually higher than 650 meters above sea level. Its natural habitats are lower montane and lowland forests, and it can also occur in some disturbed areas adjacent to forests. It is an arboreal species and one of the most common Philippine frogs inhabiting forests.
