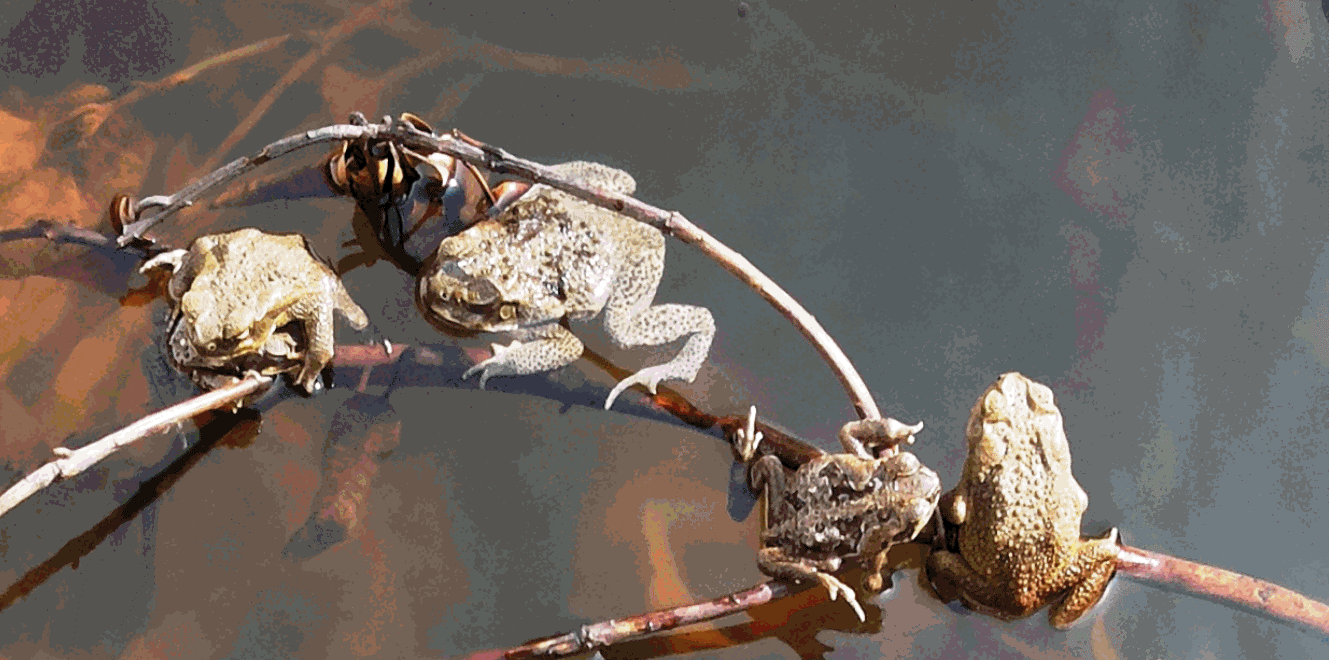

Conservation status
- Endangered (IUCN 3.1)

Scientific classification
- Kingdom: Animalia
- Phylum: Chordata
- Class: Amphibia
- Order: Anura
- Family: Rhacophoridae
- Genus: Philautus
- Species: P. schmackeri

Binomial name
- Philautus schmackeri (Boettger, 1892)

Synonyms
- Ixalus mindorensis Boulenger, 1897; Ixalus schmackeri Boettger, 1892; Philautus mindorensis (Boulenger, 1897); Rhacophorus mindorensis (Boulenger, 1897); Rhacophorus schmackeri (Boettger, 1892)

= Mindoro tree frog =

Species of amphibian

The Mindoro tree frog (Philautus schmackeri) is a species of frog in the family Rhacophoridae. It is endemic to the Philippines.

Its natural habitats are subtropical or tropical moist lowland forests, subtropical or tropical moist montane forests, and subtropical or tropical moist shrubland. It is threatened by habitat loss.
