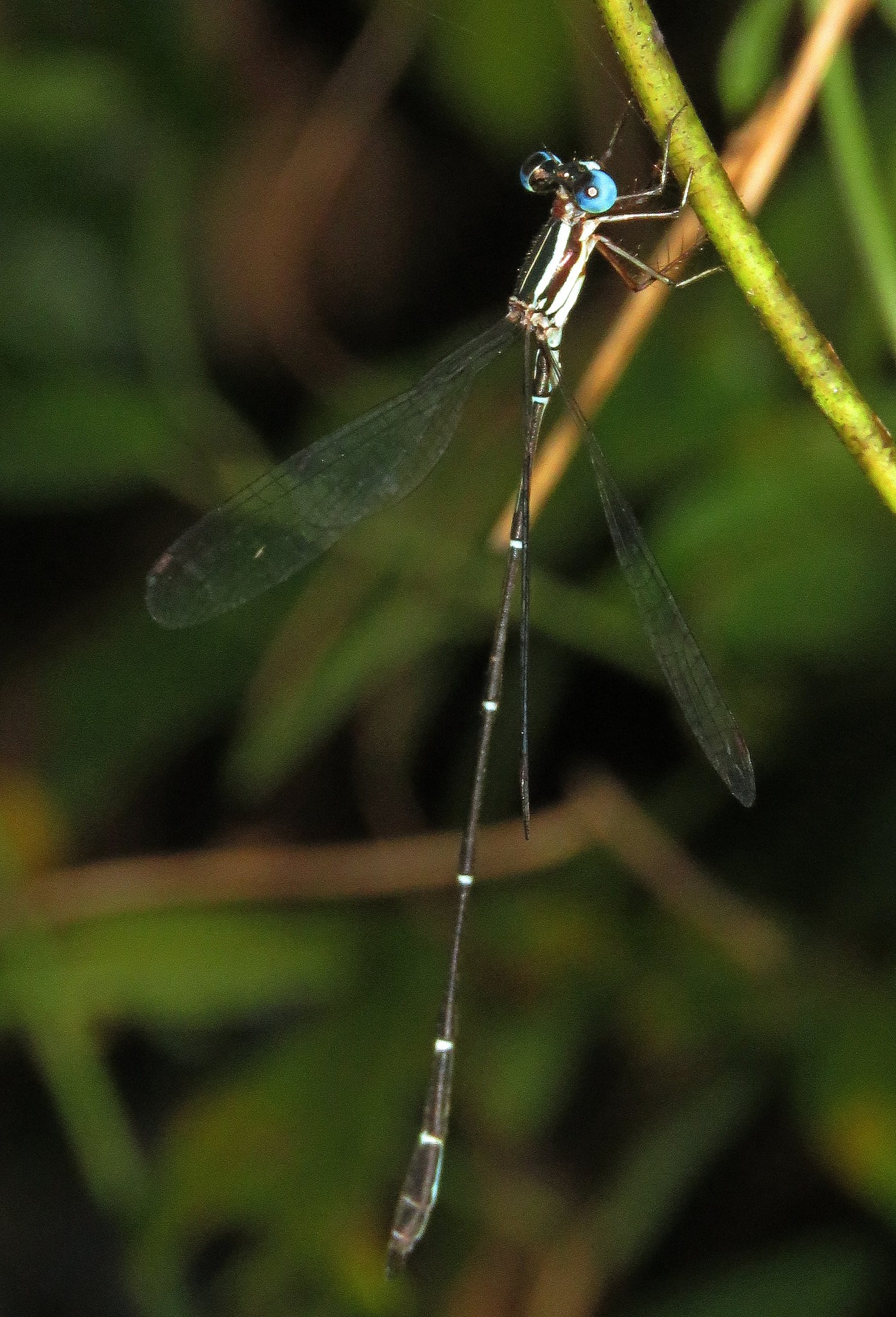
- Perilestes solutus

Scientific classification
- Kingdom: Animalia
- Phylum: Arthropoda
- Clade: Pancrustacea
- Class: Insecta
- Order: Odonata
- Suborder: Zygoptera
- Family: Perilestidae
- Genus: Perilestes; Hagen, 1862

= Perilestes =

Genus of damselflies

Perilestes is a genus of damselflies in the family Perilestidae. There are nine species described in the genus Perilestes.

== Description ==
Species of Perilestes are slender forest damselflies with very long, narrow abdomens and comparatively short wings. Their twig-like appearance has led to the common names "shortwings" and "twigtails" used for members of the family Perilestidae.

== Distribution and habitat ==
Species of Perilestes occur in the tropical regions of the Americas, where they inhabit shaded forests and forest streams.

== Species ==
The following species are currently placed in Perilestes:

- Perilestes attenuatus Selys, 1886
- Perilestes bispinus Kimmins, 1958
- Perilestes eustaquioi Machado, 2015
- Perilestes fragilis Hagen in Selys, 1862
- Perilestes gracillimus Kennedy, 1941
- Perilestes jeuni Mendoza-Penagos & Vilela, 2022
- Perilestes kahli Williamson & Williamson, 1924
- Perilestes minor Williamson & Williamson, 1924
- Perilestes solutus Williamson & Williamson, 1924
