= Philautus maosonensis =

Conservation status
- Data Deficient (IUCN 3.1)

Scientific classification
- Kingdom: Animalia
- Phylum: Chordata
- Class: Amphibia
- Order: Anura
- Family: Rhacophoridae
- Genus: Philautus
- Species: P. maosonensis

Binomial name
- Philautus maosonensis Bourret, 1937

Species of frog

Philautus maosonensis is a species of frog in the family Rhacophoridae. It is found in northern Vietnam and possibly nearby parts of China. Its natural habitats are subtropical or tropical moist lowland forests and subtropical or tropical moist montane forests.People have seen it between 400 and 1500 meters above sea level. It is threatened by habitat loss.
