= Philautus vermiculatus =

Conservation status
- Least Concern (IUCN 3.1)

Scientific classification
- Kingdom: Animalia
- Phylum: Chordata
- Class: Amphibia
- Order: Anura
- Family: Rhacophoridae
- Genus: Philautus
- Species: P. vermiculatus

Binomial name
- Philautus vermiculatus (Boulenger, 1900)

Synonyms
- Ixalus brevipes Boulenger, 1908

Species of frog

Philautus vermiculatus is a species of frog in the family Rhacophoridae. It is found in Malaysia and Thailand. It has been observed between 500 and 1600 meters above sea level.

Scientists classify this frog as least concern of extinction because of its large range and presumed large population, but it is subject to habitat loss.
