= Philautus polymorphus =

Scientific classification
- Kingdom: Animalia
- Phylum: Chordata
- Class: Amphibia
- Order: Anura
- Family: Rhacophoridae
- Genus: Philautus
- Species: P. polymorphus

Binomial name
- Philautus polymorphus Wostl, Riyanto, Hamidy, Kurniawan, Smith, and Harvey, 2017

Species of frog

Philautus polymorphus is a species of frog in the family Rhacophoridae. It is endemic to Indonesia. It has been observed between 1337 and 2204 meters above sea level in Sumatra.

== Original description ==
- Wostl E; Riyanto A; Hamidy A; Kurniawan N; Smith EN; Harvey MB (2017). "A taxonomic revision of the Philautus (Anura: Rhacophoridae) of Sumatra with the description of four new species". Herpetological Monographs (Abstract). 31 (1): 98–141. doi:10.1655/HERPMONOGRAPHS-D-16-00007.
