= Philautus kerangae =

Conservation status
- Vulnerable (IUCN 3.1)

Scientific classification
- Kingdom: Animalia
- Phylum: Chordata
- Class: Amphibia
- Order: Anura
- Family: Rhacophoridae
- Genus: Philautus
- Species: P. kerangae

Binomial name
- Philautus kerangae Dring, 1987

Species of frog

Philautus kerangae is a species of frog in the family Rhacophoridae. It is found in Malaysia, possibly Brunei, and possibly Indonesia. It has been observed it as high as 1200 meters above sea level in the forests of northern Sarawak, 200 meters above sea level in southeastern Sarawak, and 790 meters above sea level in Sumatra. Its natural habitats are subtropical or tropical moist lowland forests and swamps. It is threatened by habitat loss.
