= Philautus disgregus =

Conservation status
- Near Threatened (IUCN 3.1)

Scientific classification
- Kingdom: Animalia
- Phylum: Chordata
- Class: Amphibia
- Order: Anura
- Family: Rhacophoridae
- Genus: Philautus
- Species: P. disgregus

Binomial name
- Philautus disgregus Inger, 1989

Species of frog

Philautus disgregus, the disparate bubble-nest frog, or Malaysian bubble-nest frog is a species of frog in the family Rhacophoridae. It is endemic to Malaysia, where it has been observed as high as 300 meters above sea level.

Its natural habitat is subtropical or tropical moist lowland forests. It is threatened by habitat loss.
