= Philautus refugii =

Conservation status
- Vulnerable (IUCN 3.1)

Scientific classification
- Kingdom: Animalia
- Phylum: Chordata
- Class: Amphibia
- Order: Anura
- Family: Rhacophoridae
- Genus: Philautus
- Species: P. refugii

Binomial name
- Philautus refugii Inger & Stuebing, 1996

Species of frog

Philautus refugii is a species of frog in the family Rhacophoridae. It is found in Malaysia and possibly Indonesia. Its natural habitat is subtropical or tropical moist lowland forests. It has been observed in two different places, one 840 metres above sea level and one between 900 and 1490 metres above sea level.

This frog is classified as vulnerable to extinction because of habitat loss attributable to logging and the conversion of forest to palm oil plantations.

The adult male frog measures about 18–22 mm in snout-vent length, and the adult female frog is about 18–20 mm long. This frog has been observed on shrub plants. Male frogs sit about 2 meters above the ground and call to the female frogs. This frog undergoes direct development, hatching as a froglet with no free-swimming tadpole stage.
