= Philautus saueri =

Conservation status
- Least Concern (IUCN 3.1)

Scientific classification
- Kingdom: Animalia
- Phylum: Chordata
- Class: Amphibia
- Order: Anura
- Family: Rhacophoridae
- Genus: Philautus
- Species: P. saueri

Binomial name
- Philautus saueri Malkmus & Riede, 1996

Species of frog

Philautus saueri is a species of frog in the family Rhacophoridae. It is endemic to Malaysia, where it has been observed near Pakka Cave and near Mount Kinabalu, between 2200 and 3500 meters above sea level.

This frog is listed as Least Concern because, even though its confirmed range is small, most of it is inside protected parks. Its natural habitat is subtropical or tropical moist montane forests.

Scientists have seen this frog's eggs and young inside the water in pitcher plants.
