= Philautus abditus =

Conservation status
- Least Concern (IUCN 3.1)

Scientific classification
- Kingdom: Animalia
- Phylum: Chordata
- Class: Amphibia
- Order: Anura
- Family: Rhacophoridae
- Genus: Philautus
- Species: P. abditus

Binomial name
- Philautus abditus Inger, Orlov, and Darevsky, 1999

Species of frog

Philautus abditus is a species of frog in the family Rhacophoridae. It is found in the highlands of central Vietnam (Kon Tum and Gia Lai Provinces) as well as in extreme northeastern Cambodia (Ratanakiri Province). The specific name abditus is Latin for "hidden" or "concealed" and refers to the black spots on the legs that are concealed while the legs are flexed.

== Description ==
Adult males measure 26–28 mm (1.0–1.1 in) and adult females 27–30 mm (1.1–1.2 in) in snout–vent length. The overall appearance is stocky. The snout is rounded. The tympanum is present but completely hidden by skin; the supratympanic fold is weakly curved. The fingers and toes bear round discs; the toes are extensively webbed. Skin is smooth dorsally and laterally but granular ventrally. Preserved specimens are dorsally pinkish brown or gray. The anterior and the posterior surfaces of the thighs bear large, black spots that are not visible when the legs are flexed. Males have a median vocal sac.

== Habitat and conservation ==
Philautus abditus occurs in shrubs and grassy vegetation in evergreen and semi-evergreen forests at elevations of 674–750 m (2,211–2,461 ft) above sea level. Reproduction is probably direct (i.e., there is no free-living larval stage). This species is potentially threatened by forest and stream degradation. The Cambodian locality is within the Virachey National Park.
