= Philautus namdaphaensis =

Conservation status
- Vulnerable (IUCN 3.1)

Scientific classification
- Kingdom: Animalia
- Phylum: Chordata
- Class: Amphibia
- Order: Anura
- Family: Rhacophoridae
- Genus: Philautus
- Species: P. namdaphaensis

Binomial name
- Philautus namdaphaensis Sarkar & Sanyal, 1985

Species of frog

Philautus namdaphaensis, the Tirap bubble-nest frog, Namdapha bush frog, or Namdapha shrub frog is a species of frog in the family Rhacophoridae. It is found in India and possibly Myanmar. Its natural habitats are subtropical or tropical moist lowland forests and subtropical or tropical moist shrubland. It is threatened by habitat loss.

== Original description ==
- Sarkar, A. K.; D. P. Sanyal (1985). "Amphibia". Records of the Zoological Survey of India. 81: 285–295.
