= Philautus acutus =

Conservation status
- Least Concern (IUCN 3.1)

Scientific classification
- Kingdom: Animalia
- Phylum: Chordata
- Class: Amphibia
- Order: Anura
- Family: Rhacophoridae
- Genus: Philautus
- Species: P. acutus

Binomial name
- Philautus acutus Dring, 1987

Species of frog

Philautus acutus is a species of frog in the family Rhacophoridae. It is found in Malaysia and possibly Brunei. Its natural habitat is subtropical or tropical moist montane forests. It has been observed 300 meters above sea level in Gunung Mulu National Park.
