= Philautus macroscelis =

Conservation status
- Least Concern (IUCN 3.1)

Scientific classification
- Kingdom: Animalia
- Phylum: Chordata
- Class: Amphibia
- Order: Anura
- Family: Rhacophoridae
- Genus: Philautus
- Species: P. macroscelis

Binomial name
- Philautus macroscelis (Boulenger, 1896)

Synonyms
- Rhacophorus macroscelis Boulenger, 1896; Philautus spiculatus Smith, 1931; Rhacophorus (Rhacophorus) everetti Ahl, 1931; Rhacophorus (Rhacophorus) macroscelis Ahl, 1931; Philautus spiculosus Smith, 1931; Rhacophorus spiculatus Inger, 1954; Rhacophorus everetti macroscelis Inger, 1954

Species of frog

Philautus macroscelis, the mossy bush frog, is a species of frog in the family Rhacophoridae. It is endemic to Brunei, Malaysia, and Borneo. It is suspected in Indonesia. It has been observed between 750 and 1800 meters above sea level.

Philautus macroscelis is a newly discovered species of bush frog, distinguished by its distinct physical features, including particular proportions of limbs and body that assist in its identification. Its conservation status raises concerns due to its restricted range and potential susceptibility to habitat destruction in Borneo.

== Original description ==
- Hertwig ST; Das I; Schweizer M; Brown R; Haas A (October 20, 2011). "Phylogenetic relationships of the Rhacophorus everetti-group and implications for the evolution of reproductive modes in Philautus (Amphibia: Anura: Rhacophoridae)". Zoologica Scripta (Abstract). 41: 29–46. doi:10.1111/j.1463-6409.2011.00499.x.
