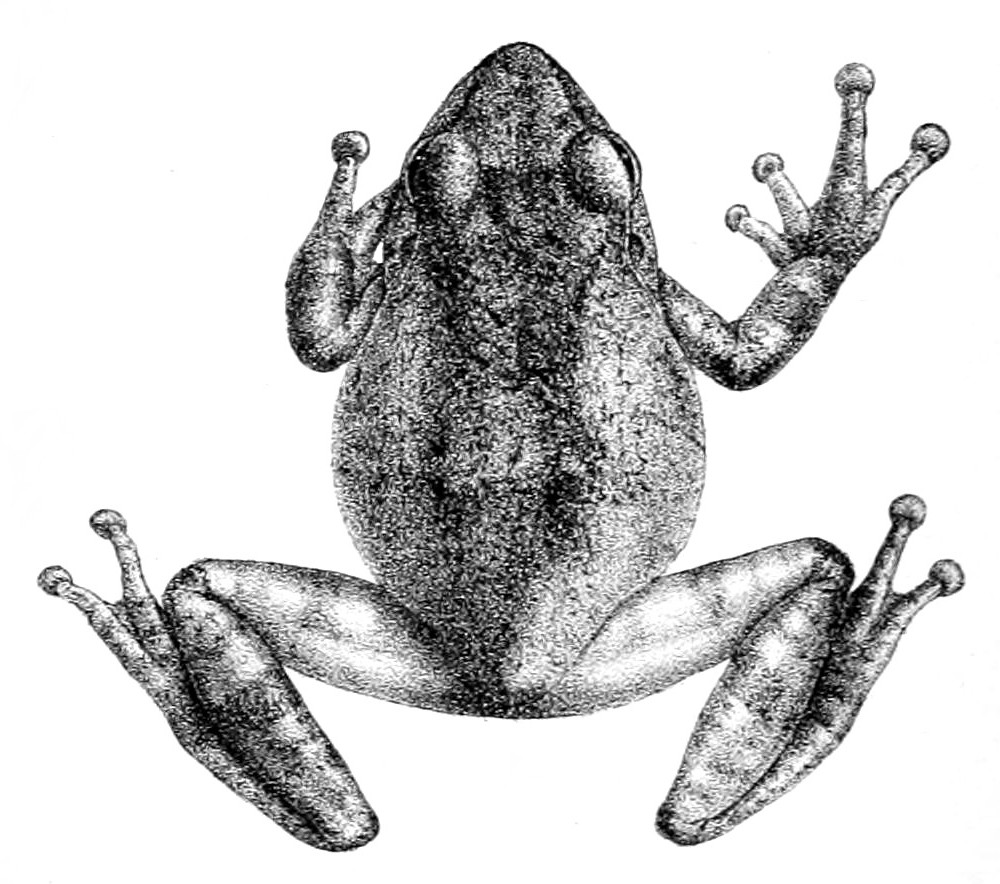

Conservation status
- Data Deficient (IUCN 3.1)

Scientific classification
- Kingdom: Animalia
- Phylum: Chordata
- Class: Amphibia
- Order: Anura
- Family: Rhacophoridae
- Genus: Philautus
- Species: P. dubius

Binomial name
- Philautus dubius (Boulenger, 1882)

Synonyms
- Ixalus jerdonii Günther, 1876

= Philautus dubius =

Species of frog

Philautus dubius is a species of frog in the family Rhacophoridae. It is endemic to India.
