= Philautus thamyridion =

Scientific classification
- Kingdom: Animalia
- Phylum: Chordata
- Class: Amphibia
- Order: Anura
- Family: Rhacophoridae
- Genus: Philautus
- Species: P. thamyridion

Binomial name
- Philautus thamyridion Wostl, Riyanto, Hamidy, Kurniawan, Smith, and Harvey, 2017

Species of frog in the family Rhacophoridae

Philautus thamyridion is a species of frog in the family Rhacophoridae. It is endemic to Indonesia. It has been observed between 911 and 1946 meters above sea level in Sumatra.

== Original publication ==
- Wostl E; Riyanto A; Hamidy A; Kurniawan N; Smith EN; Harvey MB (2017). "A taxonomic revision of the Philautus (Anura: Rhacophoridae) of Sumatra with the description of four new species". Herpetological Monographs (Abstract). 31 (1): 98–141. doi:10.1655/HERPMONOGRAPHS-D-16-00007.
