= Philautus erythrophthalmus =

Conservation status
- Endangered (IUCN 3.1)

Scientific classification
- Kingdom: Animalia
- Phylum: Chordata
- Class: Amphibia
- Order: Anura
- Family: Rhacophoridae
- Genus: Philautus
- Species: P. erythrophthalmus

Binomial name
- Philautus erythrophthalmus Stuebing & Wong, 2000

Species of frog

Philautus erythrophthalmus is a species of frog in the family Rhacophoridae. It is endemic to Malaysia. People have seen it between 1,000 and 1,550 metres (3,280 and 5,090 ft) above sea level.

This frog lives in oak forests, but scientists have observed at least one specimen in a logged area.

Scientists believe this frog may reproduce by direct development, like many related species do, but this has not been confirmed.

This frog is endangered because of deforestation associated with agriculture, especially palm oil, logging.
