= Philautus pallidipes =

Conservation status
- Least Concern (IUCN 3.1)

Scientific classification
- Kingdom: Animalia
- Phylum: Chordata
- Class: Amphibia
- Order: Anura
- Family: Rhacophoridae
- Genus: Philautus
- Species: P. pallidipes

Binomial name
- Philautus pallidipes (Barbour, 1908)

Species of frog

Philautus pallidipes is a species of frog in the family Rhacophoridae. It is endemic to West Java, Indonesia.

Its natural habitat is subtropical or tropical moist montane forests. It has only been observed higher than 1000 meters above sea level.

It is threatened by habitat loss.
