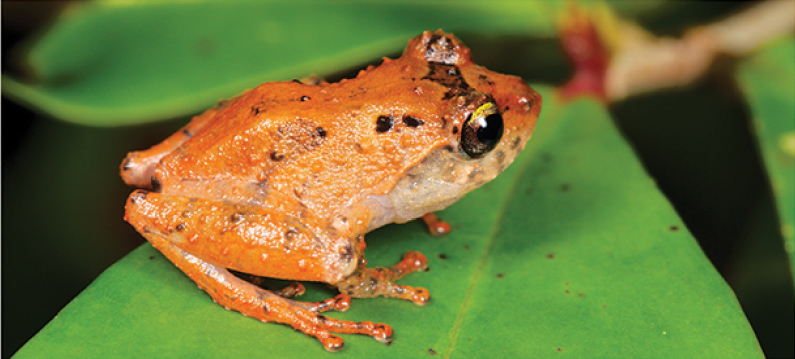

Conservation status
- Least Concern (IUCN 3.1)

Scientific classification
- Kingdom: Animalia
- Phylum: Chordata
- Class: Amphibia
- Order: Anura
- Family: Rhacophoridae
- Genus: Philautus
- Species: P. nephophilus

Binomial name
- Philautus nephophilus Dehling, Matsui, and Yambun Imbun, 2016

= Philautus nephophilus =

Species of frog

Philautus nephophilus is a species of frog in the family Rhacophoridae. It is endemic to Malaysia, where it has been observed in Kinabalu National Park, between 1400 and 1800 meters above sea level.

This frog has been found in primary forest and near the edges of forests.

Scientists have not classified this frog as threatened because even though it has a small range, that range includes a well-managed park.

The adult male frog measures 16.4–18.6 mm in snout-vent length and the adult female frog 20.3–23.1 mm. This frog can change color, being darker during the day, with a yellow belly and dark brown spots. At night, this frog's head and shoulders are deeper brown than the rest of the body. The sides of the back legs are gray in color with whitish spots or other marks. The skin around the tympanum is yellow in color. The iris of the eye is red in color, with horizontal pupils. This frog has teeth in its upper jaw. Its tongue is long and wide. All four legs are thin.

== Naming ==
The Greek word Nepho means 'cloud' while the word philus means 'loving'. The name refers to the rainforests it lives in.

== Lifestyle ==
Calling males form aggregations in lower vegetation and are found on leaves or twigs at heights between 0.3 and 3 m above the ground. Individual males can be spaced from each other by distances of less than one to several meters. Males start calling at dusk and continue until dawn. Calling activity appears to increase after rain and during light rain showers. Calling groups are not found in the immediate vicinity of open water bodies, and the species is presumed to have a direct development without a free-swimming tadpole stage, as is observed in other species of the genus.
