= Philautus worcesteri =

Conservation status
- Least Concern (IUCN 3.1)

Scientific classification
- Kingdom: Animalia
- Phylum: Chordata
- Class: Amphibia
- Order: Anura
- Family: Rhacophoridae
- Genus: Philautus
- Species: P. worcesteri

Binomial name
- Philautus worcesteri (Stejneger, 1905)

Synonyms
- Cornufer worcesteri Stejneger, 1905; Rhacophorus emembranatus Inger, 1954

Species of frog

Philautus worcesteri, the Mindanao bubble-nest frog, or smooth-skinned tree frog, is a species of frog in the family Rhacophoridae. It is endemic to the island of Mindanao in the Philippines.

Its natural habitats are lower montane and lowland forests, and it occurs also in slightly disturbed habitats. It is an arboreal species (found in trees). It is threatened by habitat loss caused by logging, agriculture, and infrastructure development.
