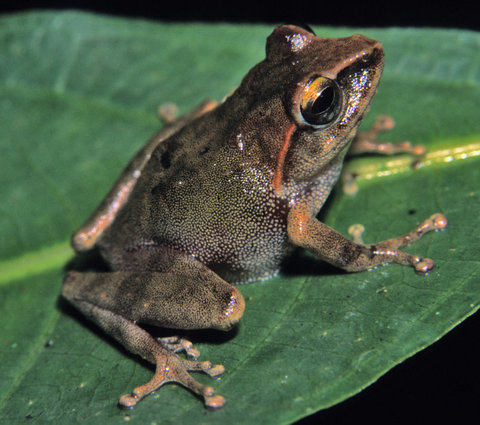

Conservation status
- Least Concern (IUCN 3.1)

Scientific classification
- Kingdom: Animalia
- Phylum: Chordata
- Class: Amphibia
- Order: Anura
- Family: Rhacophoridae
- Genus: Philautus
- Species: P. acutirostris

Binomial name
- Philautus acutirostris (Peters, 1867)

Synonyms
- Philautus basilanensis Taylor, 1922; Philautus woodi Stejneger, 1905

= Philautus acutirostris =

Species of frog

Philautus acutirostris is a species of frog in the family Rhacophoridae. It is endemic to the Philippines, where it has been observed in rainforests on the islands of Mindanao, Jolo and Basilan. Its natural habitats are subtropical or tropical moist lowland forests and subtropical or tropical moist montane forests. It is threatened by habitat loss.
