= Philautus amoenus =

Conservation status
- Least Concern (IUCN 3.1)

Scientific classification
- Kingdom: Animalia
- Phylum: Chordata
- Class: Amphibia
- Order: Anura
- Family: Rhacophoridae
- Genus: Philautus
- Species: P. amoenus

Binomial name
- Philautus amoenus Smith, 1931

Species of frog

Philautus amoenus is a species of frog in the family Rhacophoridae. It is endemic to northern Borneo and known from Mount Kinabalu, Sabah, Malaysia. It has been observed between 900 and 3000 meters above sea level.

Its natural habitats are submontane and montane forests. No direct threats to it have been identified, but its limited range makes it vulnerable to stochastic events.
