= Philautus longicrus =

Conservation status
- Vulnerable (IUCN 3.1)

Scientific classification
- Kingdom: Animalia
- Phylum: Chordata
- Class: Amphibia
- Order: Anura
- Family: Rhacophoridae
- Genus: Philautus
- Species: P. longicrus

Binomial name
- Philautus longicrus (Boulenger, 1894)

Species of frog

Philautus longicrus is a species of frog in the family Rhacophoridae. It is found in Indonesia, Malaysia, and the Philippines. In the Philippines, it has been observed between 30 and 1000 meters above sea level, and in Borneo, it has been observed between 700 and 2900 meters above sea level. Its natural habitats are subtropical or tropical moist lowland forests and subtropical or tropical moist montane forests. It is threatened by habitat loss.

== Redescription ==
- Bossuyt, F.; A. Dubois (2001). "A review of the frog genus Philautus Gistel, 1848 (Amphibia, Anura, Ranidae, Rhacophorinae)". Zeylanica (Full text). 6: 1–112.
