= Philautus cinerascens =

Conservation status
- Data Deficient (IUCN 3.1)

Scientific classification
- Kingdom: Animalia
- Phylum: Chordata
- Class: Amphibia
- Order: Anura
- Family: Rhacophoridae
- Genus: Philautus
- Species: P. cinerascens

Binomial name
- Philautus cinerascens (Stoliczka, 1870)

Species of frog

Philautus cinerascens is a species of frog in the family Rhacophoridae. It is endemic to Burma.
