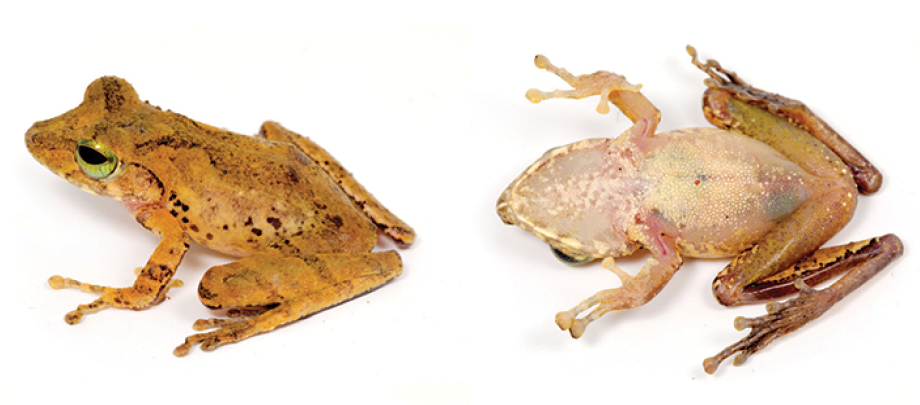

Conservation status
- Least Concern (IUCN 3.1)

Scientific classification
- Kingdom: Animalia
- Phylum: Chordata
- Class: Amphibia
- Order: Anura
- Family: Rhacophoridae
- Genus: Philautus
- Species: P. hosii

Binomial name
- Philautus hosii (Boulenger, 1895)

Synonyms
- Polypedates chlorophthalmus Das, 2005

= Philautus hosii =

Species of frog

Philautus hosii is a species of frog in the family Rhacophoridae. It is endemic to Borneo and has been found at 1,351 m (4,432 ft) above sea level. The specific name of the synonym, Polypedates chlorophthalmus, refers to its "remarkable green iris", from the Greek for "green-eyed". Accordingly, the common name green-eyed tree frog has been coined for the species.

Its natural habitat is subtropical or tropical moist lowland forests. It is threatened by habitat loss.

== Description ==
This species can be 62 mm (2.4 in) in snout–vent length. The body is elongate. The dorsum is brown, with a thin dark gray line at back of the forehead. The lower flanks and anterior edge of thighs have dark blotches. The throat has dark pigmentation. The tympanum is distinct. The iris is bright green and the toes are webbed but the fingers lack webbing.
