= Leyte tree frog =

Conservation status
- Least Concern (IUCN 3.1)

Scientific classification
- Kingdom: Animalia
- Phylum: Chordata
- Class: Amphibia
- Order: Anura
- Family: Rhacophoridae
- Genus: Philautus
- Species: P. leitensis

Binomial name
- Philautus leitensis (Boulenger, 1897)

Species of amphibian

The Leyte tree frog (Philautus leitensis) is a species of frog in the family Rhacophoridae. It is endemic to the Philippines.

Its natural habitats are subtropical or tropical moist lowland forests and subtropical or tropical moist montane forests.

This frog has a more pointed snout than other frogs in Philautus, and the nostrils are closer to the end of the snout than they are to the eyes. There is no webbed skin on the front feet and some webbed skin on the back feet. There is some brown color on the ventral sides of the legs.

Like other frogs in Philautus, this frog undergoes direct development, hatching from its eggs as small froglets with no free-swimming tadpole stage.

This frog is threatened by habitat loss. Scientists attribute this to increased urbanization, agriculture, pasturage, and logging.
