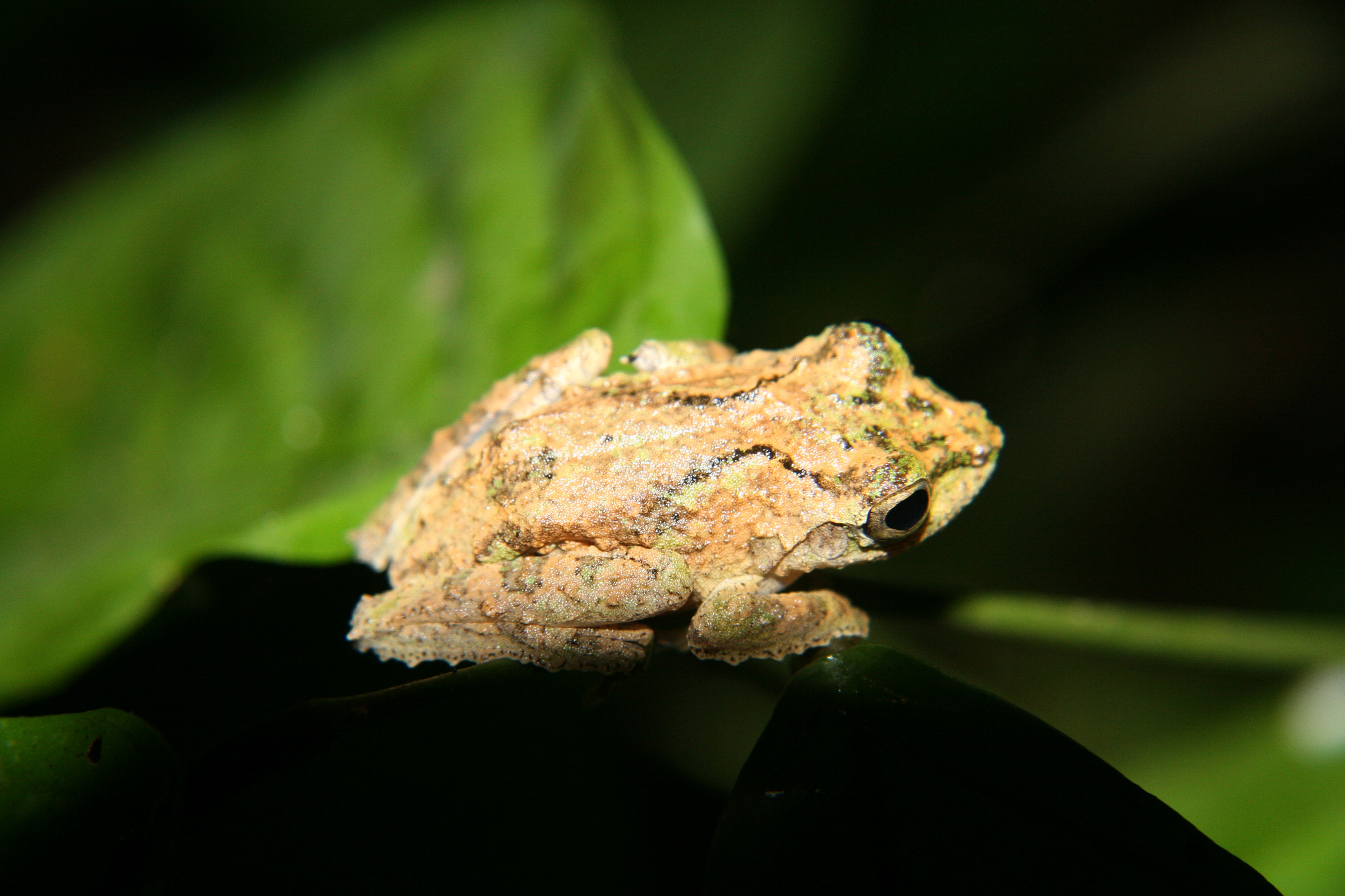

Conservation status
- Least Concern (IUCN 3.1)

Scientific classification
- Kingdom: Animalia
- Phylum: Chordata
- Class: Amphibia
- Order: Anura
- Family: Rhacophoridae
- Genus: Philautus
- Species: P. tectus

Binomial name
- Philautus tectus Dring, 1987

= Philautus tectus =

Species of frog

Philautus tectus is a species of frog in the family Rhacophoridae. It is found in Brunei and Malaysia. It has been observed 500 meters above sea level. Its natural habitat is subtropical or tropical moist lowland forests. It is threatened by habitat loss.
