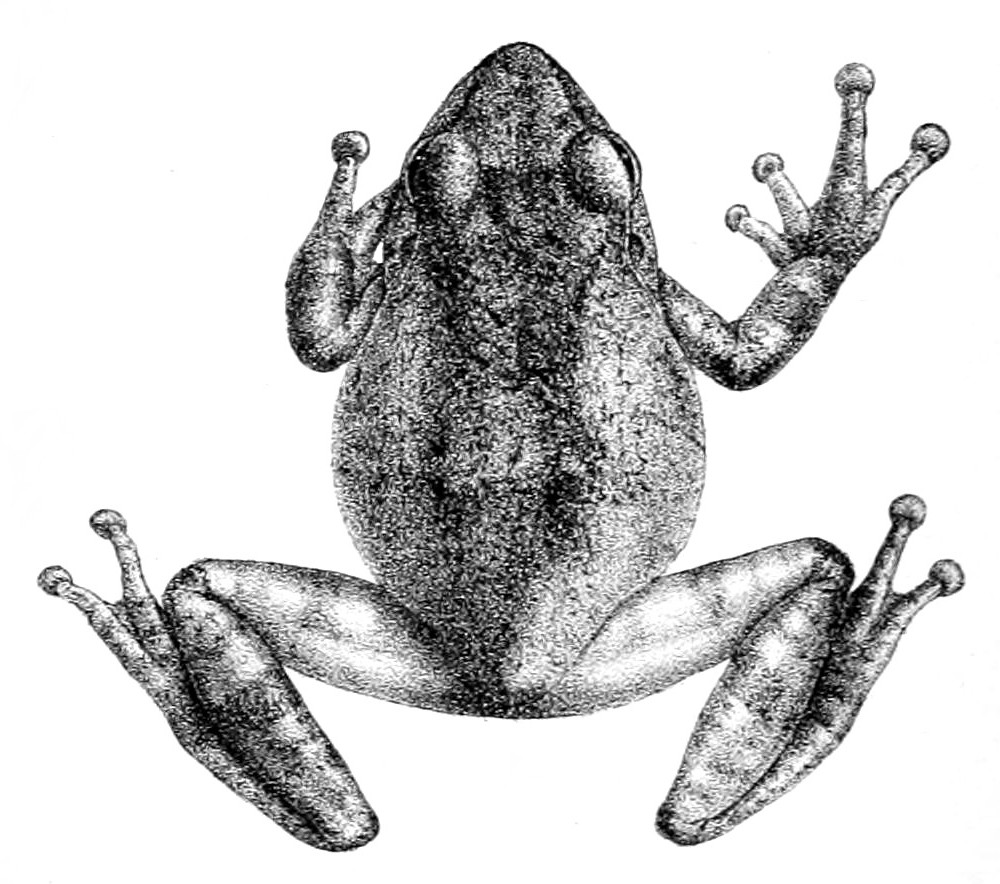
- Philautus dubius

Scientific classification
- Kingdom: Animalia
- Phylum: Chordata
- Class: Amphibia
- Order: Anura
- Superfamily: Ranoidea
- Family: Rhacophoridae
- Subfamily: Rhacophorinae
- Genus: Philautus; Gistel, 1848

Species
- See text

= Philautus =

Genus of amphibians

Philautus is a genus of shrub frogs in the family Rhacophoridae from Asia. Some species in this genus are now considered extinct by IUCN, while others are widespread and abundant (such as the recently described P. abundus, which was specifically named for this fact). The taxonomy of the group is unclear, with many poorly described species.

This genus is unique in that development is not direct, with all growth within the egg and no free-swimming tadpole stage. Some species have been found to bury their eggs in soil, although they are arboreal, and others attach their eggs to leaves.

== Revision ==
In 2009, researchers from the University of Delhi revised this genus after discovering and rediscovering numerous species in the forests of the Western Ghats.

== List of species ==
The following species are recognised in the genus Philautus:

- Philautus abditus Inger, Orlov, and Darevsky, 1999
- Philautus acutirostris (Peters, 1867)
- Philautus acutus Dring, 1987
- Philautus amabilis Wostl, Riyanto, Hamidy, Kurniawan, Smith, and Harvey, 2017
- Philautus amoenus Smith, 1931
- Philautus aurantium Inger, 1989
- Philautus aurifasciatus (Schlegel, 1837)
- Philautus bunitus Inger, Stuebing, and Tan, 1995
- Philautus cardamonus Ohler, Swan, and Daltry, 2002
- Philautus catbaensis Milto, Poyarkov, Orlov, and Nguyen, 2013
- Philautus cinerascens (Stoliczka, 1870)
- Philautus cornutus (Boulenger, 1920)
- Philautus davidlabangi Matsui, 2009
- Philautus disgregus Inger, 1989
- Philautus dubius (Boulenger, 1882)
- Philautus erythrophthalmus Stuebing and Wong, 2000
- Philautus everetti (Boulenger, 1894)
- Philautus garo (Boulenger, 1919)
- Philautus gunungensis Malkmus and Riede, 1996
- Philautus hosii (Boulenger, 1895)
- Philautus ingeri Dring, 1987
- Philautus jacobsoni (Van Kampen, 1912)
- Philautus juliandringi Dehling, 2010
- Philautus kakipanjang Dehling and Dehling, 2013
- Philautus kempiae (Boulenger, 1919)
- Philautus kempii (Annandale, 1912)
- Philautus kerangae Dring, 1987
- Philautus leitensis (Boulenger, 1897)
- Philautus longicrus (Boulenger, 1894)
- Philautus macroscelis (Boulenger, 1896)
- Philautus maosonensis Bourret, 1937
- Philautus microdiscus (Annandale, 1912)
- Philautus mjobergi Smith, 1925
- Philautus namdaphaensis Sarkar and Sanyal, 1985
- Philautus nephophilus Dehling, Matsui, and Yambun Imbun, 2016
- Philautus nepenthophilus Etter, Haas, Lee, Min, Das and Hertwig, 2021
- Philautus nianeae Stuart, Phimmachak, Seateun, and Sheridan, 2013
- Philautus pallidipes (Barbour, 1908)
- Philautus petersi (Boulenger, 1900)
- Philautus poecilius Brown and Alcala, 1994
- Philautus polymorphus Wostl, Riyanto, Hamidy, Kurniawan, Smith, and Harvey, 2017
- Philautus refugii Inger and Stuebing, 1996
- Philautus saueri Malkmus and Riede, 1996
- Philautus schmackeri (Boettger, 1892)
- Philautus surdus (Peters, 1863)
- Philautus surrufus Brown and Alcala, 1994
- Philautus tectus Dring, 1987
- Philautus thamyridion Wostl, Riyanto, Hamidy, Kurniawan, Smith, and Harvey, 2017
- Philautus tytthus Smith, 1940
- Philautus umbra Dring, 1987
- Philautus ventrimaculatus Wostl, Riyanto, Hamidy, Kurniawan, Smith, and Harvey, 2017
- Philautus vermiculatus (Boulenger, 1900)
- Philautus worcesteri (Stejneger, 1905)
