= Philautus nepenthophilus =

Scientific classification
- Kingdom: Animalia
- Phylum: Chordata
- Class: Amphibia
- Order: Anura
- Family: Rhacophoridae
- Genus: Philautus
- Species: P. nepenthophilus

Binomial name
- Philautus nepenthophilus Etter, Haas, Lee, Min, Das & Hertwig, 2021

Species of frog

Philautus nepenthophilus is a species of frog in the family Rhacophoridae. It is endemic to Malaysia.

== Naming ==
Nepenthophilus is composed of the word "nepenthes", referring to the genus of pitcher plants Nepenthes, more specifically Nepenthes mollis because they have a symbiotic relationship to these plants, while "philus" is a word from the Ancient Greek "φίλος" meaning "friend".

== Lifestyle ==
The frog prefers to live in tropical pitcher plants. They mainly live in symbiosis with Nepenthes mollis. The frog lays eggs inside the plant, the tadpoles only feed on the nutrients in their intestines, that's why their tadpoles only have a small mouth with no teeth. Both partners get an advantage: The frog gets shelter while the pitcher plant gets nutrients by the excretions of the tadpole. Even the adult frogs stay near the pitcher plants most of the time. The frog doesn't get hurt by the enzymes of the plant, the mechanism behind that is not completely understood.
