= Philautus gunungensis =

Conservation status
- Least Concern (IUCN 3.1)

Scientific classification
- Kingdom: Animalia
- Phylum: Chordata
- Class: Amphibia
- Order: Anura
- Family: Rhacophoridae
- Genus: Philautus
- Species: P. gunungensis

Binomial name
- Philautus gunungensis Malkmus and Riede, 1996

Synonyms
- Philautus aurantium gunungensis Malkmus and Riede, 1996

Species of frog

Philautus gunungensis is a species of frog in the family Rhacophoridae. It is endemic to the Mount Kinabalu region, in Sabah (Malaysia), Borneo.

Its natural habitat is tropical montane forest at around 1,400–1,500 m (4,600–4,900 ft) asl. There are no specific threats to it, and its known range is within the Kinabalu National Park. Nevertheless, its small range makes it vulnerable to stochastic events.

Scientists have observed this frog's eggs and young inside the water in pitcher plants.
