= Philautus nianeae =

Scientific classification
- Kingdom: Animalia
- Phylum: Chordata
- Class: Amphibia
- Order: Anura
- Family: Rhacophoridae
- Genus: Philautus
- Species: P. nianeae

Binomial name
- Philautus nianeae Stuart, Phimmachak, Seateun, and Sheridan, 2013

Species of frog

Philautus nianeae, the Laotian shrub frog, is a frog in the family Rhacophoridae. It is endemic to Laos. It has been observed between 471 and 979 meters above sea level.

This frog has smooth skin and black spots on the inner surfaces of its legs. It has light skin on its belly, with dark spots.
