= Philautus cornutus =

Conservation status
- Endangered (IUCN 3.1)

Scientific classification
- Kingdom: Animalia
- Phylum: Chordata
- Class: Amphibia
- Order: Anura
- Family: Rhacophoridae
- Genus: Philautus
- Species: P. cornutus

Binomial name
- Philautus cornutus (Boulenger, 1920)

Species of frog

Philautus cornutus is a species of frog in the family Rhacophoridae. It is endemic to Indonesia. It has been observed 1529 and 1907 meters above sea level.

== Appearance ==
Scientists collected some samples of this frog in 1920 and five more female frogs in 2013. These five female frogs had a snout-vent length of 24.0 – 25.8 mm.

The skin of the dorsum is purple-brown in color. Most of these frogs do not have marks or patterns on their backs, but some do. There are some dark marks on the legs. There is a black spot surrounding the vent. The skin of the ventrum is light brown in color. There are dark marks on the neck and chest. The iris of the eye is gold-orange on top with dark brown wedges.

== Life cycle ==
Like other frogs in Pseudophilautus, this frog undergoes direct development, hatching from its egg as a froglet with no free-swimming tadpole stage.

== Habitat and threats ==
Its natural habitats are subtropical or tropical moist lowland forests and subtropical or tropical moist montane forests.

It is threatened by habitat loss. Scientists attribute this to urbanization and logging.
