= Mottled tree frog =

Conservation status
- Least Concern (IUCN 3.1)

Scientific classification
- Kingdom: Animalia
- Phylum: Chordata
- Class: Amphibia
- Order: Anura
- Family: Rhacophoridae
- Genus: Philautus
- Species: P. poecilius

Binomial name
- Philautus poecilius Brown & Alcala, 1994

Synonyms
- Philautus poecilus Brown & Alcala, 1994 [orth. error]

Species of amphibian

The mottled tree frog (Philautus poecilius) is a species of frog in the family Rhacophoridae. It is endemic to the Philippines.It lives in mountain forests near Mount Hilonghilong. People have seen it between 1600 and 1900 meters above sea level.

This frog is not in endangered, but scientists note that its population is declining. Scientists attribute this to habitat loss associated with increased agriculture, mining, urbanization, and logging. Invasive species also pose some threat to this frog.
