= Philautus garo =

Conservation status
- Data Deficient (IUCN 3.1)

Scientific classification
- Kingdom: Animalia
- Phylum: Chordata
- Class: Amphibia
- Order: Anura
- Family: Rhacophoridae
- Genus: Philautus
- Species: P. garo

Binomial name
- Philautus garo (Boulenger, 1919)

Species of amphibian

Philautus garo is a species of frog in the family Rhacophoridae. It is endemic to India, and has been recorded in the Garo Hills of Assam and Meghalaya, and in Dzulake in Nagaland. This frog has been observed between 90 and 500 meters above sea level.

The adult frog measures about 13 mm in snout-vent length. There is no webbed skin on the front feet and partial webbing on the hind feet. The large climbing disks on the toes are roughly the size of the tympanum. The skin of the frog's back is gray with a dark brown mark between the eyes in the shape of an hourglass.

Its natural habitat is subtropical or tropical moist lowland forests. It is threatened by habitat loss.
