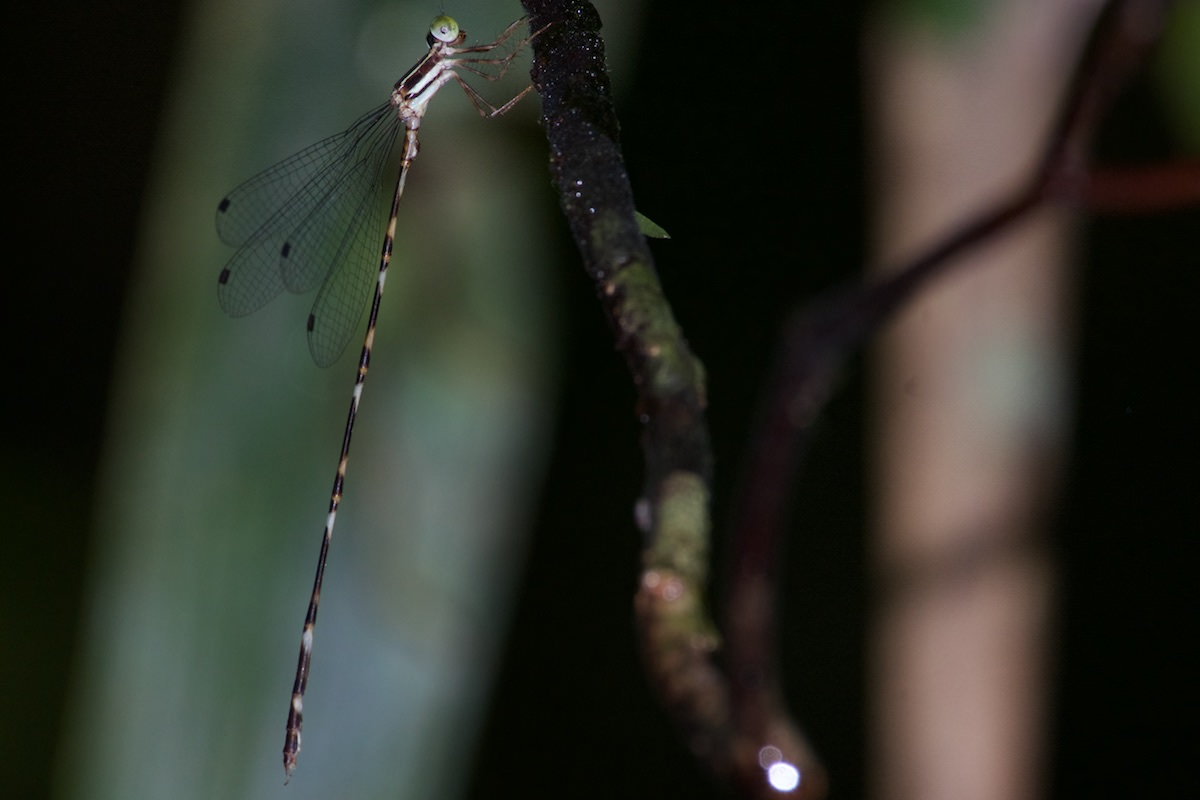
- Perissolestes guianensis

Scientific classification
- Kingdom: Animalia
- Phylum: Arthropoda
- Clade: Pancrustacea
- Class: Insecta
- Order: Odonata
- Suborder: Zygoptera
- Family: Perilestidae
- Genus: Perissolestes; Kennedy, 1941

= Perissolestes =

Genus of damselflies

Perissolestes is a genus of damselflies in the family Perilestidae. There are about 12 described species in Perissolestes.

== Species ==
These 12 species belong to the genus Perissolestes:

- Perissolestes aculeatus Kennedy, 1941
- Perissolestes castor (Kennedy, 1937)
- Perissolestes cornutus (Selys, 1886)
- Perissolestes flinti De Marmels, 1988
- Perissolestes guianensis (Williamson & Williamson, 1924)
- Perissolestes klugi Kennedy, 1941
- Perissolestes magdalenae (Williamson & Williamson, 1924)
- Perissolestes paprzyckii Kennedy, 1941
- Perissolestes pollux (Kennedy, 1937)
- Perissolestes remotus (Williamson & Williamson, 1924)
- Perissolestes remus Kennedy, 1941
- Perissolestes romulus Kennedy, 1941
