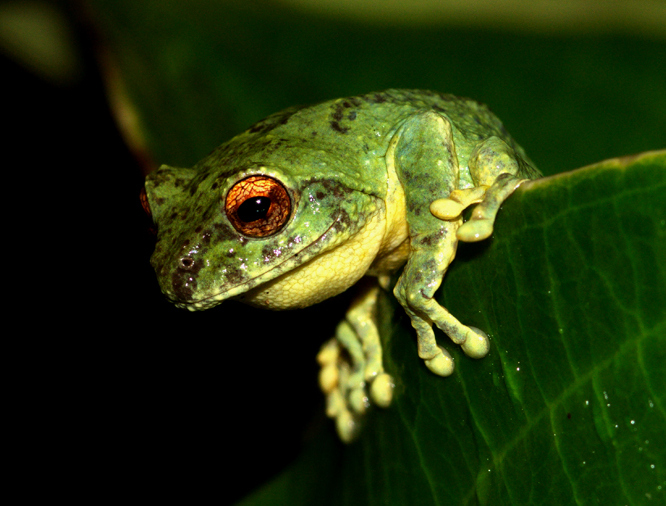
- Adult male on a leaf

Conservation status
- Least Concern (IUCN 3.1)

Scientific classification
- Kingdom: Animalia
- Phylum: Chordata
- Class: Amphibia
- Order: Anura
- Family: Rhacophoridae
- Genus: Philautus
- Species: P. bunitus

Binomial name
- Philautus bunitus Inger, Stuebing & Tan, 1995

= Philautus bunitus =

Species of frog

Philautus bunitus is a species of frog in the family Rhacophoridae. It is endemic to Malaysian Borneo and inhabits subtropical or tropical moist lowland forests and subtropical or tropical moist montane forests and is threatened by habitat loss.

== Description ==
Relatively large sized adults (SVL of male: up to 41 mm; female up to 46 mm). Stocky in habit. Finger tips with rounded discs. Webbing in the base of fingers rudimentary. Supratympanic fold distinct. Hind feet with moderate webbing. Toe tips with dilated discs. Skin sparsely granular on dorsum. Small spinular projections on upper eyelids. Ventral side granular. Coloration variable. Generally green with black spots or stripes. Venter uniformly lemon yellow turning bright orange towards the vent. Iris brownish with black vermiculations. Inner and outer sides of thigh and tarsus bright orange.

== Distribution, natural history and ecology ==
It occurs in Mount Kinabalu in western Sabah. It is restricted to elevations of 1000 to 1900 m amsl. It tends to perch 2–5 meters above ground level, so people tend to hear this frog rather that see it. In some areas, this frog is part of ecotourism.

Scientists believe this frog undergoes direct development with no free-swimming tadpole stage.
