= Kinabalu Park =

National park and UNESCO World Heritage Site in Malaysia

- IUCN category II (national park)
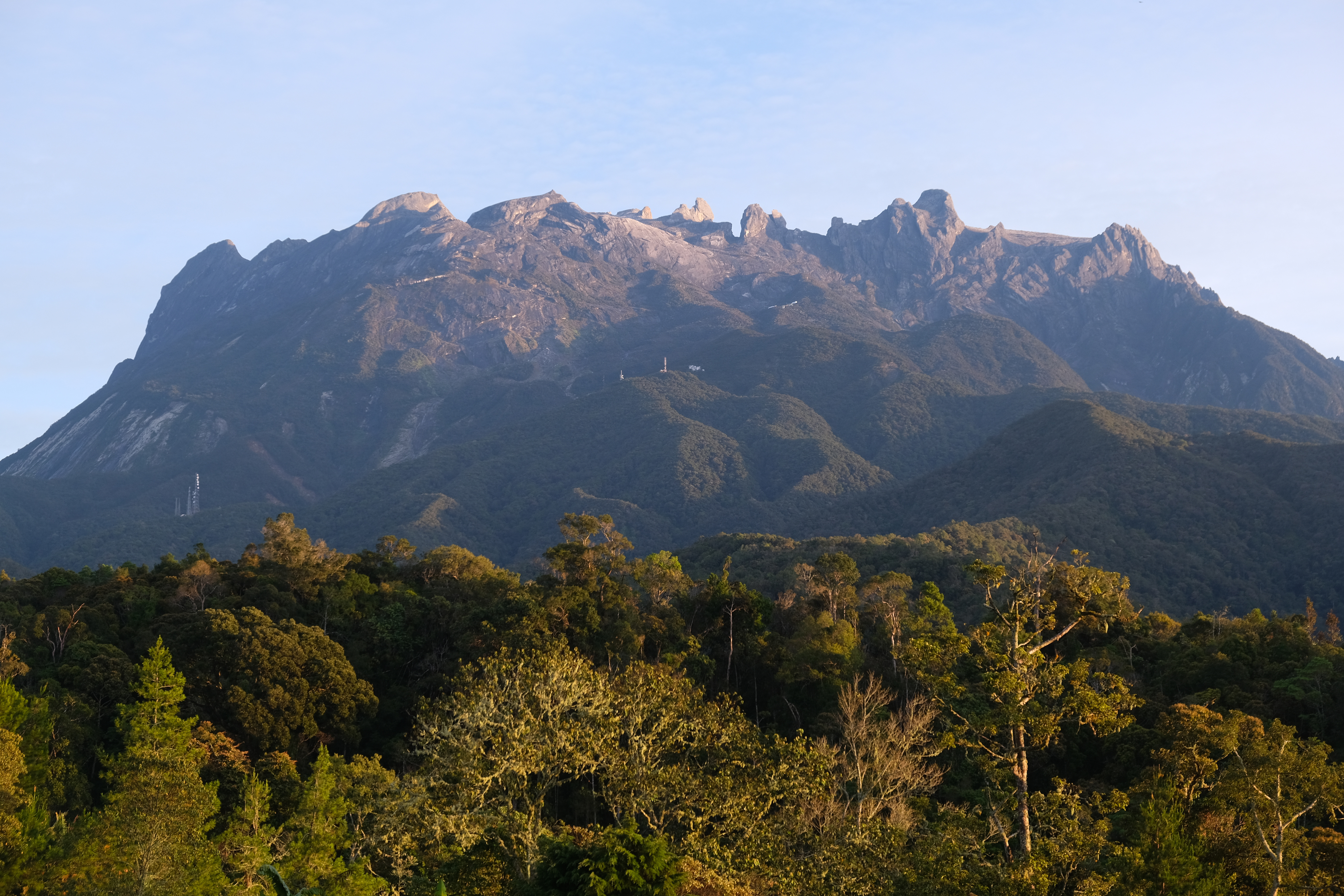

- Location within Malaysia
- Location: Sabah, Malaysia
- Nearest city: Kota Kinabalu, Tuaran (Tamparuli), Kota Belud, Ranau
- Coordinates: 6°09′N 116°39′E
- Area: 754 km^{2} (291 sq mi)
- Established: 1964
- Visitors: 611,624 (in 2010)
- Governing body: Sabah Parks

UNESCO World Heritage Site
- Official name: Kinabalu Park
- Type: Natural
- Criteria: ix, x
- Designated: 2000 (24th session)
- Reference no.: 1012
- Region: Asia-Pacific

Kinabalu Park (Malay: Taman Kinabalu), established as one of the first national parks of Malaysia in 1964, is Malaysia's first World Heritage Site designated by UNESCO in December 2000 for its "outstanding universal values" and the role as one of the most important biological sites in the world with more than 4,500 species of flora and fauna, including 326 bird and around 100 mammal species, and over 110 land snail species.

Located on the west coast of Sabah, Malaysian Borneo, it covers an area of 754 square kilometres surrounding Mount Kinabalu, which at 4,095.2 meters, is the highest mountain on the island of Borneo.

The park is one of the most popular tourist spots in Sabah and Malaysia in general. In 2010, the park received 611,624 visitors, including 47,613 climbers.

The site has been identified by UNESCO as a Centre of Plant Diversity for Southeast Asia, as it contains representatives from at least half of all Borneo’s plant species and is extremely rich in species with elements from China, Australia, the Himalayas, Malaysia and pan tropical floras.

== History ==
British colonial administrator and naturalist Hugh Low led an expedition from Tuaran to the region in 1851. He also became the first recorded man to reach the peak of Mount Kinabalu. The highest peak of the mountain was later named after him—Low's Peak.

The region was designated as a national park in 1964, a decision influenced by expeditions led by botanist E. J. H. Corner for the Royal Society in 1961 and 1964.

== Geography ==
Kinabalu Park is situated within the Crocker Range on the western coast of Sabah. It is in Ranau District, in West Coast Division. The park is not to be confused with Crocker Range National Park, a separate park to the south, in Interior Division.

The park headquarters is about 90 km (56 mi) from the city of Kota Kinabalu. There are sealed roads to the park headquarters from other parts of Sabah. The headquarters is situated on the southern boundary of Kinabalu Park, at an elevation of 1,563 m (5,128 ft). The northern boundary of Kinabalu Park is in Kota Marudu District, in Kudat Division. The district has two sub-stations, the Serinsim Substation (accessed by the Marak Parak Road) and the ranger outpost, Nalapak Substation, for which road access (near Federal Route 1) is rugged and mostly unpaved.

== Administration and park features ==
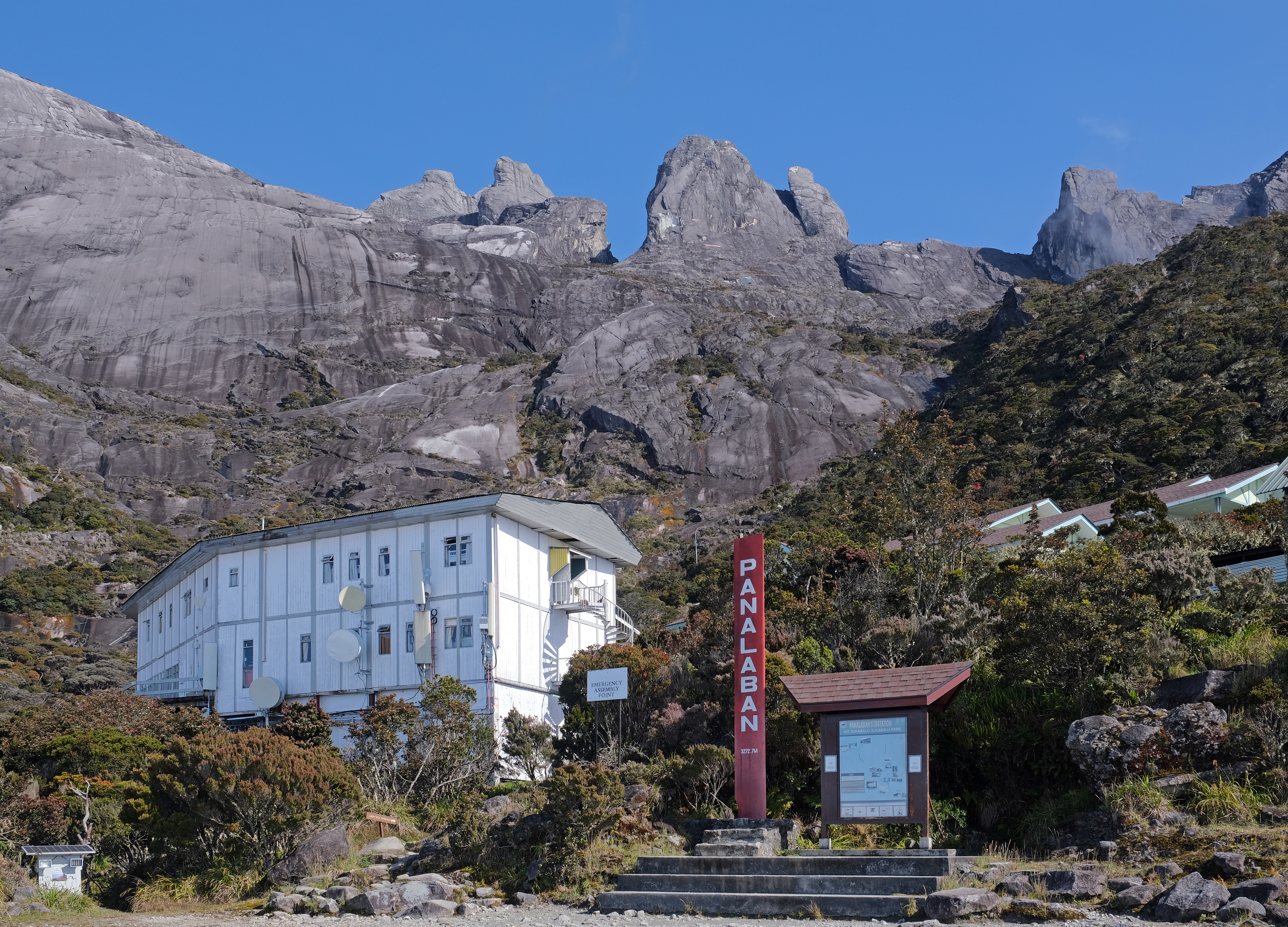
Laban Rata Resthouse at 3,270 m (10,730 ft)

This park is administered by an organisation called Sabah Parks. Accommodations in the form of chalets can be found in the park, mostly around the headquarters. Reservations for accommodation and mountain climbing guides are processed through Sutera Sanctuary Lodges, a private company. Every person who wishes to climb the mountain must be accompanied by a qualified guide. Sutera is now requiring hikers to stay one night at their lodge near the entrance, in addition to a required stay at Laban Rata. The cost to stay is considerably higher than at lodging just outside the park and includes a mandatory purchase of meals, etc.

The mountain summit trail begins at Timpohon. There is also an alternative route called the Mesilau Trail.

A notable feature of the park is Low's Gully. It is a 1.6-kilometer deep ravine stretching 10 kilometres on the side of the mountain peak.

== Ecology ==
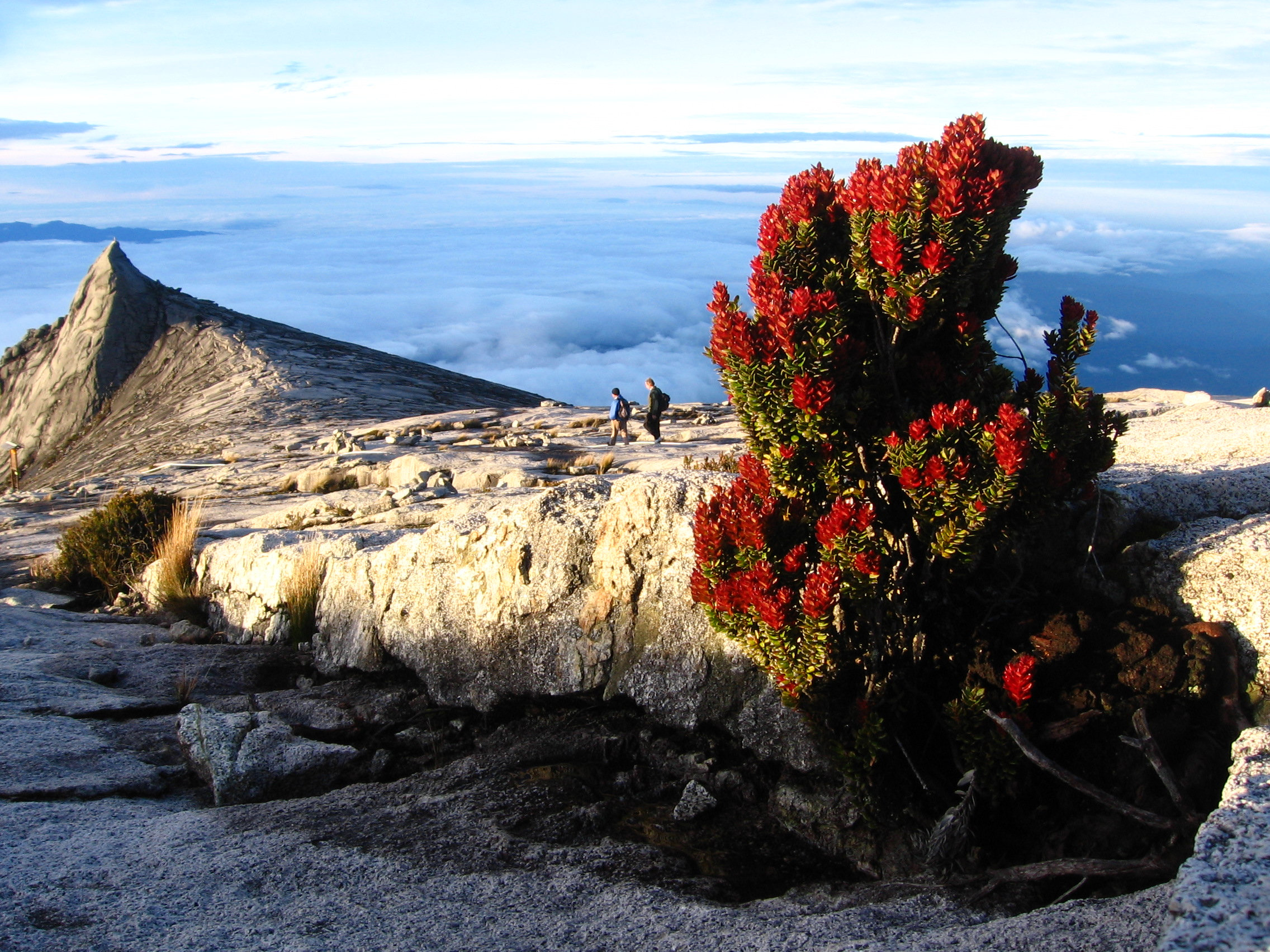
Vaccinium bush of the Mount Kinabalu summit plateau

This botanical site contains a variety of flora and fauna that ranges over 4 climate zones; from rich lowland dipterocarp forest through the montane oak, rhododendron, to the coniferous forests, to the alpine meadow plants, and to the stunted bushes of summit zone. The mountain is also known for its many carnivorous plant and orchid species, most notably Nepenthes rajah.

It is also home to a multitude of endemic animal species, including the Kinabalu giant red leech and Kinabalu giant earthworm. The park also plays host to a variety of birds, insects, mammals, amphibians, and reptiles.

Mount Kinabalu is one of the youngest non-volcanic mountains in the world. It was formed within the last 10 to 35 million years. The mountain still grows at a rate of 5 millimetres a year

== Gallery ==
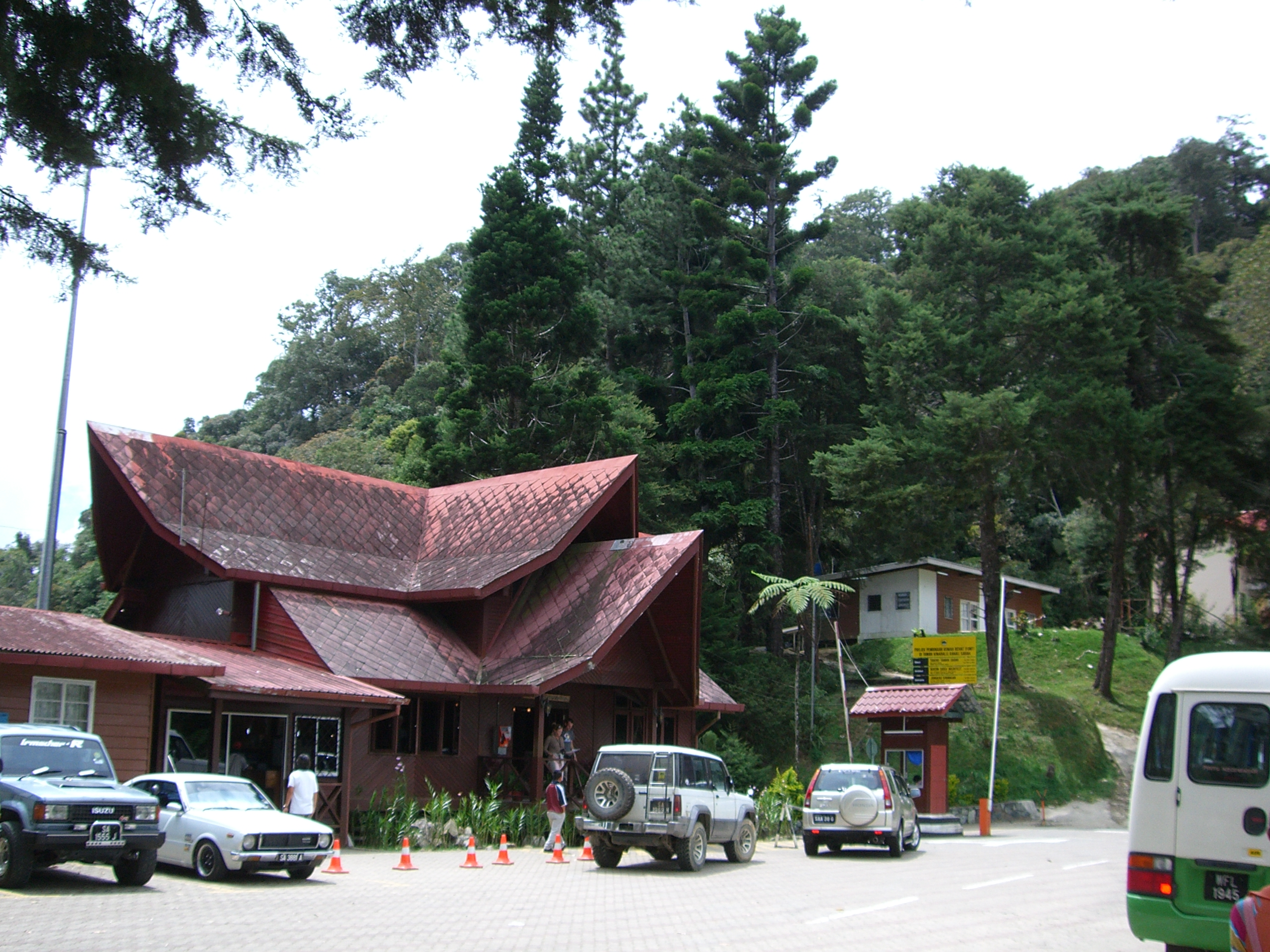
Kinabalu Park Headquarters

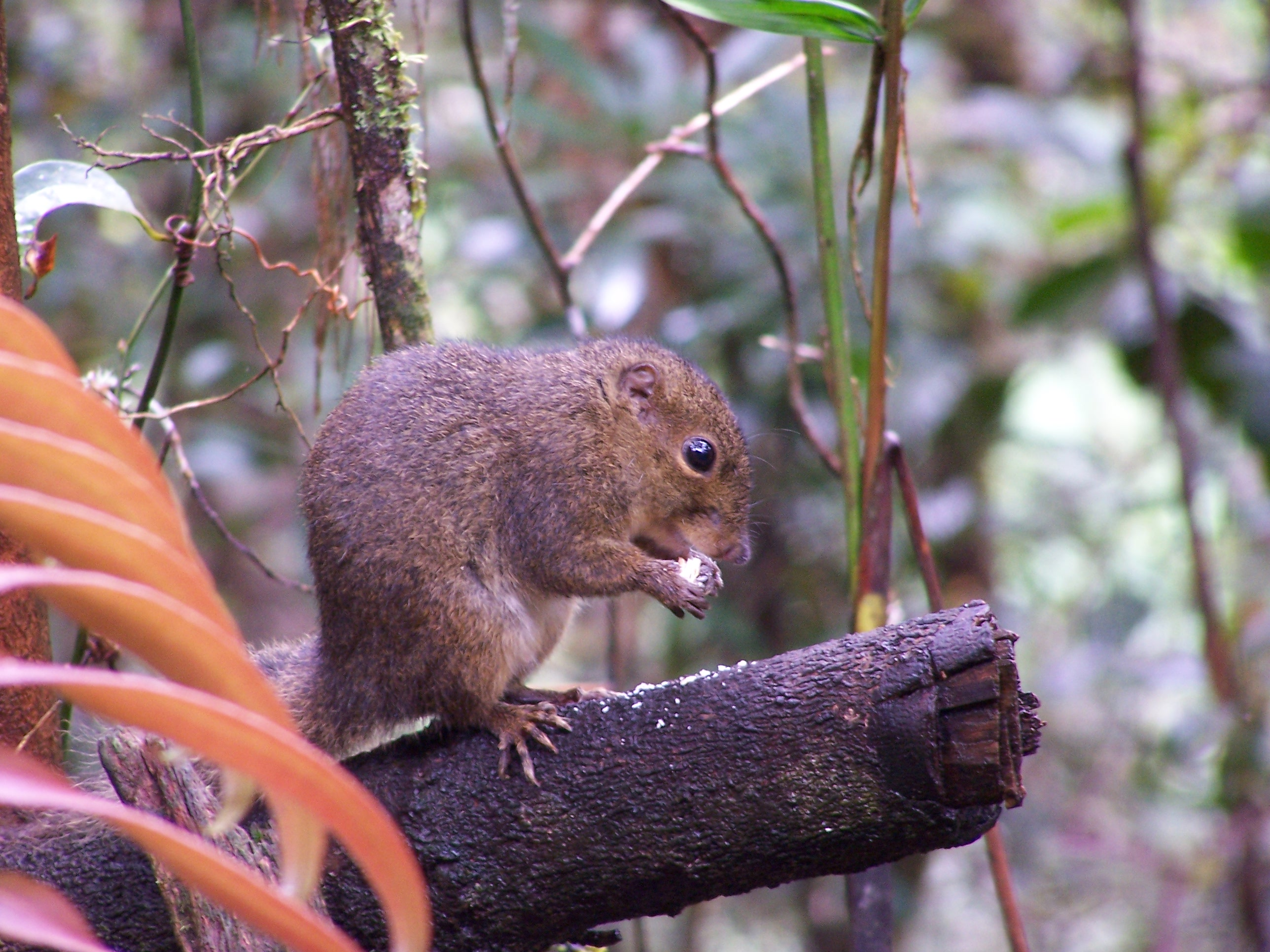
Mountain squirrel

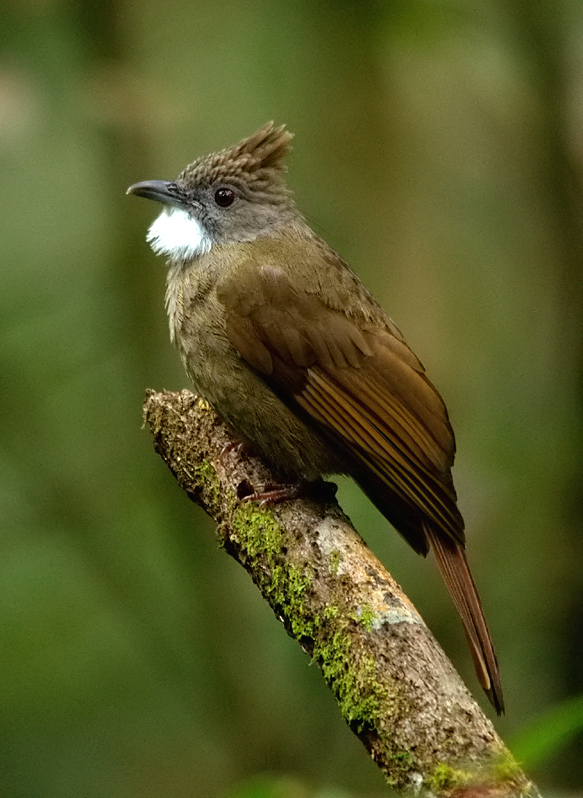
Ochraceous bulbul

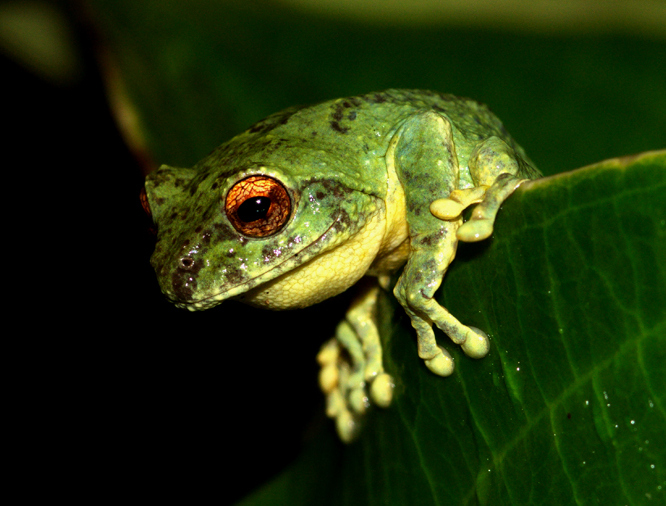
Male Philautus bunitus

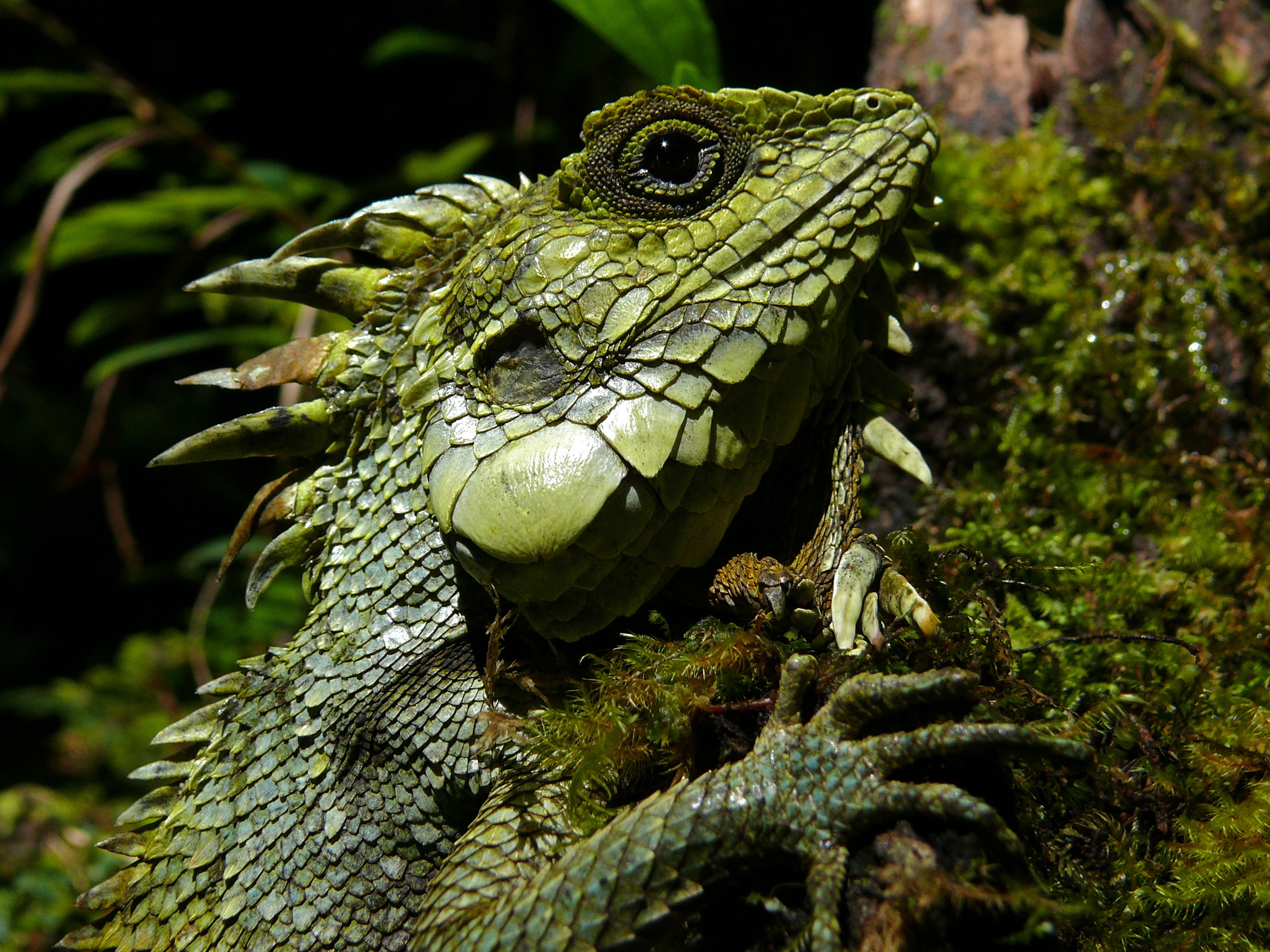
Crested dragon (Hypsicalotes kinabaluensis)

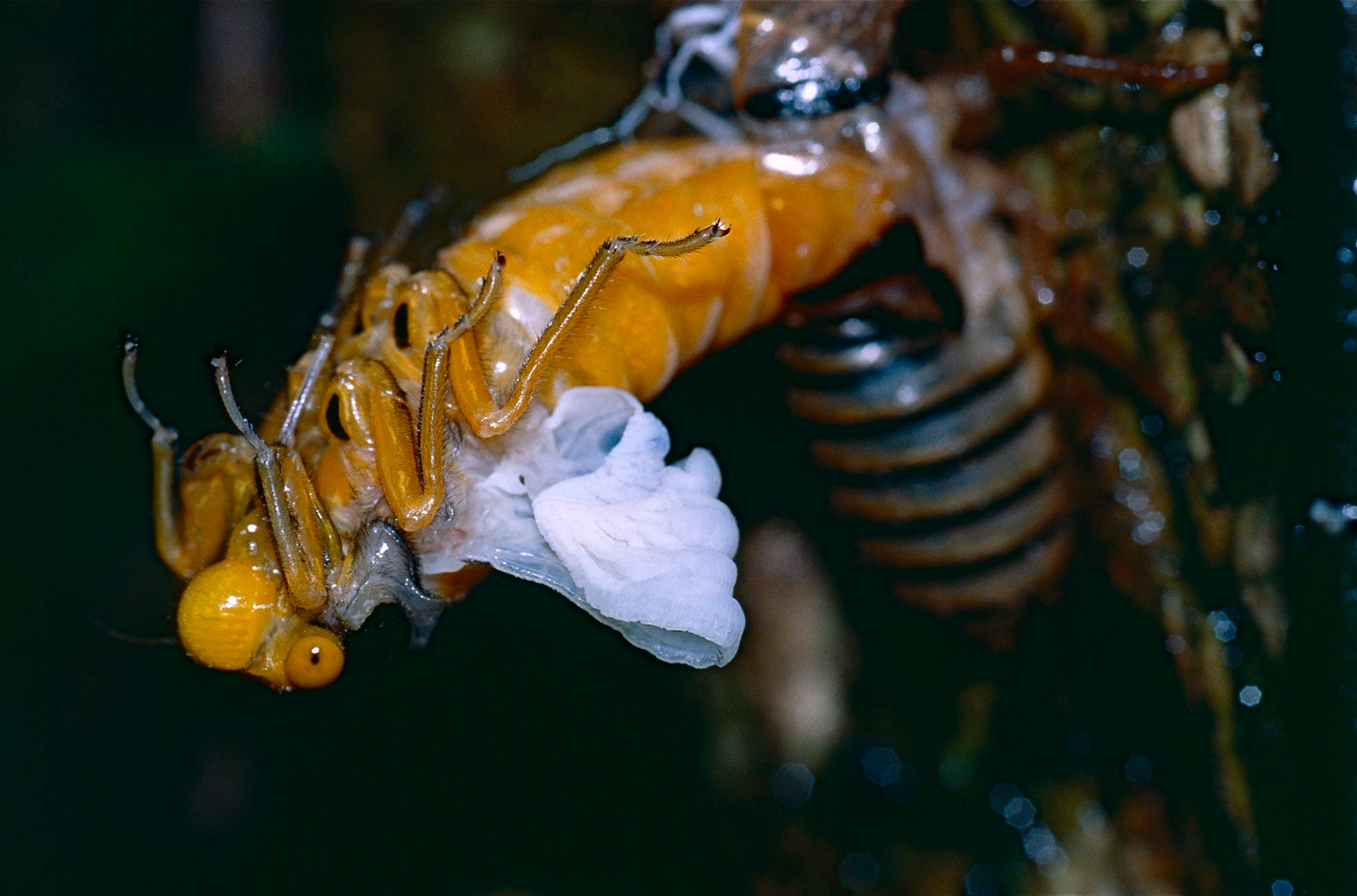
Black and golden cicada (Huechys fusca)

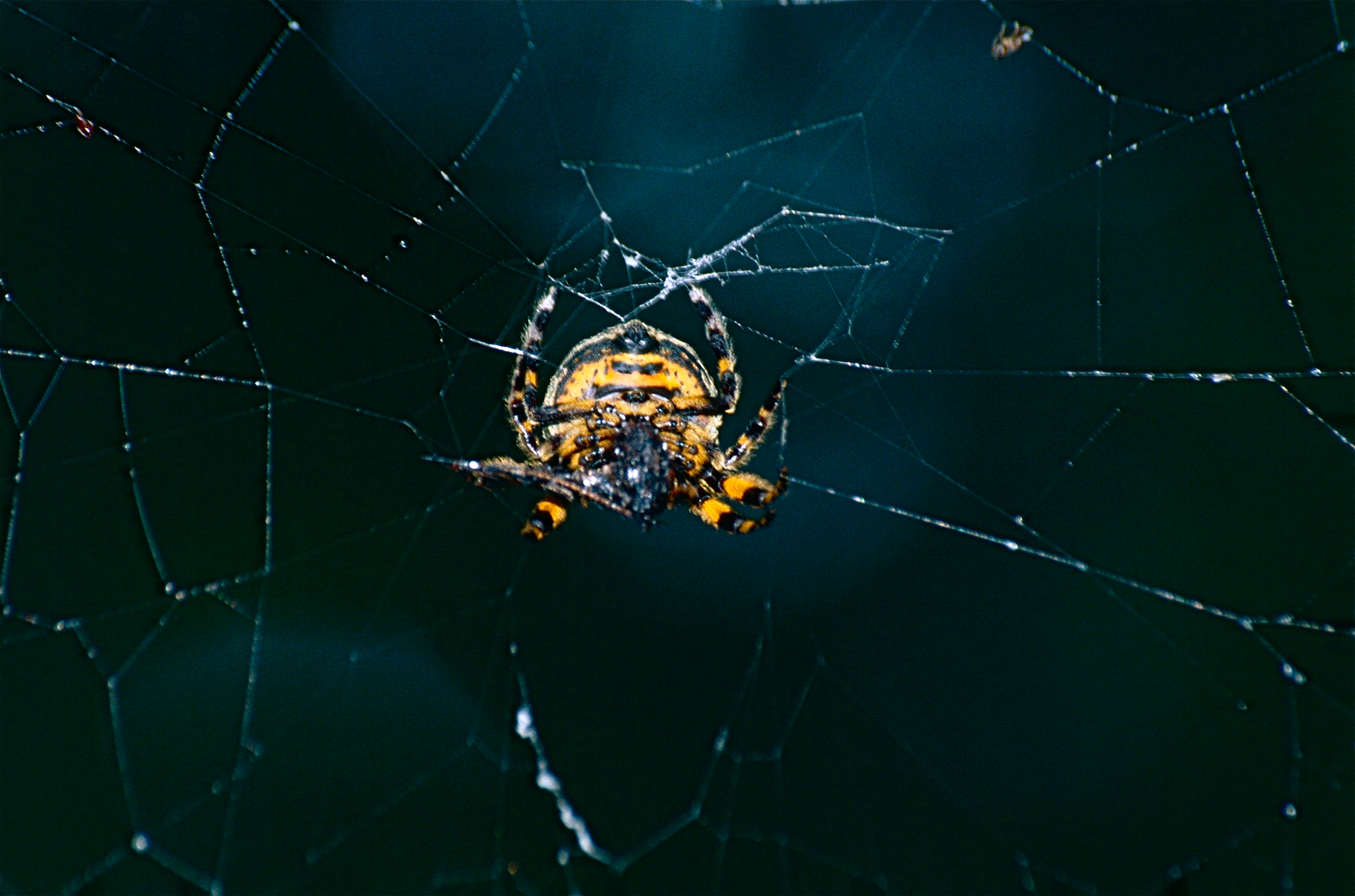
Orbweb spider (Araneidae)

== See also ==
- Pekan Nabalu
- Kundasang
