= Siderolamprus owenii =

Conservation status
- Data Deficient (IUCN 3.1)

Scientific classification
- Kingdom: Animalia
- Phylum: Chordata
- Class: Reptilia
- Order: Squamata
- Suborder: Anguimorpha
- Family: Diploglossidae
- Genus: Siderolamprus
- Species: S. owenii

Binomial name
- Siderolamprus owenii (A.M.C. Duméril & Bibron, 1839)

Synonyms
- Diploglossus owenii A.M.C. Duméril & Bibron, 1839; Celestus owenii (A.M.C. Duméril & Bibron, 1839)

Species of lizard

Siderolamprus owenii, also known commonly as Owen's galliwasp, is a species of lizard in the family Diploglossidae. The species is native to Guatemala and Mexico.

== Etymology ==
Siderolamprus owenii was named after British biologist and paleontologist Richard Owen.

== Taxonomy ==
Siderolamprus owenii was originally classified in the genus Diploglossus, but was moved to Celestus by Cope in 1868, back to Diploglossus by Boulenger in 1885, and to Siderolamprus by Schools and Hedges in 2021.

== Reproduction ==
Siderolamprus owenii is oviparous.
