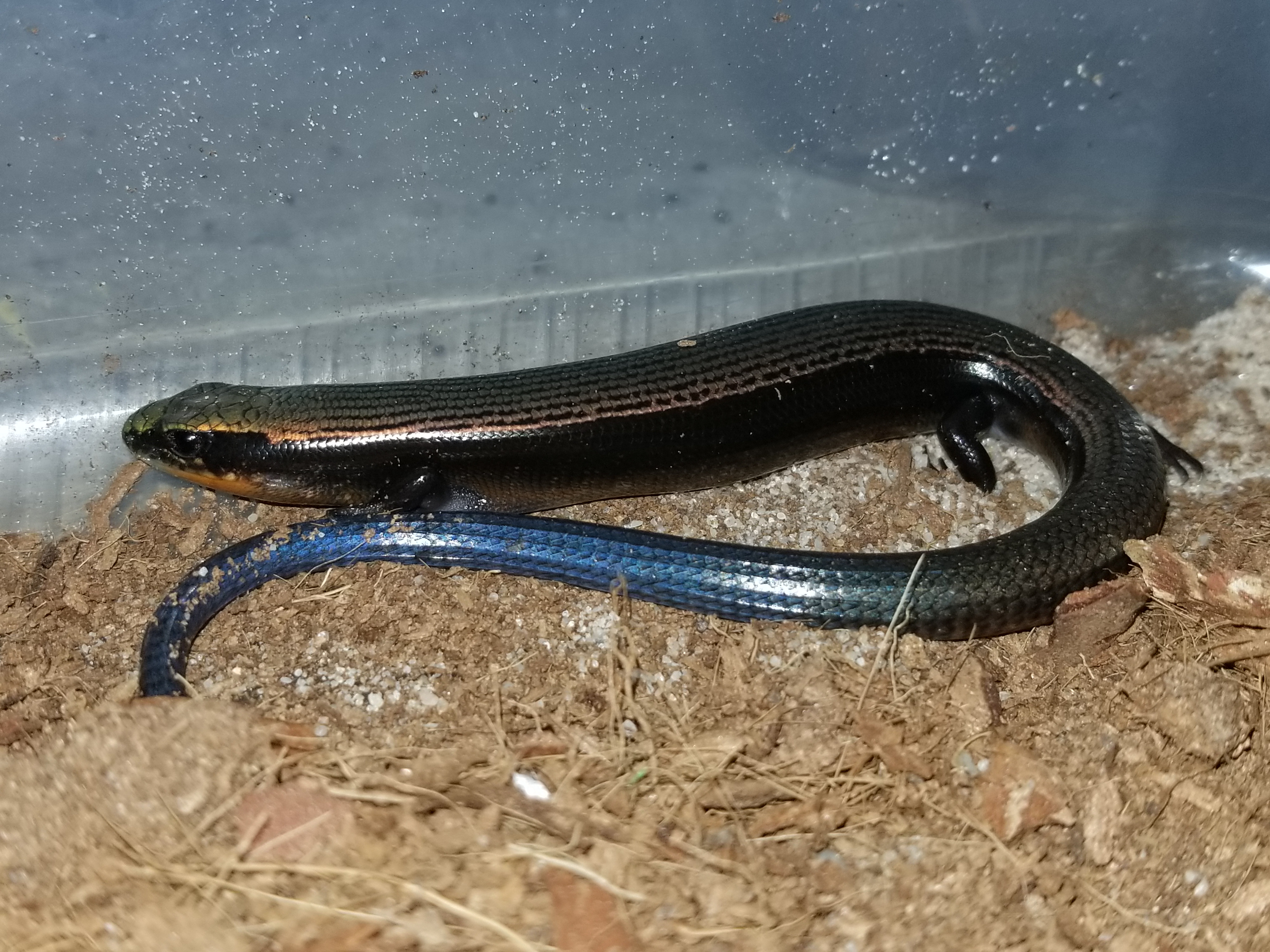
- Adult male

Conservation status
- Data Deficient (IUCN 3.1)

Scientific classification
- Kingdom: Animalia
- Phylum: Chordata
- Class: Reptilia
- Order: Squamata
- Suborder: Anguimorpha
- Family: Diploglossidae
- Genus: Siderolamprus
- Species: S. ingridae

Binomial name
- Siderolamprus ingridae (Werler & Campbell, 2004)

Synonyms
- Diploglossus ingridae Werler & Campbell, 2004; Celestus ingridae — Savage, Lips & Ibáñez, 2008; Siderolamprus ingridae — Schools & Hedges, 2021

= Siderolamprus ingridae =

Species of lizard

Siderolamprus ingridae, also known commonly as Ingrid's galliwasp, is a species of lizard in the family Diploglossidae. The species is native to Mexico.

== Etymology ==
The specific name, ingridae, is in honor of Ingrid Longstrom Werler (1923–2003), who was the wife John E. Werler.

== Taxonomy ==
S. ingridae was formerly classified in the genera Diploglossus and then Celestus, but was moved to the genus Siderolamprus in 2021.

== Geographic range ==
S. ingridae is endemic to the Mexican state of Veracruz.

== Description ==
S. ingridae may attain a snout-to-vent length (SVL) of 10.5 cm (4.1 in).

== Habitat ==
The preferred natural habitat of S. ingridae is forest, at altitudes around 1,200 m (3,900 ft).

== Reproduction ==
S. ingridae is oviparous.
