= Wetmorena haetiana =

Conservation status
- Endangered (IUCN 3.1)

Scientific classification
- Kingdom: Animalia
- Phylum: Chordata
- Class: Reptilia
- Order: Squamata
- Suborder: Anguimorpha
- Family: Diploglossidae
- Genus: Wetmorena
- Species: W. haetiana

Binomial name
- Wetmorena haetiana Cochran, 1927

Synonyms
- Celestus haetianus (Cochran, 1927)

Species of lizard

Wetmorena haetiana, the Hispaniolan earless galliwasp or earless galliwasp, is an endangered species of lizard of the Diploglossidae family endemic to the Caribbean island of Hispaniola (in the Dominican Republic and Haiti).

== Taxonomy ==
It was formerly classified in the genus Celestus, but was moved back to Wetmorena in 2021.
