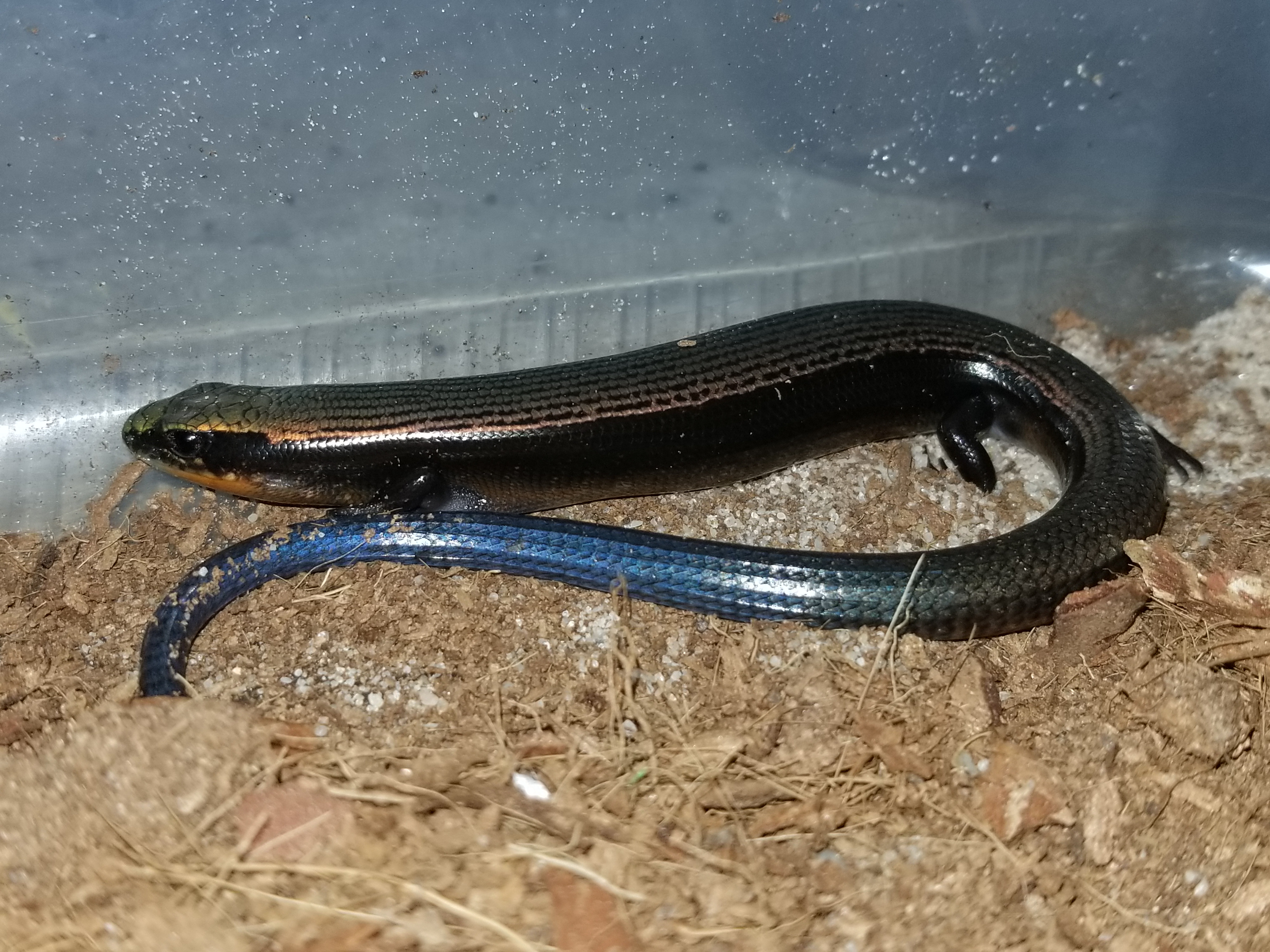
- Ingrid’s galliwasp (S. ingridae)

Scientific classification
- Kingdom: Animalia
- Phylum: Chordata
- Class: Reptilia
- Order: Squamata
- Suborder: Anguimorpha
- Family: Diploglossidae
- Subfamily: Siderolamprinae
- Genus: Siderolamprus; Cope, 1861

Species
- See text

= Siderolamprus =

Genus of lizards

Siderolamprus is a genus of lizards in the family Diploglossidae. Member species are found throughout much of Central America. They are considered the only members of the subfamily Siderolamprinae, although Diploglossus bilobatus is sometimes reclassified into the monotypic genus Mesoamericus and placed with them.

All species in this genus were previously classified in either Celestus or Diploglossus until a 2021 study found members of both groups to form a distinct grouping from any other diploglossid lizards. The genus Siderolamprus was revived for these species.

== Species ==
The following 14 species are recognized as being valid.

- Siderolamprus adercus (Savage, Lips & Ibáñez, 2008)
- Siderolamprus atitlanensis (H.M. Smith, 1950) – Atitlán galliwasp
- Siderolamprus bivittatus (Boulenger, 1895) – two-banded galliwasp
- Siderolamprus cyanochloris (Cope, 1894)
- Siderolamprus enneagrammus Cope, 1861 – Huaxteca lesser galliwasp
- Siderolamprus hylaius (Savage & Lips, 1993)
- Siderolamprus ingridae (Werler & Campbell, 2004) – Ingrid’s galliwasp
- Siderolamprus laf (Lotzkat, Hertz & G. Köhler, 2016)
- Siderolamprus legnotus (Campbell & Camarillo, 1994) – Campbell's galliwasp
- Siderolamprus montanus (Schmidt, 1933) – mountain lesser galliwasp
- Siderolamprus orobius (Savage & Lips, 1993)
- Siderolamprus owenii (A.M.C. Duméril & Bibron, 1839) – Owen's galliwasp
- Siderolamprus rozellae (H.M. Smith, 1942) – Rozella's lesser galliwasp
- Siderolamprus scansorius (McCranie & Wilson, 1996)

Nota bene: A binomial authority in parentheses indicates that the species was originally described in a genus other than Siderolamprus.
