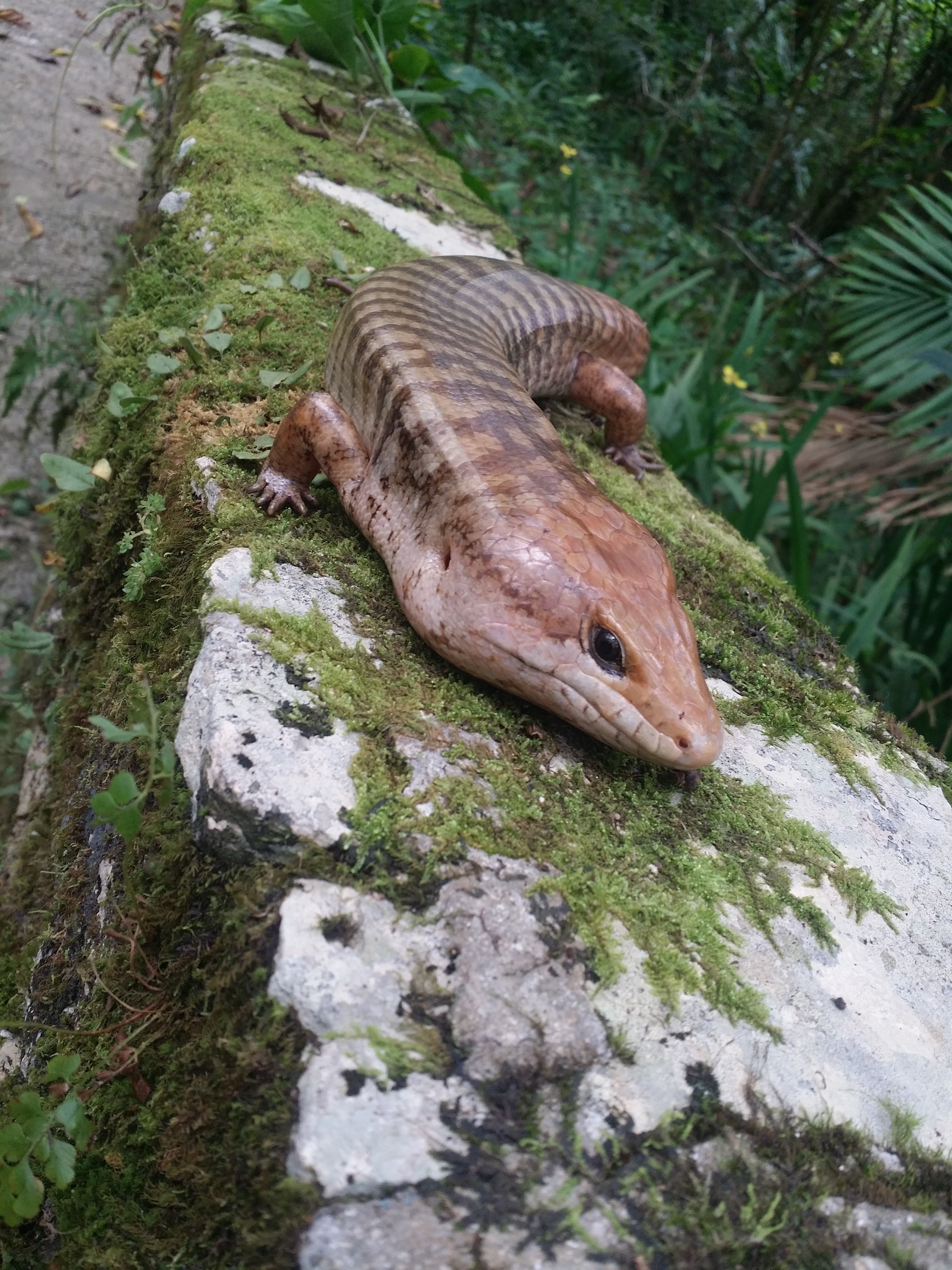
- Adult male in Dominican Republic

Conservation status
- Vulnerable (IUCN 3.1)

Scientific classification
- Kingdom: Animalia
- Phylum: Chordata
- Class: Reptilia
- Order: Squamata
- Suborder: Anguimorpha
- Family: Diploglossidae
- Genus: Caribicus
- Species: C. warreni

Binomial name
- Caribicus warreni (Schwartz, 1970)

Synonyms
- Diploglossus warreni Schwartz, 1970; Diploglossus carraui Incháustegui, Schwartz & Henderson, 1985; Celestus carraui Incháustegui, Schwartz & Henderson, 1985; Celestus warreni — Powell et al., 1996

= Caribicus warreni =

Species of lizard

Caribicus warreni, commonly known as the Haitian giant galliwasp or the Hispaniolan giant galliwasp, is a species of lizard in the family Diploglossidae. The species is endemic to the island of Hispaniola.

== Taxonomy ==
It was formerly classified in the genus Celestus, but was moved to Caribicus in 2021.

== Etymology ==
The specific name, warreni, is in honor of Mr. C. Rhea Warren who collected herpetological specimens on Île de la Tortue.

== Geographic range ==
C. warreni is found in both the Dominican Republic and Haiti.

== Description ==
True to its common name, C. warreni is a large anguid, weighing in at 68 grams (2.4 ounces).

== Habitat ==
The natural habitat of C. warreni are Hispaniolan moist forests underneath leaf litter and forest debris.

== Diet ==
The giant Hispaniolan galliwasp is an opportunistic predator that feed on insects, earthworms, small mammals, and other reptiles.

== Conservation status ==
C. warreni is threatened by habitat loss, predation by invasive species (such as the small Indian mongoose), and collection for the illegal pet trade. Persecution is also an issue; the galliwasp is erroneously believed to be venomous by locals, and is often killed on sight across the island.
