= Caribicus darlingtoni =

Conservation status
- Endangered (IUCN 3.1)

Scientific classification
- Kingdom: Animalia
- Phylum: Chordata
- Class: Reptilia
- Order: Squamata
- Suborder: Anguimorpha
- Family: Diploglossidae
- Genus: Caribicus
- Species: C. darlingtoni

Binomial name
- Caribicus darlingtoni (Cochran, 1939)

Synonyms
- Celestus darlingtoni Cochran, 1939; Diploglossus darlingtoni Underwood, 1959; Celestus darlingtoni Schwartz & Henderson, 1991; Caribicus darlingtoni Schools & Hedges, 2021

Species of lizard

Caribicus darlingtoni, also known commonly as Darlington's galliwasp and the Hispaniolan striped galliwasp, is a species of lizard in the family Diploglossidae. The species is endemic to the Dominican Republic on the Caribbean island of Hispaniola.

== Taxonomy ==
C. darlingtoni was formerly classified in the genus Celestus, but was moved to the genus Caribicus in 2021.

== Etymology ==
The specific name, darlingtoni, is in honor of American entomologist Philip Jackson Darlington Jr.

== Habitat ==
The preferred natural habitat of C. darlingtoni is Hispaniolan pine forests, at altitudes of 1,600–2,500 m (5,200–8,200 ft).

== Description ==
Males of C. darlingtoni may attain a snout-to-vent length (SVL) of 8.5 cm (3.3 in). Females are about one fifth smaller, only attaining 7.0 cm (2.8 in) SVL.

== Reproduction ==
C. darlingtoni is oviparous.
