= Siderolamprus adercus =

Conservation status
- Data Deficient (IUCN 3.1)

Scientific classification
- Kingdom: Animalia
- Phylum: Chordata
- Class: Reptilia
- Order: Squamata
- Suborder: Anguimorpha
- Family: Diploglossidae
- Genus: Siderolamprus
- Species: S. adercus

Binomial name
- Siderolamprus adercus (Savage, Lips, & Ibáñez, 2008)

Synonyms
- Celestus adercus Savage, Lips, & Ibáñez, 2008

Species of lizard

Siderolamprus adercus is a species of lizard of the Diploglossidae family. It is found in Panama.

It was formerly classified in the genus Celestus, but was moved to Siderolamprus in 2021.
