= Guarocuyus =

Jaragua forest lizard

Scientific classification
- Kingdom: Animalia
- Phylum: Chordata
- Class: Reptilia
- Order: Squamata
- Suborder: Anguimorpha
- Family: Diploglossidae
- Subfamily: Celestinae
- Genus: Guarocuyus; Landestoy, Schools, & Hedges, 2022
- Species: G. jaraguanus

Binomial name
- Guarocuyus jaraguanus Landestoy, Schools, & Hedges, 2022

Species of lizard

The Jaragua forest lizard (Guarocuyus jaraguanus) is a species of lizard of the family Diploglossidae endemic to the Dominican Republic on the Caribbean island of Hispaniola.

== Taxonomy ==
It is the only member of the genus Guarocuyus. It was named in honor of the Taíno cacique Enriquillo, whose indigenous name is thought to have been "Guarocuya". Being both a monotypic genus and species restricted to a single island and described only in 2022, G. jaraguanus is unique among recently-described reptiles. It is the sister group to the clade containing the genera Celestus, Comptus, and Panolopus (the latter two of which were previously considered synonymous with Celestus until 2021).

== Description ==
It is unique among celestines due to its nocturnal, arboreal habits with a semi-prehensile tail and webbed toes.

== Distribution and habitat ==
It is found in the Dominican Republic, where it is known only from two small, adjacent keys in the Laguna de Oviedo, a lagoon in Jaragua National Park.
