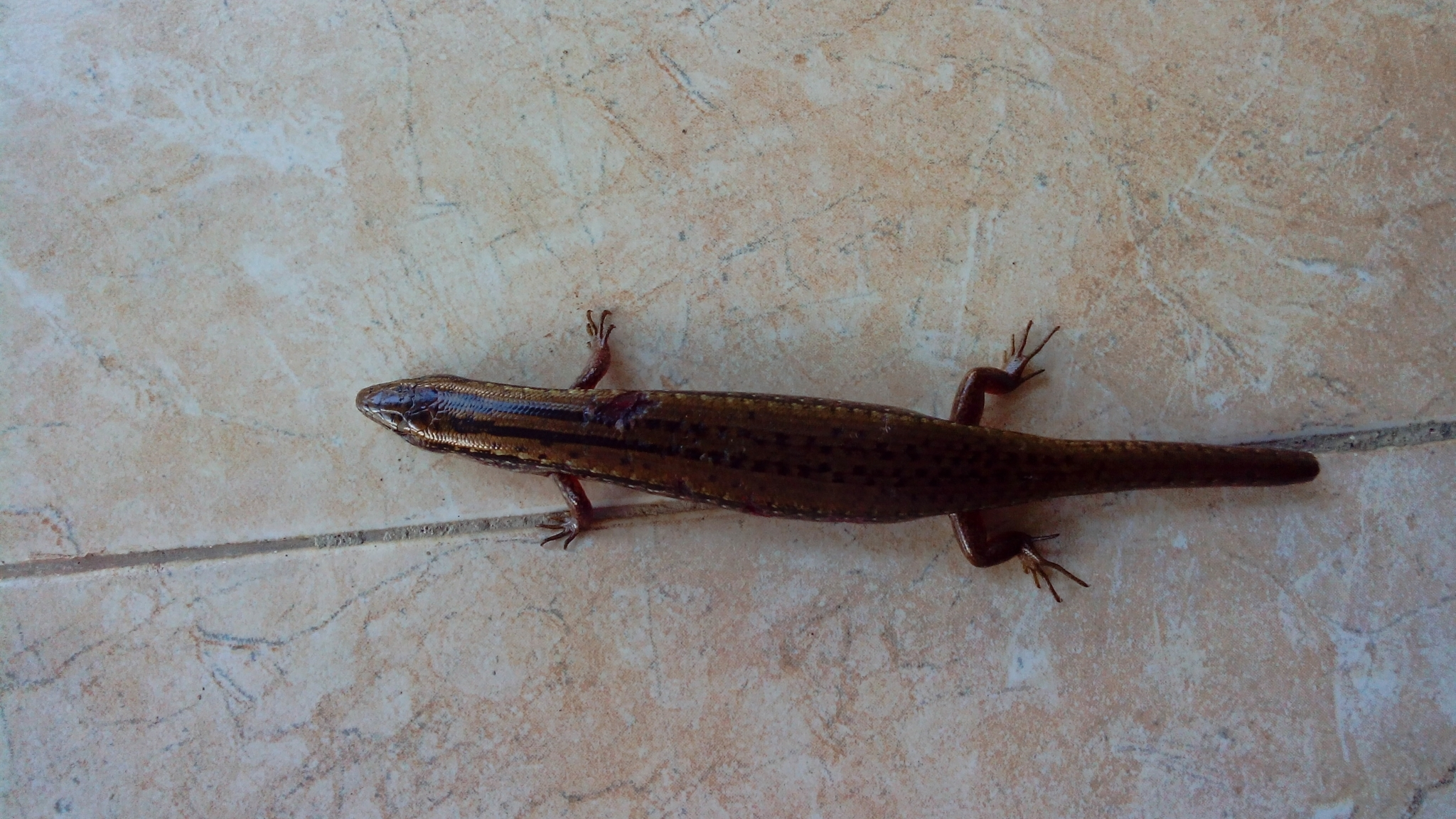

Conservation status
- Least Concern (IUCN 3.1)

Scientific classification
- Kingdom: Animalia
- Phylum: Chordata
- Class: Reptilia
- Order: Squamata
- Suborder: Anguimorpha
- Family: Diploglossidae
- Genus: Comptus
- Species: C. stenurus

Binomial name
- Comptus stenurus (Cope, 1862)

Synonyms
- Celestus stenurus; Diploglossus stenurus

= Comptus stenurus =

Species of lizard

Comptus stenurus, the Hispaniolan keeled galliwasp or Cope's galliwasp, is a species of lizard of the Diploglossidae family endemic to the Caribbean island of Hispaniola (in both the Dominican Republic and Haiti).

== Taxonomy ==
It was formerly classified in the genus Celestus, but was moved to Comptus in 2021.
