= Siderolamprus montanus =

Conservation status
- Endangered (IUCN 3.1)

Scientific classification
- Kingdom: Animalia
- Phylum: Chordata
- Class: Reptilia
- Order: Squamata
- Suborder: Anguimorpha
- Family: Diploglossidae
- Genus: Siderolamprus
- Species: S. montanus

Binomial name
- Siderolamprus montanus (Schmidt, 1933)

Synonyms
- Diploglossus montanus Schmidt, 1933

Species of lizard

Siderolamprus montanus, the mountain lesser galliwasp, is a species of lizard of the Diploglossidae family. It is found in Honduras.

It was formerly classified in the genus Diploglossus, but was moved to Siderolamprus in 2021.
