= Siderolamprus cyanochloris =

Conservation status
- Least Concern (IUCN 3.1)

Scientific classification
- Kingdom: Animalia
- Phylum: Chordata
- Class: Reptilia
- Order: Squamata
- Suborder: Anguimorpha
- Family: Diploglossidae
- Genus: Siderolamprus
- Species: S. cyanochloris

Binomial name
- Siderolamprus cyanochloris (Cope, 1894)

Synonyms
- Celestus cyanochloris

Species of lizard

Siderolamprus cyanochloris is a species of lizard of the Diploglossidae family. It is found in Costa Rica.

It was formerly classified in the genus Celestus, but was moved to Siderolamprus in 2021.
