= Siderolamprus legnotus =

Conservation status
- Least Concern (IUCN 3.1)

Scientific classification
- Kingdom: Animalia
- Phylum: Chordata
- Class: Reptilia
- Order: Squamata
- Suborder: Anguimorpha
- Family: Diploglossidae
- Genus: Siderolamprus
- Species: S. legnotus

Binomial name
- Siderolamprus legnotus (Campbell & Camarillo, 1994)

Synonyms
- Celestus legnotus Campbell & Camarillo, 1994

Species of lizard

Siderolamprus legnotus, Campbell's galliwasp, is a species of lizard of the Diploglossidae family. It is found in Mexico.

It was formerly classified in the genus Celestus, but was moved to Siderolamprus in 2021.
