= Siderolamprus scansorius =

Conservation status
- Endangered (IUCN 3.1)

Scientific classification
- Kingdom: Animalia
- Phylum: Chordata
- Class: Reptilia
- Order: Squamata
- Suborder: Anguimorpha
- Family: Diploglossidae
- Genus: Siderolamprus
- Species: S. scansorius

Binomial name
- Siderolamprus scansorius (McCranie & Wilson, 1996)

Synonyms
- Diploglossus scansorius

Species of lizard

Siderolamprus scansorius is a species of lizard of the Diploglossidae family. It is found in Honduras.

It was formerly classified in the genus Diploglossus, but was moved to Siderolamprus in 2021.
