= Siderolamprus enneagrammus =

Conservation status
- Least Concern (IUCN 3.1)

Scientific classification
- Kingdom: Animalia
- Phylum: Chordata
- Class: Reptilia
- Order: Squamata
- Suborder: Anguimorpha
- Family: Diploglossidae
- Genus: Siderolamprus
- Species: S. enneagrammus

Binomial name
- Siderolamprus enneagrammus Cope, 1861
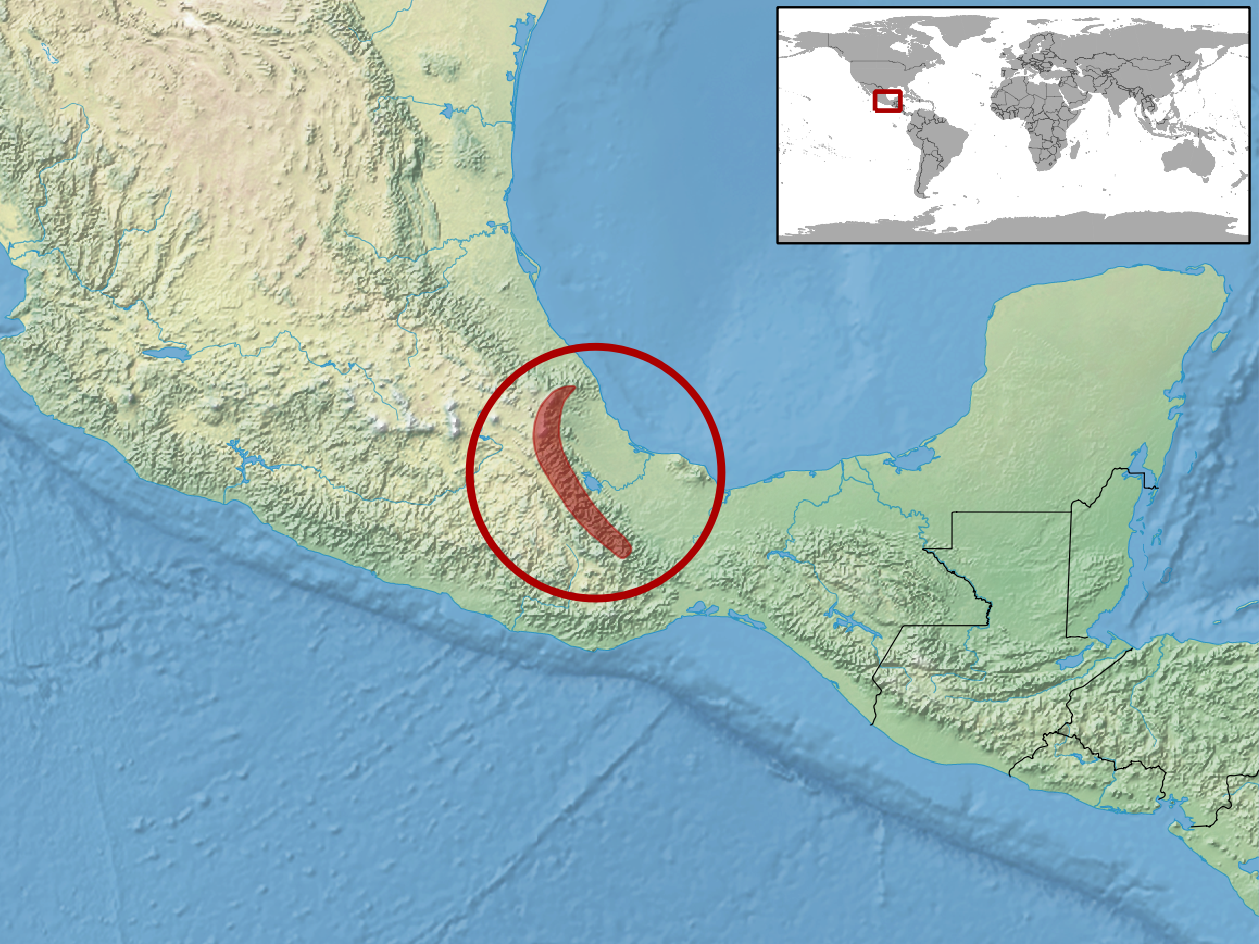

Synonyms
- Celestus enneagrammus (Cope, 1861)

Species of lizard

Siderolamprus enneagrammus, the Huaxteca lesser galliwasp, is a species of lizard of the Diploglossidae family. It is found in Mexico.

It was initially described in the genus Siderolamprus but was later moved to the genus Celestus. It was moved back to Siderolamprus in 2021.
