= Siderolamprus atitlanensis =

Conservation status
- Data Deficient (IUCN 3.1)

Scientific classification
- Kingdom: Animalia
- Phylum: Chordata
- Class: Reptilia
- Order: Squamata
- Suborder: Anguimorpha
- Family: Diploglossidae
- Genus: Siderolamprus
- Species: S. atitlanensis

Binomial name
- Siderolamprus atitlanensis (Smith, 1950)

Synonyms
- Diploglossus atitlanensis

Species of lizard

Siderolamprus atitlanensis, the Atitlán galliwasp, is a species of lizard of the Diploglossidae family. It is found in Mexico, Guatemala, and El Salvador.

It was formerly classified in the genus Diploglossus, but was moved to Siderolamprus in 2021.
