= Siderolamprus bivittatus =

Conservation status
- Endangered (IUCN 3.1)

Scientific classification
- Kingdom: Animalia
- Phylum: Chordata
- Class: Reptilia
- Order: Squamata
- Suborder: Anguimorpha
- Family: Diploglossidae
- Genus: Siderolamprus
- Species: S. bivittatus

Binomial name
- Siderolamprus bivittatus (Boulenger, 1895)

Synonyms
- Diploglossus bivittatus

Species of lizard

Siderolamprus bivittatus, the two-banded galliwasp, is a species of lizard of the Diploglossidae family. It is found in Guatemala, Honduras, El Salvador, and Nicaragua.

It was formerly classified in the genus Diploglossus, but was moved to Siderolamprus in 2021.
