= Jamaican galliwasp =

There are two species of lizard named Jamaican galliwasp:

- Celestus crusculus
- Celestus molesworthi
