= Wetmorena agasepsoides =

Conservation status
- Endangered (IUCN 3.1)

Scientific classification
- Kingdom: Animalia
- Phylum: Chordata
- Class: Reptilia
- Order: Squamata
- Suborder: Anguimorpha
- Family: Diploglossidae
- Genus: Wetmorena
- Species: W. agasepsoides

Binomial name
- Wetmorena agasepsoides (Thomas, 1971)

Synonyms
- Celestus agasepsoides (Thomas, 1971)

Species of lizard

Wetmorena agasepsoides, the serpentine four-toed galliwasp, is an endangered species of lizard of the Diploglossidae family endemic to the Dominican Republic on the Caribbean island of Hispaniola.

== Taxonomy ==
It was formerly classified in the genus Celestus, but was moved to Wetmorena in 2021.
