= Garman's galliwasp =

There are two species of lizard named Garman's galliwasp:

- Celestus crusculus
- Celestus molesworthi
