= Siderolamprus laf =

Scientific classification
- Kingdom: Animalia
- Phylum: Chordata
- Class: Reptilia
- Order: Squamata
- Suborder: Anguimorpha
- Family: Diploglossidae
- Genus: Siderolamprus
- Species: S. laf

Binomial name
- Siderolamprus laf (Lotzkat, Hertz & Köhler, 2016)

Synonyms
- Celestus laf Lotzkat, Hertz & Köhler, 2016

Species of lizard

Siderolamprus laf is a species of lizard of the Diploglossidae family. It is found in Panama.

It was formerly classified in the genus Celestus, but was moved to Siderolamprus in 2021.
