= Comptus maculatus =

Conservation status
- Endangered (IUCN 3.1)

Scientific classification
- Kingdom: Animalia
- Phylum: Chordata
- Class: Reptilia
- Order: Squamata
- Suborder: Anguimorpha
- Family: Diploglossidae
- Genus: Comptus
- Species: C. maculatus

Binomial name
- Comptus maculatus (Garman, 1888)

Synonyms
- Celestus maculatus

Species of lizard

Comptus maculatus, the Cayman galliwasp, is a species of lizard of the Diploglossidae family endemic to the Cayman Islands.

== Taxonomy ==
It was formerly classified in the genus Celestus, but was moved to Comptus in 2021.
