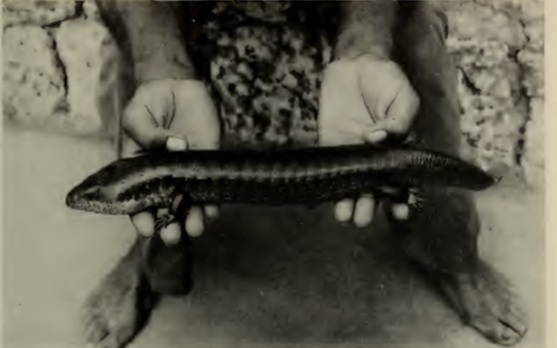
- Photo of holotype

Conservation status
- Critically endangered, possibly extinct (IUCN 3.1)

Scientific classification
- Kingdom: Animalia
- Phylum: Chordata
- Class: Reptilia
- Order: Squamata
- Suborder: Anguimorpha
- Family: Diploglossidae
- Genus: Caribicus
- Species: C. anelpistus

Binomial name
- Caribicus anelpistus (Schwartz, Graham, & Duval, 1979)

Synonyms
- Celestus anelpistus

= Caribicus anelpistus =

Species of lizard

Caribicus anelpistus, the Altagracia giant galliwasp or giant Hispaniolan galliwasp, is a species of lizard of the Diploglossidae family endemic to the Dominican Republic on the Caribbean island of Hispaniola.

== Taxonomy ==
Along with the other members of its genus, it was formerly classified in the genus Celestus.

== Conservation ==
Due to habitat loss and predation from introduced mammals (such as small Indian mongooses and feral cats), it is considered critically endangered, and previously considered to be extinct. Known only from the holotype, it was not seen since 1977 in San Cristobal Province, with a giant galliwasp sighted in the vicinity of Jarabacoa in 2004 thought to have been of this species.

On 25 March 2020, an adult male specimen has been captured by a local resident at La Lomita. Other locals have reported sightings of similar animals, especially at night, suggesting that a small population exists in the area. In September 2026, 2 individuals were later found in the Parque Nacional La Humeadora near Villa Altagracia, confirming the existence of a population.
