= Comptus badius =

Conservation status
- Least Concern (IUCN 3.1)

Scientific classification
- Kingdom: Animalia
- Phylum: Chordata
- Class: Reptilia
- Order: Squamata
- Suborder: Anguimorpha
- Family: Diploglossidae
- Genus: Comptus
- Species: C. badius

Binomial name
- Comptus badius (Cope, 1868)

Synonyms
- Celestus badius Cope, 1868

Species of lizard

Comptus badius, the Navassa galliwasp, is a species of lizard of the family Diploglossidae endemic to Navassa Island.

== Taxonomy ==
It was formerly classified in the genus Celestus, but was moved to Comptus in 2021.
