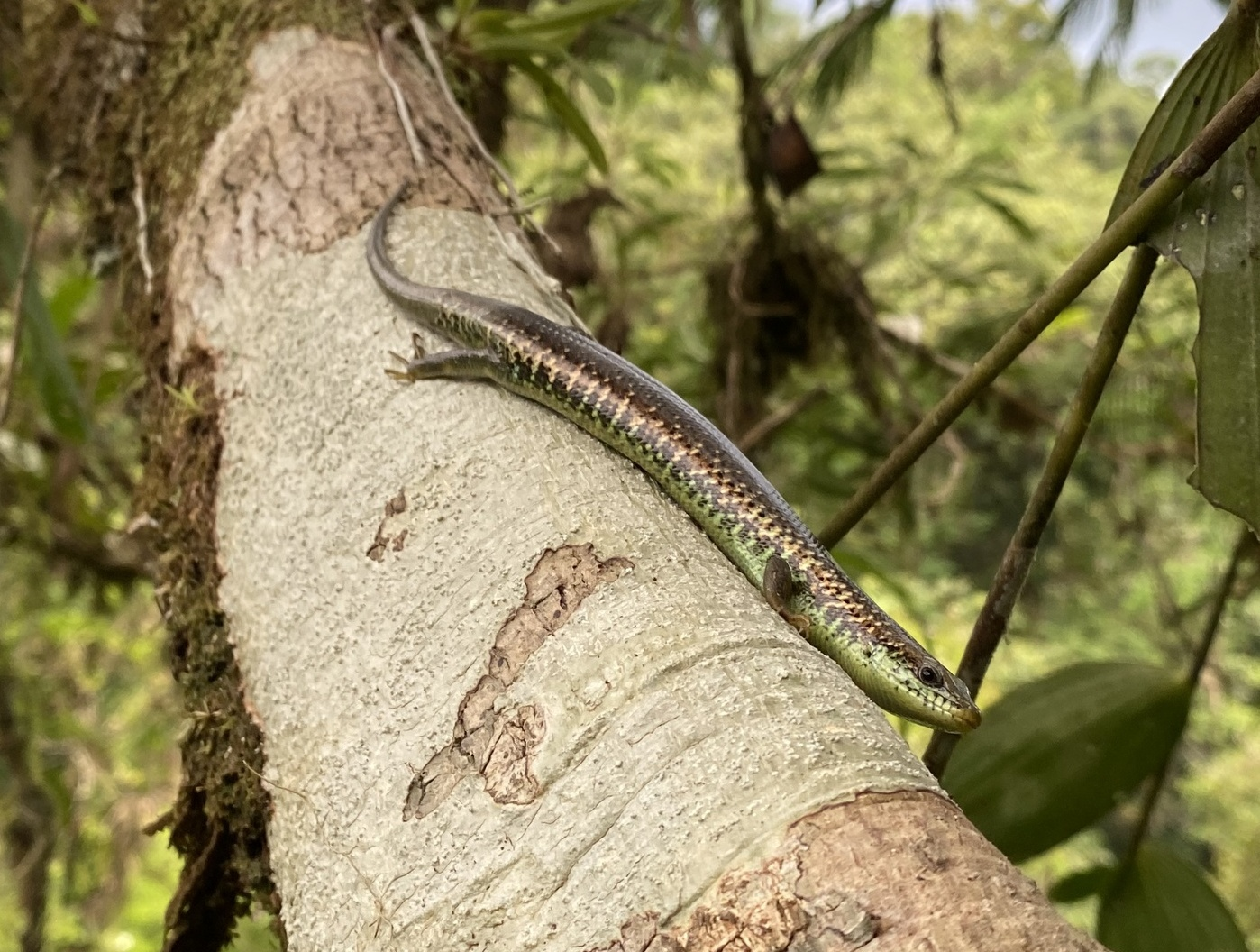
- Siderolamprus hylaius

Conservation status
- Near Threatened (IUCN 3.1)

Scientific classification
- Kingdom: Animalia
- Phylum: Chordata
- Class: Reptilia
- Order: Squamata
- Suborder: Anguimorpha
- Family: Diploglossidae
- Genus: Siderolamprus
- Species: S. hylaius

Binomial name
- Siderolamprus hylaius (Savage & Lips, 1993)

Synonyms
- Celestus hylaius Savage & Lips, 1993

= Siderolamprus hylaius =

Species of lizard

Siderolamprus hylaius is a species of lizard of the Diploglossidae family. It is found in Costa Rica.

It was formerly classified in the genus Celestus, but was moved to Siderolamprus in 2021.
