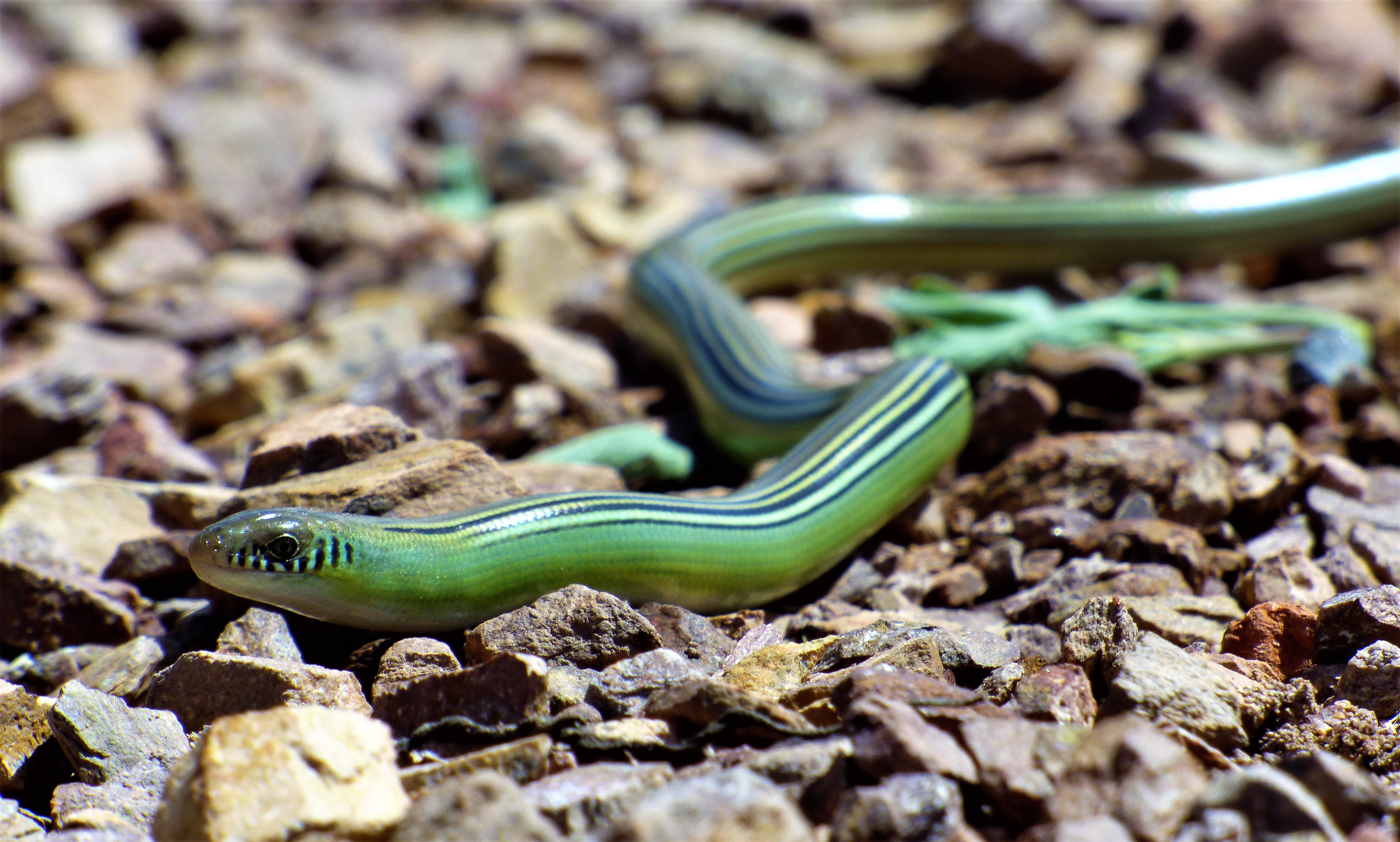
- Ophiodes striatus in Uruguay, photo by National Museum of Natural History, Uruguay

Conservation status
- Least Concern (IUCN 3.1)

Scientific classification
- Kingdom: Animalia
- Phylum: Chordata
- Class: Reptilia
- Order: Squamata
- Suborder: Anguimorpha
- Family: Diploglossidae
- Genus: Ophiodes
- Species: O. striatus

Binomial name
- Ophiodes striatus (Spix, 1824)

= Ophiodes striatus =

Species of lizard

Ophiodes striatus, the striped worm lizard, is a species of limbless lizard of the Diploglossidae family. It is found in Brazil, Paraguay, and Uruguay.
