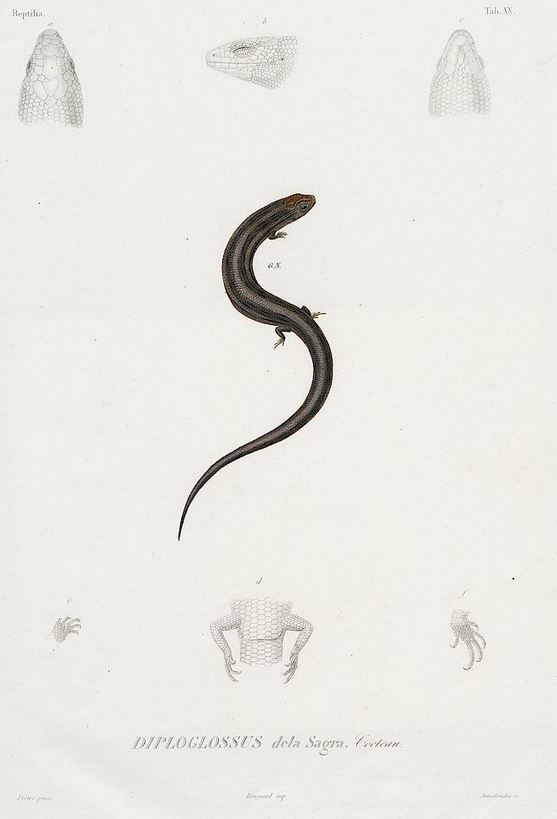

Conservation status
- Least Concern (IUCN 3.1)

Scientific classification
- Kingdom: Animalia
- Phylum: Chordata
- Class: Reptilia
- Order: Squamata
- Suborder: Anguimorpha
- Family: Diploglossidae
- Genus: Diploglossus
- Species: D. delasagra

Binomial name
- Diploglossus delasagra (Cocteau, 1838)

Synonyms
- Seincus [sic] (Diploglossus) de la sagra Cocteau, 1838; Diploglossus sagrei — A.M.C. Duméril & Bibron, 1839; Celestus delasagra — Schwartz & Ogren, 1956; Diploglossus delasagra — Greer, 1967

= Diploglossus delasagra =

Species of lizard

Diploglossus delasagra, also known as the Cuban galliwasp, the Cuban pale-necked galliwasp, or la culebrita de cuatro patas (Cuban Spanish: "the little four-legged snake"), is a species of lizard in the family Diploglossidae endemic to Cuba.

== Etymology ==
The specific name, delasagra, is in honor of Spanish botanist Ramón de la Sagra.

== Habitat ==
The preferred natural habitat of D. delasagra is forest, but it is also found in orchards and plantations.

== Description ==
Small for the genus Diploglossus, adults of D. delasagra have a snout-to-vent length (SVL) of about 12 cm (4.7 in). A short-legged species, it is brown dorsally, dark brown to black laterally, and yellowish cream ventrally.

== Reproduction ==
D. delasagra is oviparous.
