= Celestus microblepharis =

Conservation status
- Critically Endangered (IUCN 3.1)

Scientific classification
- Kingdom: Animalia
- Phylum: Chordata
- Class: Reptilia
- Order: Squamata
- Suborder: Anguimorpha
- Family: Diploglossidae
- Genus: Celestus
- Species: C. microblepharis

Binomial name
- Celestus microblepharis (Underwood, 1959)

Species of lizard

Celestus microblepharis, the small-eyed galliwasp or tiny eyelid galliwasp, is a species of lizard in the Diploglossidae family. It is found only in Jamaica.
