= Advenus =

Conservation status
- Data Deficient (IUCN 3.1)

Scientific classification
- Kingdom: Animalia
- Phylum: Chordata
- Class: Reptilia
- Order: Squamata
- Suborder: Anguimorpha
- Family: Diploglossidae
- Subfamily: Celestinae
- Genus: Advenus; Schools & Hedges, 2021
- Species: A. montisilvestris

Binomial name
- Advenus montisilvestris (Myers, 1973)

Synonyms
- Diploglossus montesilvestris Myers, 1973; Advenus montisilvestris — Schools & Hedges, 2021

Species of lizard

Advenus montisilvestris, also known commonly as the mountain forest galliwasp, is a species of lizard in the family Diploglossidae. The species is endemic to Panama. It is the only member of the genus Advenus, and it as the only species of the subfamily Celestinae that is found outside of the Caribbean.

== Taxonomy ==
A. montisilvestris was formerly classified in the genus Diploglossus.

== Distribution and habitat ==
A. montisilvestris is native to eastern Panama, where it is found in the montane forests of the Serranía de Pirre mountain range.
