= Montserrat galliwasp =

Conservation status
- Critically Endangered (IUCN 3.1)

Scientific classification
- Kingdom: Animalia
- Phylum: Chordata
- Class: Reptilia
- Order: Squamata
- Suborder: Anguimorpha
- Family: Diploglossidae
- Genus: Diploglossus
- Species: D. montisserrati

Binomial name
- Diploglossus montisserrati Underwood, 1964

Species of lizard

The Montserrat galliwasp (Diploglossus montisserrati) is a critically endangered species of lizard in the Diploglossidae family. The species is endemic to Montserrat, in the Caribbean Lesser Antilles, and is the only species of the family, living or fossil, that has been found in the region.

== Taxonomy ==
The first description of Diploglossus montisserrati was published in 1964 by Garth Underwood. The holotype was collected by John Kingsley Howes, with the type locality being Woodlands Spring, which is located at an elevation of 180 m (600 ft) in the northwestern part of Montserrat. The holotype was the first specimen of the family Diploglossidae, living or fossil, recorded win the Lesser Antilles. According to Underwood, it was to his amazement that he realized the specimen he had been sent was a Diploglossus, and that Kingsley Howes had said he had only seen this type of lizard once before in his life, 25 years prior. According to Underwood, the apparent elusiveness of the species led him to decide to describe the species based off a single specimen.

== Description ==
The holotype had a snout–vent length of 180 mm (7.1 in). It is brown all over, with white speckling on its flanks and legs, subtle dark lines around its neck, and white scales speckled with brown on its upper mouth.

== Distribution and habitat ==
D. montisserrati is endemic to the island of Montserrat. Its population size is unknown, with only 11 confirmed sightings of the species in history, and since 1983 all sightings have been limited to the area near the type locality, Woodland Springs, a moist evergreen forest habitat, and it is thought to no longer be extant on the rest of the island. In addition to being sighted in the forest itself it has also been sighted in gardens adjacent to the forest. The species is listed as critically endangered on the IUCN Red List. The 1995 reawakening of the Soufrière Hills volcano destroyed much of its habitat, and its very limited distribution leaves it vulnerable to further stochastic events. Threats include volcanic activity, habitat loss due to land development and predation by invasive species such as rats, cane toads, feral pigs, dogs, and cats.
