= Diploglossus nigropunctatus =

Conservation status
- Least Concern (IUCN 3.1)

Scientific classification
- Kingdom: Animalia
- Phylum: Chordata
- Class: Reptilia
- Order: Squamata
- Suborder: Anguimorpha
- Family: Diploglossidae
- Genus: Diploglossus
- Species: D. nigropunctatus

Binomial name
- Diploglossus nigropunctatus Barbour & Shreve, 1937

Species of lizard

Diploglossus nigropunctatus, the Cuban spotted galliwasp, is a species of lizard of the Diploglossidae family endemic to Cuba.
