= Ophiodes enso =

Scientific classification
- Kingdom: Animalia
- Phylum: Chordata
- Class: Reptilia
- Order: Squamata
- Suborder: Anguimorpha
- Family: Diploglossidae
- Genus: Ophiodes
- Species: O. enso

Binomial name
- Ophiodes enso Entiauspe-Neto, Marques Quintela, Regnet, Teixeira, Silveira, & Loebmann, 2017

Species of lizard

Ophiodes enso is a species of limbless lizard of the Diploglossidae family. It is found in Brazil.
