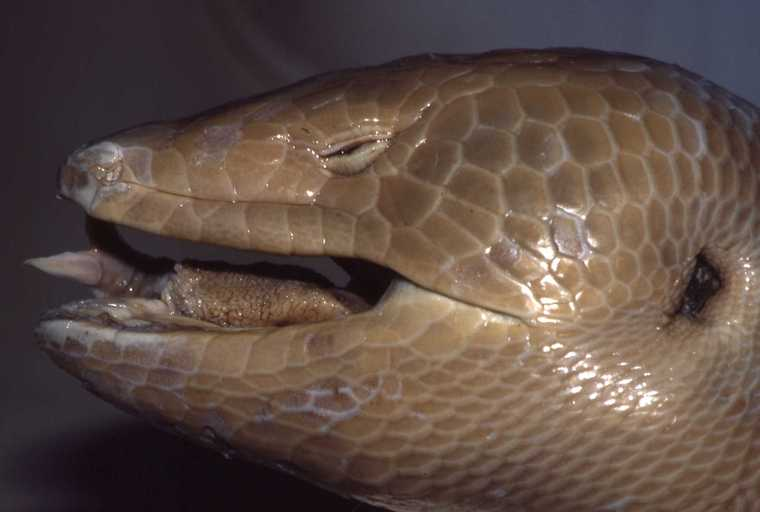
- Museum specimen

Conservation status
- Critically endangered, possibly extinct (IUCN 3.1)

Scientific classification
- Kingdom: Animalia
- Phylum: Chordata
- Class: Reptilia
- Order: Squamata
- Suborder: Anguimorpha
- Family: Diploglossidae
- Genus: Celestus
- Species: C. occiduus

Binomial name
- Celestus occiduus (Shaw, 1802)

Synonyms
- Lacerta occidua Shaw, 1802

= Jamaican giant galliwasp =

Species of lizard

The Jamaican giant galliwasp or sinking galliwasp (Celestus occiduus) is a possibly extinct species of lizard in the Diploglossidae. It was endemic to Jamaica. It was last recorded in mid-19th century. Its population was ravaged and likely exterminated by introduced predators like mongooses. Recent surveys, while extensive, have not yet been exhaustive, given the difficulties of access into and around the Black River Morass, leaving room for some hope that the species may persist.

The Jamaican galliwasp was the largest anguid skink on the island with a head-body length of 32 cms. Early observers noted that lived in holes near swamps and fed on crabs but it more likely lived among rocks and fed on insects. The last record of the species was in 1840. The lizard was stout and the forelimb was a third longer than the head. The tail was laterally compressed and the light brown body had about fifteen cross bands. Around 30 specimens are known in collections around the world.
