= Celestus macrotus =

Conservation status
- Endangered (IUCN 3.1)

Scientific classification
- Kingdom: Animalia
- Phylum: Chordata
- Class: Reptilia
- Order: Squamata
- Suborder: Anguimorpha
- Family: Diploglossidae
- Genus: Celestus
- Species: C. macrotus

Binomial name
- Celestus macrotus Thomas & Hedges, 1989

Species of lizard

Celestus macrotus, La Selle galliwasp or Thomas's galliwasp, is a species of lizard of the family Diploglossidae. It is found in Haiti.
