= Ophiodes fragilis =

Conservation status
- Least Concern (IUCN 3.1)

Scientific classification
- Kingdom: Animalia
- Phylum: Chordata
- Class: Reptilia
- Order: Squamata
- Suborder: Anguimorpha
- Family: Diploglossidae
- Genus: Ophiodes
- Species: O. fragilis

Binomial name
- Ophiodes fragilis (Raddi, 1820)

Species of lizard

Ophiodes fragilis, the fragile worm lizard, is a species of limbless lizard of the Diploglossidae family. It is found in Argentina, Paraguay, and Brazil.
