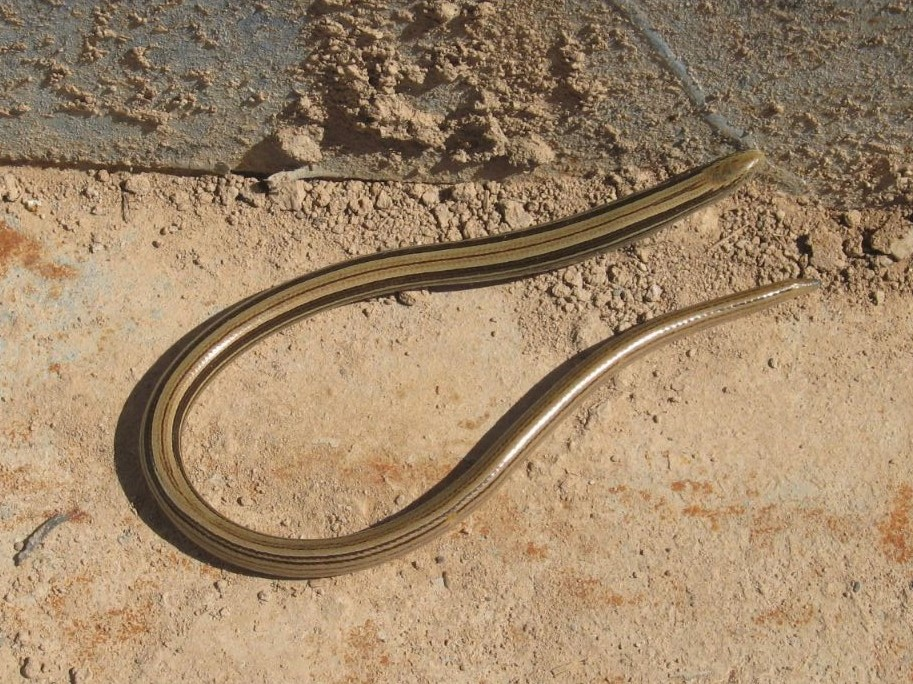

Conservation status
- Least Concern (IUCN 3.1)

Scientific classification
- Kingdom: Animalia
- Phylum: Chordata
- Class: Reptilia
- Order: Squamata
- Suborder: Anguimorpha
- Family: Diploglossidae
- Genus: Ophiodes
- Species: O. vertebralis

Binomial name
- Ophiodes vertebralis Bocourt, 1881

= Ophiodes vertebralis =

Species of lizard

Ophiodes vertebralis, the jointed worm lizard, is a species of limbless lizard of the Diploglossidae family. It is found in Brazil, Argentina, and Uruguay.
