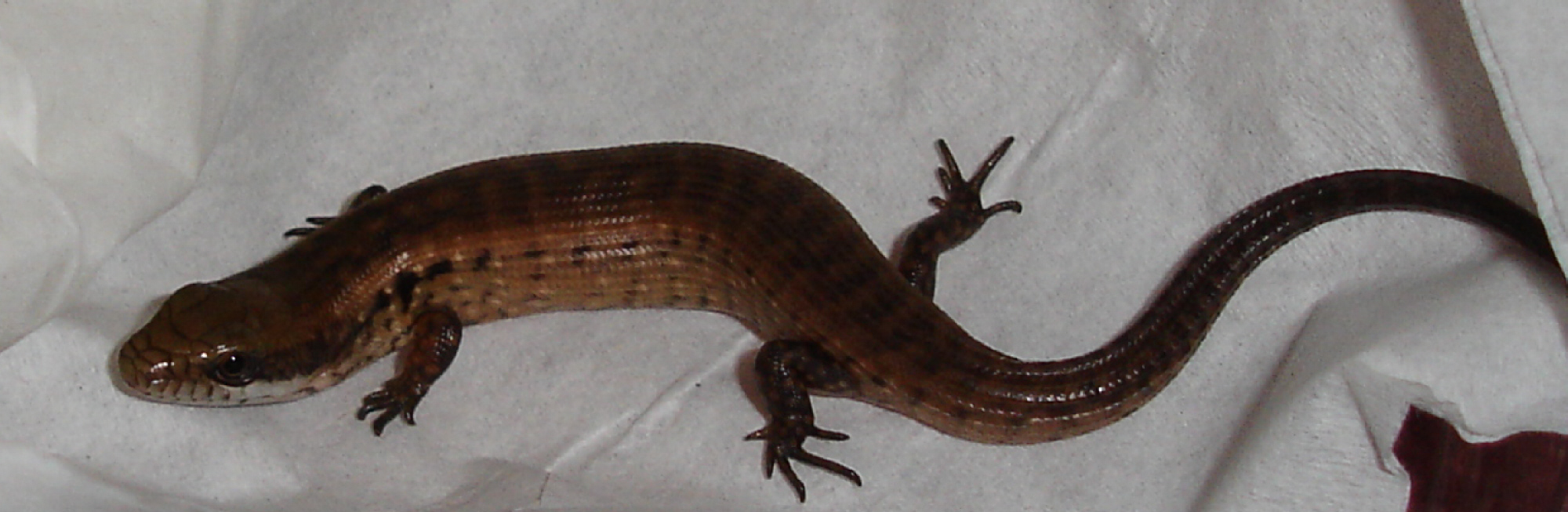
- Haitian giant galliwasp (C. warreni) juvenile

Scientific classification
- Kingdom: Animalia
- Phylum: Chordata
- Class: Reptilia
- Order: Squamata
- Suborder: Anguimorpha
- Family: Diploglossidae
- Subfamily: Celestinae
- Genus: Caribicus; Schools & Hedges, 2021

Species
- C. anelpistus; C. darlingtoni; C. warreni

= Caribicus =

Genus of reptiles

Caribicus is a genus of diploglossid lizards endemic to the island of Hispaniola in the Caribbean, in both the Dominican Republic and Haiti.

== Conservation ==
All three species are considered threatened on the IUCN Red List, and one was considered possibly extinct before a recent rediscovery.

== Taxonomy ==
There are three species in this genus, all of which were formerly classified in the genus Celestus.

== Species ==
- Caribicus anelpistus (Schwartz, Graham & Duval, 1979) - Altagracia giant galliwasp
- Caribicus darlingtoni (Cochran, 1939) - Hispaniolan striped galliwasp
- Caribicus warreni (Schwartz, 1970) - Haitian giant galliwasp
