= Celestus striatus =

Scientific classification
- Kingdom: Animalia
- Phylum: Chordata
- Class: Reptilia
- Order: Squamata
- Suborder: Anguimorpha
- Family: Diploglossidae
- Genus: Celestus
- Species: C. striatus

Binomial name
- Celestus striatus JE Gray, 1839

Species of lizard

Celestus striatus is a species of lizard of the Diploglossidae family. It is possibly found in Jamaica.
