= Sauresia =

Conservation status
- Least Concern (IUCN 3.1)

Scientific classification
- Kingdom: Animalia
- Phylum: Chordata
- Class: Reptilia
- Order: Squamata
- Suborder: Anguimorpha
- Family: Diploglossidae
- Subfamily: Celestinae
- Genus: Sauresia; Gray, 1852
- Species: S. sepsoides

Binomial name
- Sauresia sepsoides Gray, 1852
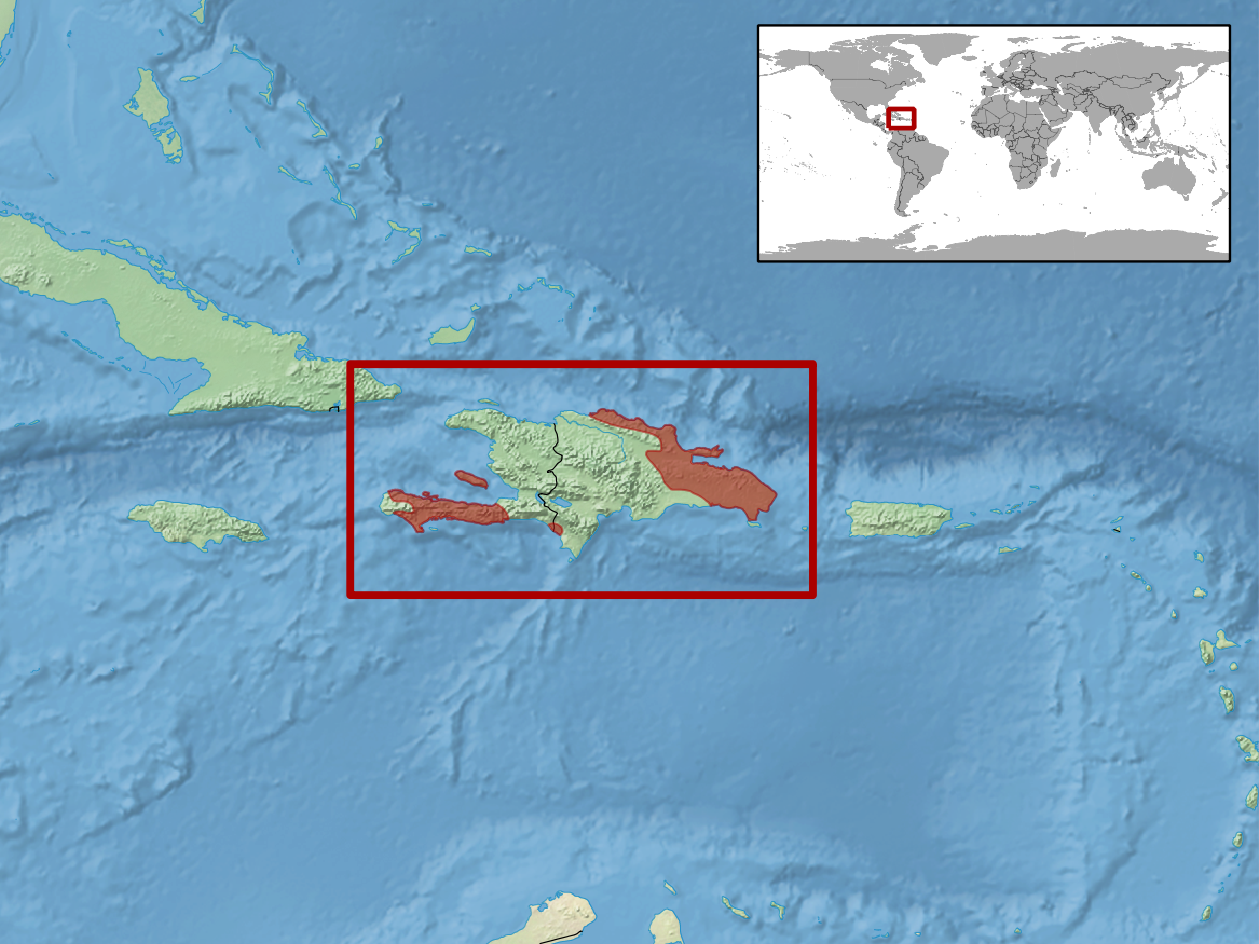

Synonyms
- Celestus sepsoides (Gray, 1852); Embryopus habichii (Weinland, 1863)

Species of lizard

Sauresia sepsoides, the Hispaniolan four-toed galliwasp or common four-toed galliwasp, is a species of lizard of the Diploglossidae family endemic to the Caribbean island of Hispaniola (in both the Dominican Republic and Haiti). It is the only member of the genus Sauresia.

== Taxonomy ==
It was formerly classified in the genus Celestus, but was moved back to Sauresia in 2021.
