= Celestus hewardi =

Conservation status
- Endangered (IUCN 3.1)

Scientific classification
- Kingdom: Animalia
- Phylum: Chordata
- Class: Reptilia
- Order: Squamata
- Suborder: Anguimorpha
- Family: Diploglossidae
- Genus: Celestus
- Species: C. hewardi

Binomial name
- Celestus hewardi Gray, 1845

Synonyms
- Celestus hewardii Gray, 1845; Diploglossus (Celestus) variegatus W. Peters, 1874; Diploglossus hewardii Boulenger, 1885; Celestus occiduus hewardii Grant, 1940; Celestus hewardi Schwartz & Henderson, 1991; Celestus hewardii Schools & Hedges, 2021

Species of lizard

Celestus hewardi, also known commonly as Heward's galliwasp, the red-spotted galliwasp, and the three-streaked galliwasp, is a species of lizard in the family Diploglossidae. The species is endemic to Jamaica.

== Etymology ==
The specific name, hewardi, is in honor of British botanist Robert Heward.

== Habitat ==
The preferred natural habitat of C. hewardi is forest, at altitudes of 120–718 m (394–2,356 ft).

== Description ==
Moderately large-sized for its genus, C. hewardi may attain a snout-to-vent length (SVL) of 132 mm (5.2 in). The limbs are relatively long. The nasal is excluded from the frontal. The dorsal scales are keeled and striate. The ventrals are smooth to weakly striate, and number 113–135 between the mental and the vent. There are 49–59 scales around the body at midbody. There are 15–19 lamellae on the underside of the fourth toe. There is an angular subocular usually between supralabials seven and eight, less frequently between six and seven. The dorsal ground color is greenish tan-brown to very dark brown (almost black) or metallic tan, with or without dirty gray, median nuchal and postocular streaks. The middorsal spots are reddish brown to bronze. The flanks and sides of head are marked with alternating bars of black and green to yellow-green. The top of the head is olive and patternless. The limbs are flecked with metallic tan. Vertical subocular and loreal lines are absent. The labials and the throat are mottled or flecked with brown to black on a yellow-green to dull blue ground color extending as far posteriorly as the forelimb insertions. The dorsum of the tail is colored like the body, but distally has light bands of pale blue. The venter or underside of the tail is orange (Schwartz & Henderson 1991: 374).

== Behavior ==
C. hewardi is terrestrial.

== Diet ==
C. hewardi preys predominately upon slugs.

== Reproduction ==
C. hewardi is ovoviviparous.
