= Celestus macrolepis =

Scientific classification
- Kingdom: Animalia
- Phylum: Chordata
- Class: Reptilia
- Order: Squamata
- Suborder: Anguimorpha
- Family: Diploglossidae
- Genus: Celestus
- Species: C. macrolepis

Binomial name
- Celestus macrolepis JE Gray, 1845

Species of lizard

Celestus macrolepis is a species of lizard of the Diploglossidae family. It is found possibly in Jamaica.
