= Diploglossus microlepis =

Conservation status
- Data Deficient (IUCN 3.1)

Scientific classification
- Kingdom: Animalia
- Phylum: Chordata
- Class: Reptilia
- Order: Squamata
- Suborder: Anguimorpha
- Family: Diploglossidae
- Genus: Diploglossus
- Species: D. microlepis

Binomial name
- Diploglossus microlepis (JE Gray, 1831)

Synonyms
- Tiliqua microlepis Gray in Griffith, 1831

Species of lizard

Diploglossus microlepis, the small-lipped galliwasp, is a species of lizard of the Diploglossidae family. Almost nothing is known about this species, as the holotype, captured in 1831, has no geographic note.
