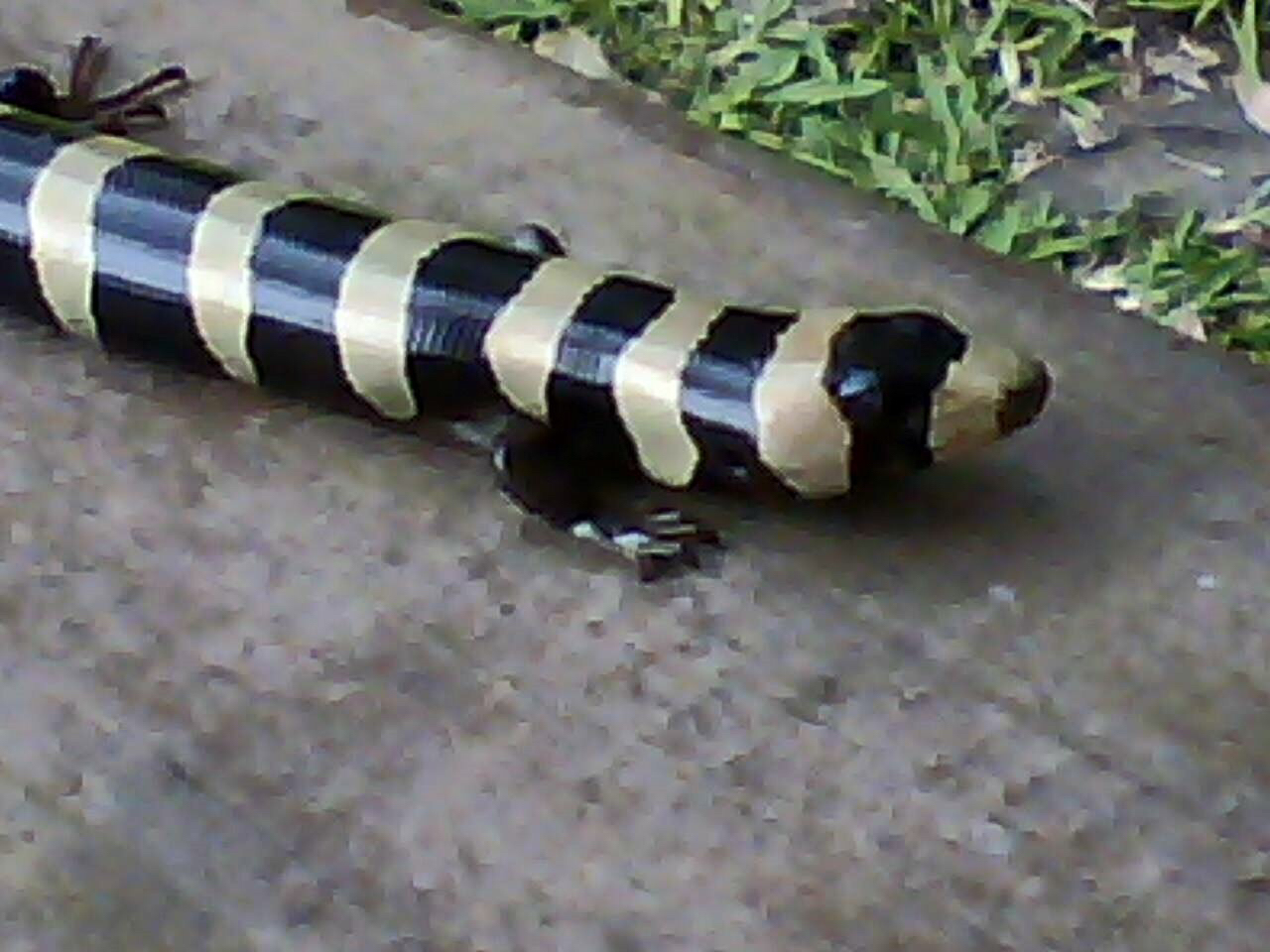

Conservation status
- Least Concern (IUCN 3.1)

Scientific classification
- Kingdom: Animalia
- Phylum: Chordata
- Class: Reptilia
- Order: Squamata
- Suborder: Anguimorpha
- Family: Diploglossidae
- Genus: Diploglossus
- Species: D. fasciatus

Binomial name
- Diploglossus fasciatus (JE Gray, 1831)

= Diploglossus fasciatus =

Species of lizard

Diploglossus fasciatus, the banded galliwasp, is a species of lizard of the family Diploglossidae. It is found in Brazil, Bolivia, and Peru.
