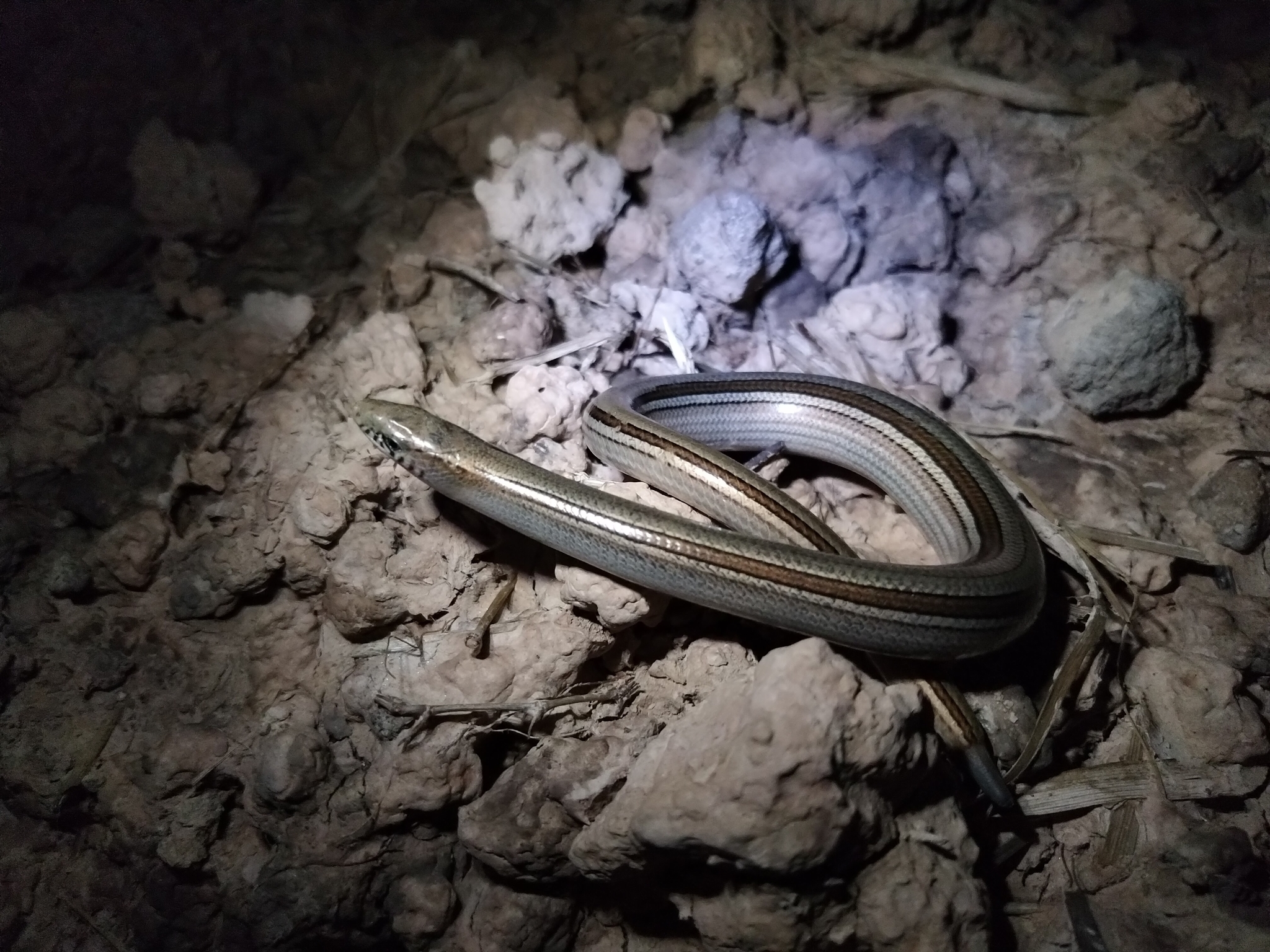

Conservation status
- Least Concern (IUCN 3.1)

Scientific classification
- Kingdom: Animalia
- Phylum: Chordata
- Class: Reptilia
- Order: Squamata
- Suborder: Anguimorpha
- Family: Diploglossidae
- Genus: Ophiodes
- Species: O. intermedius

Binomial name
- Ophiodes intermedius Boulenger, 1894

= Ophiodes intermedius =

Species of lizard

Ophiodes intermedius is a species of lizard of the Diploglossidae family. It is found in Argentina, Paraguay, Uruguay, and Bolivia.
