= Celestus barbouri =

Conservation status
- Endangered (IUCN 3.1)

Scientific classification
- Kingdom: Animalia
- Phylum: Chordata
- Class: Reptilia
- Order: Squamata
- Suborder: Anguimorpha
- Family: Diploglossidae
- Genus: Celestus
- Species: C. barbouri

Binomial name
- Celestus barbouri Grant, 1940

Synonyms
- Celestus barbouri Grant, 1940; Diploglossus barbouri Schwartz & Thomas, 1975; Celestus barbouri Schwartz & Henderson, 1991

Species of lizard

Celestus barbouri, also known commonly as Barbour's galliwasp and the limestone forest galliwasp, is a species of lizard in the family Diploglossidae. The species is endemic to Jamaica.

== Etymology ==
The specific name, barbouri, is in honor of American herpetologist Thomas Barbour.

== Geographic range ==
C. barbouri is found in central and northern Jamaica.

== Habitat ==
The preferred natural habitat of C. barbouri is forest, at altitudes of 600 m (2,000 ft) and higher.

== Description ==
Moderate-sized for its genus, C. barbouri has a snout-to-vent length (SVL) of about 10 cm (3.9 in).

== Reproduction ==
C. barbouri is ovoviviparous.
