= Ophiodes luciae =

Scientific classification
- Kingdom: Animalia
- Phylum: Chordata
- Class: Reptilia
- Order: Squamata
- Suborder: Anguimorpha
- Family: Diploglossidae
- Genus: Ophiodes
- Species: O. luciae

Binomial name
- Ophiodes luciae Cacciali & Scott, 2015

Species of lizard

Ophiodes luciae, Lucy’s worm lizard, is a species of lizard of the Diploglossidae family. It is found in Paraguay.
