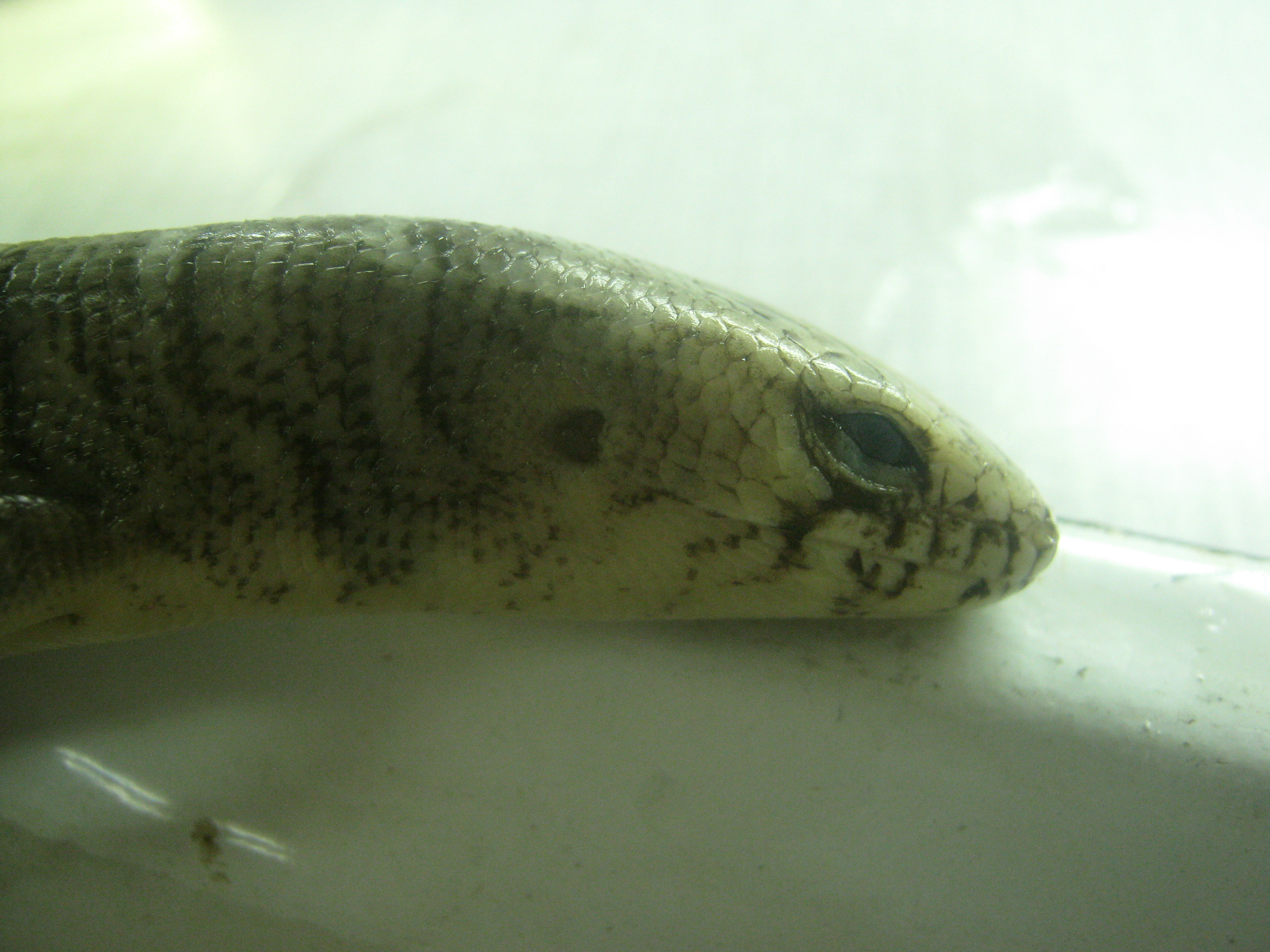

Conservation status
- Least Concern (IUCN 3.1)

Scientific classification
- Kingdom: Animalia
- Phylum: Chordata
- Class: Reptilia
- Order: Squamata
- Suborder: Anguimorpha
- Family: Diploglossidae
- Genus: Diploglossus
- Species: D. monotropis

Binomial name
- Diploglossus monotropis (Kuhl, 1820)

= Diploglossus monotropis =

Species of lizard

Diploglossus monotropis is a species of lizard of the Diploglossidae family. It is found in Costa Rica, Panama, Colombia, and Nicaragua.
