= Wetmorena =

Scientific classification
- Kingdom: Animalia
- Phylum: Chordata
- Class: Reptilia
- Order: Squamata
- Suborder: Anguimorpha
- Family: Diploglossidae
- Subfamily: Celestinae
- Genus: Wetmorena; Cochran, 1927

Species
- W. agasepsoides; W. haetiana

Genus of reptiles

Wetmorena is a genus of diploglossid lizards endemic to the island of Hispaniola in the Caribbean, occurring in both the Dominican Republic and Haiti.

== Taxonomy ==
There are two species, both of which were formerly classified in the genus Celestus until the genus Wetmorena was revived for them in 2021.

== Conservation ==
Both species in the genus are endangered.

== Etymology ==
The genus was named after American ornithologist Alexander Wetmore.

== Species ==
- Wetmorena agasepsoides (Thomas, 1971) – serpentine four-toed galliwasp
- Wetmorena haetiana Cochran, 1927 – Hispaniolan earless galliwasp or earless galliwasp
