= Celestus fowleri =

Conservation status
- Vulnerable (IUCN 3.1)

Scientific classification
- Kingdom: Animalia
- Phylum: Chordata
- Class: Reptilia
- Order: Squamata
- Suborder: Anguimorpha
- Family: Diploglossidae
- Genus: Celestus
- Species: C. fowleri

Binomial name
- Celestus fowleri (Schwartz, 1971)

Synonyms
- Diploglossus fowleri Schwartz, 1971; Celestus fowleri Schwartz & Henderson, 1991

Species of lizard

Celestus fowleri, also known commonly as the bromeliad galliwasp and Fowler's galliwasp, is a species of lizard in the family Diploglossidae. The species is endemic to Jamaica.

== Etymology ==
The specific name, fowleri, is in honor of American herpetologist Danny C. Fowler.

== Geographic range ==
C. fowleri is found only in northwestern Jamaica, in Trelawny Parish.

== Habitat ==
The preferred natural habitat of C. fowleri is forest, at an altitude of 160 m (520 ft).

== Behavior ==
C. fowleri shelters in bromeliads at up to 2.5 m (8.2 ft) above the forest floor.

== Reproduction ==
C. fowleri is ovoviviparous.
