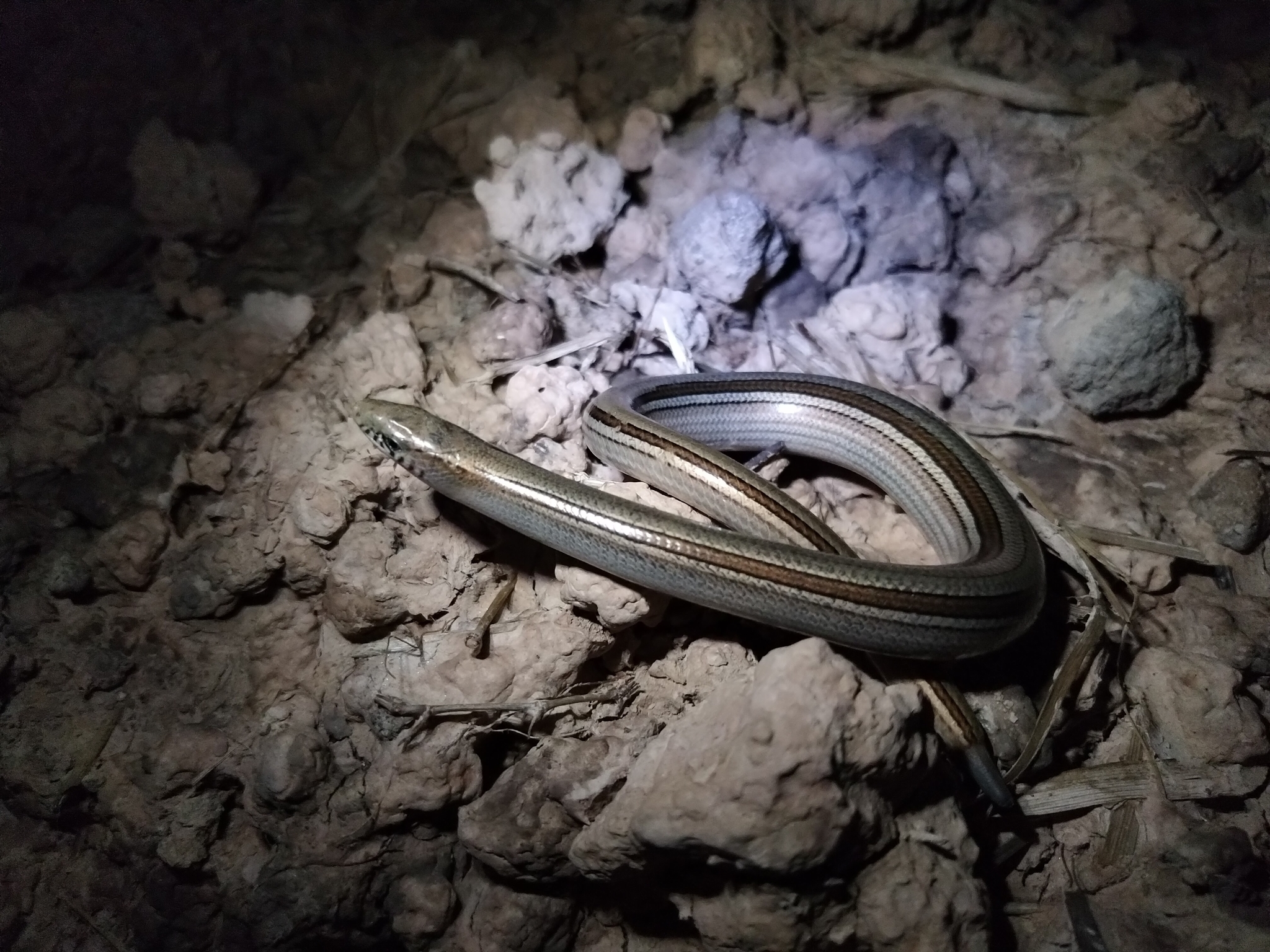
- Ophiodes intermedius

Scientific classification
- Kingdom: Animalia
- Phylum: Chordata
- Class: Reptilia
- Order: Squamata
- Suborder: Anguimorpha
- Family: Diploglossidae
- Subfamily: Diploglossinae
- Genus: Ophiodes; Wagler, 1828

Diversity
- Six species (see text)

= Ophiodes =

Genus of lizards

Ophiodes is a genus of South American legless lizards in the family Diploglossidae.

== Species ==
Ophiodes contains six species.

- Ophiodes enso Entiauspe-Neto, Quintela, Regnet, Teixeira, Silveira & Loebmann, 2017
- Ophiodes fragilis (Raddi, 1820) – fragile worm lizard
- Ophiodes intermedius Boulenger, 1894
- Ophiodes luciae Cacciali & Scott, 2015 – Lucy’s worm lizard
- Ophiodes striatus (Spix, 1824) – striped worm lizard
- Ophiodes vertebralis Bocourt, 1881 – jointed worm lizard

Nota bene: A binomial authority in parentheses indicates that the species was originally described in a genus other than Ophiodes.
