= Las Caritas =

Indian rock inscriptions in the Dominican Republic

Coordinates: 18.56°N 71.6877°W

Las Caritas ("The faces") is a collection of Indigenous inscriptions in a rock formation looking out over Lake Enriquillo in the Dominican Republic. The place is also called the Trono de Enriquillo ("Enriquillo's throne") because it is said the cacique Enriquillo used to camp here during his rebellion.

== Gallery ==
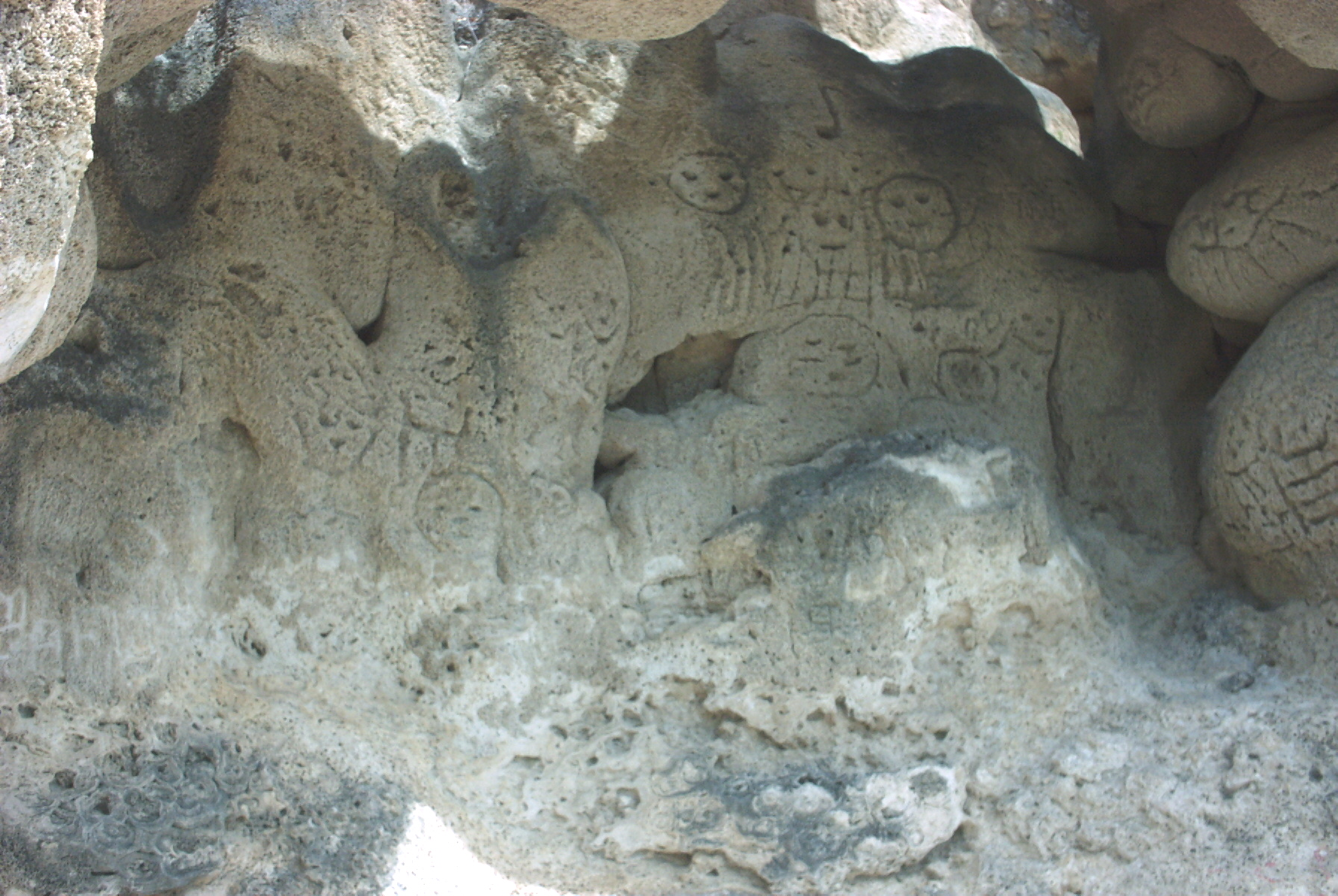
The faces are carved in porous rock.

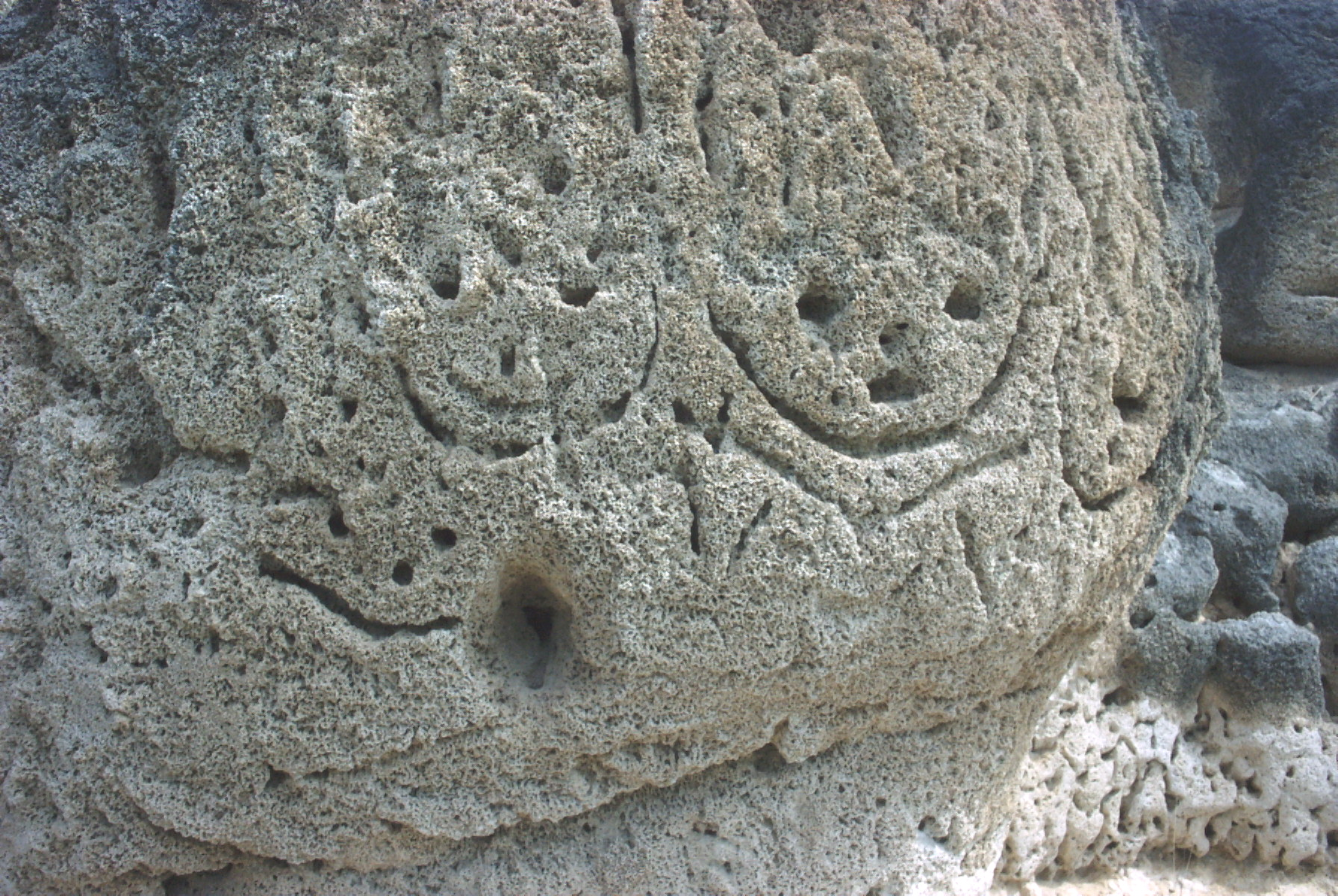
Close-up.
