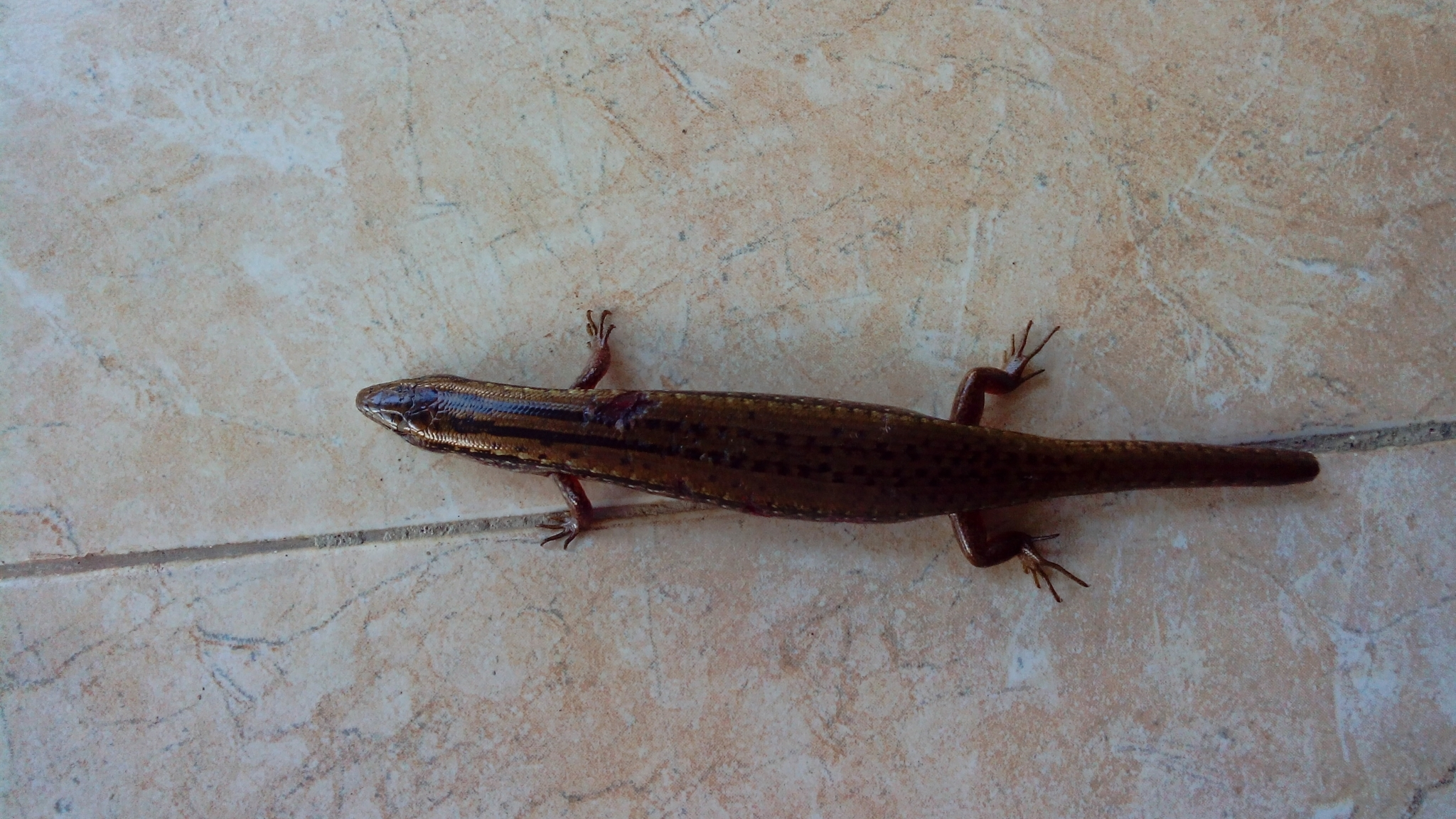
- Cope's galliwasp (C. stenurus)

Scientific classification
- Kingdom: Animalia
- Phylum: Chordata
- Class: Reptilia
- Order: Squamata
- Suborder: Anguimorpha
- Family: Diploglossidae
- Subfamily: Celestinae
- Genus: Comptus; Schools & Hedges, 2021

Species
- C. badius; C. maculatus; C. stenurus

= Comptus =

Genus of reptiles

Comptus is a genus of diploglossid lizards native to the West Indies.

== Taxonomy ==
All three species were previously classified in the genus Celestus.

=== Species ===
There are three species in the genus, all of which are widely geographically separated from each other on different islands:

- Comptus badius (Cope, 1868) – Navassa galliwasp
- Comptus maculatus (Garman, 1888) – Cayman galliwasp
- Comptus stenurus (Cope, 1862) – Hispaniolan keeled galliwasp or Cope's galliwasp
