= Enriquillo =

Indigenous cacique who rebelled against the Spaniards from 1519 to 1533

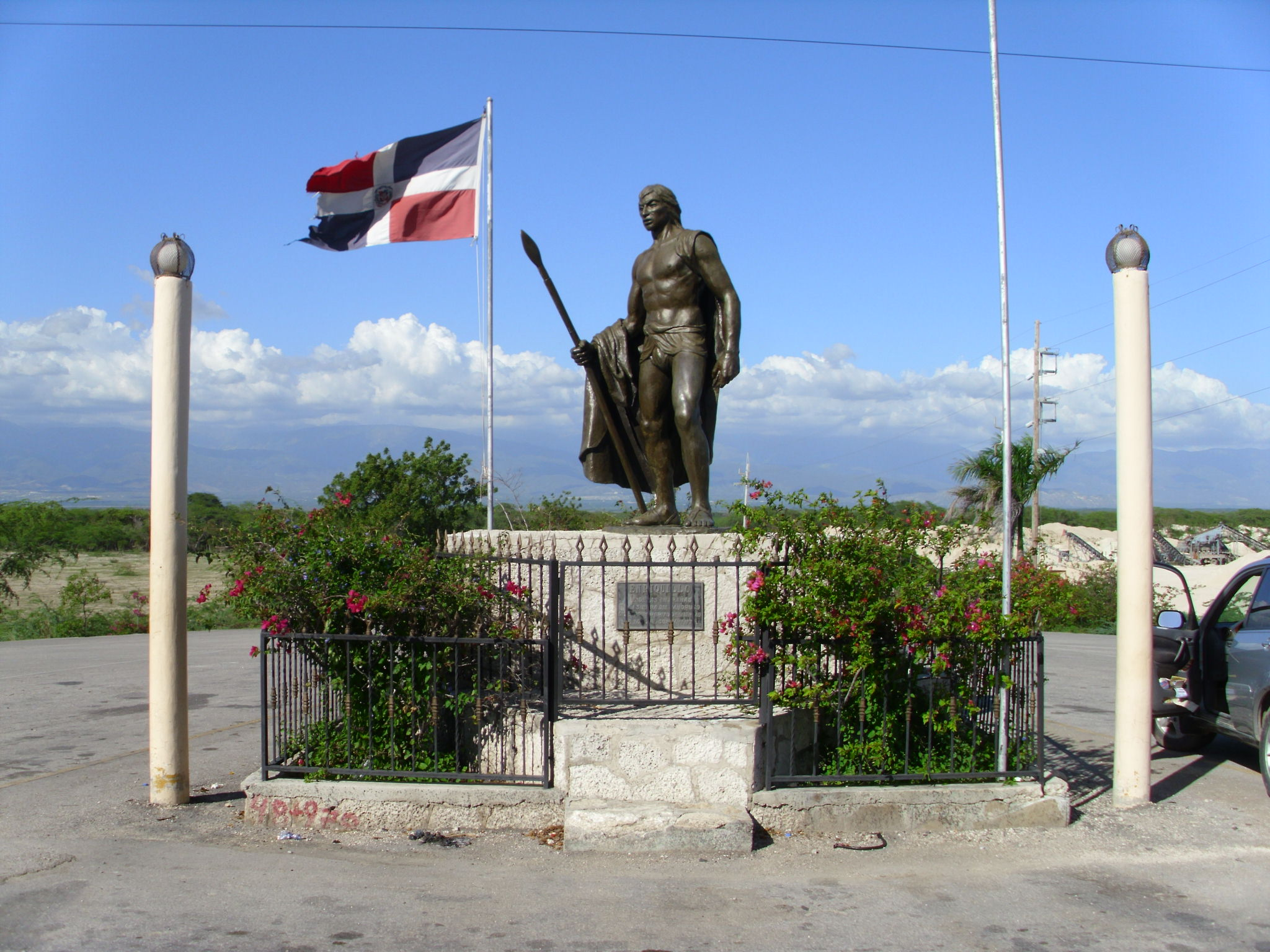
Statue of Enriquillo in Independencia province, Dominican Republic

Enrique (1498–1535), best known as Enriquillo, was an Indigenous cacique (Taíno chief) who rebelled against Spanish colonists between 1519 and 1533. Enriquillo's rebellion is the best known rebellion of the early Caribbean period. He was born on the shores of Lake Jaragua (today Lake Enriquillo) and was part of the royal family of Jaragua. Enriquillo's aunt Anacaona was Queen of Jaragua, and his father Magiocatex was the crown prince. He is considered a hero in the modern day Dominican Republic for his resistance in favor of the Indigenous peoples. Dominican friar Bartolomé de las Casas, who documented and rallied against Spanish abuse of the native peoples, wrote sympathetically of Enriquillo.

== Early life ==
Enriquillo was born on the shores of Lake Jaragua (currently Lake Enriquillo in Dominican Republic), around 1500. He was a part of the Taíno people, who had an advanced government, cultural traditions, and agricultural practices.

Good relations between Christopher Columbus and the Indigenous Taíno of the large island Columbus called Hispaniola did not last more than a few days. The Taínos were forced into terrible conditions as laborers in gold mining operations, badly housed in the mountains, poorly fed, extremely overworked, and forced to live in close quarters with the Spaniards. Additionally, due to taking men away from the villages, the cycle of food production was disrupted, causing widespread malnutrition. This malnutrition further aided the Taínos' vulnerability to deadly new types of diseases introduced by the foreigners. After Columbus tortured and killed many in his quest for gold, he turned to slavery and sugar cane plantations as a way to profit from his voyages.

Enriquillo's father, his aunt Anacaona, and eighty other regional chieftains were killed by Nicolás de Ovando while attending supposed "peace talks" with the Spanish in Jaragua. During the talks, Spanish soldiers ambushed the chieftains, also known as caciques, set the meeting house on fire, and then proceeded to kill anyone who fled the flames (causing his father's death). Enriquillo, an orphan, was later raised in a Santo Domingo monastery and given the name of "Enrico". One of his mentors was Bartolomé de las Casas. De las Casas was a Spanish Roman Catholic Priest focused on the rights of Native Americans. Enriquillo owned a steed and could read and write Castilian. He was aware of his privileges or rights as a subject of the colony and was still recognized as a chief or nitaíno by the other Indigenous people. For this reason, he served as a foreman for the encomendero.

Enriquillo also had a wife, called Mencía, later with the noble title Doña due to Enriquillo's high standing and relations with the Spaniards. She was raped by a Spaniard named Valenzuela. When Enriquillo tried to take the issue to the Spanish courts, nothing could be done, since it was Doña Mencia's word against the Spaniard's word. This, according to some writers, was the tipping point for Enriquillo which led to his revolt in the Bahoruco mountains.

== Rebellion ==
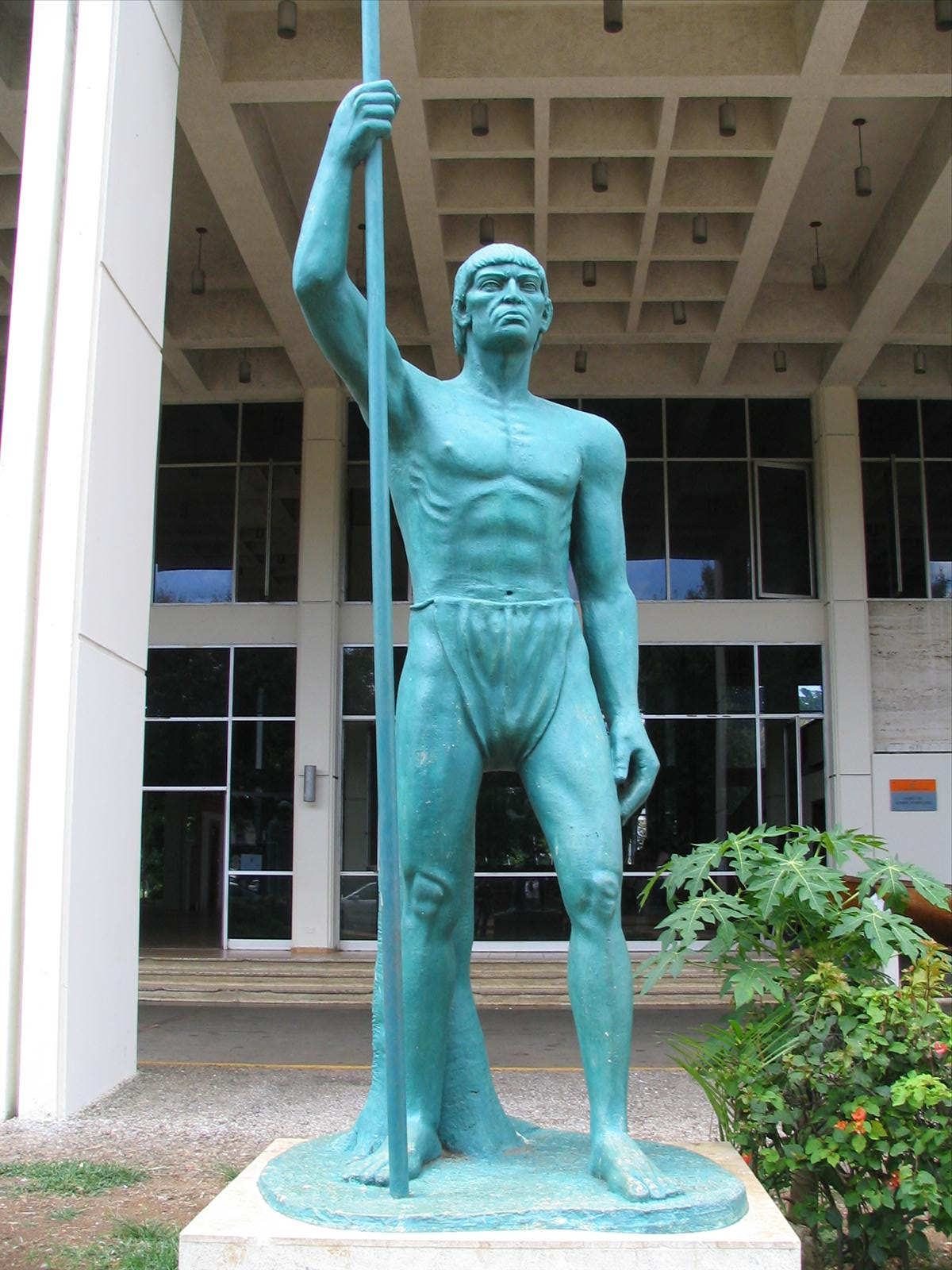
Statue of Enriquillo, Museum of the Dominican Man

Several revolts followed in the first half of the 16th century; the most famous began in 1519. Enriquillo, one of the few remaining caciques, or indigenous chiefs, started the revolt with a large number of Taínos from the mountain range of Bahoruco. The Tainos were able to continue the rebellion because of their better knowledge of the region. As the Spaniards were not able to control the rebellion, a treaty was signed granting to the Native population among others the right of Freedom and of Possession. It had little consequences, however, as by this time the Native population was rapidly declining due to European diseases.

Thirteen years of insurrection of the Bahoruco chieftain cost the Spanish monarchy more than 40,000 gold pesos. Assaults, fires, raids, death of Spaniards and a dangerous example for the slaves, who by the end of the 1520s numbered thousands in the southern part of the island, dedicated to the production of sugar cane. His style of fighting and the method that he applied of irregular warfare and his cunning, patience and prudence; the efficient information and supply service that he organized in the region, in the high mountains of the Sierra, made him feared by the Spaniards. A true military leader, a great captain, capable of facing and defeating the representatives of the most powerful nation in the world at that time. Their resistance forced the King of Spain to commission Francisco de Barrionuevo to put an end, by means of negotiation or force, to the long conflict that unsettled the colony.

Enrique del Bahoruco, as he was originally known, received Barrionuevo, in his first interview, bearing a letter from Carlos and, on Cabritos Island. Those agreements were never fully executed; the Cacique assumed a peaceful attitude from that moment on. He never came down from the mountains and although there is talk of a visit to Santo Domingo accompanied by his wife, nothing confirms that fact. By the success of his negotiations, he became the “Liberator of the Quisqueyanos”.

According to sources, the chief Enriquillo settled in the area that is today the province of Monte Plata, and lived in the town of Boya, now known as Sabana Grande de Boya, where he died. The tomb of the Liberator became a place of pilgrimage by the natives and for this reason the Spaniards decided to build the church of Agua Santa in the community of Boya in the Province of Monte Plata over his tomb, to dislocate the true place of the sanctuary of such a leader. It is also stated that the Cacique died around 1536 of about 40 years of age.

== Guarocuya ==
Most historians agree (see Sued Badillo and others) that Enriquillo was the same person as the cacique Guarocuya which would mean that Enriquillo belonged to the highest house of the Jaragua cacicazgo. Guarocuya was the nephew of Anacaona, sister to the cacique of Jaragua Bohechío and his eventual successor once Bohechío was killed. Anacaona was married to Caonabo, who was the cacique of the neighboring Maguana kingdom. A minority of historians, however, claim that Guarocuya was captured and hanged, while Enriquillo succeeded in his revolt. Most historians believe both rebels were the same person, arguing that the tales of Guarocuya's demise are identical to the more verifiable accounts of the capture and execution of his aunt Anacaona. It is also well documented that the character of Enriquillo was married to Mencía, the mestiza granddaughter of Anacaona.

His name, Enriquillo, would come after his baptism as a Catholic. The name Enriquillo, "little Enrique," was probably due to his age at the time of the baptism.

== Lake Enriquillo ==
The salt water lake Lake Enriquillo in the Dominican province of Baoruco was named after him. Looking out over it is the Trono de Enriquillo, where he is said to have camped during the rebellion.

== Legacy ==
The highest rank of the Asociación de Scouts Dominicanos was formerly named after him.

A new genus of lizard, Guarocuyus, was described in 2022 from Jaragua National Park, and named in honor of Enriquillo's likely Taíno name, Guarocuya.

== See also ==
- Hispaniola
- History of the Dominican Republic
- Taíno opposition against the Spanish
- Population history of American indigenous peoples
