= Celestus crusculus =

Conservation status
- Least Concern (IUCN 3.1)

Scientific classification
- Kingdom: Animalia
- Phylum: Chordata
- Class: Reptilia
- Order: Squamata
- Suborder: Anguimorpha
- Family: Diploglossidae
- Genus: Celestus
- Species: C. crusculus

Binomial name
- Celestus crusculus (Garman, 1887)

Species of lizard

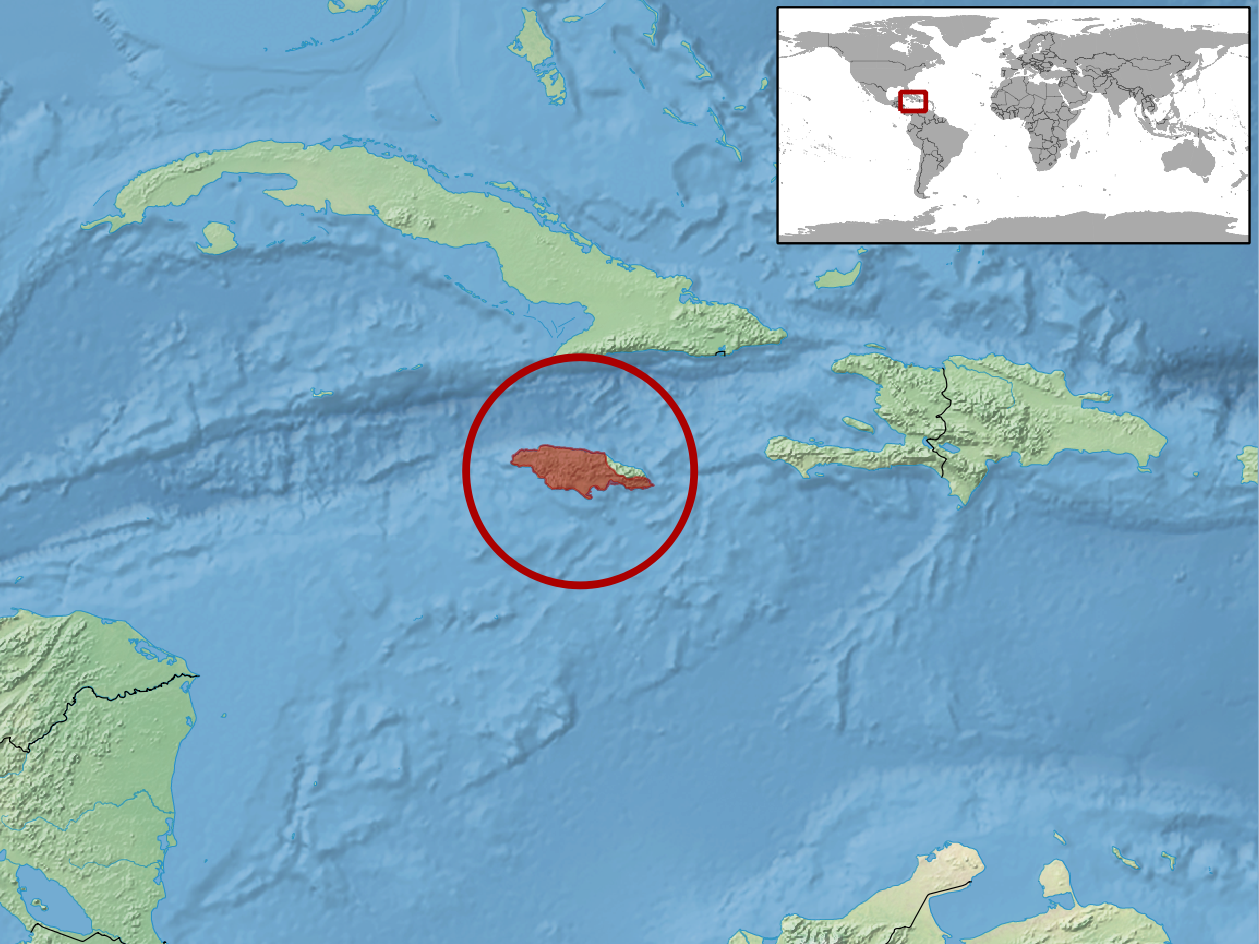
Geographic distribution of Celestus crusculus (Native to Jamaica)

Celestus crusculus, the Jamaican galliwasp or Garman's galliwasp, is a species of lizard of the Diploglossidae family. It is found in Jamaica.
