= Celestus molesworthi =

Conservation status
- Endangered (IUCN 3.1)

Scientific classification
- Kingdom: Animalia
- Phylum: Chordata
- Class: Reptilia
- Order: Squamata
- Suborder: Anguimorpha
- Family: Diploglossidae
- Genus: Celestus
- Species: C. molesworthi

Binomial name
- Celestus molesworthi Grant, 1940

Species of lizard

Celestus molesworthi, the Jamaican galliwasp or Garman's galliwasp, is a species of lizard of the Diploglossidae family. It is found in Jamaica.
