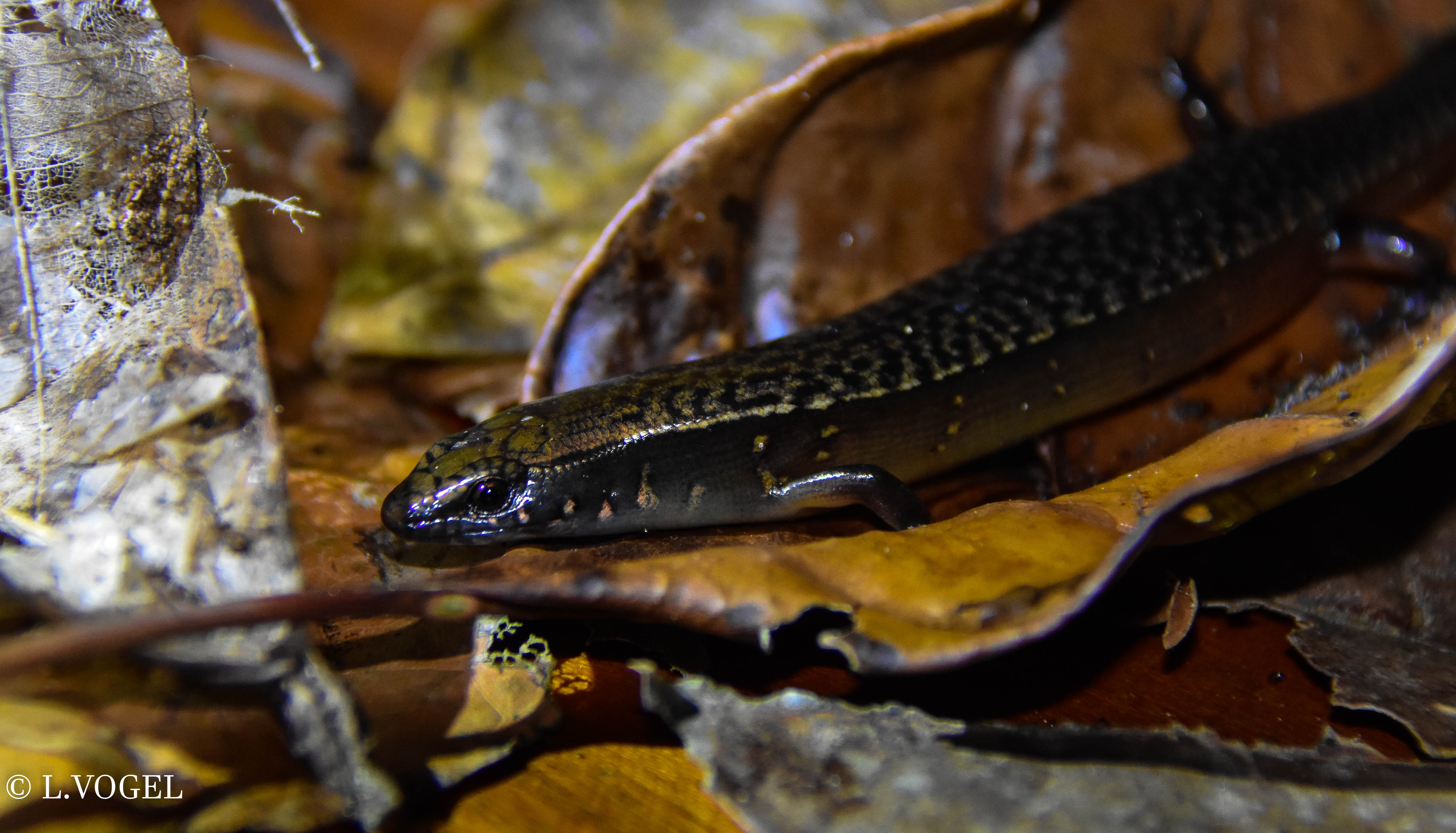

Conservation status
- Least Concern (IUCN 3.1)

Scientific classification
- Kingdom: Animalia
- Phylum: Chordata
- Class: Reptilia
- Order: Squamata
- Suborder: Anguimorpha
- Family: Diploglossidae
- Genus: Mesoamericus; Schools & Hedges, 2021
- Species: M. bilobatus

Binomial name
- Mesoamericus bilobatus (O'Shaughnessy, 1874)

Synonyms
- Celestus bilobatus O'Shaughnessy, 1874; Diploglossus bilobatus — Bocourt, 1874; Mesoamericus bilobatus — Schools & Hedges, 2021

= Mesoamericus =

Species of lizard

Mesoamericus bilobatus, also known commonly as O'Shaughnessy's galliwasp, is a species of lizard in the family Diploglossidae. The species is native to Central America.

== Taxonomy ==
A 2021 study found M. bilobatus to not belong to the genus Diploglossus (which is otherwise only found in South America and the Caribbean), but rather to belong to the monotypic genus Mesoamericus in the subfamily Siderolamprinae.

== Geographic range ==
M. bilobatus is found in Costa Rica, Nicaragua, and Panama.

== Habitat ==
The preferred natural habitat of M. bilobatus is forest, at altitudes of 2–1,360 m (6.6–4,461.9 ft).

== Description ==
M. bilobatus has sheathed claws, which Boulenger (1885) described as "claws nearly entirely concealed in a large compressed sheath formed of a larger supero-lateral and a smaller inferior scale".

== Behavior ==
M. bilobatus is diurnal, terrestrial, and semifossorial.

== Reproduction ==
M. bilobatus is oviparous.
