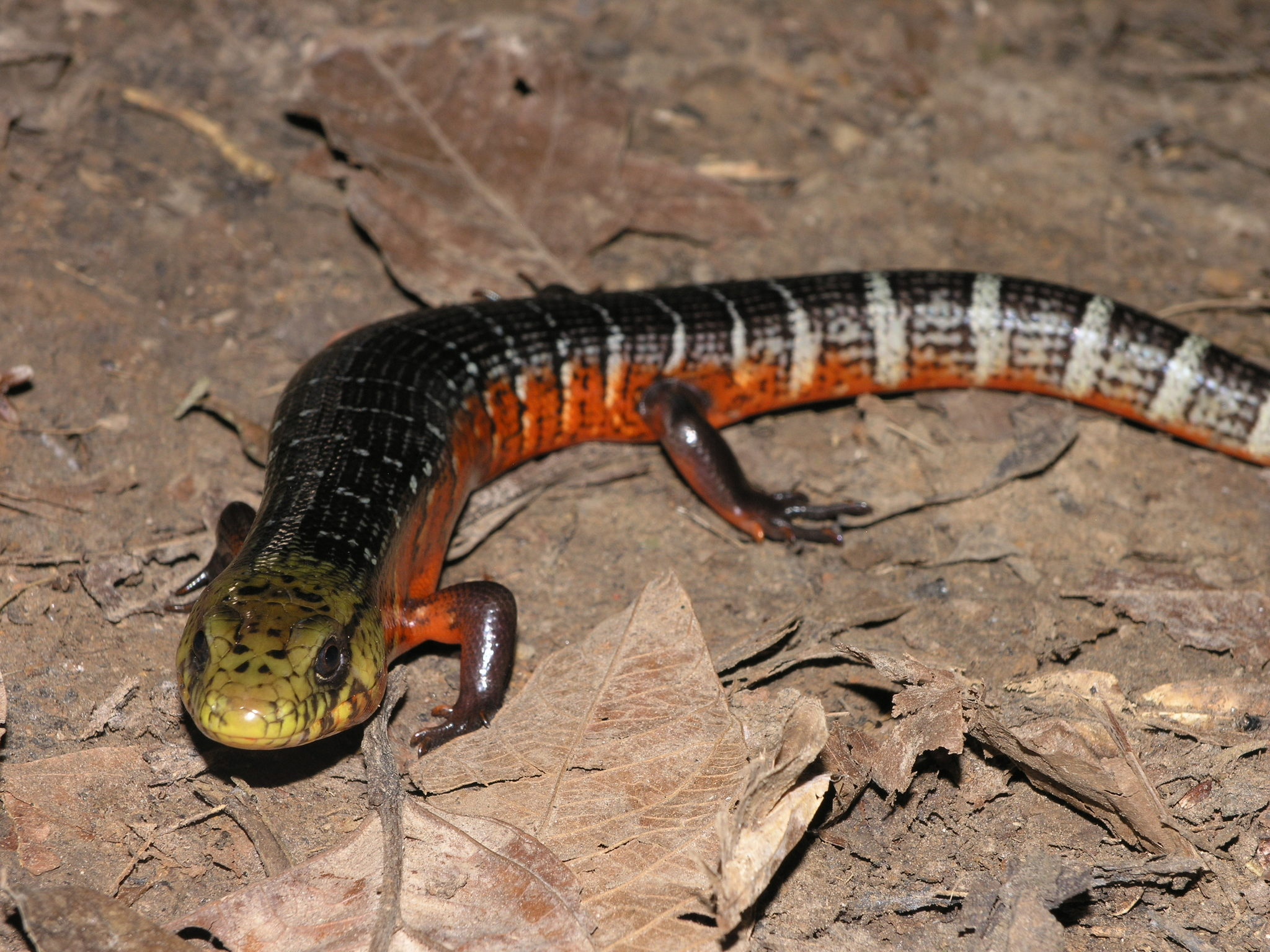
- Diploglossus monotropis

Scientific classification
- Domain: Eukaryota
- Kingdom: Animalia
- Phylum: Chordata
- Class: Reptilia
- Order: Squamata
- Family: Diploglossidae
- Subfamily: Diploglossinae
- Genus: Diploglossus; Wiegmann, 1834

Type species
- Scincus monotropis Kuhl, 1820

Species
- 10 recognized species, see article

= Diploglossus =

Genus of lizards

Diploglossus is a genus of New World diploglossid lizards, with ten described species, commonly known as galliwasps.

Several former Diploglossus species were moved to the genus Siderolamprus in 2021.

== Geographic range ==
Species of the genus Diploglossus are found in South America and parts of the West Indies. One species, D. bilobatus, is found in Central America, but is sometimes placed in the distinct genus Mesoamericus in the subfamily Siderolamprinae.

== Species ==
The following ten species are recognized as being valid.

- Diploglossus delasagra (Cocteau, 1838) – Cuban pale-necked galliwasp, Cuban galliwasp
- Diploglossus fasciatus (Gray, 1831) – banded galliwasp
- Diploglossus garridoi Thomas & Hedges, 1998 – Cuban small-eared galliwasp
- Diploglossus lessonae Peracca, 1890 – Brazilian galliwasp
- Diploglossus microlepis (Gray, 1831) – small-lipped galliwasp
- Diploglossus millepunctatus O'Shaughnessy, 1874 – dotted galliwasp
- Diploglossus monotropis (Kuhl, 1820)
- Diploglossus montisserrati Underwood, 1964 – Montserrat galliwasp
- Diploglossus nigropunctatus Barbour & Shreve, 1937 – Cuban spotted galliwasp
- Diploglossus pleii A.M.C. Duméril & Bibron, 1839 – Puerto Rican galliwasp

Nota bene: A binomial authority in parentheses indicates that the species was originally described in a genus other than Diploglossus.
