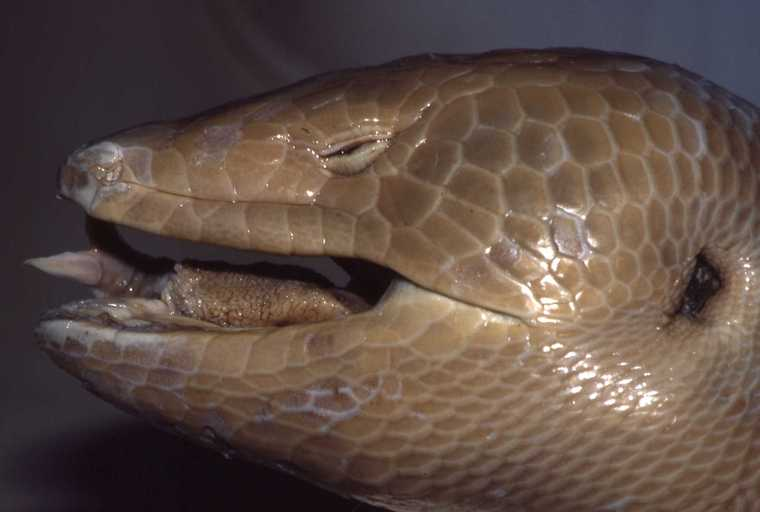
- Jamaican giant galliwasp (C. occiduus)

Scientific classification
- Kingdom: Animalia
- Phylum: Chordata
- Class: Reptilia
- Order: Squamata
- Suborder: Anguimorpha
- Family: Diploglossidae
- Subfamily: Celestinae
- Genus: Celestus; Gray, 1839

Species
- See text

= Celestus =

Genus of lizards

Celestus is a genus of diploglossid lizards mostly endemic to Jamaica (aside from a single species endemic to Haiti) and containing about 11 species, though three of these may be extinct. They are commonly known as galliwasps although the origin of this name is unclear. Formerly, this genus had more than 31 species, but a 2021 phylogenetic study found this classification to be paraphyletic and split those species into their own genera. A more recent study found that several ecomorphs exist on Jamaica including a swamp ecomorph, a tree ecomorph, and a ground ecomorph.

== Species ==
- Celestus barbouri Grant, 1940 – limestone forest galliwasp
- Celestus crusculus (Garman, 1887) – Jamaican forest galliwasp
- Celestus duquesneyi Grant, 1940 – blue-tailed forest galliwasp
- Celestus fowleri (Schwartz, 1971) – bromeliad forest galliwasp
- Celestus hewardi Gray, 1845 – red-spotted forest galliwasp
- Celestus macrolepis Gray, 1845 – large-scaled forest galliwasp (possibly extinct)
- Celestus macrotus Thomas & Hedges, 1989 – La Selle forest galliwasp
- Celestus microblepharis (Underwood, 1959) – small-eyed forest galliwasp
- Celestus molesworthi Grant, 1940 – Portland Coast forest galliwasp
- Celestus occiduus (Shaw, 1802) – Jamaican giant galliwasp (possibly extinct)
- Celestus striatus Gray, 1839 – golden forest galliwasp (possibly extinct)

Nota bene: a binomial authority in parentheses indicates that the species was originally described in a genus other than Celestus.
