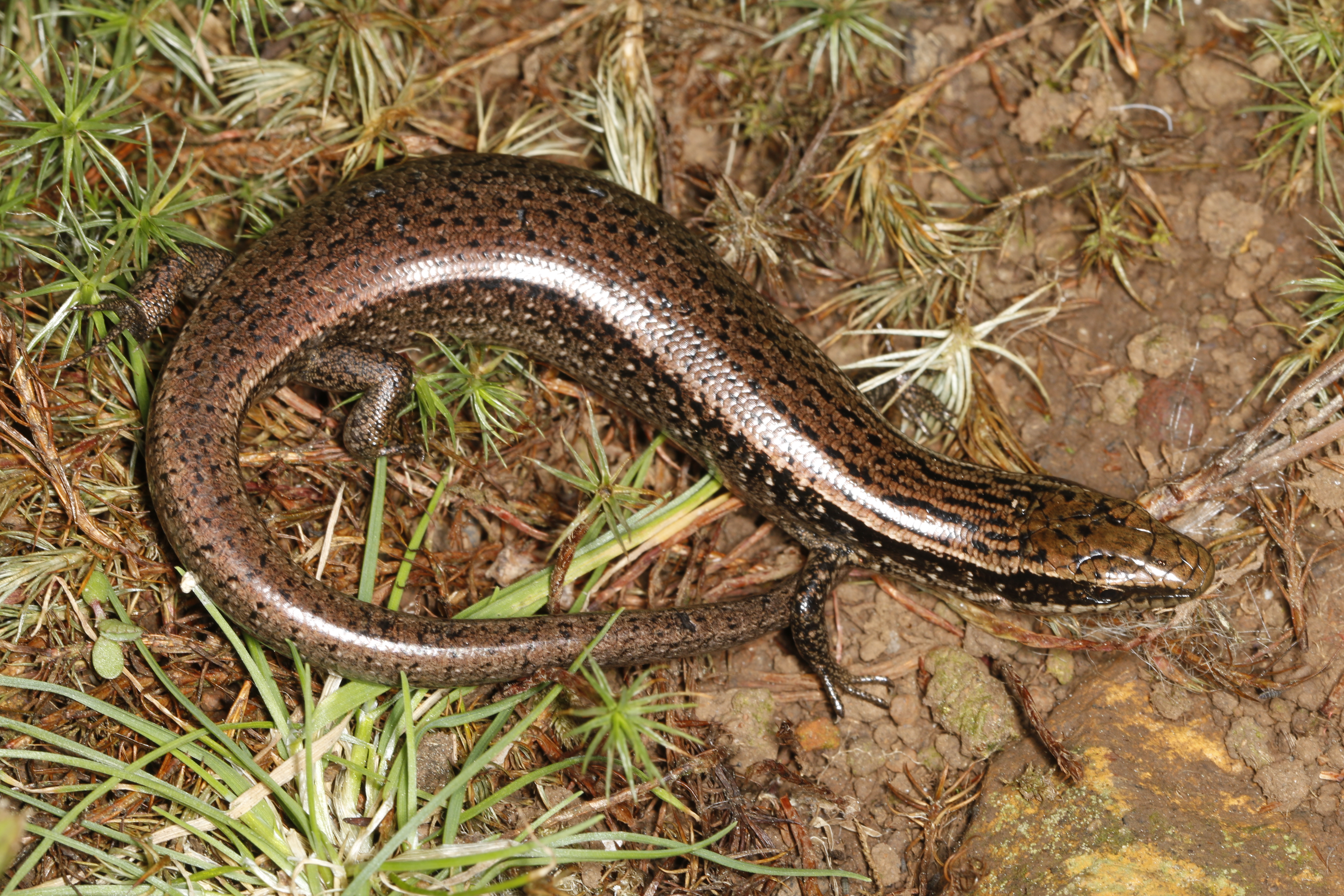
- Panolopus marcanoi

Scientific classification
- Kingdom: Animalia
- Phylum: Chordata
- Class: Reptilia
- Order: Squamata
- Suborder: Anguimorpha
- Clade: Anguioidea
- Family: Diploglossidae; Bocourt, 1873

Genera
- See text

= Diploglossidae =

Group of lizards

Diploglossidae is a family of anguimorph lizards native to the Americas, with most genera being endemic to Hispaniola. Most members of this family (aside from the legless genus Ophiodes) are known as galliwasps. They were formerly considered a subfamily of Anguidae, but genetic evidence has shown them to be less closely related to other members of Anguidae than Anniellidae is.

== Taxonomy ==
Phylogenetic evidence supports an early Cenozoic origin for the family Diploglossidae. member species were previously only classified into three genera (Celestus, Diploglossus, and Ophiodes), but a 2021 study found these genera to be paraphyletic, and thus further split them into more genera, classified within three different subfamilies (the celestines, diploglossines, and siderolamprines). The siderolamprines and a single celestine radiated throughout most of Central America, the diploglossines radiated throughout South America, and both the celestines and diploglossines radiated throughout the Caribbean.

== Classification ==
The family contains the following genera:

- Family Diploglossidae
  - Subfamily Celestinae
    - Genus Advenus – mountain forest galliwasp (one species)
    - Genus Caribicus – Hispaniolan giant galliwasps (three extant species)
    - Genus Celestus – Jamaican galliwasps (eight extant species, three possibly extinct species)
    - Genus Comptus (three species)
    - Genus Guarocuyus – Jaragua forest lizard (one species)
    - Genus Panolopus (three species)
    - Genus Sauresia – four-toed galliwasp (one species)
    - Genus Wetmorena – earless galliwasps (two species)
  - Subfamily Diploglossinae
    - Genus Diploglossus (10 species)
    - Genus Mesoamericus (one species) – O'Shaughnessy's galliwasp
    - Genus Ophiodes – worm lizards (six species)
  - Subfamily Siderolamprinae
    - Genus Siderolamprus (14 species)

== Description ==
Most galliwasps are larger lizards, with normally proportioned and complete limbs. They superficially resemble skinks, and due to their bright coloration and size, are falsely assumed to be venomous. They occupy terrestrial habitats.
