= List of endangered reptiles =

- Extinct in the wild (EW): 2 species
- Critically endangered (CR): 432 species
- Endangered (EN): 800 species
- Vulnerable (VU): 627 species
- Near threatened (NT, LR/cd): 566 species
- Least concern (LC): 6,406 species
- Data deficient (DD): 1,502 species
Reptile species (IUCN, 2025.2)
- 10,368 extant species have been evaluated
- 8,866 of those are fully assessed (Note: excludes data deficient evaluations.)
- 6,972 are not threatened at present
- 1,894 to 3,396 are threatened (Note: Threatened comprises CR, EN and VU. Upper estimate additionally includes DD.)
- 34 to 84 are extinct or extinct in the wild:
  - 32 extinct (EX) species (Note: Chart omits extinct (EX) species)
  - 2 extinct in the wild (EW)
  - 50 possibly extinct [CR(PE)]
  - 0 possibly extinct in the wild [CR(PEW)]

Endangered (EN) species are considered to be facing a very high risk of extinction the wild.

In September 2016, the International Union for Conservation of Nature (IUCN) listed 382 endangered reptile species. Of all evaluated reptile species, 7.4% are listed as endangered. The IUCN also lists nine reptile subspecies as endangered.

Of the subpopulations of reptiles evaluated by the IUCN, one species subpopulation has been assessed as endangered.

For a species to be considered endangered by the IUCN it must meet certain quantitative criteria which are designed to classify taxa facing "a very high risk of extinction". An even higher risk is faced by critically endangered species, which meet the quantitative criteria for endangered species. Critically endangered reptiles are listed separately. There are 578 reptile species which are endangered or critically endangered.

Additionally 910 reptile species (18% of those evaluated) are listed as data deficient, meaning there is insufficient information for a full assessment of conservation status. As these species typically have small distributions and/or populations, they are intrinsically likely to be threatened, according to the IUCN. While the category of data deficient indicates that no assessment of extinction risk has been made for the taxa, the IUCN notes that it may be appropriate to give them "the same degree of attention as threatened taxa, at least until their status can be assessed".

This is a complete list of endangered reptile species and subspecies evaluated by the IUCN. Species and subspecies which have endangered subpopulations (or stocks) are indicated.

== Turtles and tortoises ==
=== Kinosternidae ===
Mud turtles, musk turtles

- Narrow-bridged musk turtle (Claudius angustatus)
- Dunn's mud turtle (Kinosternon dunni)
- Giant musk turtle (Staurotypus salvinii)

=== Chelidae ===
Austro‑South American side‑necked turtles

- Chaco side-necked turtle (Acanthochelys pallidipectoris)
- Mary River turtle (Elusor macrurus)
- Namoi River snapping turtle (Myuchelys bellii)

=== Carettochelyidae ===
Pig-nosed turtle (single extant species)

- Pig-nosed turtle (Carettochelys insculpta)

=== Trionychidae ===
Softshell turtles

- Indian narrow-headed softshell turtle (Chitra indica)
- Zambezi flapshell turtle (Cycloderma frenatum)
- Indian softshell turtle (Nilssonia gangetica)
- Indian peacock softshell turtle (Nilssonia hurum)
- Euphrates softshell turtle (Rafetus euphraticus)

=== Emydidae ===
Terrapins

- Spotted turtle (Clemmys guttata)
- Blanding's turtle (Emydoidea blandingii)
- Wood turtle (Glyptemys insculpta)
- Cagle's map turtle (Graptemys caglei)
- Pascagoula map turtle (Graptemys gibbonsi)
- Pearl River map turtle (Graptemys pearlensis)
- Alabama red-bellied cooter (Pseudemys alabamensis)
- Coahuilan box turtle (Terrapene coahuila)
- Maranhão slider (Trachemys adiutrix)
- Cuatro Ciénegas slider (Trachemys taylori)

=== Geoemydidae ===
Box turtles, pond turtles

- Southeast Asian box turtle (Cuora amboinensis)
- Chinese box turtle (Cuora flavomarginata)
- Keeled box turtle (Cuora mouhotii)
- Western black-bridged leaf turtle (Cyclemys atripons)
- Oldham's leaf turtle (Cyclemys oldhamii)
- Eastern black-bridged leaf turtle (Cyclemys pulchristriata)
- Black pond turtle (Geoclemys hamiltonii)
- Ryukyu black-breasted leaf turtle (Geoemyda japonica)
- Black-breasted leaf turtle (Geoemyda spengleri)
- Brahminy river turtle (Hardella thurjii)
- Spiny turtle (Heosemys spinosa)
- Red-necked pond turtle (Mauremys nigricans)
- Chinese pond turtle (Mauremys reevesii)
- Tricarinate hill turtle (Melanochelys tricarinata)
- Burmese eyed turtle (Morenia ocellata)
- Indian eyed turtle (Morenia petersi)
- Maracaibo wood turtle (Rhinoclemmys diademata)
- Beale's eyed turtle (Sacalia bealei)
- Black marsh turtle (Siebenrockiella crassicollis)
- Cochin forest cane turtle (Vijayachelys silvatica)

=== Testudinidae ===
Tortoises

- Karoo dwarf tortoise (Chersobius boulengeri)
- Speckled Cape tortoise (Chersobius signatus)
- African spurred tortoise (Centrochelys sulcata)
- San Cristóbal giant tortoise (Chelonoidis chathamensis)
- Volcán Darwin giant tortoise (Chelonoidis microphyes)
- Cerro Azul giant tortoise (Chelonoidis vicina)
- Impressed tortoise (Manouria impressa)
- Western Hermann's tortoise (Testudo hermanni ssp. hermanni)

=== Chelydridae ===
Snapping turtles

- Alligator snapping turtle (Macrochelys temminckii)

== Crocodilia ==
- False gharial

== Lizards ==
There are 241 species and seven subspecies of lizard assessed as endangered.

=== Iguanids ===
Includes iguanas and related species.

Species

- Fijian banded iguana
- Fiji banded iguana
- Black-chested spiny-tailed iguana
- Roatán spiny-tailed iguana
- Motagua spiny-tailed iguana
- Rhinoceros iguana
- Blue iguana
- Central Bahamian rock iguana
- Angel Island chuckwalla

Subspecies

- Andros rock iguana
- Allen Cays iguana
- Acklins rock iguana

=== Flap-footed lizards ===
- Gnaraloo worm-lizard
- Striped legless lizard
- North West Cape delma

=== Anguidae ===
Includes slowworms, glass lizards, and alligator lizards.

- Cope's arboreal alligator lizard (Abronia aurita)
- Chiszar's arboreal alligator lizard (Abronia chiszari)
- Abronia deppii
- Abronia fimbriata
- Mount Zempoaltepec alligator lizard (Abronia fuscolabialis)
- Brilliant arboreal alligator lizard (Abronia gaiophantasma)
- Terrestrial arboreal alligator lizard (Abronia graminea)
- Abronia martindelcampoi
- Matuda's arboreal alligator lizard (Abronia matudai)
- Abronia meledona
- Monte Cristo arboreal alligator lizard (Abronia montecristoi)
- Salvador arboreal alligator lizard (Abronia salvadorensis)
- Barisia herrerae
- Barisia rudicollis
- Gerrhonotus parvus
- Mesaspis juarezi
- Ophisaurus ceroni

=== Diploglossidae ===
Galliwasps and Ophiodes sp. legless lizards

- Darlington's galliwasp (Caribicus darlingtoni)
- Barbour's galliwasp (Celestus barbouri)
- Red-spotted galliwasp (Celestus hewardi)
- Thomas's galliwasp (Celestus macrotus)
- Jamaican galliwasp (Celestus molesworthi)
- Cayman galliwasp (Comptus maculatus)
- Two-banded galliwasp (Siderolamprus bivittatus)
- Mountain lesser galliwasp (Siderolamprus montanus)
- Siderolamprus scansorius
- Serpentine four-toed galliwasp (Wetmorena agasepsoides)
- Earless galliwasp (Wetmorena haetiana)

=== Diplodactylidae ===
Diplodactylid geckos

- Forest bavayia (Bavayia cyclura)
- Bavayia goroensis
- Montane bavayia (Bavayia montana)
- Pretty bavayia (Bavayia pulchella)
- Sauvage's bavayia (Bavayia sauvagii)
- Bold-striped gecko (Dierogekko validiclavis)
- Western chameleon gecko (Eurydactylodes occidentalis)
- Harlequin gecko (Hoplodactylus rakiurae)
- Jewelled gecko (Naultinus gemmeus)
- Marlborough green gecko (Naultinus manukanus)
- Marbled gecko (Oedodera marmorata)
- High elevation bavayia (Paniegekko madjo)
- Stephen's Island gecko (Toropuku stephensi)

=== Chameleons ===
- Tiger chameleon (Archaius tigris)
- Transkei dwarf chameleon (Bradypodion caffer)
- Smith's dwarf chameleon (Bradypodion taeniabronchum)
- Brookesia bekolosy
- Decary's leaf chameleon (Brookesia decaryi)
- Toothed leaf chameleon (Brookesia dentata)
- Brookesia exarmata
- Naturelle leaf chameleon (Brookesia karchei)
- Lined leaf chameleon (Brookesia lineata)
- Brookesia minima
- Antsingy leaf chameleon (Brookesia perarmata)
- Brookesia peyrierasi
- Brookesia ramanantsoai
- Brookesia tristis
- Brookesia valerieae
- Calumma andringitraense
- Calumma furcifer
- Calumma gallus
- Calumma glawi
- Globe-horned chameleon (Calumma globifer)
- Calumma hilleniusi
- Tarzan chameleon (Calumma tarzan)
- Vences' chameleon (Calumma vencesi)
- Calumma vohibola
- Two-banded chameleon (Furcifer balteatus)
- Lesser chameleon (Furcifer minor)
- Furcifer nicosiai
- Magombera chameleon (Kinyongia magomberae)
- Giant East Usambara blade-horned chameleon (Kinyongia matschiei)
- West Usambara two-horned chameleon (Kinyongia multituberculata)
- Usambara flap-nosed chameleon (Kinyongia tenuis)
- Vosseler's blade-horned chameleon (Kinyongia vosseleri)
- Mlanje Mountain chameleon (Nadzikambia mlanjensis)
- Mount Mulanje pygmy chameleon (Rhampholeon platyceps)
- Rosette-nosed chameleon (Rhampholeon spinosus)
- East Usambara pygmy chameleon (Rhampholeon temporalis)
- Mount Namuli pygmy chameleon (Rhampholeon tilburyi)
- Pare pygmy chameleon (Rhampholeon viridis)
- Spiny-flanked chameleon (Trioceros laterispinis)
- Perret's montane chameleon (Trioceros perreti)
- Bakossi two-horned chameleon (Trioceros pfefferi)

=== Anoles ===
- Ahl's anole (Anolis ahli)
- Anolis amplisquamosus
- Armour's anole (Anolis armouri)
- Anolis cusuco
- Cabo Cruz banded anole (Anolis guafe)
- Anolis hobartsmithi
- Brown red-bellied anole (Anolis koopmani)
- Honduran giant anole (Anolis loveridgei)
- Jacmel gracile anole (Anolis marron)
- Proboscis anole (Anolis proboscis)
- Anolis pygmaeus
- Anolis ruizii
- Mouse anole (Anolis sminthus)
- Baoruco cliff anole (Anolis strahmi)

=== Gekkonids ===
- Goan day gecko (Cnemaspis goaensis)
- Western gecko (Cnemaspis occidentalis)
- Psychedelic rock gecko (Cnemaspis psychedelica)
- Wyanad day gecko (Cnemaspis wynadensis)
- Cyrtodactylus adleri
- Cyrtodactylus brevidactylus
- Jeypore ground gecko (Jeypore ground gecko)
- Johore bow-fingered gecko (Cyrtodactylus sworderi)
- Cyrtodactylus wakeorum
- Ebenavia maintimainty
- Banda Island dtella (Gehyra barea)
- Gekko badenii
- Hemidactylus makolowodei
- Scaly gecko (Hemidactylus scabriceps)
- Jolo flapped-legged gecko (Luperosaurus joloensis)
- Mcgregor's flapped-legged gecko (Luperosaurus macgregori)
- Lygodactylus intermedius
- Lygodactylus ornatus
- Lygodactylus roavolana
- Mediodactylus amictopholis
- Paragehyra gabriellae
- Paroedura masobe
- Comoro ground gecko (Paroedura sanctijohannis)
- Paroedura tanjaka
- Antanosy day gecko (Phelsuma antanosy)
- Micronesia saw-tailed gecko (Perochirus ateles)
- Yellow-throated day gecko (Phelsuma flavigularis)
- Round Island day gecko (Phelsuma guentheri)
- Yellow-headed day gecko (Phelsuma klemmeri)
- Pronk's day gecko (Phelsuma pronki)
- Robert Mertens' day gecko (Phelsuma robertmertensi)
- Rösler's day gecko (Phelsuma roesleri)
- Seipp's day gecko (Phelsuma seippi)
- Flat-tailed day gecko (Phelsuma serraticauda)
- Phelsuma vanheygeni
- Weiler's gecko (Urocotyledon weileri)
- Uroplatus guentheri
- Uroplatus malahelo
- Uroplatus pietschmanni

=== Wall lizards ===
- Acanthodactylus ahmaddisii
- Blanc's fringe-toed lizard (Acanthodactylus blanci)
- Schreiber's fringe-fingered lizard (Acanthodactylus schreiberi)
- Doumergue's fringe-fingered lizard (Acanthodactylus spinicauda)
- Spanish algyroides (Algyroides marchi)
- Bendimahi lizard (Darevskia bendimahiensis)
- Clarks' lizard (Darevskia clarkorum)
- Rostombekov's lizard (Darevskia rostombekowi)
- Uzzell's lizard (Darevskia uzzelli)
- La Gomera giant lizard (Gallotia bravoana)
- Tenerife speckled lizard (Gallotia intermedia)
- Aran rock lizard (Iberolacerta aranica)
- Aurelio's rock lizard (Iberolacerta aurelioi)
- Iberolacerta cyreni
- Peña de Francia rock lizard (Iberolacerta martinezricai)
- Fraas' lizard (Parvilacerta fraasii)
- Philochortus zolii
- Phoenicolacerta kulzeri
- Podarcis carbonelli
- Podarcis cretensis
- Lilford's wall lizard (Podarcis lilfordi)
- Aeolian wall lizard (Podarcis raffonei)
- Green Psammodromus (Psammodromus microdactylus)
- Miyako grass lizard (Takydromus toyamai)

=== Skinks ===
Species

- Rock skink (Amphiglossus decaryi)
- Limbless worm skink (Brachymeles vermis)
- Koumac litter skink (Caledoniscincus auratus)
- Chazeau's litter skink (Caledoniscincus chazeaui)
- Panié litter skink (Caledoniscincus orestes)
- Renevier's litter skink (Caledoniscincus renevieri)
- Southern pale-hipped skink (Celatiscincus euryotis)
- Northern pale-hipped skink (Celatiscincus similis)
- Two-fingered skink (Chalcides mauritanicus)
- Doumergue's skink (Chalcides parallelus)
- Chalcides simonyi
- Vaillant's mabuya (Chioninia vaillantii)
- Boulenger's dasia (Dasia subcaerulea)
- Micronesian skink (Emoia adspersa)
- Anatom emo skink (Emoia aneityumensis)
- Micronesia forest skink (Emoia boettgeri)
- Vitilevu mountain treeskink (Emoia campbelli)
- Olive small-scaled skink (Emoia lawesi)
- Vanualevu slender treeskink (Emoia mokosariniveikau)
- Ponape skink (Emoia ponapea)
- Samoa skink (Emoia samoensis)
- Viti barred treeskink (Emoia trossula)
- Blue Mountain water skink (Eulamprus leuraensis)
- Poona skink (Eurylepis poonaensis)
- Inger's mabuya (Eutropis clivicola)
- Brauer's burrowing skink (Janetaescincus braueri)
- Vesey-Fitzgerald's burrowing skink (Janetaescincus veseyfitzgeraldi)
- Kanakysaurus viviparus
- Kanakysaurus zebratus
- Deignan tree skink (Lankascincus deignani)
- Rwanda five-toed skink (Leptosiaphos graueri)
- Five-toed skink (Leptosiaphos pauliani)
- Mount Cooper striped lerista (Lerista vittata)
- Maruia maquis skink (Lioscincus maruia)
- White-lipped forest skink (Lioscincus steindachneri)
- Rusty skink (Madascincus macrolepis)
- Marmorosphax taom
- Uluguru limbless skink (Melanoseps emmrichi)
- Nannoscincus garrulus
- Greer's dwarf skink (Nannoscincus greeri)
- Forêt plate dwarf skink (Nannoscincus humectus)
- Slevin's dwarf skink (Nannoscincus slevini)
- Chevron skink (Oligosoma homalonotum)
- Otago skink (Oligosoma otagense)
- Terror skink (Phoboscincus bocourti)
- Pseudoacontias angelorum
- Pygomeles petteri
- Legless burrowing skink (Scelotes inornatus)
- Sirenoscincus yamagishi
- Sulu sphenomorphus (Sphenomorphus biparietalis)
- Puerto Rican skink (Spondylurus nitidus)
- Adelaide pygmy blue-tongue skink (Tiliqua adelaidensis)
- Typhlacontias kataviensis
- Voeltzkowia mira

Subspecies

- Egernia stokesii badia
- Eulamprus tympanum marnieae

=== Spectacled lizards ===
- Pamplona anadia (Anadia pamplonensis)
- Anadia pariaensis
- Calyptommatus confusionibus
- Vanzolini's teiid (Colobodactylus dalcyanus)
- Echinosaura brachycephala
- Martinique spectacled tegu (Gymnophthalmus pleii)
- Parker's pholidobolus (Macropholidus annectens)
- Proctoporus cephalolineatus
- Riama balneator
- Colombian lightbulb lizard (Riama columbiana)
- Tropical lightbulb lizard (Riama oculata)
- Riama petrorum

=== Sphaerodactylids ===
- Natal pigmy gecko (Coleodactylus natalensis)
- Estados Sucre gecko (Gonatodes seigliei)
- Colombian dwarf gecko (Lepidoblepharis miyatai)
- Lepidoblepharis williamsi
- Guantanamo coastal gecko (Sphaerodactylus armasi)
- Monito gecko (Sphaerodactylus micropithecus)
- Pepper sphaero (Sphaerodactylus pimienta)
- Boulenger's least gecko (Sphaerodactylus scapularis)
- Sphaerodactylus storeyae
- Thompson's least gecko (Sphaerodactylus thompsoni)

=== Phrynosomatids ===
- Sceloporus chaneyi
- Sceloporus cyanostictus
- Sceloporus goldmani
- Uma exsul
- Coachella Valley fringe-toed lizard (Uma inornata)
- Urosaurus auriculatus

=== Liolaemids ===
- Arambaré tree iguana (Liolaemus arambarensis)
- Gravenhorst's tree iguana (Liolaemus gravenhorstii)
- Liolaemus leopardinus
- Liolaemus lorenzmuelleri
- Dragon of Torres (Liolaemus manueli)
- Liolaemus multimaculatus
- Shoulder tree iguana (Liolaemus scapularis)

=== Other lizard species ===
- Ameiva provitaae
- Amphisbaena hyporissor
- Amphisbaena lumbricalis
- Anniella geronimensis
- Spineless forest lizard (Calotes liocephalus)
- Rough-nosed horned lizard (Ceratophora aspera)
- Leaf-nosed lizard (Ceratophora tennentii)
- Dwarf Karoo girdled lizard (Cordylus aridus)
- Mecula girdled lizard (Cordylus meculae)
- Venerable collared lizard (Crotaphytus antiquus)
- Cassine river worm lizard (Cynisca oligopholis)
- Cameroon worm lizard (Cynisca schaeferi)
- Amathites lava lizard (Eurolophosaurus amathites)
- Blunt-nosed leopard lizard (Gambelia sila)
- Cat ba tiger gecko (Goniurosaurus catbaensis)
- Kuroiwa's ground gecko (Goniurosaurus kuroiwae)
- Modigliani's nose-horned lizard (Harpesaurus modiglianii)
- Lipetz's tropical night lizard (Lepidophyma lipetzi)
- Dunn's spinytail lizard (Morunasaurus groi)
- Indian kangaroo lizard (Otocryptis beddomii)
- Censky's ameiva (Pholidoscelis corax)
- Saint Croix ground lizard (Pholidoscelis polops)
- Narrow leaf-toed gecko (Phyllodactylus angustidigitus)
- Gulbaru leaf-tailed gecko (Phyllurus gulbaru)
- Pristidactylus alvaroi
- Pristidactylus valeriae
- Chinese crocodile lizard (Shinisaurus crocodilurus)
- Modest whorltail iguana (Stenocercus modestus)
- Giant wall gecko (Tarentola gigas)
- Udzungwa long-tailed seps (Tetradactylus udzungwensis)
- Tropidurus psammonastes
- Panay monitor (Varanus mabitang)
- Varanus macraei
- Komodo dragon (Varanus komodoensis)
- Xenosaurus newmanorum
- Xenosaurus platyceps
- Zonosaurus subunicolor

== Snakes ==
There are 97 species and one subspecies of snake assessed as endangered.

=== Typhlopid blind snakes ===
- Gierra's blind snake (Afrotyphlops gierrai)
- Grenada bank blindsnake (Amerotyphlops tasymicris)
- Uluguru gracile blind-snake (Letheobia uluguruensis)
- Ramphotyphlops suluensis
- Haitian pale-lipped blindsnake (Typhlops capitulatus)
- Tiburon Peninsula blindsnake (Typhlops hectus)
- Mona blind snake (Typhlops monensis)
- Schmutz's worm snake (Typhlops schmutzi)

=== Vipers ===
Species

- Atropoides indomitus
- March's palm pit viper (Bothriechis marchi)
- Lojan lancehead (Bothrops lojanus)
- Tancitaran dusky rattlesnake (Crotalus pusillus)
- Cyclades blunt-nosed viper (Macrovipera schweizeri)
- Barbour's montane pit viper (Mixcoatlus barbouri)
- Mixcoatlus melanurus
- Mountain viper (Montivipera albizona)
- Lebanon viper (Montivipera bornmuelleri)
- Latifi's viper (Montivipera latifii)
- Pulau Tioman pit viper (Popeia buniana)
- Mangshan pit viper (Protobothrops mangshanensis)
- Three horned-scaled pitviper (Protobothrops sieversorum)
- Trungkhanh pit viper (Protobothrops trungkhanhensis)
- Kanburi pit viper (Trimeresurus kanburiensis)
- McGregor’s pit viper (Trimeresurus mcgregori)
- Caucasian (Caucasus) viper (Vipera kaznakovi)
- Magnificent viper (Vipera magnifica)
- Black sea viper (Vipera pontica)
- Truong Son pit viper (Viridovipera truongsonensis)

Subspecies

- Hungarian meadow viper (Vipera ursinii rakosensis)

=== Dipsadids ===
- Dary's burrowing snake
- Adelphicos ibarrorum
- Leeward island racer
- Red-bellied racer
- Terre-de-Haut racer
- Carrion's ground snake
- Western ground snake
- Tropical forest snake
- Calamodontophis ronaldoi
- Chapinophis xanthocheilus
- Redbelly earth runner (Chersodromus rubriventris)
- Enulius roatenensis
- Williams' ground snake (Erythrolamprus williamsi)
- Mertens' earth snake (Geophis fulvoguttatus)
- Geophis talamancae
- Marcella's graceful brown snake (Rhadinaea marcellae)
- Nuevo Leon graceful brown snake (Rhadinaea montana)
- Stadelman's graceful brown snake (Rhadinaea stadelmani)
- Hempstead's pine woods snake (Rhadinella hempsteadae)
- Posada's graceful brown snake (Rhadinella posadasi)
- Sibon lamari
- Sichuan hot-spring keelback (Thermophis zhaoermii)
- Dunn's tropical ground snake (Trimetopon simile)

=== Elapids ===
- Dusky sea snake (Aipysurus fuscus)
- Somali garter snake (Elapsoidea chelazzii)
- Catamayo coral snake (Micrurus catamayensis)
- Fiji snake (Ogmodon vitianus)

=== Colubrids ===
- Perrotet's vine snake (Ahaetulla perroteti)
- Bourret's cat snake (Boiga bourreti)
- Banded green cat snake (Boiga saengsomi)
- Sichuan rat snake (Euprepiophis perlacea)
- Hardy's hook-nosed snake (Ficimia hardyi)
- Cyprus whip snake (Hierophis cypriensis)
- Sulu short-headed snake (Oligodon meyerinkii)
- Roatan vine snake (Oxybelis wilsoni)
- Louisiana pinesnake (Pituophis ruthveni)
- Yellow-lined centipede snake (Tantilla flavilineata)
- Mena's centipede snake (Tantilla lempira)
- Rim rock crown snake (Tantilla oolitica)
- Potosí centipede snake (Tantilla shawi)
- Hoogstraal's cat snake (Telescopus hoogstraali)
- Schmidt's bold-eyed tree snake (Thrasops schmidti)

=== Keelbacks ===
- Wa Shan keelback (Hebius metusium)
- Dermal's cylindrical snake (Hologerrhum dermali)
- Seychelles wolf snake (Lycognathophis seychellensis)
- Gary's mountain keelback (Opisthotropis alcalai)
- Blackbelly garter snake (Thamnophis melanogaster)
- Tamaulipan montane garter snake (Thamnophis mendax)

=== Other snake species ===
- Ramsay's python (Aspidites ramsayi)
- Yunnan reed snake (Calamaria yunnanensis)
- Cerberus microlepis
- Virgin Islands boa (Chilabothrus granti)
- Mona Island boa (Chilabothrus monensis)
- Cropan's boa (Corallus cropanii)
- Enhydris vorisi
- Seychelles house snake (Lamprophis geometricus)
- Mitophis asbolepis
- Travancore Hills thorntail snake (Platyplectrurus madurensis)
- Mountain burrowing snake (Pseudorabdion montanum)
- Travancore earth snake (Rhinophis travancoricus)

== See also ==
- Lists of IUCN Red List endangered species
- List of least concern reptiles
- List of near threatened reptiles
- List of vulnerable reptiles
- List of critically endangered reptiles
- List of recently extinct reptiles
- List of data deficient reptiles
