= Yarrow's spiny lizard =

There are two species of lizard named Yarrow's spiny lizard:

- Sceloporus jarrovii, native to the southwestern United States and northern Mexico
- Sceloporus cyanostictus, endemic to Mexico
