= Nannoscincus gracilis =

Conservation status
- Vulnerable (IUCN 3.1)

Scientific classification
- Kingdom: Animalia
- Phylum: Chordata
- Class: Reptilia
- Order: Squamata
- Family: Scincidae
- Genus: Nannoscincus
- Species: N. gracilis

Binomial name
- Nannoscincus gracilis (Bavay, 1869)

Species of lizard

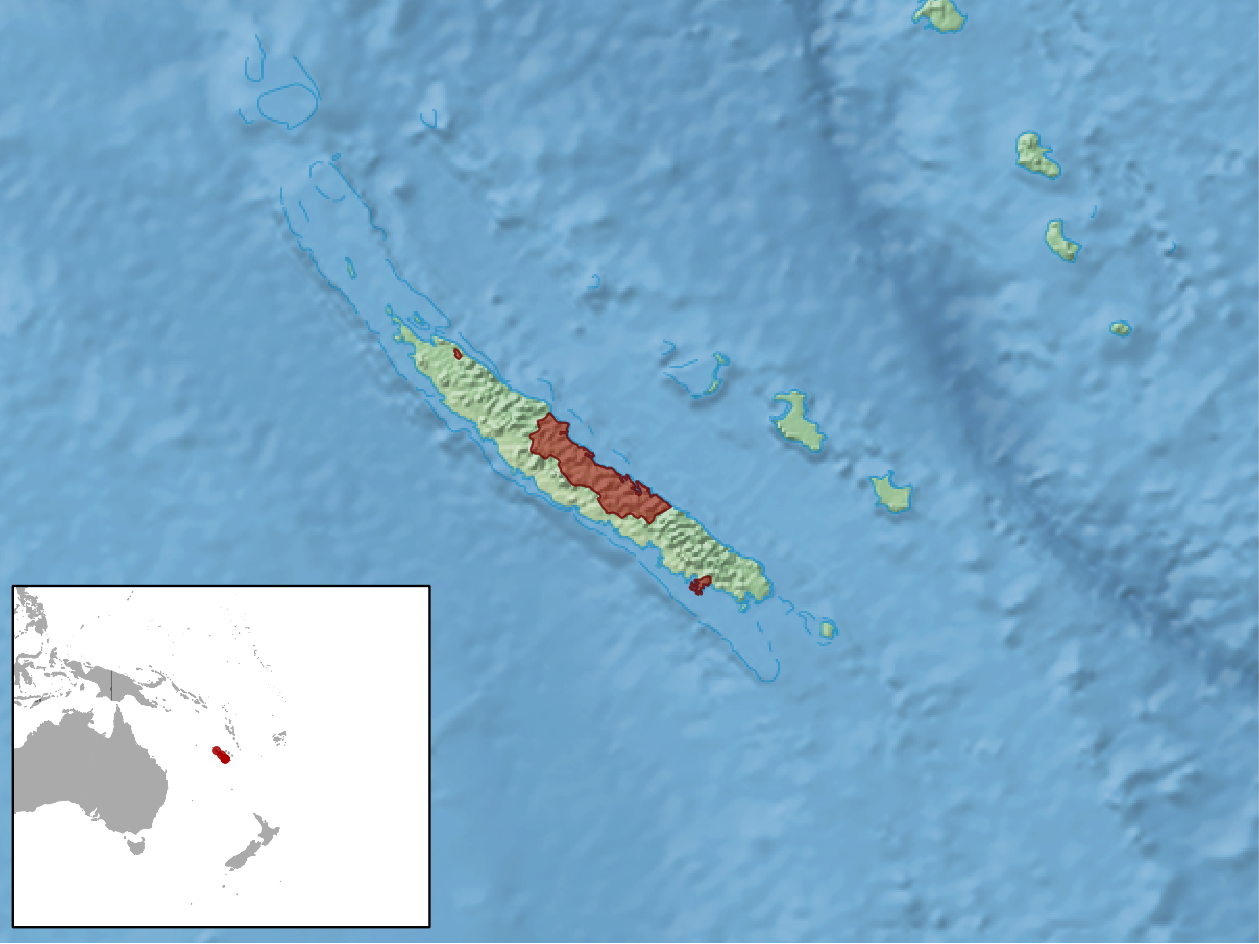

Nannoscincus gracilis, the New Caledonian gracile dwarf skink, gracile dwarf skink, or slender elf skink, is a species of skink found in New Caledonia.
