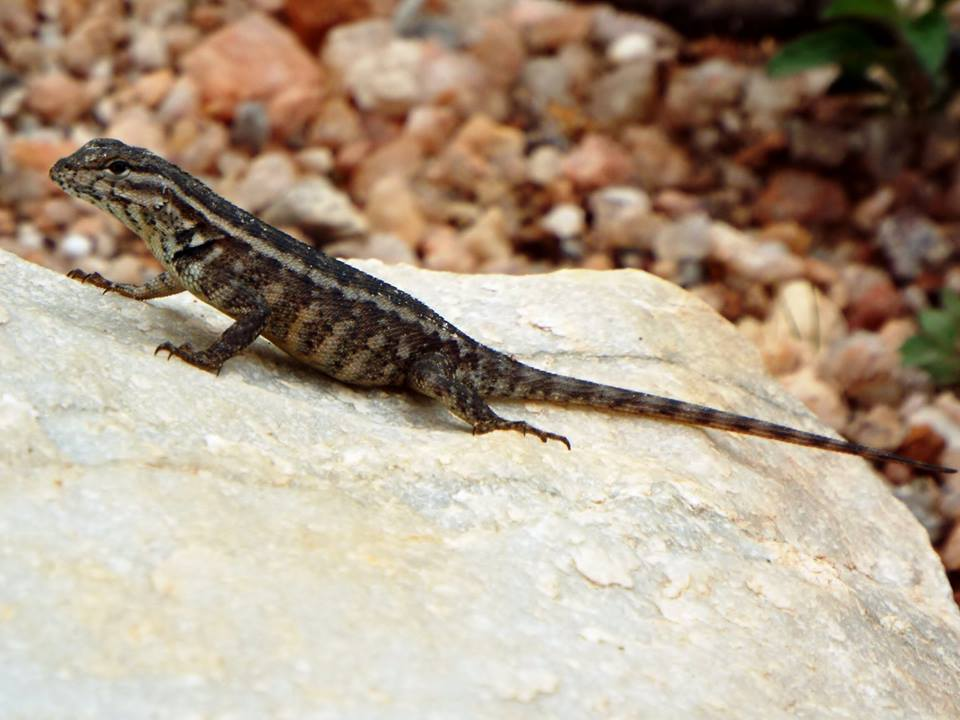
- Rodrigues's lava lizard

Scientific classification
- Kingdom: Animalia
- Phylum: Chordata
- Class: Reptilia
- Order: Squamata
- Suborder: Iguania
- Family: Tropiduridae
- Genus: Eurolophosaurus; Frost, Etheridge, Janies & Titus, 2001

= Eurolophosaurus =

Genus of reptiles

Eurolophosaurus is a genus of reptiles belonging to the family Tropiduridae.

The species of this genus are diurnal and found in open sandy or rocky habitats in east-central Brazil.

== Species ==
Species:

- Eurolophosaurus amathites (Rodrigues, 1984) – Amathites lava lizard
- Eurolophosaurus divaricatus (Rodrigues, 1986)
- Eurolophosaurus nanuzae (Rodrigues, 1981) – Rodrigues's lava lizard
