= Seychelles sucker-tailed gecko =

Conservation status
- Least Concern (IUCN 3.1)

Scientific classification
- Kingdom: Animalia
- Phylum: Chordata
- Class: Reptilia
- Order: Squamata
- Suborder: Gekkota
- Family: Gekkonidae
- Genus: Urocotyledon
- Species: U. inexpectata

Binomial name
- Urocotyledon inexpectata (Steiner, 1893)
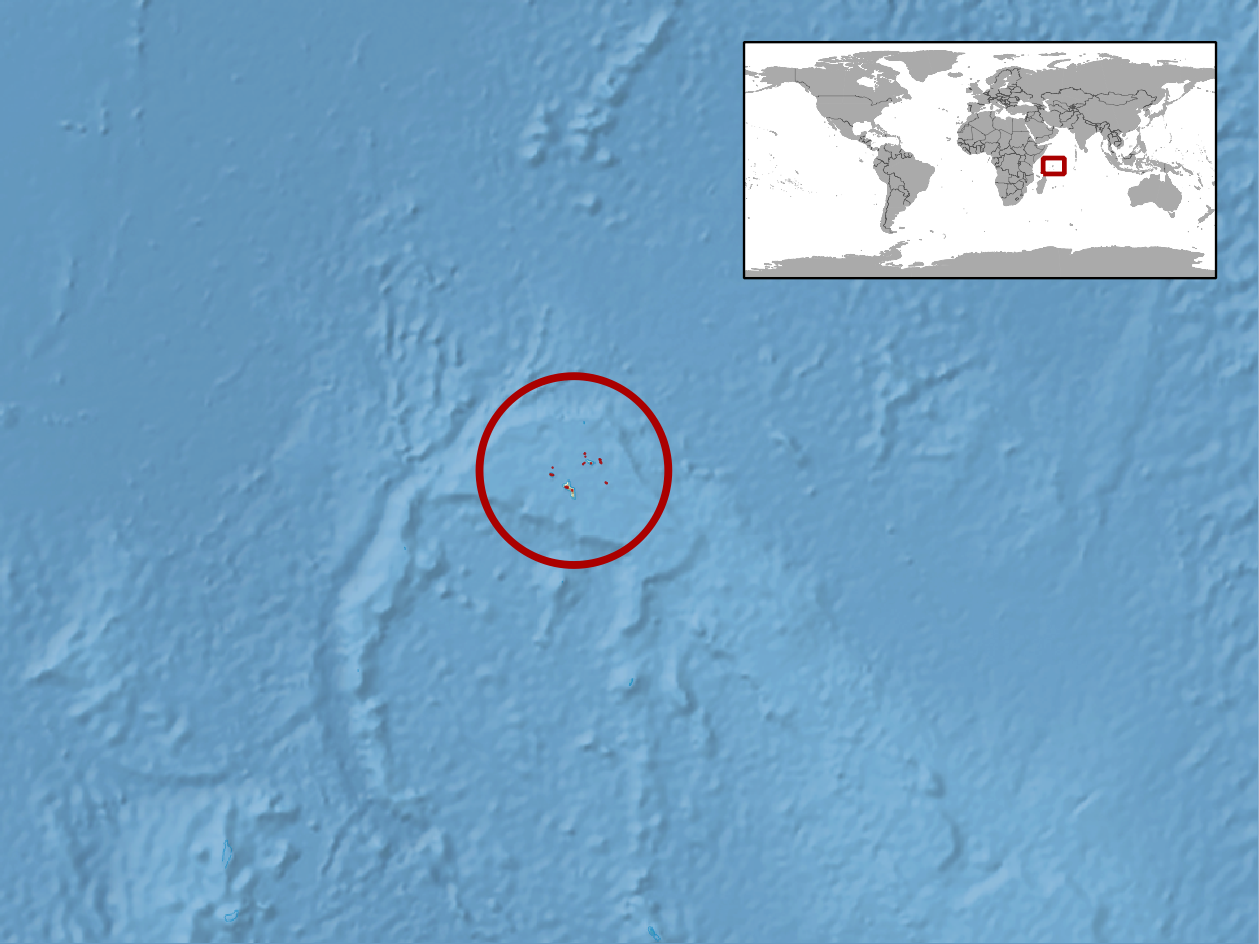

Species of lizard

The Seychelles sucker-tailed gecko or Seychelles surprise gecko (Urocotyledon inexpectata) is a species of lizard in the family Gekkonidae. It is endemic to Seychelles.

Its natural habitats are subtropical or tropical dry forests, subtropical or tropical moist lowland forests, plantations, rural gardens, and urban areas. It is threatened by habitat loss.
