= Nannoscincus =

Scientific classification
- Kingdom: Animalia
- Phylum: Chordata
- Class: Reptilia
- Order: Squamata
- Family: Scincidae
- Subfamily: Eugongylinae
- Genus: Nannoscincus; Günther, 1872

Genus of lizards

Nannoscincus is a genus of small skinks, lizards in the family Scincidae. The genus is endemic to New Caledonia.

== Species ==
The following 12 species are recognized as being valid.

- Nannoscincus exos Bauer & Sadlier, 2000 – northern dwarf skink
- Nannoscincus fuscus Günther, 1872
- Nannoscincus garrulus Sadlier, Bauer & S.A. Smith, 2006
- Nannoscincus gracilis (Bavay, 1869) – New Caledonian gracile dwarf skink, gracile dwarf skink, slender elf skink
- Nannoscincus greeri Sadlier, 1987 – Greer's elf skink
- Nannoscincus hanchisteus Bauer & Sadlier, 2000 – Pindai dwarf skink
- Nannoscincus humectus Bauer & Sadlier, 2000 – Forêt Plate dwarf skink
- Nannoscincus koniambo Sadlier, Bauer, A. Whitaker & Wood, 2014
- Nannoscincus manautei Sadlier, Bauer, A. Whitaker & S.A. Smith, 2004
- Nannoscincus mariei (Bavay, 1869) – earless dwarf skink
- Nannoscincus rankini Sadlier, 1987 – Rankin's elf skink
- Nannoscincus slevini (Loveridge, 1941) – Slevin's elf skink

Nota bene: A binomial authority in parentheses indicates that the species was originally described in a genus other than Nannoscincus.
