= Thermophis =

Scientific classification
- Kingdom: Animalia
- Phylum: Chordata
- Class: Reptilia
- Order: Squamata
- Suborder: Serpentes
- Family: Colubridae
- Subfamily: Dipsadinae
- Genus: Thermophis; Malnate, 1953

Synonyms
- Natrix

Genus of snakes

Thermophis is a genus of snakes in the family Colubridae. The genus is endemic to China.

== Species ==
The genus includes three species:

- Thermophis baileyi (Wall, 1907) - Bailey's snake, hot-spring keelback, Xizang hot-spring keelback
- Thermophis shangrila Peng, Lu, Huang, Guo and Zhang, 2014 - Yunnan hot-spring keelback, Shangrila hot-spring keelback
- Thermophis zhaoermii Guo, Liu, Feng & He, 2008 - Sichuan hot-spring keelback
