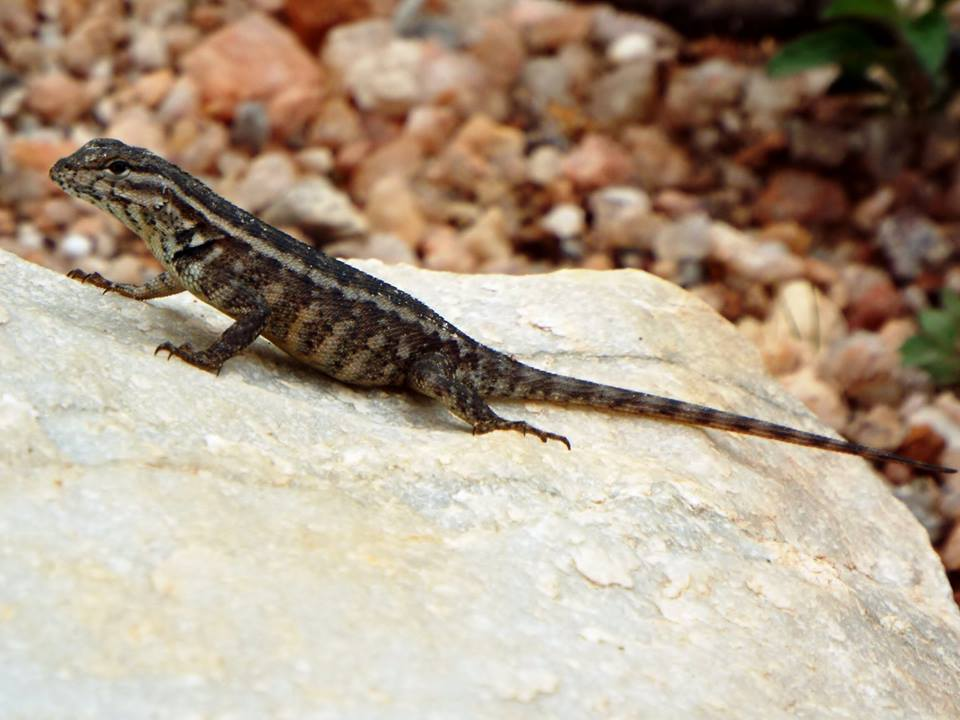

Conservation status
- Least Concern (IUCN 3.1)

Scientific classification
- Kingdom: Animalia
- Phylum: Chordata
- Class: Reptilia
- Order: Squamata
- Suborder: Iguania
- Family: Tropiduridae
- Genus: Eurolophosaurus
- Species: E. nanuzae

Binomial name
- Eurolophosaurus nanuzae (Rodrigues, 1981)

Synonyms
- Tropidurus nanuzae Rodrigues, 1981

= Eurolophosaurus nanuzae =

Species of lizard

Eurolophosaurus nanuzae, also known commonly as Rodrigues's lava lizard and lagartinho-de-crista-do-espinhaço in Brazilian Portuguese, is a species of South American lava lizard in the family Tropiduridae. The species is endemic to Brazil.

== Etymology ==
The specific name, nanuzae, is in honor of Brazilian botanist Nanuza Luiza de Menezes.

== Geographic range ==
Eurolophosaurus nanuzae is found in eastern Brazil, in the Brazilian states of Bahia and Minas Gerais.

== Habitat ==
The preferred natural habitat of Eurolophosaurus nanuzae is rocky shrubland, at elevations above 900 m (3,000 ft).

== Behavior ==
Eurolophosaurus nanuzae is terrestrial, saxicolous (rock-dwelling), and diurnal.

== Diet ==
Eurolophosaurus nanuzae preys predominately upon termites and ants.

== Reproduction ==
Eurolophosaurus nanuzae is oviparous.
