= Nannoscincus koniambo =

Scientific classification
- Kingdom: Animalia
- Phylum: Chordata
- Class: Reptilia
- Order: Squamata
- Family: Scincidae
- Genus: Nannoscincus
- Species: N. koniambo

Binomial name
- Nannoscincus koniambo Sadlier, Bauer, Whitaker, & Wood, 2014

Species of lizard

Nannoscincus koniambo is a species of skink found in New Caledonia.
