= Celatiscincus =

Scientific classification
- Kingdom: Animalia
- Phylum: Chordata
- Class: Reptilia
- Order: Squamata
- Family: Scincidae
- Subfamily: Eugongylinae
- Genus: Celatiscincus; Sadlier, Smith, & Bauer, 2006

Species
- 2 sp., see text

Genus of lizards

Celatiscincus is a genus of skinks. Both species are endemic to New Caledonia.

== Species ==
The following 2 species, listed alphabetically by specific name, are recognized as being valid:

- Celatiscincus euryotis (Werner, 1909) – southern pale-hipped skink
- Celatiscincus similis Sadlier, Smith, & Bauer, 2006 – northern pale-hipped skink

Nota bene: A binomial authority in parentheses indicates that the species was originally described in a genus other than Celatiscincus.
