= Nannoscincus exos =

Conservation status
- Critically Endangered (IUCN 3.1)

Scientific classification
- Kingdom: Animalia
- Phylum: Chordata
- Class: Reptilia
- Order: Squamata
- Family: Scincidae
- Genus: Nannoscincus
- Species: N. exos

Binomial name
- Nannoscincus exos Bauer & Sadlier, 2000

Species of lizard

Nannoscincus exos, the northern dwarf skink, is a species of skink found in New Caledonia.
