= Thermophis baileyi =

Conservation status
- Endangered (IUCN 3.1)

Scientific classification
- Kingdom: Animalia
- Phylum: Chordata
- Class: Reptilia
- Order: Squamata
- Suborder: Serpentes
- Family: Colubridae
- Genus: Thermophis
- Species: T. baileyi

Binomial name
- Thermophis baileyi (Wall, 1907)

Synonyms
- Tropidonotus baileyi Wall, 1907; Natrix baileyi — Malnate, 1953; Thermophis baileyi — Malnate, 1953

Species of snake

Thermophis baileyi, also known commonly as Bailey's snake, the hot-spring keelback, the hot-spring snake, and the Xizang hot-spring keelback, is a rare species of colubrid snake endemic to Tibet.

== Etymology ==
The specific name, baileyi, is in honor of Frederick M. Bailey, a British army officer and explorer.

== Geographic range ==
T. baileyi is found only at high altitudes on the Tibetan Plateau. The species is endemic to Tibet and was recorded for the first time in 1907 by Wall near Gyantze at 4,300 m (14,110 ft) above sea level (no exact coordinates available). In 1990, J. Robert Macey and Theodore Johnstone Papenfuss reported the species from Yangbajain hot spring area. So far T. baileyi is known only from a few sites. A comprehensive distribution map of T. baileyi was provided by Sylvia Hofmann et al. (2014), showing that the geographic range of the snake is a restricted area between the Transhimalaya and the Himalaya, along the central part of the Yarlung Zhangbo suture zone.

== Description ==
Thermophis baileyi is olive green, with five series of indistinct spots dorsally, most pronounced in the forebody. It has a dusky postocular streak, and dusky posterior edges to the labials. The belly is bluish-grey, with each ventral black basally. The young are darker than adults.

The dorsal scales are in 19 rows at midbody, all keeled except the last row, with indistinct double apical facets. The ventrals number 201–221. The anal is divided. The subcaudals number 91-111, mostly divided, but with a few entire.

Adults may attain a total length (including tail) of 2 feet 6 inches (76 cm).

== Conservation status ==
Bailey's snake is considered an Endangered species by IUCN. In the last decades, the growing exploitation of geothermal energy has led to a destruction of hot spring habitats, resulting in an increased threat to populations of hot-spring snakes.

== Taxonomy ==
The existence of Bailey's snake was first announced in the scientific literature in 1907, when it was described as a new species by Frank Wall. Wall originally classified it as Tropodinotus baileyi. In 1953 Malnate referred to it as Tropidonotus (= Natrix) baileyi, and realizing that Bailey's snake did not fit in the genus Natrix, placed it in the new genus Thermophis, designating T. baileyi as the type species.

== Habitat ==
Snakes of the genus Thermophis live probably at the highest altitude of any snakes in the world. The presence of T. baileyi is strongly attributable to hot springs with low sulphur concentration, locations in river valleys that provide rocky slopes and vegetated shorelines, and existence of a river within a 500 m (1,600 ft) radius.
