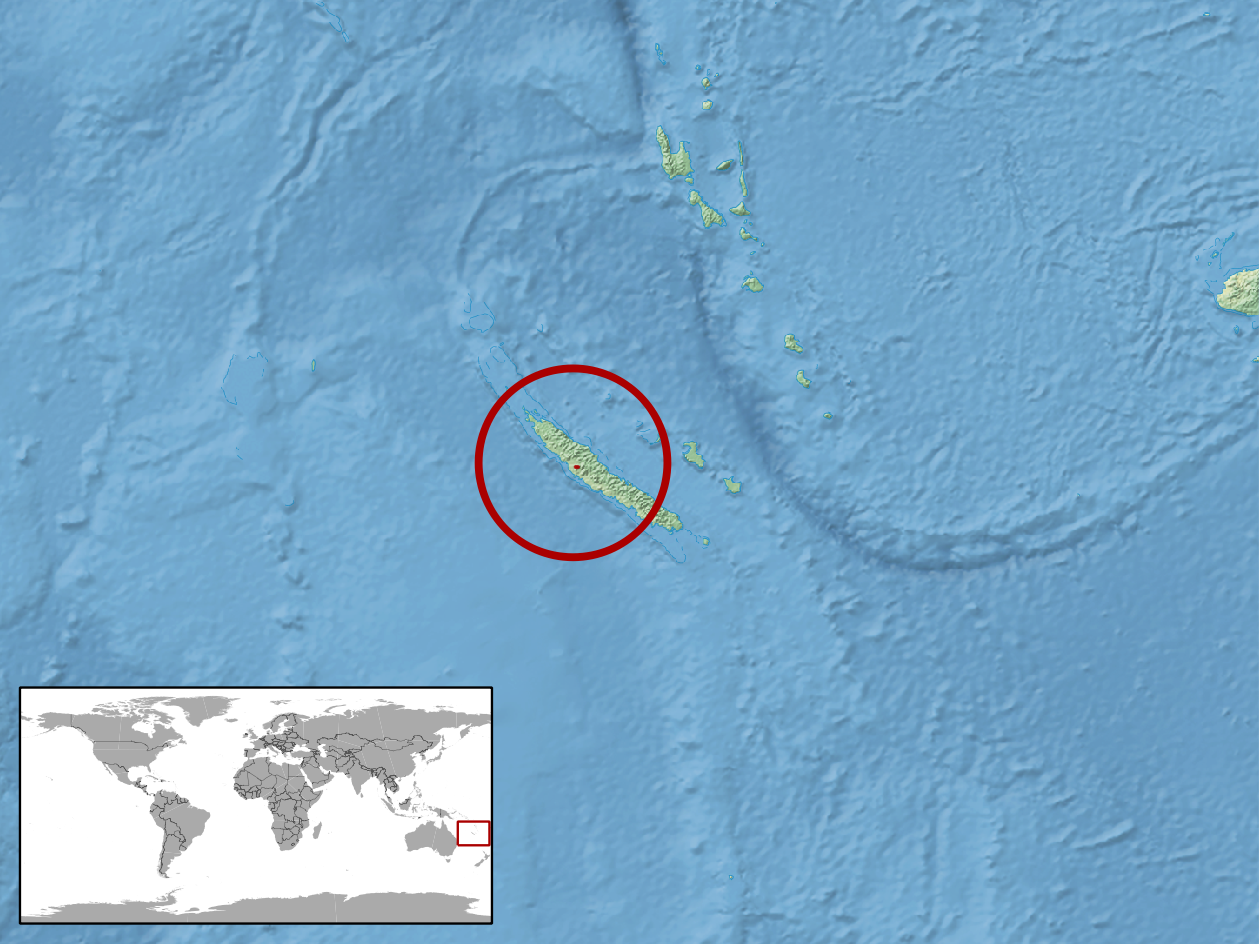
- Nannoscincus manautei distribution

Conservation status
- Critically Endangered (IUCN 3.1)

Scientific classification
- Kingdom: Animalia
- Phylum: Chordata
- Class: Reptilia
- Order: Squamata
- Family: Scincidae
- Genus: Nannoscincus
- Species: N. manautei

Binomial name
- Nannoscincus manautei Sadlier, Bauer, A. Whitaker, & S.A. Smith, 2004

= Nannoscincus manautei =

Species of lizard

Nannoscincus manautei is a species of lizard in the subfamily Eugongylinae of the family Scincidae (skinks). The species is endemic to New Caledonia.

== Etymology ==
The specific name, manautei, is in honor of Joseph Manauté, Assistant Minister for Agriculture, New Caledonia.

== Habitat ==
The preferred natural habitat of Nannoscincus manautei is forest, at altitudes of 750–1,000 m (2,460–3,280 ft).

== Behavior ==
Nannoscincus manautei is terrestrial and semifossorial.

== Reproduction ==
Nannoscincus manautei is oviparous.
