= Urocotyledon =

Scientific classification
- Kingdom: Animalia
- Phylum: Chordata
- Class: Reptilia
- Order: Squamata
- Suborder: Gekkota
- Family: Gekkonidae
- Subfamily: Uroplatinae
- Genus: Urocotyledon; Kluge, 1983

Genus of lizards

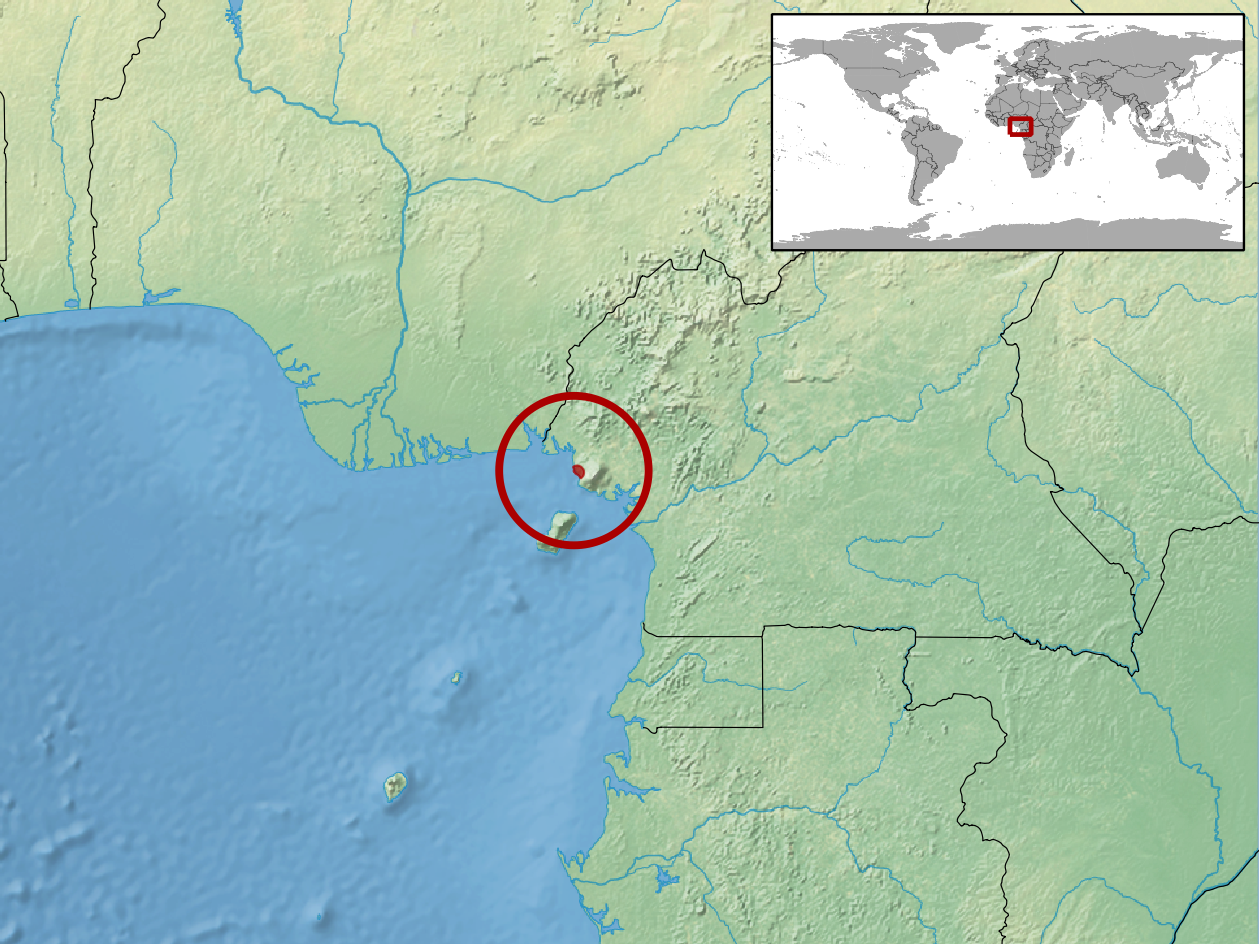

Urocotyledon is a genus of lizards in the family Gekkonidae. The genus is endemic to Africa.

== Geographic range ==
Species in the genus Urocotyledon are found on the African mainland and on associated islands.

== Species ==
Six species are recognized as being valid.

- Urocotyledon inexpectata (Stejneger, 1893) – Seychelles sucker-tailed gecko, Seychelles surprise gecko
- Urocotyledon norzilensis Lobon-Rovira, Rocha, Gower, Perara, & Harris, 2022
- Urocotyledon palmata (Mocquard, 1902) – Congo palm gecko
- Urocotyledon rasmusseni Bauer & Menegon, 2006 – Rasmussen's gecko
- Urocotyledon weileri (L. Müller, 1909) – Weiler's gecko
- Urocotyledon wolterstorffi (Tornier, 1900) – Wolterstorff's gecko

Nota bene: A binomial authority in parentheses indicates that the species was originally described in a genus other than Urocotyledon.
