= Urocotyledon norzilensis =

Scientific classification
- Kingdom: Animalia
- Phylum: Chordata
- Class: Reptilia
- Order: Squamata
- Suborder: Gekkota
- Family: Gekkonidae
- Genus: Urocotyledon
- Species: U. norzilensis

Binomial name
- Urocotyledon norzilensis Lobon-Rovira, Rocha, Gower, Perara, & Harris, 2022

Species of lizard

Urocotyledon norzilensis is a species of lizard in the family Gekkonidae. The species is endemic to Praslin in the Seychelles.
