= Nannoscincus rankini =

Conservation status
- Critically Endangered (IUCN 3.1)

Scientific classification
- Kingdom: Animalia
- Phylum: Chordata
- Class: Reptilia
- Order: Squamata
- Family: Scincidae
- Genus: Nannoscincus
- Species: N. rankini

Binomial name
- Nannoscincus rankini Sadlier, 1987

Species of lizard

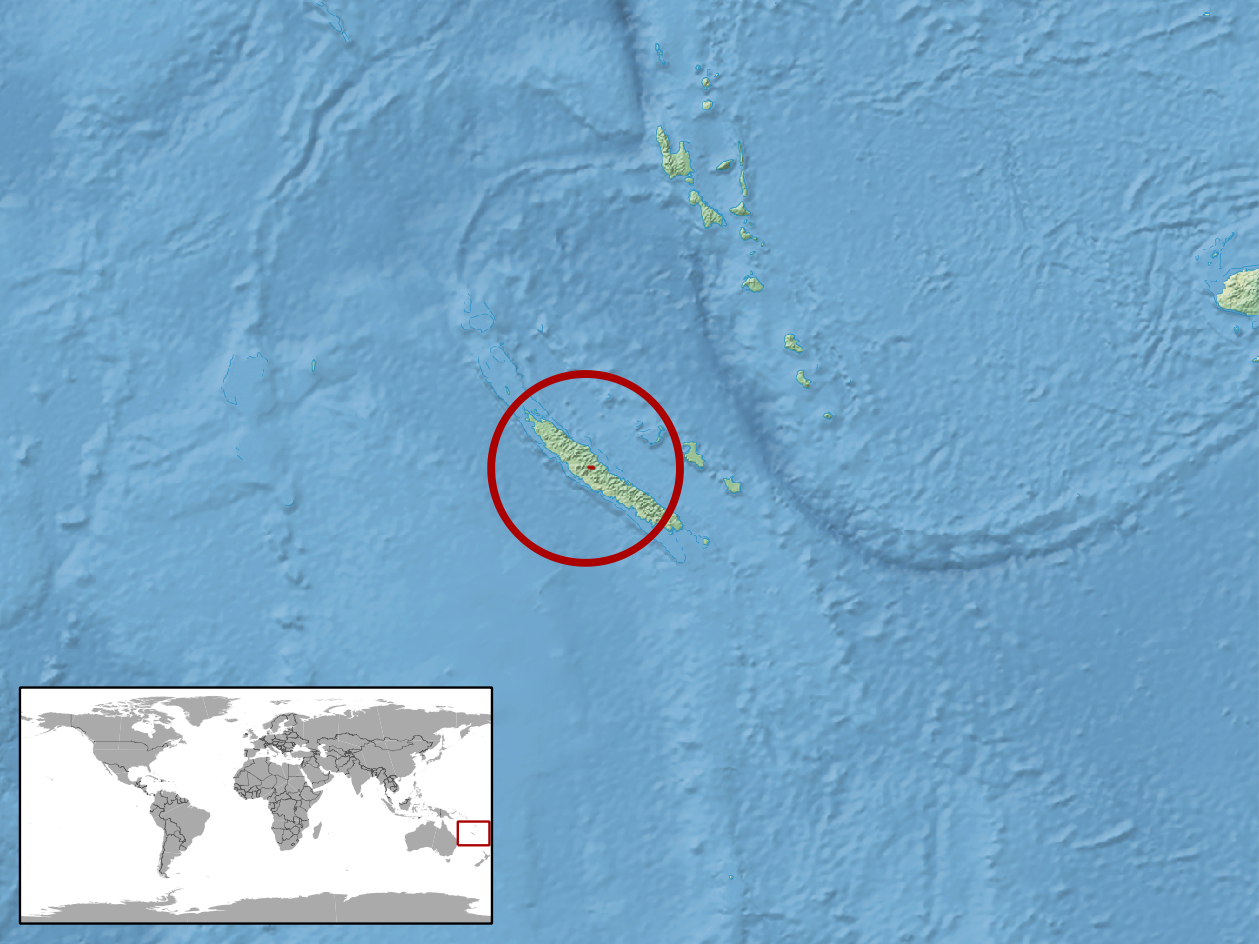
geographic distribution of Nannoscincus rankini

Nannoscincus rankini, Rankin's elf skink, is a species of skink found in New Caledonia.
