= Thermophis shangrila =

Conservation status
- Endangered (IUCN 3.1)

Scientific classification
- Kingdom: Animalia
- Phylum: Chordata
- Class: Reptilia
- Order: Squamata
- Suborder: Serpentes
- Family: Colubridae
- Genus: Thermophis
- Species: T. shangrila

Binomial name
- Thermophis shangrila Peng, Lu, Huang, Guo and Zhang, 2014

Species of snake

Thermophis shangrila, the Shangri-La hot-spring snake, is a species of snake in the family, Colubridae. It is found in China.
