= Eurolophosaurus divaricatus =

Conservation status
- Least Concern (IUCN 3.1)

Scientific classification
- Kingdom: Animalia
- Phylum: Chordata
- Class: Reptilia
- Order: Squamata
- Suborder: Iguania
- Family: Tropiduridae
- Genus: Eurolophosaurus
- Species: E. divaricatus

Binomial name
- Eurolophosaurus divaricatus (Rodrigues, 1986)

Species of lizard

Eurolophosaurus divaricatus is a species of South American lava lizard in the family Tropiduridae. The species is endemic to Brazil.
