= Nannoscincus hanchisteus =

Conservation status
- Critically Endangered (IUCN 3.1)

Scientific classification
- Kingdom: Animalia
- Phylum: Chordata
- Class: Reptilia
- Order: Squamata
- Family: Scincidae
- Genus: Nannoscincus
- Species: N. hanchisteus

Binomial name
- Nannoscincus hanchisteus Bauer & Sadlier, 2000

Species of lizard

Nannoscincus hanchisteus, the Pindai dwarf skink, is a species of skink found in New Caledonia.
