= Wolterstorff's gecko =

Scientific classification
- Kingdom: Animalia
- Phylum: Chordata
- Class: Reptilia
- Order: Squamata
- Suborder: Gekkota
- Family: Gekkonidae
- Genus: Urocotyledon
- Species: U. wolterstorffi

Binomial name
- Urocotyledon wolterstorffi (Tornier, 1900)

Synonyms
- Diplodactylus wolterstorffi Tornier, 1900; Urocotyledon wolterstorffi — Kluge, 1983

Species of lizard

Wolterstorff's gecko (Urocotyledon wolterstorffi) is a species of lizard in the family Gekkonidae. The species is endemic to Tanzania.

== Etymology ==
The specific name, wolterstorffi, is in honor of German herpetologist Willy Wolterstorff.

== Geographic range ==
U. wolterstorffi is found in the Uluguru Mountains and the Usambara Mountains of Tanzania.

== Reproduction ==
U. wolterstorffi is oviparous.
