= Nannoscincus mariei =

Conservation status
- Vulnerable (IUCN 3.1)

Scientific classification
- Kingdom: Animalia
- Phylum: Chordata
- Class: Reptilia
- Order: Squamata
- Family: Scincidae
- Genus: Nannoscincus
- Species: N. mariei

Binomial name
- Nannoscincus mariei (Bavay, 1869)
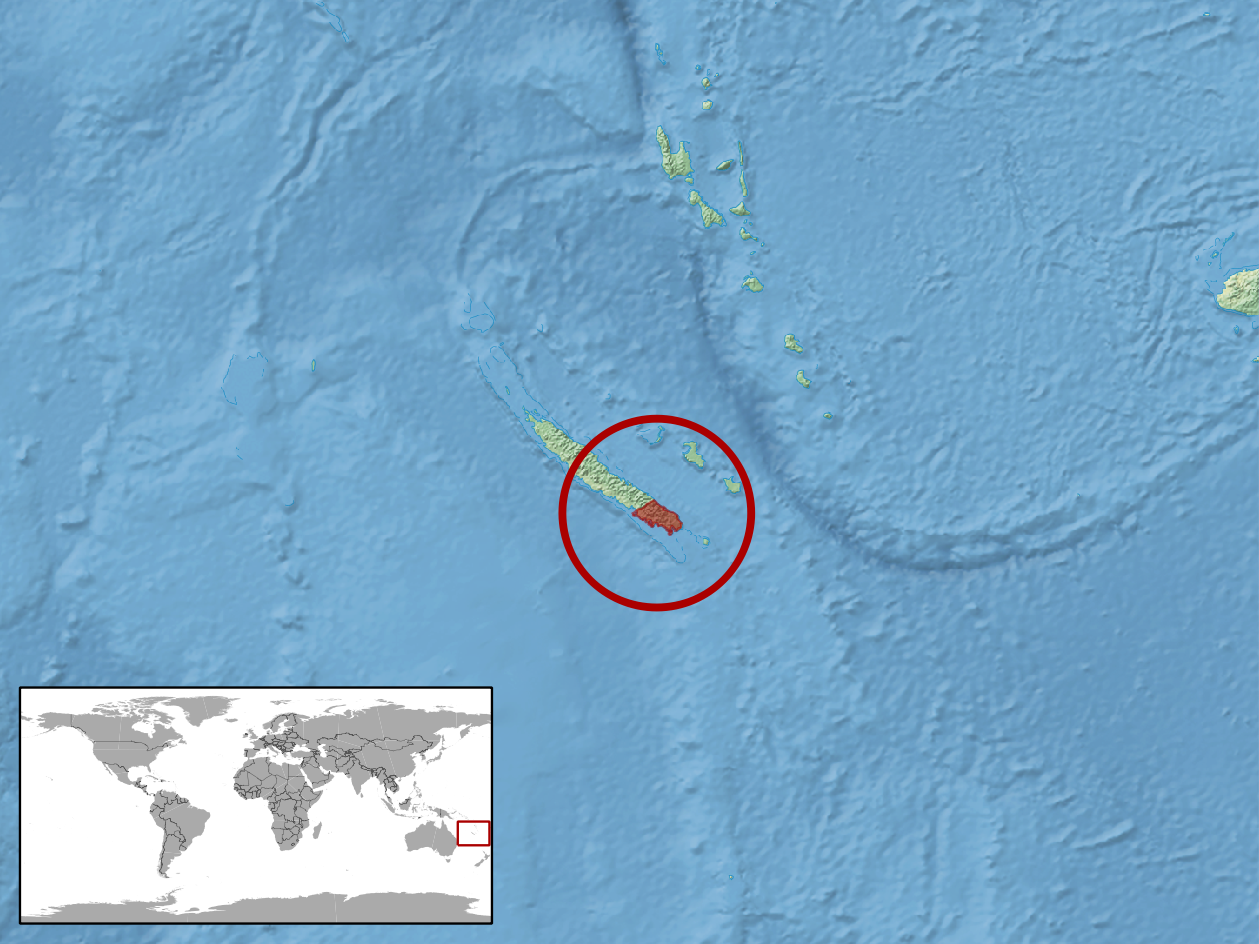
- Geographic distribution of Nannoscincus mariei

Synonyms
- Anotis mariei Bavay, 1869; Lygosoma mariæ (Bavay, 1869); Lygosoma (Leiolopisma) mariae (Bavay, 1869)

Species of lizard

Nannoscincus mariei, also known commonly as the earless dwarf skink, is a species of lizard in the subfamily Eugongylinae of the family Scincidae (skinks). The species is endemic to New Caledonia.

== Etymology ==
The specific name, mariei, is in honor of E.A. Marié, a French collector of natural history specimens in New Caledonia.

== Habitat ==
The preferred natural habitat of Nannoscincus mariei is forest, at altitudes of 150–1,100 m (490–3,610 ft).

== Behavior ==
Nannoscincus mariei is terrestrial and semi-fossorial.

== Reproduction ==
Nannoscincus mariei is oviparous.
