= Congo palm gecko =

Scientific classification
- Domain: Eukaryota
- Kingdom: Animalia
- Phylum: Chordata
- Class: Reptilia
- Order: Squamata
- Infraorder: Gekkota
- Family: Gekkonidae
- Genus: Urocotyledon
- Species: U. palmata

Binomial name
- Urocotyledon palmata (Mocquard, 1902)

Species of lizard

The Congo palm gecko (Urocotyledon palmata) is a species of lizard in the family Gekkonidae. It is found in Cameroon, Gabon, and the Republic of the Congo.
