= Nannoscincus fuscus =

Scientific classification
- Domain: Eukaryota
- Kingdom: Animalia
- Phylum: Chordata
- Class: Reptilia
- Order: Squamata
- Family: Scincidae
- Genus: Nannoscincus
- Species: N. fuscus

Binomial name
- Nannoscincus fuscus Günther, 1872

Species of lizard

Nannoscincus fuscus is a species of skink found in New Caledonia.
