= Phelsuma antanosy =

Conservation status
- Endangered (IUCN 3.1)

Scientific classification
- Kingdom: Animalia
- Phylum: Chordata
- Class: Reptilia
- Order: Squamata
- Suborder: Gekkota
- Family: Gekkonidae
- Genus: Phelsuma
- Species: P. antanosy

Binomial name
- Phelsuma antanosy Raxworthy & Nussbaum, 1993
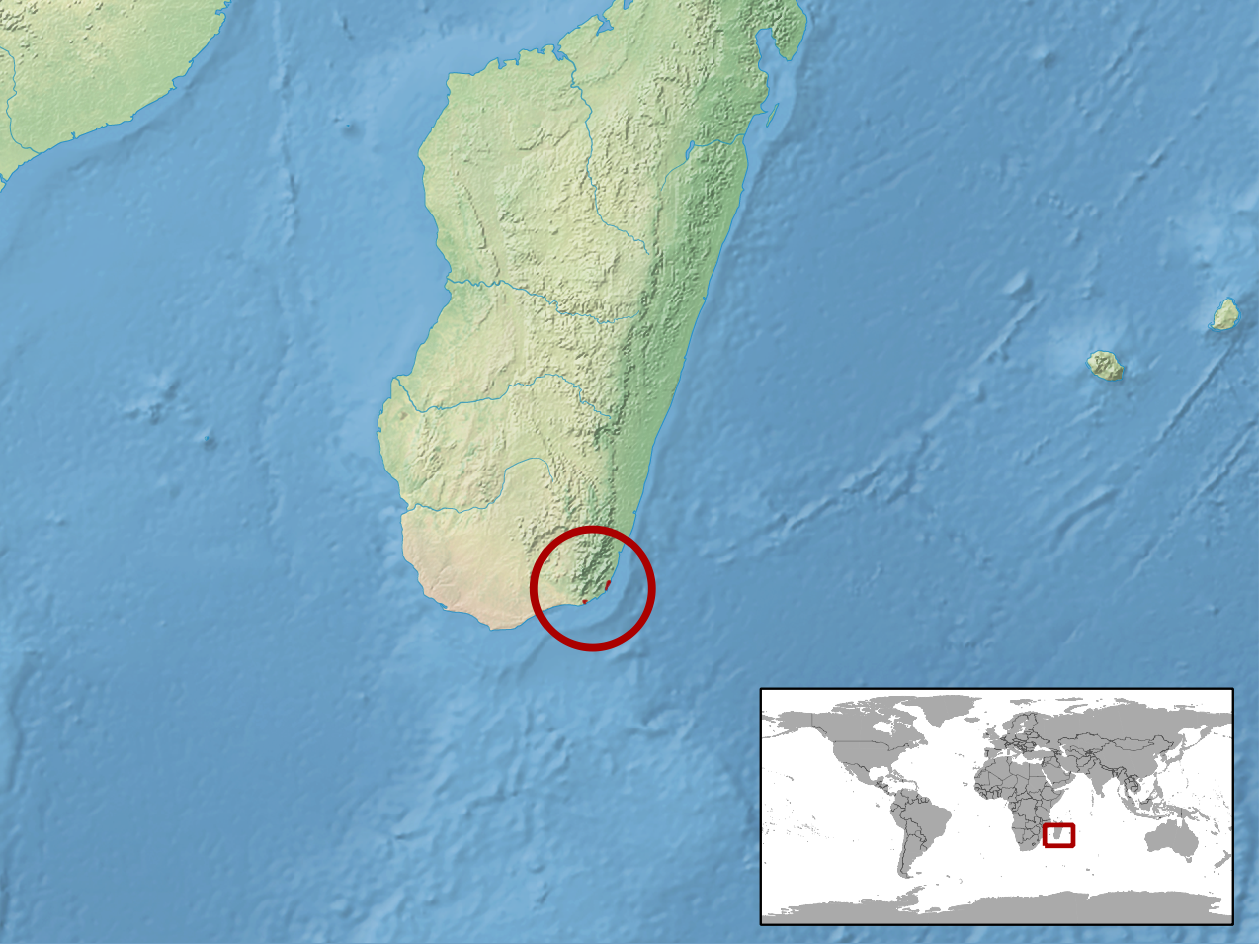

Species of lizard

Phelsuma antanosy known as Antanosy day gecko is a species of day gecko, endemic to the coastal Anosy Region in Madagascar. The species was first discovered in by scientist Raxworthy & Nussbaum in the year 1993. Phelsuma antanosy more commonly known as Antanosy day gecko is one of 45 different species represented in the Phelsuma genus. This specific species of gecko has been placed on the critically endangered list by the IUCN red list since January 28, 2011. Little is known about the Antanosy day gecko because of its recent discovery and the small amount of research done on the species. Although, information about the geographical fragmentation and population location lead to the decision to put the gecko on the critically endangered list.

== Physical Description ==
The Antanosy day gecko is considered one of the smaller species in the Phelsuma genus as it only reaches about 10 cm in length. The body of the gecko is bright green with distinct color patterns on their back and head. Three red lines run the dorsal side of the body starting at the rear end of the back. The line in the middle is the most distinct and intense in color. The head of the gecko has two red crossbar-like colorations and a reddish-brown lip line running from the nostrils to the eye. Between the crossbar-like colorations and at the edge of the eyes are blue patches. The ventral side of the gecko is completely white including the throat, belly, tail.

== Geographical Location ==
Over the years land development and deforestation in Madagascar has increased up to 50% since 1950. Much of this land is being used for mining purposes and other development. Due to such loss, the habitat of Antanosy day gecko has become fragmented and isolated into two specific areas in the Anosy Region where three subpopulations exist.

These two areas are better known as Ambatotsirongorongo and Saint Luce, Madagascar. The total amount of land that the Antanosy day gecko is expected to live in is about 16 square kilometers (6.2 square miles). These isolated patches are approximately located 0.1 to 4 kilometers (0.062 to 2.485 miles) from the coast.

== Habitat and Ecology ==
Littoral and transitional forests along with degraded forest with dense overhead canopy serve as sufficient habitat for the Antanosy day gecko. The Antanosy day gecko is highly reliant of the screw palm plant species Pandanus. Female geckos use these plants specifically for egg laying.

The Antanosy day gecko forages for food during day and night hours. Plants such as Dypsis palms like Saint Luce Dypsis (D. sainteluccei) and Ravenala madagascariensis serve a sufficient food source.

== Population ==
As of now the three subpopulations exist in Ambatotsirongorongo and Saint Luce, Madagascar. About 40% of the total population is located within Saint Luce while the remaining 60% is located within Ambatotsirongorongo. Due to the isolation and fragmentation between the two areas, the population of the gecko is considered to be severely fragmented. Estimates say there is only 5,000-10,000 individuals left resulting in a population density of about 10 individuals per hectare in suitable habitat. Deforestation and habitat destruction has resulted in an overall decreasing population trend.

== Status ==
As of 2025 the IUCN downgraded the Antanosy Day Gecko from Critically Endangered to Endangered despite the decrease in its population.

== Threats ==
Due to deforestation and habitat destruction, the Antanosy day gecko is losing more and more land they can potentially inhabit, especially the plants they rely on so heavily. The screw palm plant species Pandanus is slow to grow and regenerate, leaving the gecko without its habitat. Although, some of the areas the Antanosy day gecko reside in are considered protected areas, there is still plenty of illegal deforestation happening. Much of the land is put under pressure on by the government and local people as forest resources are being destroyed for personal use and a possible mining plan. Potentially resulting in the loss of individuals ranking as high as 20% of the population.

== Conservation Acts ==
The SEED Conservation Research Program (SCRP) and the Mohamed bin Zayed Species Conservation fund has set out a team of researchers and volunteers to start collecting data on the Antanosy day gecko. SCRP is hoping that with the data collected from studying the gecko's behavior and surrounding environment a captive breeding effort or even transporting the population can result in their survival. A captive breeding population can be used to increase the overall population as the offspring will be protected from outside interactions which can lead to successful restoration. Transportation of the gecko population could place the species in an area that has the same relative habitat landscape that is registered as a designated protected area ensuring the survival of the future population.

SCRP is also conducting educational sessions in Saint Luce schools and a conservation club to share information about the Antanosy day gecko. Staff and volunteers talk about the various threats that impede the survival of the gecko and the consequences there is due to endemism. Also, locals guides are being trained to correctly pass on information to the community so they will be able to monitor the survival of the Antanosy day gecko.
