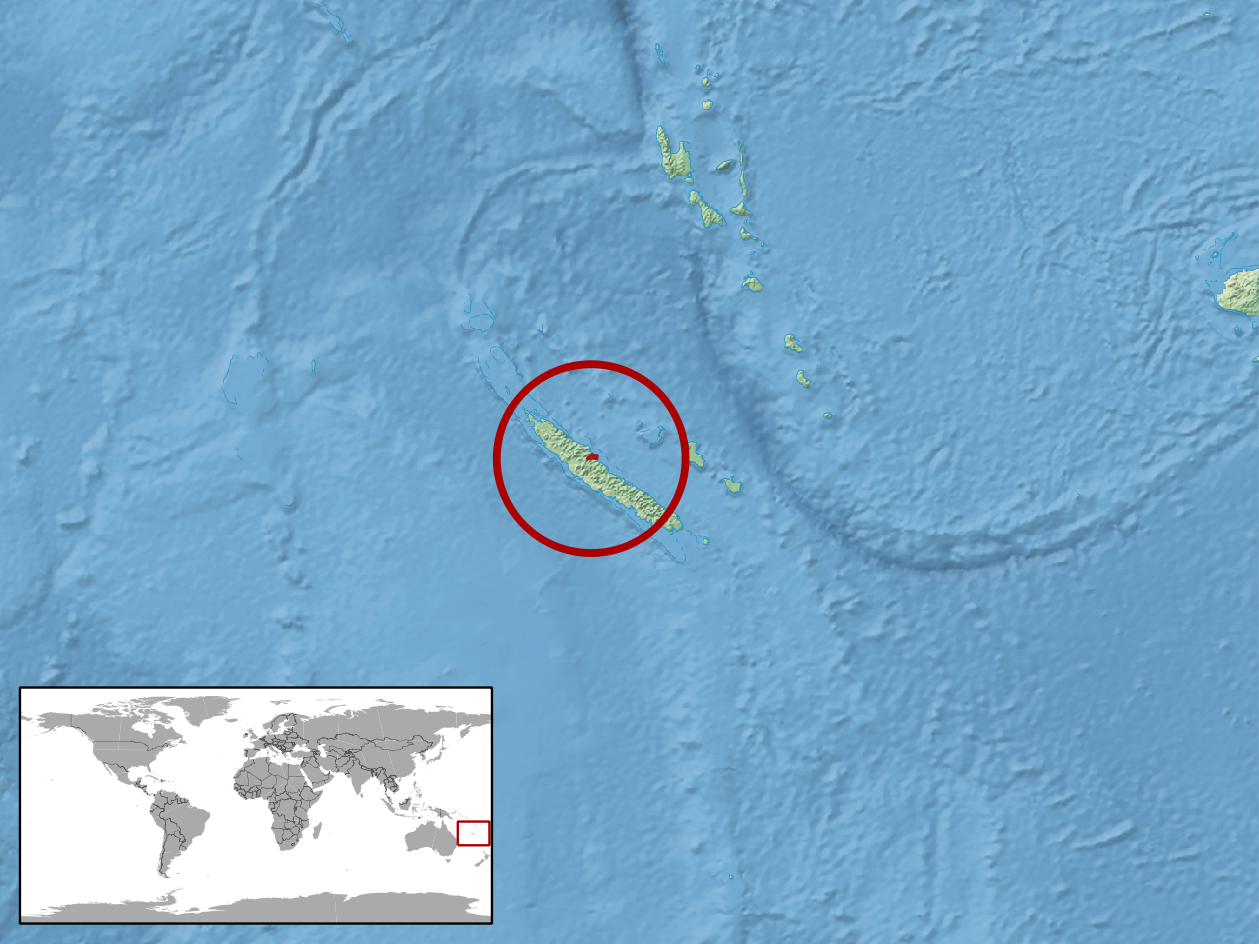
- Nannoscincus greeri distribution

Conservation status
- Endangered (IUCN 3.1)

Scientific classification
- Kingdom: Animalia
- Phylum: Chordata
- Class: Reptilia
- Order: Squamata
- Family: Scincidae
- Genus: Nannoscincus
- Species: N. greeri

Binomial name
- Nannoscincus greeri Sadlier, 1987

= Nannoscincus greeri =

Species of lizard

Nannoscincus greeri, Greer's elf skink, is a species of skink found in New Caledonia.
