= Nannoscincus garrulus =

Conservation status
- Endangered (IUCN 3.1)

Scientific classification
- Kingdom: Animalia
- Phylum: Chordata
- Class: Reptilia
- Order: Squamata
- Family: Scincidae
- Genus: Nannoscincus
- Species: N. garrulus

Binomial name
- Nannoscincus garrulus Sadlier, Bauer, & Smith, 2006
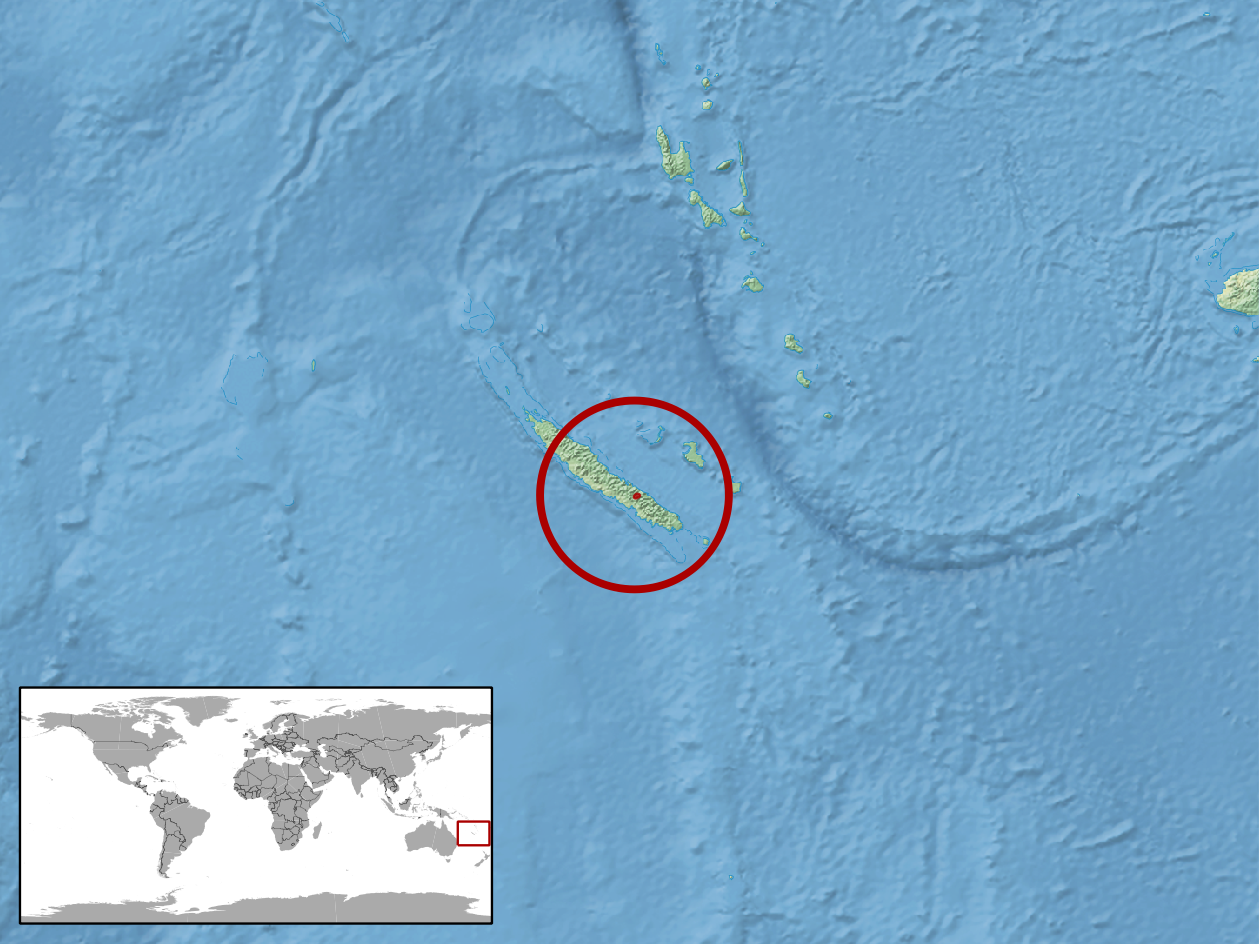

Species of lizard

Nannoscincus garrulus is a species of skink found in New Caledonia.
