= Cyrtodactylus sworderi =

Conservation status
- Endangered (IUCN 3.1)

Scientific classification
- Kingdom: Animalia
- Phylum: Chordata
- Class: Reptilia
- Order: Squamata
- Suborder: Gekkota
- Family: Gekkonidae
- Genus: Cyrtodactylus
- Species: C. sworderi

Binomial name
- Cyrtodactylus sworderi (M.A. Smith, 1925)
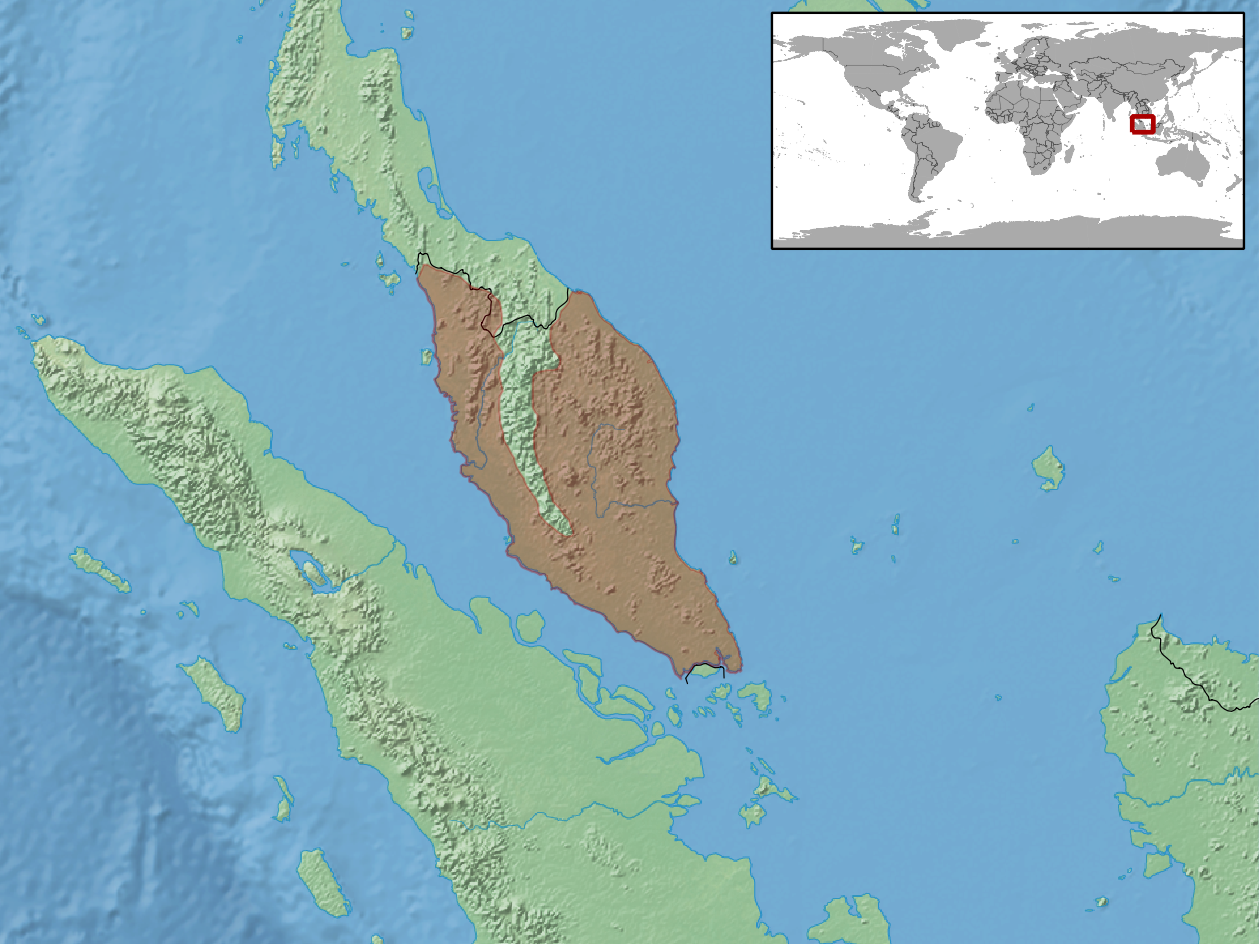

Synonyms
- Gymnodactylus sworderi M.A. Smith, 1925; Cyrtodactylus sworderi — Rösler, 2000

Species of lizard

Cyrtodactylus sworderi, also known commonly as the Johore bow-fingered gecko, the Kota-tinggi forest gecko, and Sworder's bent-toed gecko, is a species of lizard in the family Gekkonidae. The species is endemic to Malaysia.

== Etymology ==
The specific name, sworderi, is in honor of Mr. Hope Sworder, who collected the holotype.

== Geographic range ==
C. sworderi is known from the Malaysian state of Johor.

== Habitat ==
The preferred natural habitats of C. sworderi are desert and freshwater wetlands.

== Description ==
Adults of C. sworderi have a snout-to-vent length (SVL) of 7–8 cm (2.8–3.1 in).

== Reproduction ==
C. sworderi is oviparous.
