= Anolis pygmaeus =

Conservation status
- Endangered (IUCN 3.1)

Scientific classification
- Kingdom: Animalia
- Phylum: Chordata
- Class: Reptilia
- Order: Squamata
- Suborder: Iguania
- Family: Dactyloidae
- Genus: Anolis
- Species: A. pygmaeus

Binomial name
- Anolis pygmaeus Álvarez Del Toro & Smith, 1956

Species of lizard

Anolis pygmaeus, the Chiapas pygmy anole, is a species of lizard in the family Dactyloidae. The species is found in Mexico.
