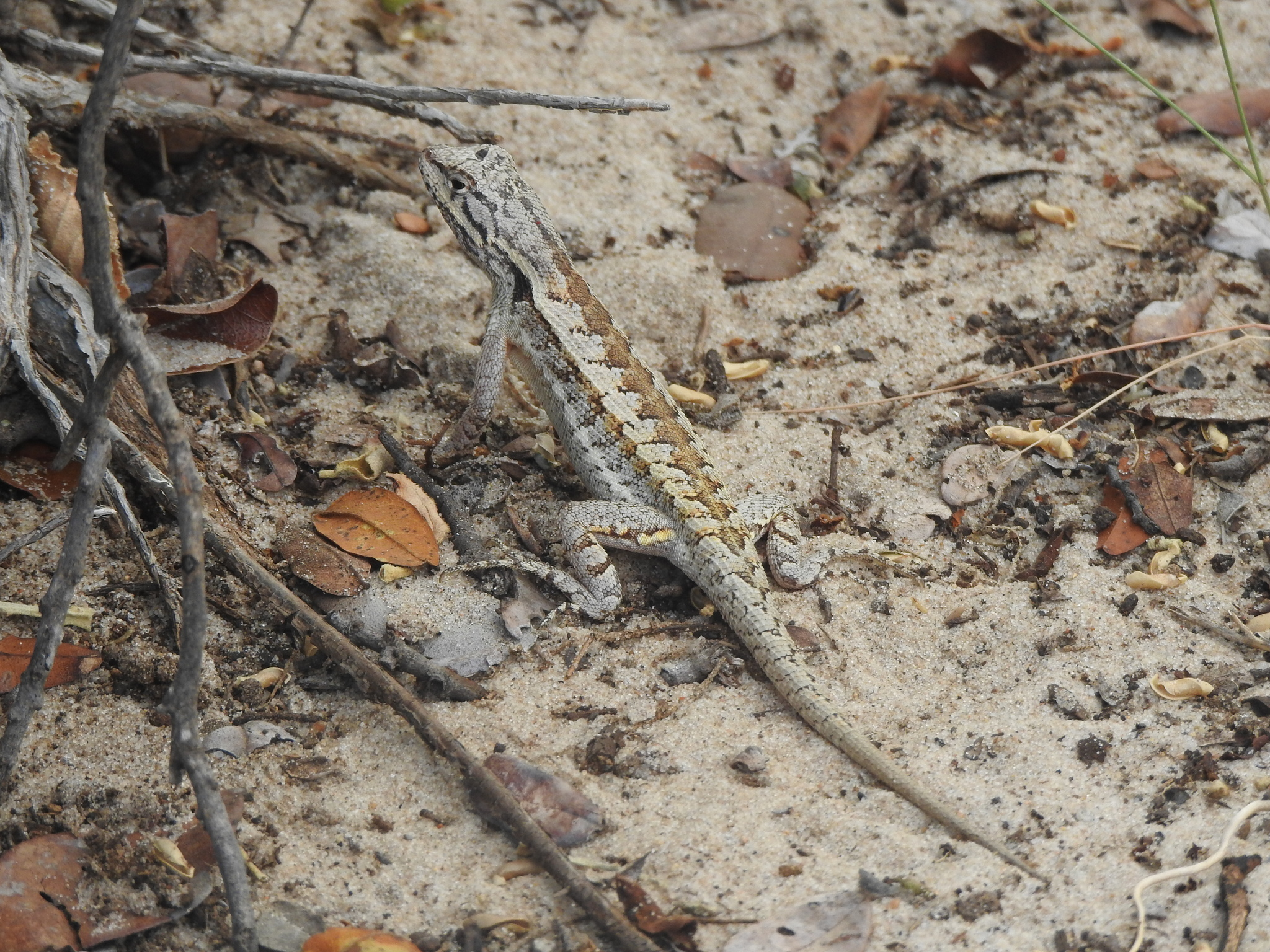

Conservation status
- Endangered (IUCN 3.1)

Scientific classification
- Kingdom: Animalia
- Phylum: Chordata
- Class: Reptilia
- Order: Squamata
- Suborder: Iguania
- Family: Tropiduridae
- Genus: Eurolophosaurus
- Species: E. amathites

Binomial name
- Eurolophosaurus amathites (Rodrigues, 1984)

Synonyms
- Tropidurus amathites Rodrigues, 1984

= Eurolophosaurus amathites =

Species of lizard

Eurolophosaurus amathites, the Amathites lava lizard, is a species of South American lava lizard in the family Tropiduridae. The species is endemic to Brazil.
