= Nannoscincus humectus =

Conservation status
- Endangered (IUCN 3.1)

Scientific classification
- Kingdom: Animalia
- Phylum: Chordata
- Class: Reptilia
- Order: Squamata
- Family: Scincidae
- Genus: Nannoscincus
- Species: N. humectus

Binomial name
- Nannoscincus humectus Bauer & Sadlier, 2000

Species of lizard

Nannoscincus humectus, the Forêt Plate dwarf skink, is a species of skink found in Province Nord, New Caledonia. Its geographical distribution is very limited as it occurs in only two locations in Province Nord, totalling an area of occupancy of 12 km^{2} (4.6 sq mi). This distribution and the skink's population have been decreasing, for these reasons it is classified by the IUCN as Endangered.
