= Weiler's gecko =

Conservation status
- Endangered (IUCN 3.1)

Scientific classification
- Kingdom: Animalia
- Phylum: Chordata
- Class: Reptilia
- Order: Squamata
- Suborder: Gekkota
- Family: Gekkonidae
- Genus: Urocotyledon
- Species: U. weileri

Binomial name
- Urocotyledon weileri (L. Müller, 1909)

Synonyms
- Diplodactylus weileri L. Müller, 1909; Phyllodactylus weileri — Wermuth, 1965; Urocotyledon weileri — Kluge, 1983

Species of lizard

Weiler's gecko (Urocotyledon weileri) is a species of lizard in the family Gekkonidae. The species is endemic to Cameroon.

== Etymology ==
The specific name, weileri, is in honor of Justus Weiler who collected the holotype in Cameroon.

== Habitat ==
The natural habitat of U. weileri is forest.

== Reproduction ==
U. weileri is oviparous.
