= Cope's arboreal alligator lizard =

Conservation status
- Endangered (IUCN 3.1)
- CITES Appendix II

Scientific classification
- Kingdom: Animalia
- Phylum: Chordata
- Class: Reptilia
- Order: Squamata
- Suborder: Anguimorpha
- Family: Anguidae
- Genus: Abronia
- Species: A. aurita

Binomial name
- Abronia aurita Cope, 1869

Species of lizard

Cope's arboreal alligator lizard (Abronia aurita) is a species of lizard found in two isolated locations in Guatemala, one in the Alta Verapaz Department and one in the Jalapa Department. These lizard are found only in high altitudes of 2,000 to 2,600 feet above sea level, on the west and south sides of the mountain ranges. This lizard is one of 28 species of alligator lizards, most being arboreal, meaning they live in trees. These omnivores are considered endangered because of their small population size and they face extinction due to habitat degradation and from pressures of the pet trade.

== Distribution and habitat ==
Cope's arboreal alligator lizard, also known as Abronia aurita, is a species of alligator lizard found only in roughly 400 square kilometers of Guatemala. Specifically, the only suitable habitat for this species is between 2,000 and 2,600 feet above sea level on the west and south sides of Sierra de Xucaneb in the Department of Alta Verapaz. These species are considered arboreal, meaning they live in trees. They prefer to make their homes in the trunks of decaying, large trees, found in Oak or Pine forests. High tree density is considered optimal for these creatures as this ensures adequate habitat opportunities and resource abundance. Trees that are covered with growth such as mosses, ferns or bromeliads serve as their main habitat source as these additions contribute toward important factors in insulation and moisture control.

== Physical characteristics ==
Typical snout to vent length will fall within the range of 7.8 to 18.4 cm, with the length of the tail being roughly twice as long as the body. These creatures are covered with scales, the scales located on their stomach being slightly keeled while the other scales on their body remain flat. They have a general green color around their body but shades vary due to environmental variation and season. All alligator lizards have yellow eyes, with a long, slender, forked tongue. A. aurita can be distinguished from other similar alligator lizards by having a slightly more pale green color on their scales, accompanied by black molting around the edges. One way you can tell the difference between the male and the female are by head shape, the male will sometimes have a slightly broader head than the female. In addition, adult males can be distinguished as having orange coloration on the posterior third portion of the scales on the dorsal side of their head. However, most of these distinctions are only noticed by a professional and it can be tricky for amateurs to tell the two sexes apart.

== Behavior ==
This lizard is usually slow moving, but it is typical for them to drop to the ground when disturbed, followed by them quickly escaping to a safe environment if they feel threatened. Although they can survive in temperatures that range as far as 40 to 90 ̊F, they will move considerably slower when their environment is below 50 ̊F. In these colder temperatures, these lizards will also den together in rotten tree trunks and under moss to conserve warmth and energy. They will be most active when temperatures lie in the range of 75 to 80 ̊F and will often be seen sunbathing and searching for food in the hours of late morning. A. aurita have also reported to be calm in captivity, if properly cared for. They can also be prone to biting if handled aggressively or not fed at regular intervals. If their containment is kept outside of their optimal temperature zone, they will often hide in their artificial shelters, trying to conserve energy or hide from the light.

== Diet ==
A. aurita are primarily omnivores, but can live on either insects or plants for long periods of time. In times of optimal conditions, they will often prefer to forage for abundant insects such as crickets and grasshoppers as well as other invertebrates such as caterpillars, snails, spiders and mealworms. In addition, alligator lizards also rely on eating bromeliads, which serve as a vital source of energy when insect abundance depletes. Because of this, presence of bromeliads growing on and around their habitat is an important factor when determining their immediate habitat location.

== Reproduction and lifecycle ==
It typically takes Cope's arboreal alligator lizards until the second reproductive season for them to be large and sexually mature enough to reproduce. These lizards are viviparous (they do not lay eggs like many other reptiles), but will give birth to live pups. The mating ritual of this alligator lizard is similar to other lizards, which will begin with the male lizard biting the head of the female in a display of his strength and fitness for mating. They will remain in this position until the female succumbs to the male and allows him to mate with her. This embrace could last for several hours. Each female will only give birth to one litter per year, of between 7 and 14 babies per litter. The breeding season for this species can be as broad as July to November with the newborns being delivered between the months of March to July. The gestation period for this lizard is between 6 and 8 months, during which time the female will gain weight and develop what is known as "chalk sacs" on her jowls as a calcium supply. After birth, she does not provide any postnatal care to her young. Once born, these lizards do not need to rely on a limited diet, but can begin consuming the same material as their adult counterparts.

== Threats ==
The major threat to biodiversity for the Cope's arboreal alligator lizard is determined by the IUCN Red List to be the destruction of their habitat. Degradation and fragmentation of their suitable habitat has occurred as a side effect from construction, agricultural formation, and coal mining, as these activities require deforestation in these areas. These lizards are also frequently used in the pet trade, taking them from their native habitats and distributing them around the globe, which also depletes their native population sizes. Their native geographic range in Guatemala is not currently under protection for conservation or restoration efforts.
