= Liolaemus scapularis =

Conservation status
- Endangered (IUCN 3.1)

Scientific classification
- Kingdom: Animalia
- Phylum: Chordata
- Class: Reptilia
- Order: Squamata
- Suborder: Iguania
- Family: Liolaemidae
- Genus: Liolaemus
- Species: L. scapularis

Binomial name
- Liolaemus scapularis Laurent, 1982

Species of lizard

Liolaemus scapularis, the shoulder tree iguana, is a species of lizard in the family Iguanidae. It is from Argentina.
