= Anolis armouri =

Conservation status
- Endangered (IUCN 3.1)

Scientific classification
- Kingdom: Animalia
- Phylum: Chordata
- Class: Reptilia
- Order: Squamata
- Suborder: Iguania
- Family: Dactyloidae
- Genus: Anolis
- Species: A. armouri

Binomial name
- Anolis armouri (Cochran, 1934)

Species of lizard

Anolis armouri, the black-throated stout anole or armoured anole, is a species of lizard in the family Dactyloidae. The species is found in Hispaniola.
