= Lygodactylus roavolana =

Conservation status
- Endangered (IUCN 3.1)

Scientific classification
- Kingdom: Animalia
- Phylum: Chordata
- Class: Reptilia
- Order: Squamata
- Suborder: Gekkota
- Family: Gekkonidae
- Genus: Lygodactylus
- Species: L. roavolana

Binomial name
- Lygodactylus roavolana Puente, Glaw, Vieites, & Vences, 2009
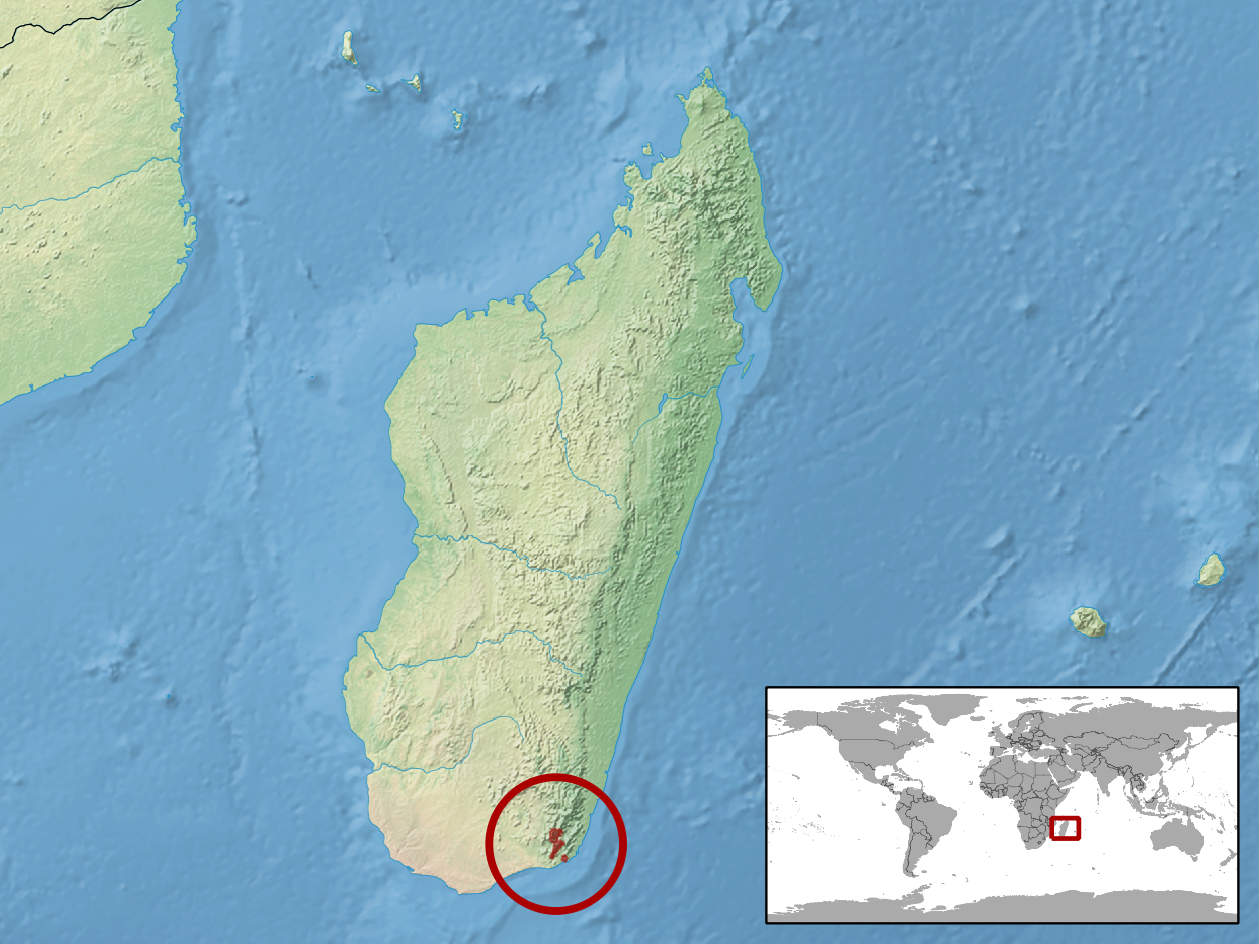

Species of lizard

Lygodactylus roavolana is a species of gecko endemic to the island of Madagascar.
