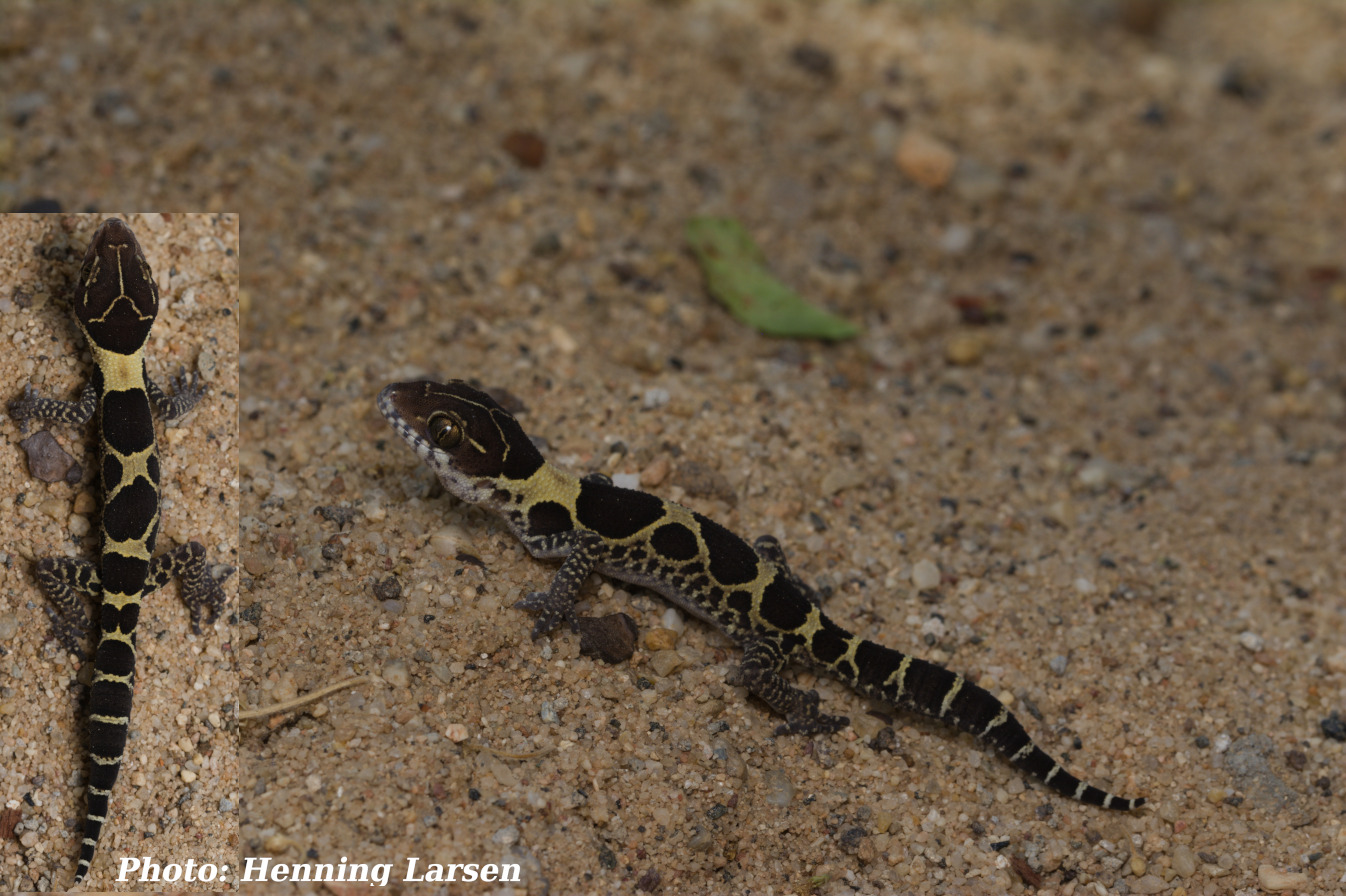

Conservation status
- Endangered (IUCN 3.1)

Scientific classification
- Kingdom: Animalia
- Phylum: Chordata
- Class: Reptilia
- Order: Squamata
- Suborder: Gekkota
- Family: Gekkonidae
- Genus: Cyrtodactylus
- Species: C. brevidactylus

Binomial name
- Cyrtodactylus brevidactylus Bauer, 2002
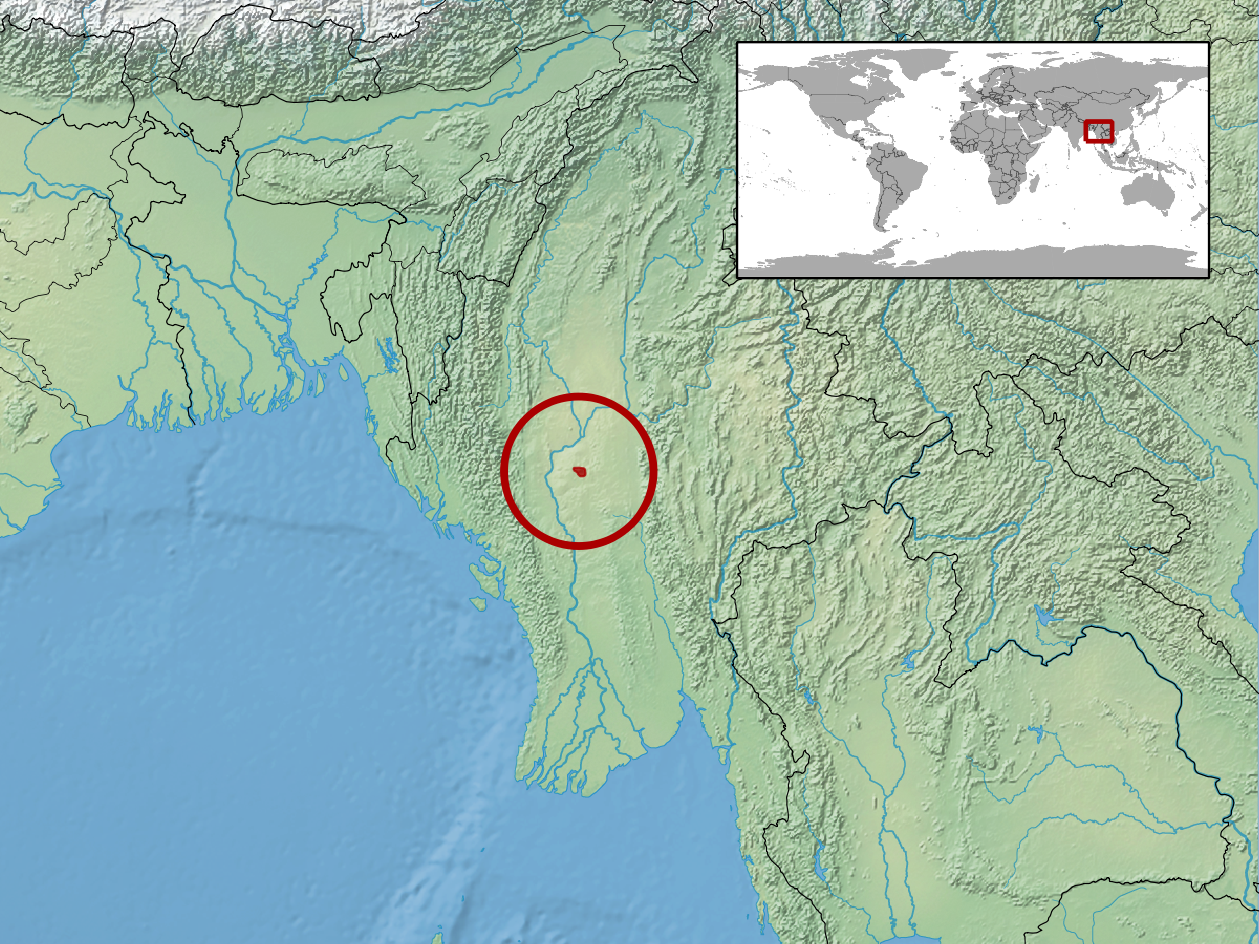

= Cyrtodactylus brevidactylus =

Species of lizard

Cyrtodactylus brevidactylus is a nocturnal and terrestrial species of gecko that is found in Myanmar. It is an insectivore and eats most insects and arthropods that it comes across.
