= Anolis marron =

Conservation status
- Least Concern (IUCN 3.1)

Scientific classification
- Kingdom: Animalia
- Phylum: Chordata
- Class: Reptilia
- Order: Squamata
- Suborder: Iguania
- Family: Anolidae
- Genus: Anolis
- Species: A. marron

Binomial name
- Anolis marron Arnold, 1980

Species of lizard

Anolis marron, the Jacmel gracile anole or Jacmel anole, is a species of lizard in the family Dactyloidae. The species is found in Haiti.
