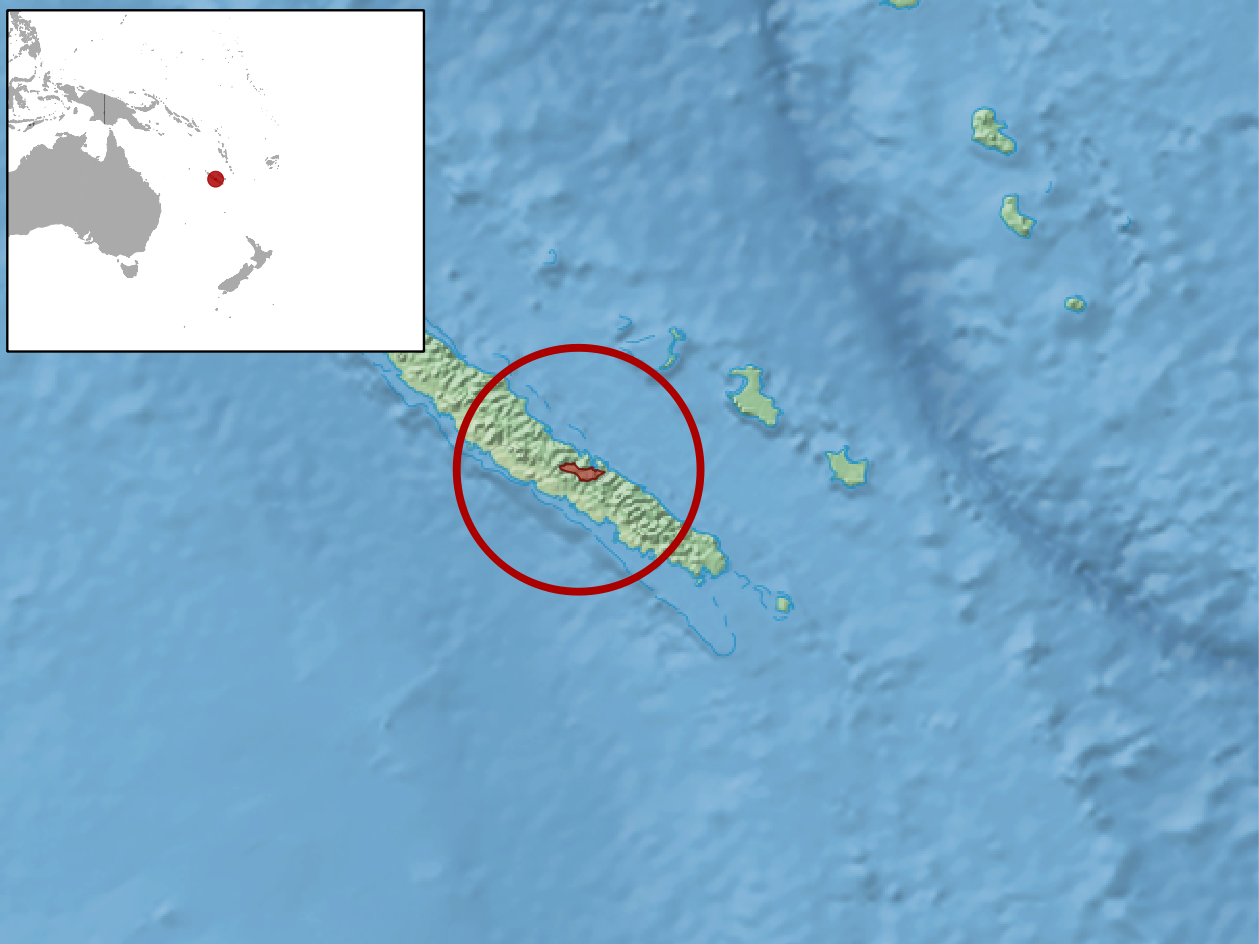
- Distribution of Nannoscincus slevini

Conservation status
- Endangered (IUCN 3.1)

Scientific classification
- Kingdom: Animalia
- Phylum: Chordata
- Class: Reptilia
- Order: Squamata
- Family: Scincidae
- Genus: Nannoscincus
- Species: N. slevini

Binomial name
- Nannoscincus slevini (Loveridge, 1941)

Synonyms
- Lygosoma slevini Loveridge, 1941; Anotis slevini — Greer, 1974; Nannoscincus sleveni [sic] Sadlier, 1987 (ex errore); Nannoscincus slevini — Bauer & Vindum, 1990

= Nannoscincus slevini =

Species of lizard

Nannoscincus slevini, also known commonly as Slevin's elf skink and Slevin's dwarf skink, is an endangered species of lizard in the family Scincidae. The species is endemic to New Caledonia.

== Etymology ==
The specific name, slevini, is in honor of American herpetologist Joseph Richard Slevin.

== Habitat ==
The preferred natural habitat of N. slevini is forest, at altitudes of 400–900 m (1,300–3,000 ft).

== Description ==
N. slevini may attain a snout-to-vent length (SVL) of 4.3 cm (1.7 in). It has only four toes on each front foot.
