= Celatiscincus euryotis =

Conservation status
- Endangered (IUCN 3.1)

Scientific classification
- Kingdom: Animalia
- Phylum: Chordata
- Class: Reptilia
- Order: Squamata
- Suborder: Scinciformata
- Infraorder: Scincomorpha
- Family: Eugongylidae
- Genus: Celatiscincus
- Species: C. euryotis

Binomial name
- Celatiscincus euryotis (Werner, 1910)
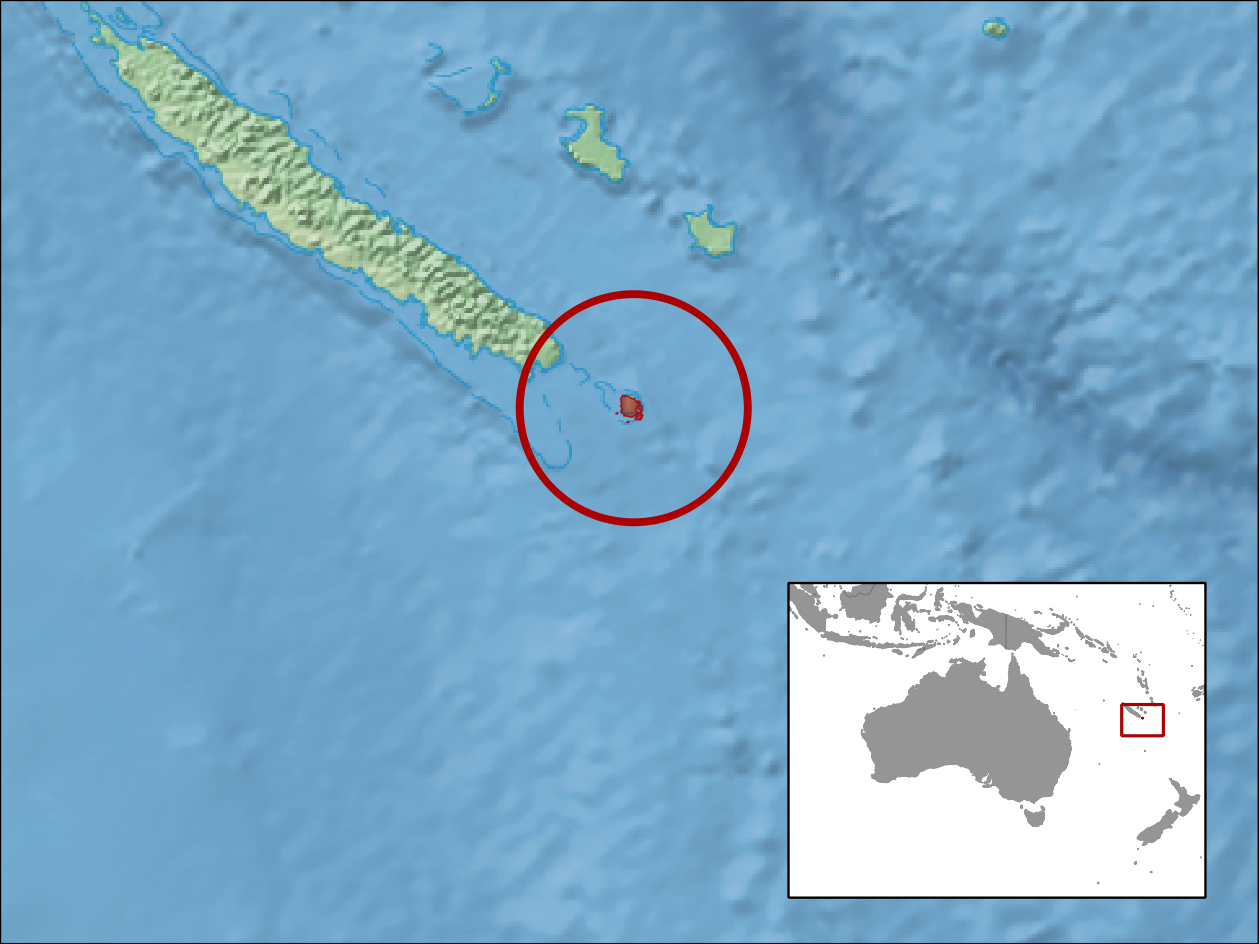
- Distribution (red)

Species of lizard

The southern pale-hipped skink (Celatiscincus euryotis) is a species of lizard in the family Scincidae. It is endemic to Isle of Pines, New Caledonia.
