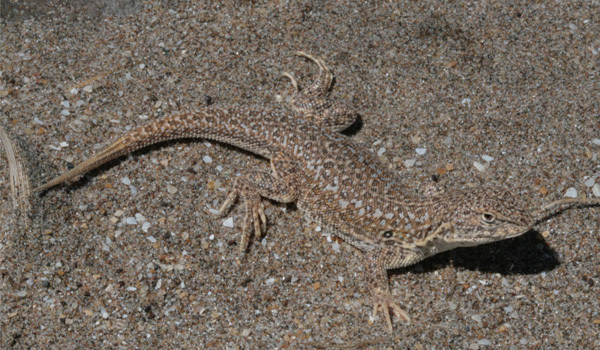

Conservation status
- Endangered (IUCN 3.1)

Scientific classification
- Kingdom: Animalia
- Phylum: Chordata
- Class: Reptilia
- Order: Squamata
- Suborder: Iguania
- Family: Liolaemidae
- Genus: Liolaemus
- Species: L. multimaculatus

Binomial name
- Liolaemus multimaculatus (Duméril & Bibron, 1837)

= Liolaemus multimaculatus =

Species of lizard

Liolaemus multimaculatus, the many-spotted tree iguana, is a species of lizard in the family Iguanidae. It is found in Argentina.
