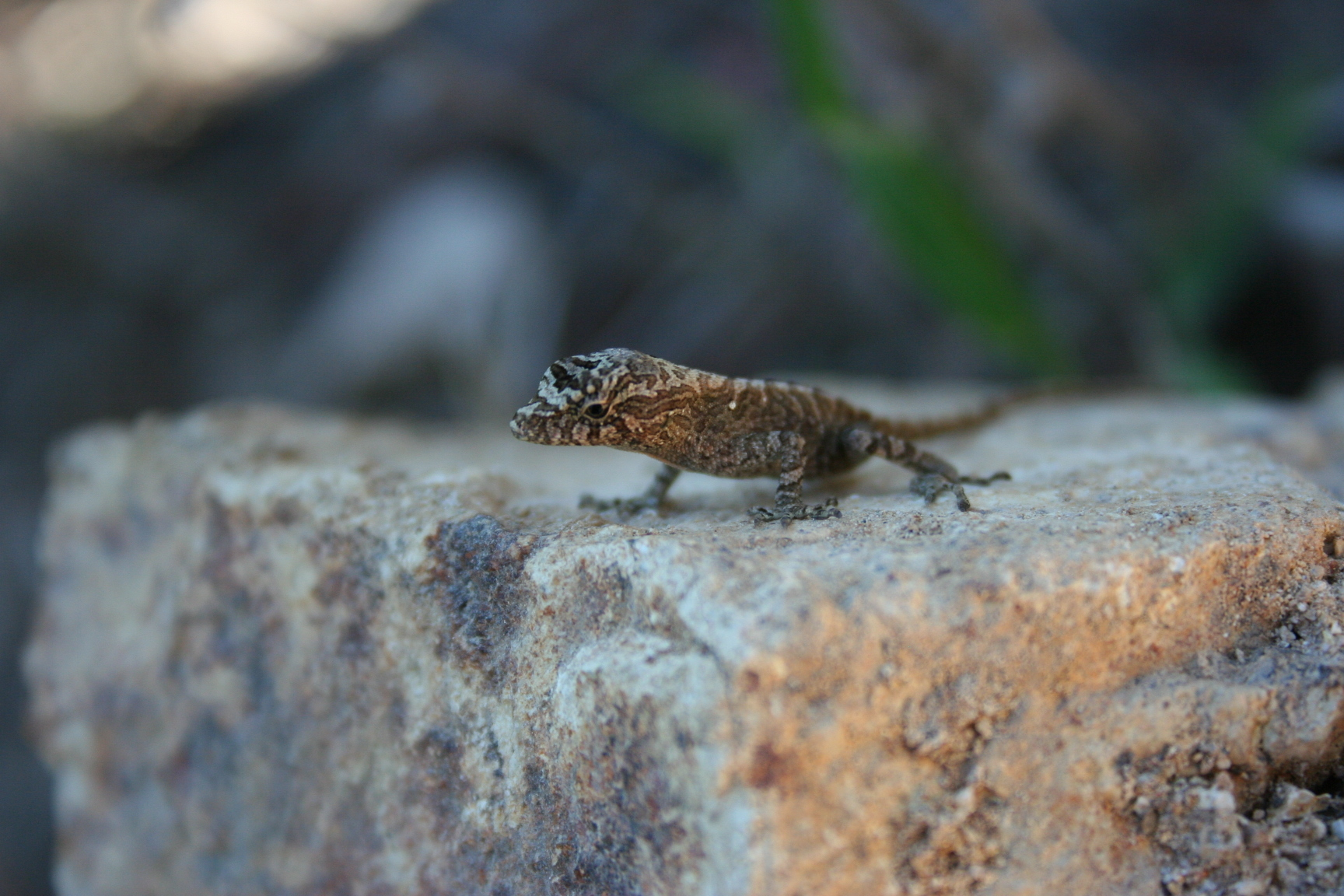

Conservation status
- Endangered (IUCN 3.1)

Scientific classification
- Kingdom: Animalia
- Phylum: Chordata
- Class: Reptilia
- Order: Squamata
- Suborder: Iguania
- Family: Dactyloidae
- Genus: Anolis
- Species: A. sminthus

Binomial name
- Anolis sminthus Dunn & Emlen, 1932

= Anolis sminthus =

Species of lizard

Anolis sminthus, the mouse anole, is a species of lizard in the family Dactyloidae. It lives in Honduras, Nicaragua and El Salvador.
