= Abronia chiszari =

Conservation status
- Endangered (IUCN 3.1)
- CITES Appendix II

Scientific classification
- Kingdom: Animalia
- Phylum: Chordata
- Class: Reptilia
- Order: Squamata
- Suborder: Anguimorpha
- Family: Anguidae
- Genus: Abronia
- Species: A. chiszari

Binomial name
- Abronia chiszari H.M. Smith & R.B. Smith, 1981
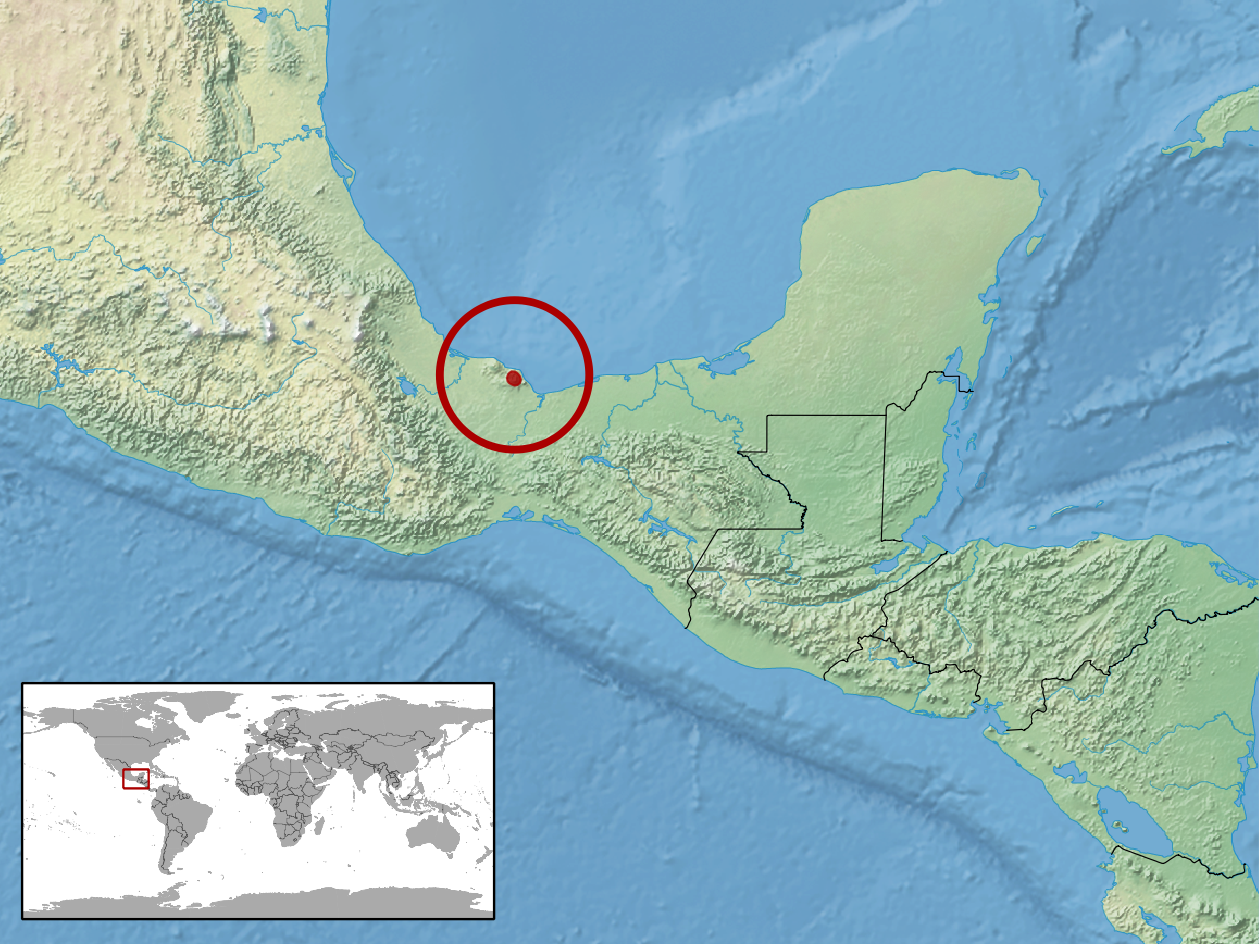

Synonyms
- Abronia chiszari H.M. Smith & R.B. Smith, 1981; Abronia (Scopaeabronia) chiszari — Campbell & Frost, 1993; Abronia chiszari — Liner, 1994

Species of lizard

Abronia chiszari, Chiszar's arboreal alligator lizard, is an endangered species of arboreal alligator lizard in the family Anguidae. The species is native to east-central Mexico.

== Taxonomy ==
A. chiszari was described in 1981 by Hobart Muir Smith and Rozella Blood Smith, his wife.

== Etymology ==
The specific name, chiszari, is in honor of American herpetologist David Chiszar.

== Geographic range ==
A. chiszari is only found on the slopes of Volcano Santa Marta, in the Sierra de los Tuxtlas, Veracruz, Mexico, between elevations of 360 to 800 m (1,180 to 2,620 ft).

== Habitat ==
The preferred natural habitat of A. chiszar is forest.

== Reproduction ==
A. chiszari is viviparous.
