= Celatiscincus similis =

Conservation status
- Endangered (IUCN 3.1)

Scientific classification
- Kingdom: Animalia
- Phylum: Chordata
- Class: Reptilia
- Order: Squamata
- Family: Scincidae
- Genus: Celatiscincus
- Species: C. similis

Binomial name
- Celatiscincus similis Sadlier, Smith, & Bauer, 2006
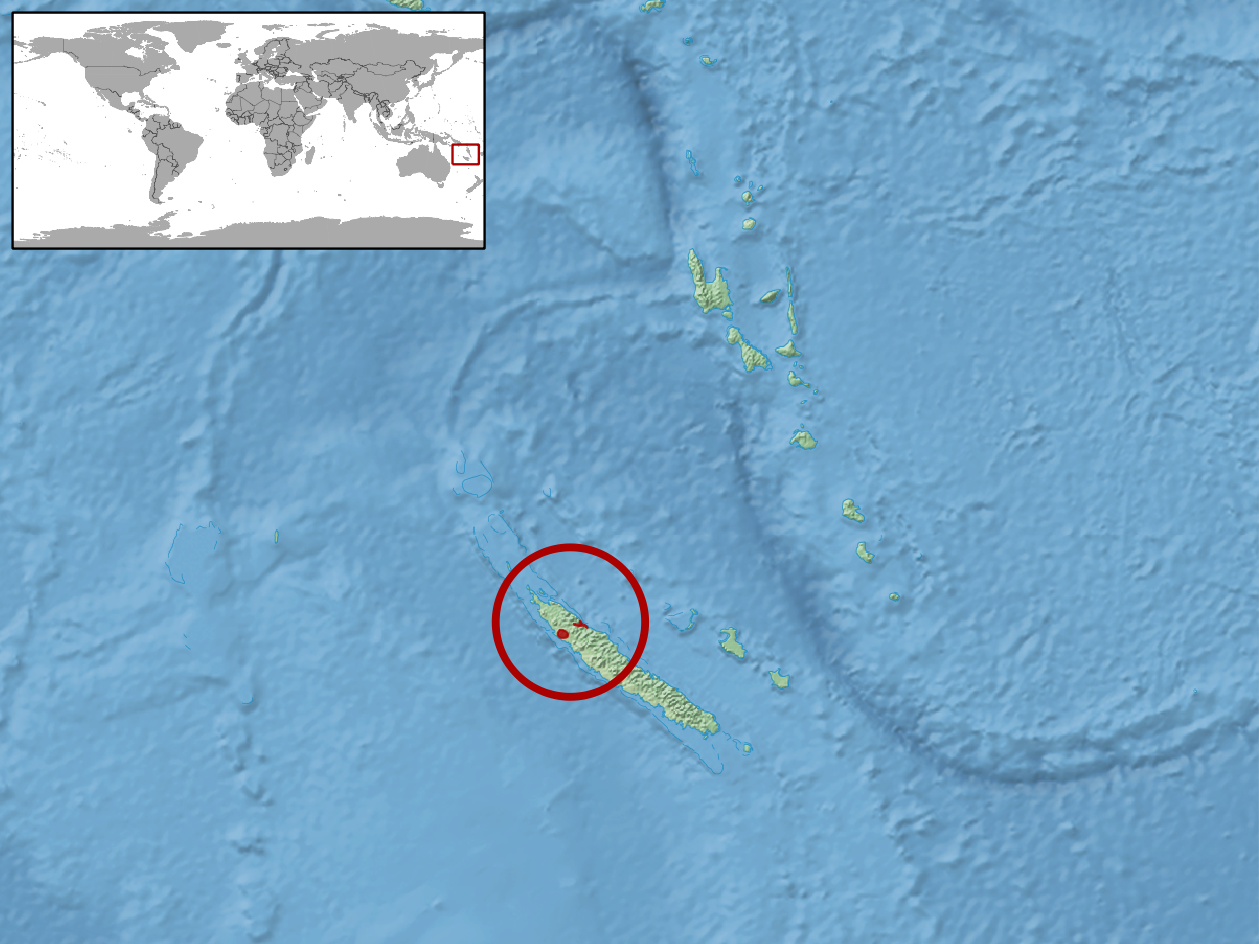

Species of lizard

Celatiscincus similis, the northern pale-hipped skink, is a species of lizard in the family Scincidae. It is endemic to New Caledonia.
