= Thermophis zhaoermii =

Conservation status
- Endangered (IUCN 3.1)

Scientific classification
- Kingdom: Animalia
- Phylum: Chordata
- Class: Reptilia
- Order: Squamata
- Suborder: Serpentes
- Family: Colubridae
- Genus: Thermophis
- Species: T. zhaoermii

Binomial name
- Thermophis zhaoermii Guo, Liu, Feng, & He, 2008

Species of snake

Thermophis zhaoermii, the Sichuan hot-spring keelback, is a species of snake in the family, Colubridae. It is found in China.
