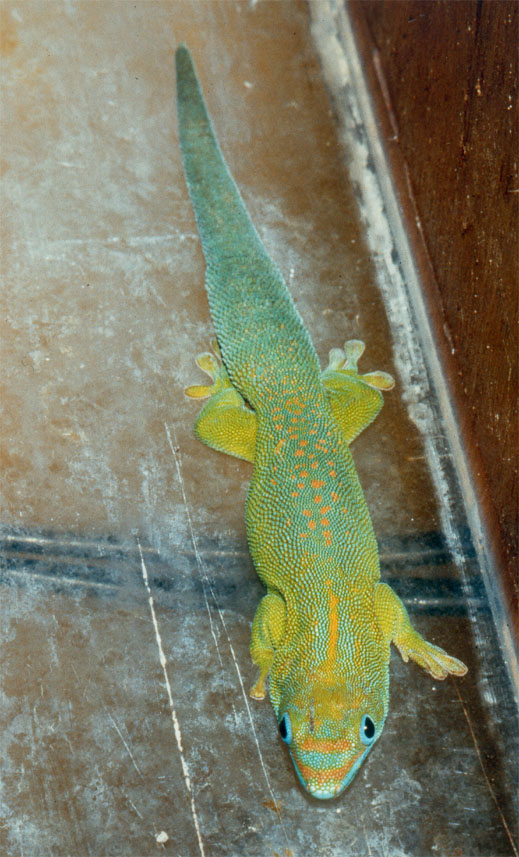

Conservation status
- Endangered (IUCN 3.1)

Scientific classification
- Kingdom: Animalia
- Phylum: Chordata
- Class: Reptilia
- Order: Squamata
- Suborder: Gekkota
- Family: Gekkonidae
- Genus: Phelsuma
- Species: P. flavigularis

Binomial name
- Phelsuma flavigularis Mertens, 1962
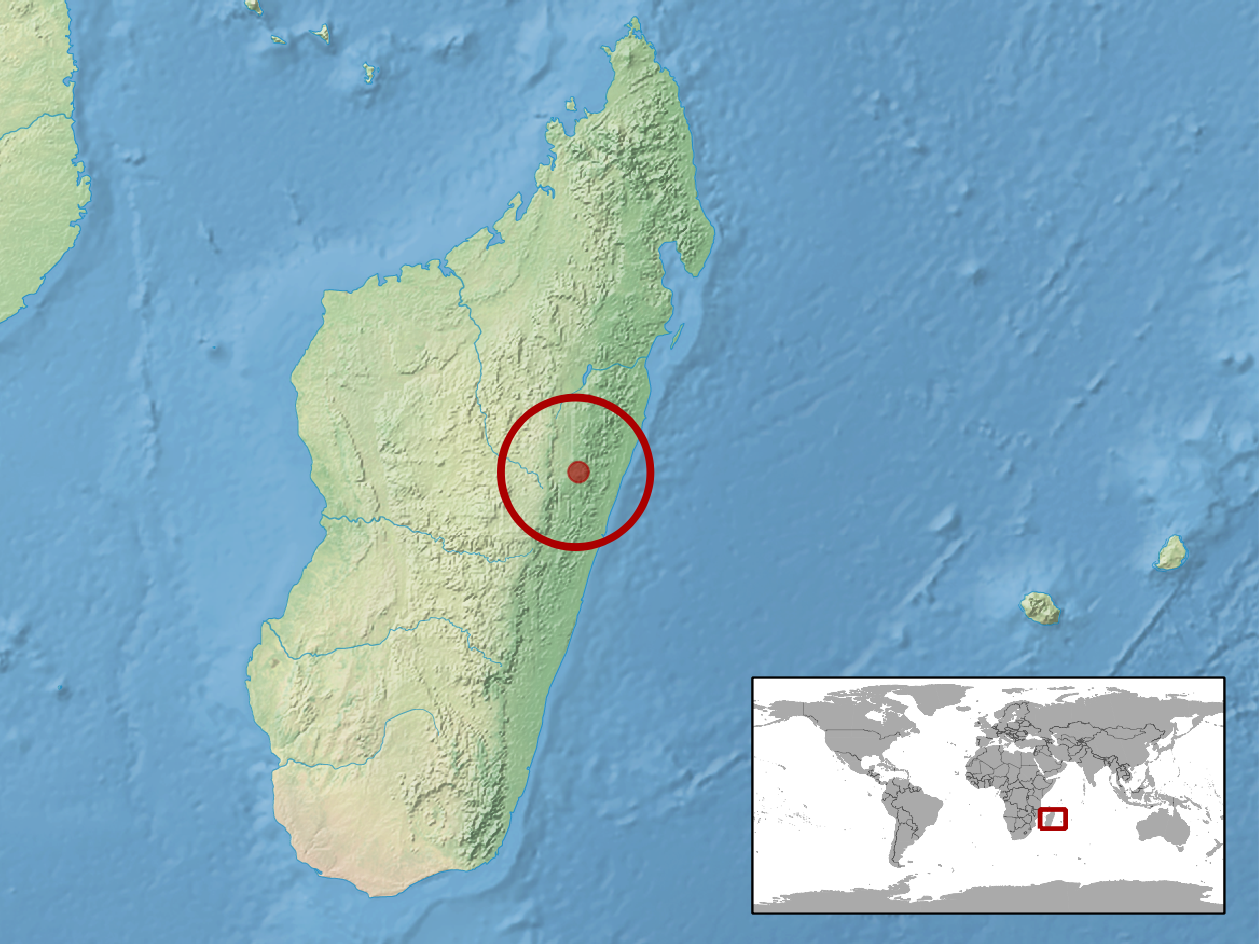

= Yellow-throated day gecko =

Species of lizard

The yellow-throated day gecko (Phelsuma flavigularis) is an endangered diurnal species of gecko from eastern Madagascar. It typically inhabits rainforests and dwells on trees. This endangered species feeds on insects and nectar.

== Description ==
This lizard belongs to the medium-sized day geckos. Males can reach a total length of about 15 cm (5.9 in) while females are often much smaller. The body colour is dark green or bluish green. On the snout there are two red transversal bars. One to three rust-coloured stripes may be present on the neck. On the back there are small brownish or reddish dots and spottings. The throat is light yellow and the ventral side is beige. P. flavigularis has blue eye rings.

== Distribution ==
This species has a limited distribution. It is only known from the area around Andasibe on the east coast of Madagascar, about 100 km (62 mi) east of Antananarivo.

== Habitat ==
P. flavigularis is found on banana trees and palms. Its original habitat are rainforests. The east coast of Madagascar has a humid and warm climate.

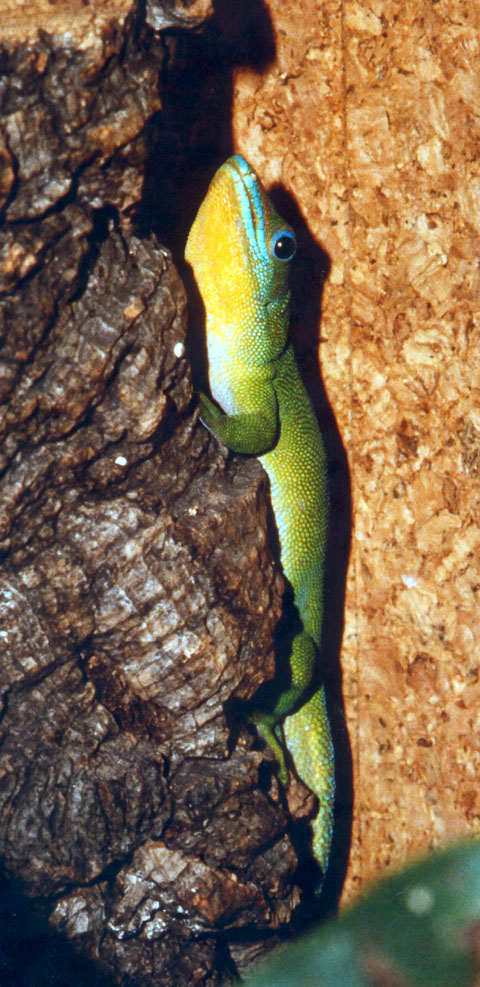
throat of species

== Diet ==
These day geckos feed on various insects and other invertebrates. They also like to lick soft, sweet fruit; pollen; and nectar.

== Behaviour ==
Like most Phelsuma spec., this species can be quite quarrelsome and do not accept other males in their neighbourhood. In captivity, where the females cannot escape, the males can also sometimes seriously wound a female during courtship. In this case, the male and female must be separated immediately.

== Care and maintenance in captivity ==
These animals should be housed in pairs and need a large, well planted terrarium. The temperature should be between 25 and 28 °C. The humidity should be maintained between 75 and 100%. In captivity, these animals can be fed with crickets, wax moths, fruit flies, mealworms, and houseflies.
