= List of vulnerable reptiles =

- Extinct in the wild (EW): 2 species
- Critically endangered (CR): 432 species
- Endangered (EN): 800 species
- Vulnerable (VU): 627 species
- Near threatened (NT, LR/cd): 566 species
- Least concern (LC): 6,406 species
- Data deficient (DD): 1,502 species
Reptile species (IUCN, 2025.2)
- 10,368 extant species have been evaluated
- 8,866 of those are fully assessed (Note: excludes data deficient evaluations.)
- 6,972 are not threatened at present
- 1,894 to 3,396 are threatened (Note: Threatened comprises CR, EN and VU. Upper estimate additionally includes DD.)
- 34 to 84 are extinct or extinct in the wild:
  - 32 extinct (EX) species (Note: Chart omits extinct (EX) species)
  - 2 extinct in the wild (EW)
  - 50 possibly extinct [CR(PE)]
  - 0 possibly extinct in the wild [CR(PEW)]

Vulnerable (VU) species are considered to be facing a high risk of extinction in the wild.

In September 2016, the International Union for Conservation of Nature (IUCN) listed 411 vulnerable reptile species. Of all evaluated reptile species, 8.0% are listed as vulnerable. The IUCN also lists ten reptile subspecies as vulnerable.

No subpopulations of reptiles have been evaluated as vulnerable by the IUCN.

For a species to be assessed as vulnerable to extinction the best available evidence must meet quantitative criteria set by the IUCN designed to reflect "a high risk of extinction in the wild". Endangered and critically endangered species also meet the quantitative criteria of vulnerable species, and are listed separately. See: List of endangered reptiles, List of critically endangered reptiles. Vulnerable, endangered and critically endangered species are collectively referred to as threatened species by the IUCN.

Additionally 910 reptile species (18% of those evaluated) are listed as data deficient, meaning there is insufficient information for a full assessment of conservation status. As these species typically have small distributions and/or populations, they are intrinsically likely to be threatened, according to the IUCN. While the category of data deficient indicates that no assessment of extinction risk has been made for the taxa, the IUCN notes that it may be appropriate to give them "the same degree of attention as threatened taxa, at least until their status can be assessed".

This is a complete list of vulnerable reptile species and subspecies evaluated by the IUCN.

== Turtles and tortoises ==
=== Chelidae ===
Austro‑South American side‑necked turtles

- Pritchard's snake-necked turtle (Chelodina pritchardi)
- White-bellied snapping turtle (Elseya branderhorsti)
- Brazilian snake-necked turtle (Hydromedusa maximiliani)
- Zulia toad-headed sideneck (Mesoclemmys zuliae)
- Williams' side-necked turtle (Phrynops williamsi)
- Fitzroy River turtle (Rheodytes leukops)

=== Pelomedusidae ===
African side‑necked turtles

- Turkana mud turtle (Pelusios broadleyi)

=== Podocnemididae ===
Malagasy‑South American side‑necked turtles

- Big-headed Amazon River turtle (Peltocephalus dumerilianus)
- Red-headed Amazon River turtle (Podocnemis erythrocephala)
- Six-tubercled Amazon River turtle (Podocnemis sextuberculata)
- Yellow-spotted river turtle (Podocnemis unifilis)

=== Trionychidae ===
Softshell turtles

- Asiatic softshell turtle (Amyda cartilaginea)
- Senegal flapshell turtle (Cyclanorbis senegalensis)
- Aubry's flapshell turtle (Cycloderma aubryi)
- Sri Lankan flapshell turtle (Lissemys ceylonensis)
- Indian flapshell turtle (Lissemys punctata)
- Southern New Guinea giant softshell turtle (Pelochelys bibroni)
- Northern New Guinea giant softshell turtle (Pelochelys signifera)
- Chinese softshell turtle (Pelodiscus sinensis)
- African softshell turtle (Trionyx triunguis)

=== Emydidae ===
Terrapins

- Western pond turtle (Actinemys marmorata)
- Yellow-blotched map turtle (Graptemys flavimaculata)
- Ringed map turtle (Graptemys oculifera)
- Diamondback terrapin (Malaclemys terrapin)
- Common box turtle (Terrapene carolina)
- Hispaniolan slider (Trachemys decorata)
- Big Bend slider (Trachemys gaigeae)
- Ornate slider (Trachemys ornata)
- Jamaican slider (Trachemys terrapen)
- Yaqui slider (Trachemys yaquia)

=== Geoemydidae ===
Box turtles, pond turtles

- Malayan flat-shelled turtle (Notochelys platynota)
- Indian roofed turtle (Pangshura tecta)
- Large-nosed wood turtle (Rhinoclemmys nasuta)
- Mexican spotted wood turtle (Rhinoclemmys rubida)

=== Testudinidae ===
Tortoises

- Volcán Wolf giant tortoise (Chelonoidis becki)
- Chaco tortoise (Chelonoidis chilensis)
- Yellow-footed tortoise (Chelonoidis denticulatus)
- Pinzón giant tortoise (Chelonoidis duncanensis)
- Volcán Alcedo giant tortoise (Chelonoidis vandenburghi)
- Nama padloper (Chersobius solus)
- Indian star tortoise (Geochelone elegans)
- Aldabra giant tortoise (Geochelone gigantea)
- Goode's thornscrub tortoise (Gopherus evgoodei)
- Sonoran Desert tortoise (Gopherus morafkai)
- Travancore tortoise (Indotestudo travancorica)
- Lobatse hinge-back tortoise (Kinixys lobatsiana)
- Natal hinge-back tortoise (Kinixys natalensis)
- Greek tortoise (Testudo graeca)
- Hermann's tortoise (Testudo hermanni)
- Central Asian tortoise (Testudo horsfieldii)

=== Cheloniidae ===
Sea turtles

- Loggerhead sea turtle (Caretta caretta)
- Olive ridley sea turtle (Lepidochelys olivacea)

=== Dermochelyidae ===
Leatherback sea turtle (monotypic)

- Leatherback sea turtle (Dermochelys coriacea)

=== Chelydridae ===
Snapping turtles

- Central American snapping turtle (Chelydra rossignonii)
- Suwannee alligator snapping turtle (Macrochelys suwanniensis)

=== Kinosternidae ===
Mud turtles, musk turtles

- Central Chiapas mud turtle (Kinosternon abaxillare)
- Central American mud turtle (Kinosternon angustipons)
- Rough-footed mud turtle (Kinosternon hirtipes)
- Sonora mud turtle (Kinosternon sonoriense)
- Mexican musk turtle (Staurotypus triporcatus)

== Crocodilia ==
- American crocodile (Crocodylus acutus)
- Mugger crocodile (Crocodylus palustris)
- Dwarf crocodile (Osteolaemus tetraspis)

== Lizards ==
There are 244 species and nine subspecies of lizard assessed as vulnerable.

=== Iguanids ===
Includes iguanas and related species

Species

- Marine iguana (Amblyrhynchus cristatus)
- Santa Fe land iguana (Conolophus pallidus)
- Galapagos land iguana (Conolophus subcristatus)
- Balsas spiny-tailed iguana (Ctenosaura clarki)
- Yucatán spiny-tailed iguana (Ctenosaura defensor)
- Nolasco spiny-tailed iguana (Ctenosaura nolascensis)
- Northern Bahamian rock iguana (Cyclura cychlura)
- Clouded rock iguana (Cyclura nubila)

Subspecies

- Isabella marine iguana (Amblyrhynchus cristatus albemarlensis)
- Amblyrhynchus cristatus cristatus
- Santa Cruz marine iguana (Amblyrhynchus cristatus hassi)
- Pinta marine iguana (Amblyrhynchus cristatus sielmanni)
- Española marine iguana (Amblyrhynchus cristatus venustissimus)
- Cuban rock iguana (Cyclura nubila nubila)

=== Anguids ===
Includes slowworms, glass lizards, and alligator lizards

- Anzuetoi arboreal alligator lizard (Abronia anzuetoi)
- Mixtecan arboreal alligator lizard (Abronia mixteca)
- Oaxaca arboreal alligator lizard (Abronia oaxacae)
- Bromeliad arboreal alligator lizard (Abronia taeniata)
- Bocourt's arboreal alligator lizard (Abronia vasconcelosii)
- Panamint alligator lizard (Elgaria panamintina)
- Ophisaurus hainanensis

=== Diploglossidae ===
Galliwasps and Ophiodes sp. legless lizards

- Bromeliad galliwasp (Celestus fowleri)
- Giant Hispaniolan galliwasp (Celestus warreni)

=== Girdled lizards ===
- Giant girdled lizard (Cordylus giganteus)
- McLachlan's girdled lizard (Cordylus mclachlani)
- Dwarf crag lizard (Cordylus nebulosus)
- Tasman's girdled lizard (Cordylus tasmani)
- Armadillo girdled lizard (Ouroborus cataphractus)
- Emperor flat lizard (Platysaurus imperator)

=== Chameleons ===
- Northern leaf chameleon (Brookesia ebenaui)
- Mount d'Ambre leaf chameleon (Brookesia tuberculata)
- Brookesia vadoni
- Calumma capuroni
- Hooded chameleon (Calumma cucullatum)
- Marojejy peak chameleon (Calumma jejy)
- O'Shaughnessy's chameleon (Calumma oshaughnessyi)
- Calumma peyrierasi
- Tsaratanana chameleon (Calumma tsaratananense)
- Blunt-nosed chameleon (Calumma tsycorne)
- Antimena chameleon (Furcifer antimena)
- Jewelled chameleon (Furcifer campani)
- Labord's chameleon (Furcifer labordi)
- Petter's chameleon (Furcifer petteri)
- Rhinoceros chameleon (Furcifer rhinoceratus)
- Mount Kenya sentinel chameleon (Kinyongia excubitor)
- Elongate leaf chameleon (Palleon nasus)
- Mahenge pygmy chameleon (Rhampholeon beraduccii)
- Marshall's pygmy chameleon (Rhampholeon marshalli)
- Mount Chiperone pygmy chameleon (Rhampholeon nebulauctor)
- Four-horned chameleon (Trioceros quadricornis)
- Trioceros serratus

=== Plated lizards ===
- Breyer's long-tailed seps (Tetradactylus breyeri)
- Tracheloptychus petersi
- Zonosaurus anelanelany
- Zonosaurus boettgeri
- Zonosaurus maximus
- Four-lined girdled lizard (Zonosaurus quadrilineatus)

=== Anoles ===
- Barker's anole
- Rueda's anole
- Foothill anole
- Hidalgo anole
- Ghost anole

=== Gekkonids ===
- Giant bronze gecko (Ailuronyx trachygaster)
- Blaesodactylus boivini
- Christinus guentheri
- Mt Elgon forest gecko (Cnemaspis elgonensis)
- Indian day gecko (Cnemaspis indica)
- Das's day gecko (Cnemaspis indraneildasii)
- Jerdon's day gecko (Cnemaspis jerdonii)
- Vellore day gecko (Cnemaspis otai)
- Niah cave gecko (Cyrtodactylus cavernicolus)
- Cyrtodactylus chrysopylos
- Moluccan bow-fingered gecko (Cyrtodactylus deveti)
- Chiku bent-toed gecko (Cyrtodactylus hidupselamanya)
- Gekko ernstkelleri
- Gigante narrow-disked gecko (Gekko gigante)
- Peking gecko (Gekko swinhonis)
- White-striped viper gecko (Hemidactylus albofasciatus)
- Hemidactylus gujaratensis
- Satara gecko (Hemidactylus sataraensis)
- Rotuma forest gecko (Lepidodactylus gardineri)
- Lepidodactylus listeri
- Viti forest gecko (Lepidodactylus manni)
- Seventy Islands gecko (Lepidodactylus paurolepis)
- Tiny scaled gecko (Lygodactylus bivittis)
- Blanc's dwarf gecko (Lygodactylus blanci)
- Usambara dwarf gecko (Lygodactylus gravis)
- Madagascar dwarf gecko (Lygodactylus madagascariensis)
- Methuen's dwarf gecko (Lygodactylus methueni)
- Matoatoa brevipes
- Lesser night gecko (Nactus coindemirensis)
- Serpent Island gecko (Nactus serpensinsula)
- Angel's petite gecko (Paragehyra petiti)
- Grandidier's Madagascar ground gecko (Paroedura androyensis)
- Paroedura vazimba
- Phelsuma breviceps
- Phelsuma hielscheri
- Island day gecko (Phelsuma nigristriata)
- Standing's day gecko (Phelsuma standingi)
- Orange-spotted smooth-scaled gecko (Pseudogekko brevipes)
- Uroplatus ebenaui
- Uroplatus giganteus
- Henkel's leaf-tailed gecko (Uroplatus henkeli)
- Uroplatus malama

=== Wall lizards ===
Species

- Acanthodactylus felicis
- Leopard fringe-fingered lizard (Acanthodactylus pardalis)
- Darevskia alpina
- Mosor rock lizard (Dinarolacerta mosorensis)
- El Hierro giant lizard (Gallotia simonyi)
- Iberian rock lizard (Iberolacerta monticola)
- Skyros wall lizard (Podarcis gaigeae)
- Podarcis levendis
- Milos wall lizard (Podarcis milensis)

Subspecies

- Zootoca vivipara pannonica

=== Skinks ===
Species

- Woodbush legless skink (Acontias rieppeli)
- Guinea lidless skink (Afroablepharus africana)
- Amphiglossus alluaudi
- Amphiglossus anosyensis
- Yellow skink (Amphiglossus ardouini)
- Amphiglossus mandokava
- Splendid skink (Amphiglossus splendidus)
- Long-legged worm-skink (Anomalopus mackayi)
- Cebu small worm skink (Brachymeles cebuensis)
- Mandjélia litter skink (Caledoniscincus terma)
- Günther's cylindrical skink (Chalcides guentheri)
- Manuel's skink (Chalcides manueli)
- Small three-toed skink (Chalcides minutus)
- Grande Comores snake eyed skink (Cryptoblepharus ater)
- Glorioso snake eyed skink (Cryptoblepharus gloriosus)
- Lancelin Island skink (Ctenotus lancelini)
- Hamelin ctenotus (Ctenotus zastictus)
- Griffin's keel-scaled tree skink (Dasia griffini)
- Erronan treeskink (Emoia erronan)
- Loyalty Islands emoia (Emoia loyaltiensis)
- Viti copper-headed skink (Emoia parkeri)
- Emoia tuitarere
- Gracile burrowing skink (Graciliscincus shonae)
- Kaestlea laterimaculata
- New Caledonian leopard skink (Lacertoides pardalis)
- Telfair's skink (Leiolopisma telfairii)
- Ruwenzori four toed skink (Leptosiaphos meleagris)
- Great desert skink (Liopholis kintorei)
- Ashwamedh writhing skink (Lygosoma ashwamedhi)
- Madascincus nanus
- Marmorosphax boulinda
- Montane marble-throated skink (Marmorosphax montana)
- Gracile dwarf skink (Nannoscincus gracilis)
- Earless dwarf skink (Nannoscincus mariei)
- Rankin's dwarf skink (Nannoscincus rankini)
- Florida sand skink (Neoseps reynoldsi)
- Pedra Branca skink (Niveoscincus palfreymani)
- Robust skink (Oligosoma alani)
- Falla's skink (Oligosoma fallai)
- Grand skink (Oligosoma grande)
- Chevron skink (Oligosoma homalonotum)
- Lord Howe Island skink (Oligosoma lichenigera)
- Macgregor's skink (Oligosoma macgregori)
- Small-scaled skink (Oligosoma microlepis)
- New Zealand striped skink (Oligosoma striatum)
- Scree skink (Oligosoma waimatense)
- Whitaker's skink (Oligosoma whitakeri)
- Paracontias kankana
- Parvoscincus palawanensis
- Parvoscincus sisoni
- Duges' skink (Plestiodon dugesii)
- Pseudoacontias unicolor
- Günther's dwarf burrowing skink (Scelotes guentheri)
- Kasner's dwarf burrowing skink (Scelotes kasneri)
- Red-tailed shiny skink (Sigaloseps ruficauda)
- Orange-bellied burrowing skink (Simiscincus aurantiacus)
- Sphenomorphus knollmanae
- Trachylepis dumasi
- Trachylepis lavarambo
- Trachylepis loluiensis
- Trachylepis tavaratra
- Wright's skink (Trachylepis wrightii)
- Aubrey's whiptailed skink (Tropidoscincus aubrianus)
- Lomi's blind legless skink (Typhlosaurus lomiae)

Subspecies

- Egernia stokesii aethiops
- Jurien Bay rock-skink (Liopholis pulchra longicauda)

=== Spectacled lizards ===
- Bresslau's bachia (Bachia bresslaui)
- Psilophthalmus paeminosus
- Shiny lightbulb lizard (Riama laevis)
- Riama stigmatoral
- Key tegu (Teuchocercus keyi)

=== Teiids ===
Includes whiptails and tegus

- Aspidoscelis catalinensis
- Baja California whiptail (Aspidoscelis labialis)
- San Pedro Martir whiptail (Aspidoscelis martyris)
- Contomastix vacariensis
- Contomastix vittata

=== Dragon lizards ===
- Montane rock agama (Agama montana)
- Yinnietharra rock dragon (Ctenophorus yinnietharra)
- Weber’s sailfin lizard (Hydrosaurus weberi)
- Agaupani mountain lizard (Japalura dasi)
- Hump snout lizard (Lyriocephalus scutatus)
- Persian toad agama (Phrynocephalus persicus)
- Strauch's toad agama (Phrynocephalus strauchi)
- Savigny's agama (Trapelus savignii)
- Grassland earless dragon (Tympanocryptis pinguicolla)
- Egyptian mastigure (Uromastyx aegyptia)
- Omani spiny-tailed lizard (Uromastyx thomasi)

=== Phyllodactylids ===
- Mountain leaf-toed gecko (Asaccus montanus)
- Belize leaf-toed gecko (Phyllodactylus insularis)
- Western leaf-toed gecko (Phyllodactylus lepidopygus)
- Boavista wall gecko (Tarentola boavistensis)
- Helmeted gecko (Tarentola chazaliae)

=== Phrynosomatids ===
- Dunes sagebrush lizard (Sceloporus arenicolus)
- Sceloporus maculosus
- Sceloporus megalepidurus
- Sceloporus oberon
- Urosaurus clarionensis
- Uta encantadae
- Uta lowei
- Uta palmeri
- Uta tumidarostra

=== Liolaemids ===
- Ctenoblepharys adspersa
- Liolaemus dicktracyi
- Liolaemus famatinae
- Hellmich's tree iguana (Liolaemus hellmichi)
- Liolaemus lutzae
- Liolaemus morenoi
- Liolaemus occipitalis
- Liolaemus tandiliensis
- Thorntail mountain lizard (Phymaturus mallimaccii)

=== Other lizard species ===
- Wiegmann's tree lizard (Anisolepis undulatus)
- Hermite Island worm-lizard (Aprasia rostrata)
- Strand bavayia (Bavayia crassicollis)
- Reticulated collared lizard (Crotaphytus reticulatus)
- Los archipelago worm lizard (Cynisca leonina)
- Cynisca nigeriensis
- Red-eyed woodlizard (Enyalioides oshaughnessyi)
- Stephen's Island gecko (Hoplodactylus stephensi)
- East Plana curlytail (Leiocephalus greenwayi)
- Gaige's tropical night lizard (Lepidophyma gaigeae)
- Cave tropical night lizard (Lepidophyma micropholis)
- Ringed spinytail iguana (Morunasaurus annularis)
- Peruvian bush anole (Polychrus peruvianus)
- Bavay's giant gecko (Rhacodactylus chahoua)
- Crested gecko (Rhacodactylus ciliatus)
- Sarasin's giant gecko (Rhacodactylus sarasinorum)
- Banded-toed gecko (Saurodactylus fasciatus)
- Rough-banded sphaero (Sphaerodactylus callocricus)
- Grenadines sphaero (Sphaerodactylus kirbyi)
- Cuban broad-banded sphaero (Sphaerodactylus torrei)
- Peracca's whorltail iguana (Stenocercus festae)
- Stenocercus torquatus
- Tropidurus erythrocephalus
- Giant spike-tailed agama (Uromastyx aegyptia)
- Gray's monitor (Varanus olivaceus)
- Sandstone night lizard (Xantusia gracilis)
- Xenosaurus grandis
- Rhacodactylus trachyrhynchus

== Snakes ==
There are 100 species and one subspecies of snake assessed as vulnerable.

=== Pseudoxyrhophiids ===
- Brygophis coulangesi
- Uluguru forest snake (Buhoma procterae)
- Compsophis zeny
- Liophidium therezieni
- Grandidier's water snake (Liopholidophis grandidieri)
- Lycodryas citrinus
- Lycodryas inornatus
- Madagascar burrowing snake (Pararhadinaea melanogaster)
- Pseudoxyrhopus oblectator
- Pseudoxyrhopus sokosoko
- Yellow-striped water snake (Thamnosophis stumpffi)

=== Vipers ===
Species

- Barbour's short-headed viper (Atheris barbouri)
- Usambara eyelash viper (Atheris ceratophora)
- Plain mountain adder (Bitis inornata)
- Namaqua dwarf adder (Bitis schneideri)
- Yellow-blotched palm pit viper (Bothriechis aurifer)
- Rowley's palm pit viper (Bothriechis rowleyi)
- Piraja's lancehead (Bothrops pirajai)
- Crotalus stejnegeri
- Hon Son pit viper (Cryptelytrops honsonensis)
- Ruby-eyed green pitviper (Cryptelytrops rubeus)
- Shedao Island pit viper (Gloydius shedaoensis)
- Montivipera albicornuta
- Ophryacus undulatus
- Cameron highlands pit viper (Popeia nebularis)
- Asp viper (Vipera aspis)
- Caucasus subalpine viper (Vipera dinniki)
- Iranian mountain steppe viper (Vipera ebneri)
- Alburzi viper (Vipera eriwanensis)
- Lataste's viper (Vipera latastei)
- Meadow viper (Vipera ursinii)

Subspecies

- Atlantic bushmaster (Lachesis muta rhombeata)

=== Dipsadids ===
- Stuart's burrowing snake (Adelphicos veraepacis)
- Modest ground snake (Atractus modestus)
- Northern ground snake (Atractus nicefori)
- Roule's ground snake (Atractus roulei)
- Peters' running snake (Coniophanes dromiciformis)
- Dixon's ground snake (Erythrolamprus atraventer)
- Geophis juliai
- Geophis nephodrymus
- Southern hognose snake (Heterodon simus)
- Omoadiphas aurula
- Philodryas livida
- Ribbon graceful brown snake (Rhadinaea fulvivittis)
- Monte Cristi graceful brown snake (Rhadinella montecristi)
- Rhadinella pegosalyta
- Tantalophis discolor

=== Elapids ===
- South Andaman krait
- Red River krait
- Ornamental snake
- Lake Cronin snake
- Dunmall's snake
- Broad-headed snake
- Lake Taal snake
- Crocker's sea snake
- Katuali
- Solomons black-banded krait
- Oaxacan coral snake
- Chinese cobra
- Mandalay spitting cobra
- Indochinese spitting cobra
- King cobra
- Woodlark Island forest snake

=== Colubrids ===
- Dryocalamus philippinus
- Philippine dryophiops (Dryophiops philippina)
- Cloud forest parrot snake (Leptophis modestus)
- Rendahl's wolf snake (Lycodon paucifasciatus)
- Short-tailed kukri snake (Oligodon brevicauda)
- Walnut kukri snake (Oligodon juglandifer)
- Lacroix kukri snake (Oligodon lacroixi)
- Spotted-bellied short-headed snake (Oligodon modestum)
- Oligodon pulcherrimus
- Moellendorff's trinket snake (Orthriophis moellendorfi)
- Tantilla boipiranga
- Jan's centipede snake (Tantilla jani)
- Tantilla psittaca
- Fruhstorfer's mountain snake (Tetralepis fruhstorferi)
- Usambara vine snake (Thelotornis usambaricus)

=== Keelbacks ===
- Adelophis copei
- Maki's keelback (Hebius miyajimae)
- Large-headed water snake (Natrix megalocephala)
- Storeria hidalgoensis
- Giant garter snake (Thamnophis gigas)
- Thamnophis scaliger

=== Other snake species ===
- Hainan odd-scaled snake (Achalinus hainanensis)
- Amami Takachiho snake (Achalinus werneri)
- Stadelman's worm snake (Amerotyphlops stadelmani)
- Amerotyphlops tycherus
- Round Island boa (Casarea dussumieri)
- Jamaican boa (Chilabothrus subflavus)
- Longhead water snake (Enhydris longicauda)
- Oaxacan dwarf boa (Exiliboa placata)
- Dwarf wolf snake (Lycophidion nanus)
- Two-lined black earth snake (Melanophidium bilineatum)
- Mcnamara's burrowing snake (Pseudorabdion mcnamarae)
- Panay Island reed snake (Pseudorabdion talonuran)
- Burmese python (Python bivittatus)
- Myanmar short-tailed python (Python kyaiktiyo)
- Christmas Island blind snake (Ramphotyphlops exocoeti)
- Phipson's earth snake (Uropeltis phipsonii)

== See also ==
- Lists of IUCN Red List vulnerable species
- List of least concern reptiles
- List of near threatened reptiles
- List of endangered reptiles
- List of critically endangered reptiles
- List of recently extinct reptiles
- List of data deficient reptiles
