= Contomastix leachei =

Conservation status
- Data Deficient (IUCN 3.1)

Scientific classification
- Kingdom: Animalia
- Phylum: Chordata
- Class: Reptilia
- Order: Squamata
- Family: Teiidae
- Genus: Contomastix
- Species: C. leachei

Binomial name
- Contomastix leachei (Peracca, 1897)

Synonyms
- Cnemidophorus leachei Peracca, 1897

Species of lizard

Contomastix leachei is a species of lizard in the family Teiidae. The species is endemic to Argentina.

== Etymology ==
The specific name, leachei, is in honor of Argentinian landowner Don Francisco Leache who was the kind host of Italian ornithologist Alfredo Borelli, who collected the holotype.

== Geographic range ==
C. leachei is found in northwestern Argentina, in the provinces of Jujuy and Salta.

== Habitat ==
The preferred natural habitat of C. leachei is forest.

== Reproduction ==
C. leachei is oviparous.

== Taxonomy ==
C. leachei is a member of the C. lacertoides species group.
