= Boulenger's tree skink =

There are two species of skink named Boulenger's tree skink:

- Dasia subcaerulea
- Brachyseps frontoparietalis
