= Contomastix serrana =

Scientific classification
- Domain: Eukaryota
- Kingdom: Animalia
- Phylum: Chordata
- Class: Reptilia
- Order: Squamata
- Family: Teiidae
- Genus: Contomastix
- Species: C. serrana

Binomial name
- Contomastix serrana (Cei & Martori, 1991)

Species of lizard

Contomastix serrana is a species of teiid lizard endemic to Argentina.
