= Andinosaura crypta =

Conservation status
- Endangered (IUCN 3.1)

Scientific classification
- Kingdom: Animalia
- Phylum: Chordata
- Class: Reptilia
- Order: Squamata
- Family: Gymnophthalmidae
- Genus: Andinosaura
- Species: A. crypta

Binomial name
- Andinosaura crypta (Sánchez-Pacheco, Kirizian, & Sales-Nunes, 2011)

Synonyms
- Riama crypta

Species of lizard

Andinosaura crypta is a species of lizard in the family Gymnophthalmidae. It is endemic to Ecuador.
