= Andinosaura afrania =

Conservation status
- Data Deficient (IUCN 3.1)

Scientific classification
- Kingdom: Animalia
- Phylum: Chordata
- Class: Reptilia
- Order: Squamata
- Family: Gymnophthalmidae
- Genus: Andinosaura
- Species: A. afrania

Binomial name
- Andinosaura afrania (Arredondo & Sánchez-Pacheco, 2010)

Synonyms
- Riama afrania

Species of lizard

Andinosaura afrania is a species of lizard in the family Gymnophthalmidae. It is endemic to Colombia.
