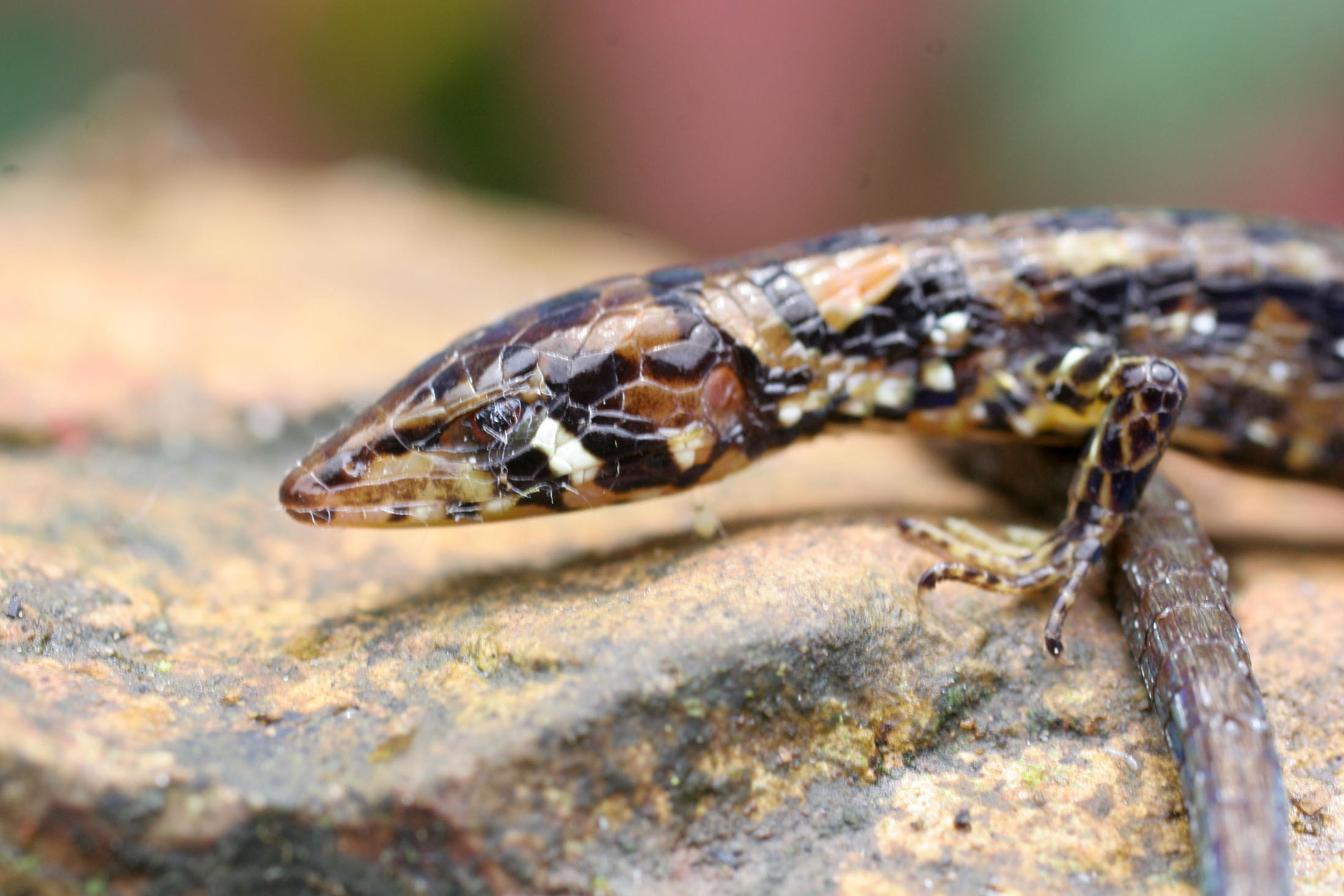

Conservation status
- Endangered (IUCN 3.1)

Scientific classification
- Kingdom: Animalia
- Phylum: Chordata
- Class: Reptilia
- Order: Squamata
- Family: Gymnophthalmidae
- Genus: Andinosaura
- Species: A. oculata

Binomial name
- Andinosaura oculata (O'Shaughnessy, 1879)

Synonyms
- Synonymy: Ecpleopus oculatus; Oreosaurus oculatus; Proctoporus oculatus; Riama oculata

= Andinosaura oculata =

Species of lizard

Andinosaura oculata, the tropical lightbulb lizard, is a species of lizard in the family Gymnophthalmidae. It is endemic to northwestern Ecuador, and can be found on the forest floor between 1432 and 2180 meters in elevation (4698 and 7152 feet). It is also referred as the Ocellated Andean-Lizard, Lagaratija andina ocelada and formally as the Riama oculata.

== Description ==
The A. oculata gets its name from the series of black and white ocelli that males have along their sides. Males are also typically reddish, while females are more brown and do not have ocelli. Both males and females differ from other lizards in the area as they have limbs that overlap when they are pressed against the body.

== Distribution ==
The A. oculata is endemic to northwestern Ecuador, on the Pacific facing slopes of the Andes. They are typically seen in high altitude forests, from cloud forests, old-growth forests, to moderatly diturbed forests and sugarcane plantations between 1432-2180 m (4698-7152 ft) in elevation. They live in an area that is roughly 5, 463 km^{2}.

== Behavior ==
The A. oculata is cryptozoic, meaning they prefer darker, moist habits. They are also shy, and will hide in leaf litter when threatened. While they spend most of their time on the ground, they are able to climb tree roots and trunks with their prehensile tails. Males may fight over territory by biting or pushing each other. Females lay egg clutches in holes dug in the ground. These clutches range from 1 to 3 eggs.

== Predators ==
Both adults and eggs are eaten by various snake species. Andean pygmy owls have also been observed preying on adults. To escape capture, the A. oculata may bight or shed its tail.

== Etymology ==
Andinosaura (andino and sauria) refers to the distribution of the lizards in this genus. The specific epithet, oculata, derives from the Latin word oculus and suffix -atus, and means "adorned with eyes". This refers to the ocelli along their bodies.

== Threats ==
The A. oculata has been listed as endangered since 2014. This is mainly due to habitat loss through development, agriculture, as well as logging and mining operations. Even though more populations have been found in recent years, they are still under threat of extinction.
