= Contomastix celata =

Scientific classification
- Domain: Eukaryota
- Kingdom: Animalia
- Phylum: Chordata
- Class: Reptilia
- Order: Squamata
- Family: Teiidae
- Genus: Contomastix
- Species: C. celata

Binomial name
- Contomastix celata Cabrera, Carreira, Di Pietro, & Rivera, 2019

Species of lizard

Contomastix celata is a species of teiid lizard endemic to Argentina.
