= Brachyseps spilostichus =

Conservation status
- Data Deficient (IUCN 3.1)

Scientific classification
- Domain: Eukaryota
- Kingdom: Animalia
- Phylum: Chordata
- Class: Reptilia
- Order: Squamata
- Family: Scincidae
- Genus: Brachyseps
- Species: B. spilostichus

Binomial name
- Brachyseps spilostichus Andreone & Greer, 2002

Synonyms
- Amphiglossus spilostichus

Species of lizard

Brachyseps spilostichus is a species of skink endemic to Madagascar.
