= Andinosaura vieta =

Conservation status
- Data Deficient (IUCN 3.1)

Scientific classification
- Kingdom: Animalia
- Phylum: Chordata
- Class: Reptilia
- Order: Squamata
- Family: Gymnophthalmidae
- Genus: Andinosaura
- Species: A. vieta

Binomial name
- Andinosaura vieta (Kirizian, 1996)

Synonyms
- Riama vieta

Species of lizard

Andinosaura vieta is a species of lizard in the family Gymnophthalmidae. It is endemic to Ecuador.
