= Anders Gunnar Johannes Rhodin =

American orthopedic surgeon, turtle researcher and conservationist

Anders G. J. Rhodin
- Born: Anders Gunnar Johannes Rhodin; December 11, 1949 (age 76); Stockholm, Sweden
- Occupations: Orthopedic surgeon, testudologist and conservationist
- Known for: Turtle research and conservation
- Spouse: Carol Conroy
- Scientific career
- Fields: Orthopedic surgery, herpetology, turtle taxonomy and conservation biology

Anders Gunnar Johannes Rhodin (born December 11, 1949), usually cited as Anders G. J. Rhodin, is Swedish-born American orthopedic surgeon, turtle researcher (testudologist), and conservationist.

== Biography ==
Rhodin is the son of the physician and biologist Johannes Arne Gosta Rhodin (1922–2004). He was born in Sweden and emigrated to the United States in January 1958 at the age of eight. In 1971, he received a bachelor's degree from Dartmouth College in Hanover, New Hampshire. While there, the herpetologist and mammalogist Russell Mittermeier was his roommate. In the same year, the two travelled together to the Amazon basin in search of monkeys and turtles. During a canoe trip with Mittermeier into the wilderness along the Rio Negro, Rhodin was given a small tortoise by an Indigenous family as a pet, an event that helped shape his subsequent scientific and professional career. His interest in caring for the animal grew, as did his desire to learn as much as possible about turtles. He began his medical studies at the University of Gothenburg in Sweden, continued them at New York Medical College, and received his M.D. from the University of Michigan in 1977.

Rhodin completed his specialist training in orthopedic surgery at Yale University, where he also conducted comparative anatomical studies of marine mammals and turtles under the mentorship of John A. Ogden. During his time at Yale, he made the significant discovery that leatherback sea turtles possess thick, highly vascularized cartilage, an unusual and important finding that he and his colleagues published in Nature in 1981. He also contributed anatomical and histological evidence for mammal-like rapid bone growth in leatherback turtles and fossil sea turtles, including electron-microscopy research on their cartilage canals carried out with his father.

After completing his medical training, Rhodin worked for several months in a hospital in the highlands of Papua New Guinea. The work not only fulfilled part of his medical training requirements but also gave him access to the turtle fauna of New Guinea. From 1982 to 2019, he worked in private practice and at Heywood Hospital in Lunenburg, Massachusetts, specializing in numerous areas of orthopedic practice, including arthroscopy, fractures and carpal tunnel syndrome. He subsequently retired and has lived with his wife, Carol Conroy, in Vermont.

Since 1972, Rhodin has devoted himself to turtle research, initially at the Museum of Comparative Zoology at Harvard University, where, under the informal mentorship of Ernest Edward Williams, he continued his collaboration with Russell Mittermeier. Taxonomic work on side-necked turtles eventually led to the description of four additional new taxa from Rote Island, East Timor and South America. He has authored or co-authored more than 300 scientific publications and has described several new turtle species, including three with Mittermeier. These include Acanthochelys macrocephala (Rhodin, Mittermeier & McMorris, 1984), Chelodina mccordi (Rhodin, 1994), Chelodina parkeri (Rhodin & Mittermeier, 1976), Chelodina pritchardi (Rhodin, 1994), and Phrynops williamsi (Rhodin & Mittermeier, 1983).

For several years, Rhodin participated actively in research on nesting and migrating leatherback sea turtles on Culebra, Puerto Rico, collaborating with Molly Lutcavage. He applied modern orthopedic surgical techniques to the development of experimental methods for attaching satellite transmitters to turtle shells.

In 1992, Rhodin founded the Chelonian Research Foundation (CRF), a philanthropic nonprofit organization focused on promoting, publishing and supporting turtle research worldwide. He is also the founding editor and publisher of Chelonian Conservation and Biology (CCB), a peer-reviewed journal established in 1993 and devoted exclusively to turtles and tortoises; Chelonian Research Monographs (CRM), a book series established in 1996 focusing on turtle and tortoise research and conservation; the loose-leaf series Conservation Biology of Freshwater Turtles and Tortoises (CBFTT); and the Turtle and Tortoise Newsletter (TTN), published from 2000 to 2011.

More recently, Rhodin has been the lead author of the annual Checklist of Turtles, produced by the Turtle Taxonomy Working Group. The checklist provides a shared reference framework for turtle research and contributes to the standardization of turtle nomenclature and taxonomy.

Through the CRF, Rhodin established the Linnaeus Fund, named after Carl Linnaeus, to provide direct support for turtle research and conservation. Over a 20-year period, the fund supported more than 118 projects worldwide with total funding exceeding US$140,000.

Since 2017, CCB and CRM have been jointly published with the Turtle Conservancy. Rhodin served as co-chairman and chairman of the IUCN Tortoise and Freshwater Turtle Specialist Group (TFTSG) between 2000 and 2012 and subsequently became its deputy chairman.

In 2012, Rhodin received the Sir Peter Scott Award for Conservation Merit from the IUCN Species Survival Commission (SSC), as well as the Behler Turtle Conservation Award from the Turtle Survival Alliance and the TFTSG. He has served as chairman of the board of the Turtle Conservancy, founding co-chairman of the Turtle Conservation Fund, the Turtle Taxonomy Fund and the Congdon-Dickson Turtle Ecology Fund, and as a founding member of the board of the Turtle Survival Alliance and the African Aquatic Conservation Fund.

Rhodin has devoted much of his time to work within the worldwide turtle conservation community, encompassing marine, terrestrial and freshwater species. He was a long-standing member of the IUCN/SSC Marine Turtle Specialist Group and a board member of the International Sea Turtle Society. In 1981, he was among the founding members of the IUCN/SSC Freshwater Chelonian Specialist Group and served as its deputy chairman from 1991 to 2000, co-chairman from 2000 to 2005, and chairman of the Tortoise and Freshwater Turtle Specialist Group from 2005 to 2012.

He was closely involved in the establishment of the Turtle Survival Alliance (TSA) in 2001 and the Turtle Conservation Fund (TCF) in 2002 and has continued to serve on the boards of both organizations. He has also been a member of the chairman's advisory council of Conservation International and a member of the board of the Turtle Conservancy.

Rhodin has served on a variety of steering and advisory bodies associated with the IUCN and CITES, including steering and Red List committees of the Species Survival Commission and the advisory board of the Mohamed bin Zayed Species Conservation Fund.

In February 2012, Rhodin was honored by the IUCN Species Survival Commission with the Sir Peter Scott Award for Conservation Merit in recognition of his long-standing contributions to turtle and tortoise conservation.

In October 2025, the Catalan publisher Lynx Edicions announced the seven-volume book project Handbook of the Reptiles of the World, for which Mittermeier and Rhodin were announced as lead editors, with publication planned for 2026.

== Eponym ==
In 2015, Australian herpetologist Scott A. Thomson named the freshwater turtle Elseya rhodini from Papua New Guinea in honor of Anders G. J. Rhodin.
