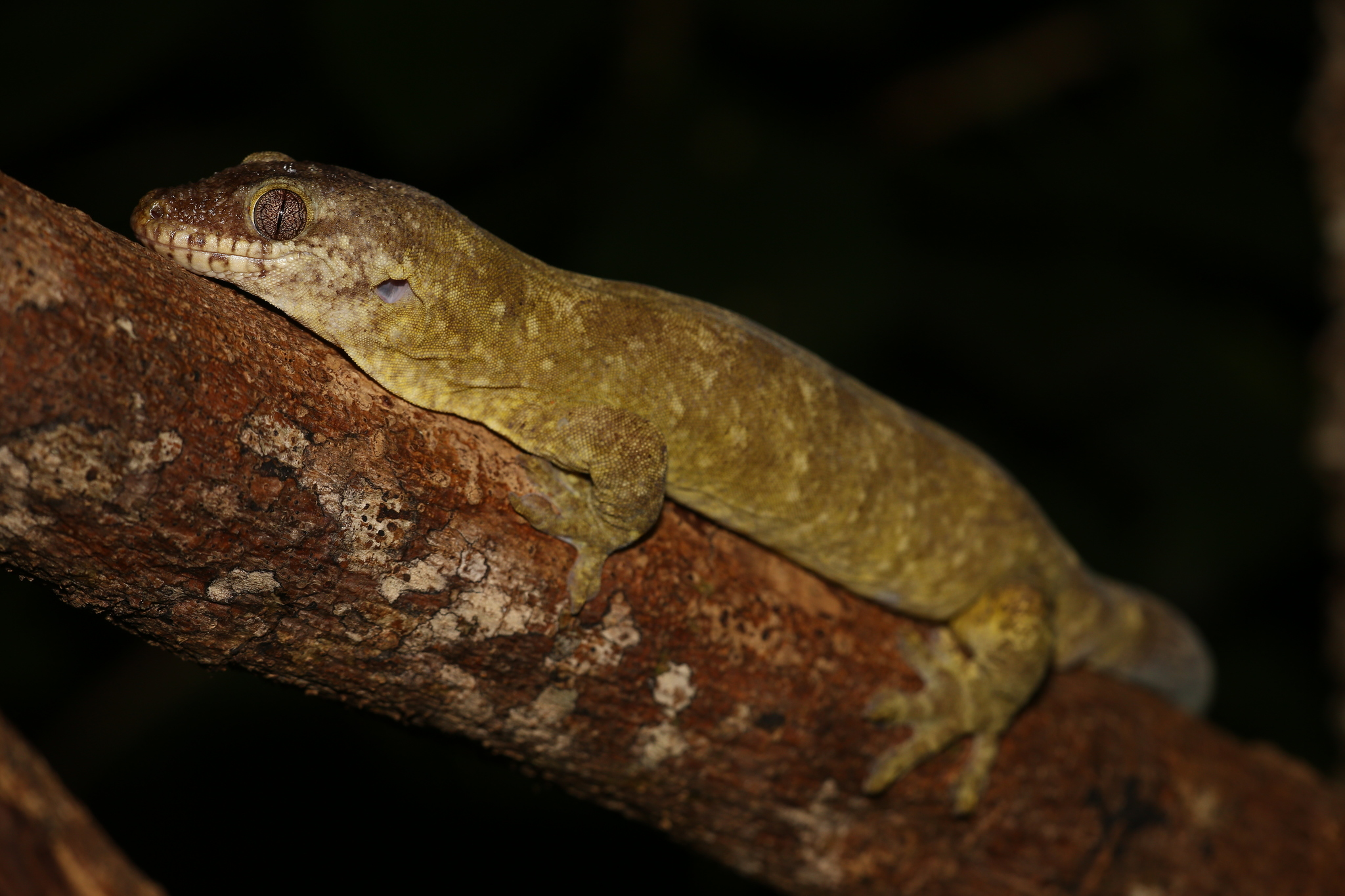

Conservation status
- Critically Endangered (IUCN 3.1)

Scientific classification
- Kingdom: Animalia
- Phylum: Chordata
- Class: Reptilia
- Order: Squamata
- Suborder: Gekkota
- Family: Diplodactylidae
- Genus: Rhacodactylus
- Species: R. trachycephalus

Binomial name
- Rhacodactylus trachycephalus Boulenger, 1878
- Approximate distribution (Isle of Pines, New Caledonia, Oceania) Range

Synonyms
- Chameleonurus trachycephalus Boulenger, 1878; Rhacodactylus trachyrhynchus trachycephalus Myers, 2005; Rhacodactylus trachyrhynchus trachycephalus Kaverkin, 2009; Rhacodactylus trachycephalus Bauer, 2012

= Rhacodactylus trachycephalus =

Species of lizard

Rhacodactylus trachycephalus, commonly known as the lesser rough-snouted giant gecko, dwarf rough-snouted giant gecko, or tough-snouted giant gecko, is a species of gecko endemic to two small areas of islands in New Caledonia. Its body grows to around 10 centimetres (3.9 in) and has a mosaic pattern with a variety of colors. Rhacodactylus trachyrhynchus is a closely related species, but R. trachycephalus is smaller and has a number of other noticeable differences. R. trachycephalus is viviparous, giving birth to only one or two young a year. Its restricted humid forest habitat is vulnerable due to multiple threats. As a result of habitat reduction, low reproduction rate and small population, it is one of the rarest geckos in the world.

== Description ==
R. trachycephalus has a body length of around 10 centimetres (3.9 in) and a snout-to-vent length of no more than 14 centimetres (5.5 in), with its tail being roughly the same length as its body. The species' scales create a mosaic pattern, with patches of white, brown, grey, and green in various hues. Its toes are somewhat broad and it has a tail exhibiting prehensility.

R. trachycephalus is closely related to Rhacodactylus trachyrhynchus, but has a number of noticeable differences. In particular, R. trachycephalus's body size is smaller than that of R. trachyrhynchus and it has larger eyes. In addition, R. trachycephalus has fewer scale rows on its midbody, as well as fewer scales in the area in between its eyes and nostrils; the scales that are in the eye-nostril area are also smaller than those on R. trachyrhynchus.

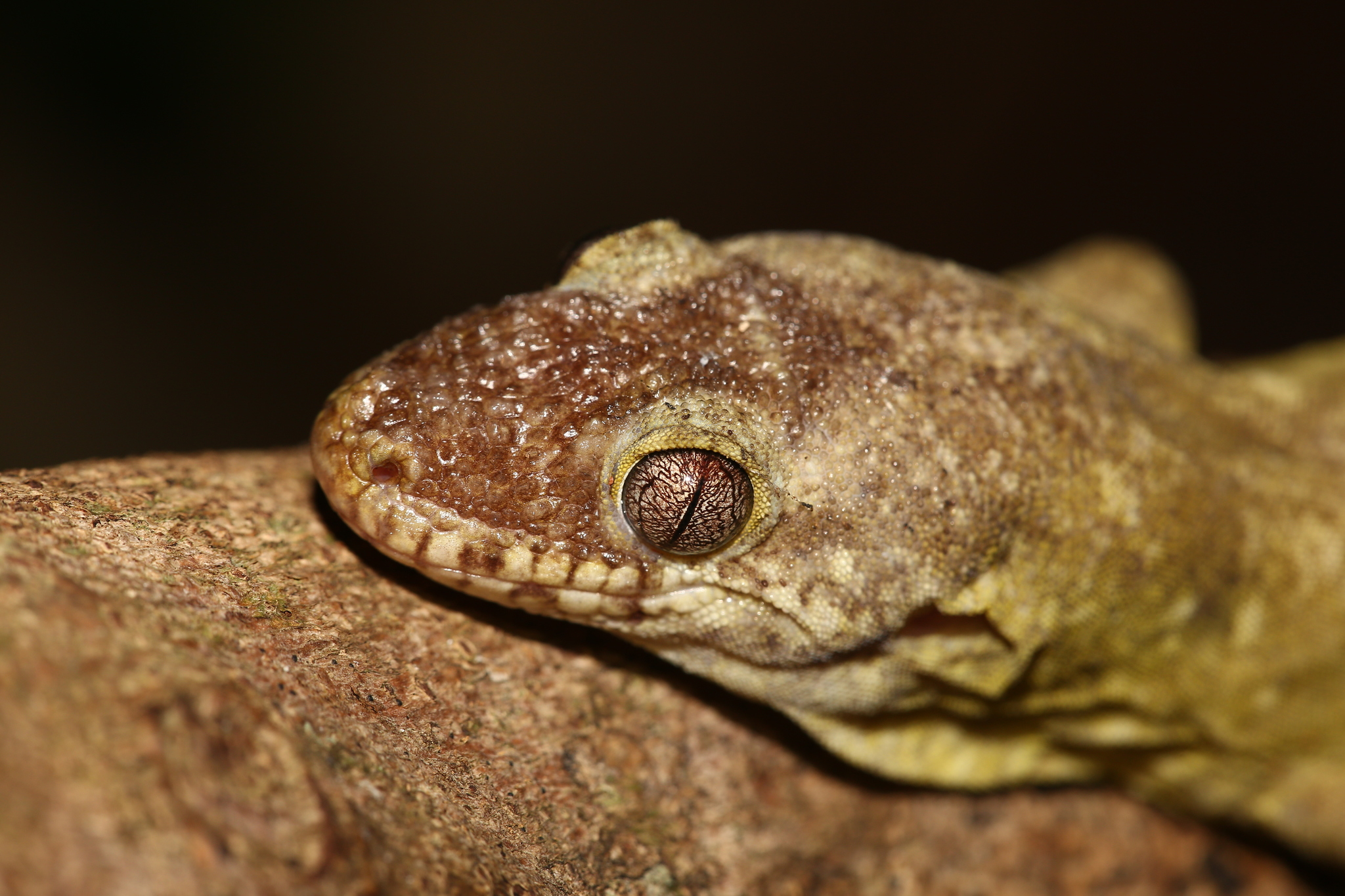
The head

== Taxonomy ==
Rhacodactylus trachycephalus was originally described by George Albert Boulenger in 1878. It was described as Chameleonurus trachycephalus the same year, also by Boulenger. In 2005, it was named as R. trachyrhynchus trachycephalus, a subspecies of Rhacodactylus trachyrhynchus, by Myers and again by Yuri Kaverkin in 2009. It was assigned to genus Rhacodactylus by Aaron Matthew Bauer in 2012, a treatment that produced the combination Rhacodactylus trachycephalus.

== Behavior ==
R. trachycephalus is viviparous, with it and R. trachyrhynchus being the only two species in their genus to exhibit viviparity. Viviparity in geckos is exclusive to New Zealand. R. trachycephalus generally gives birth to no more than two young per year, which is a very low rate of reproduction and partially why the species is so rare. To maintain a high level of heat and humidity, a large number of R. trachyrhynchus individuals will sometimes collect close together in shelters, a characteristic that is also exhibited by Underwoodisaurus milii. R. trachyrnhynchus individuals sleep in tree holes with their family.

=== Habitat partitioning ===
In regions where Rhacodactylus trachycephalus coexists with Rhacodactylus leachianus, the two species exhibit vertical habitat partitioning. R. trachycephalus tends to occupy lower forest strata, while R. leachianus is more commonly found in the higher canopy. This behavior minimizes interspecific competition by allowing each species to exploit different vertical niches within the same forest habitat.

== Distribution and conservation ==
R. trachycephalus is a rare species, living exclusively in New Caledonia. The species' range is extremely restricted; it only occurs on a small area of Isle of Pines and a small island off its shore, in humid forest habitats. The offshore island is small enough that its population could be completely destroyed in the event of a single disaster and both of these populations are extremely vulnerable.

R. trachycephalus is listed as Critically Endangered on the IUCN Red List and Endemia.nc, and it is protected in the Northern Province. The organism is threatened by illegal trade and fragmentation of habitat. Another factor is the infestation of the invasive little fire ant, which causes the offshore island populations to be especially at risk. It is also threatened by cats and rats, which prey on eggs, young, and adults; these invasive species, like the little fire ant, especially threaten the offshore island populations. These factors make it one of the most uncommon geckos alive currently, and possibly the rarest in the world.
