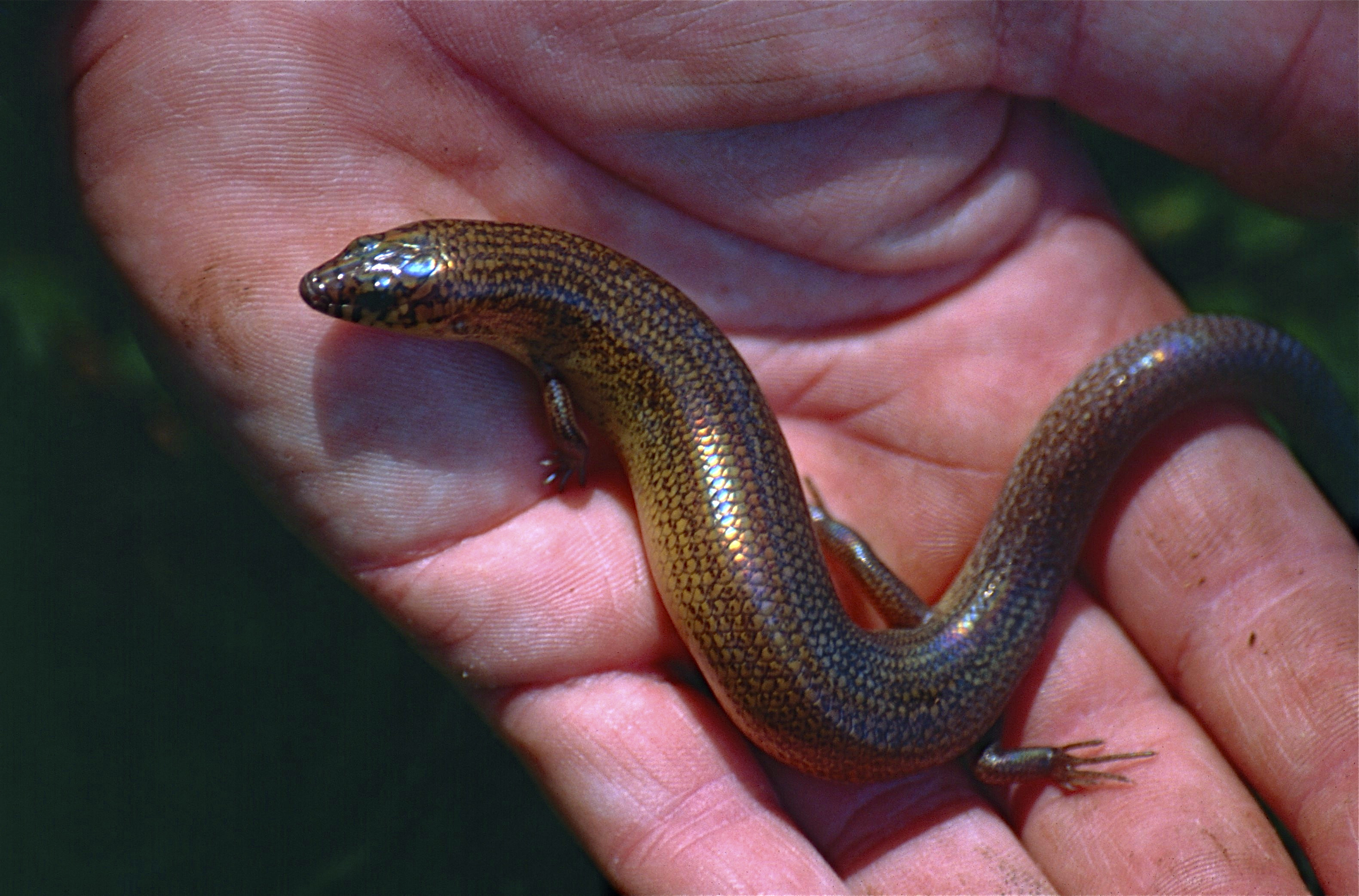
- Brachyseps anosyensis

Scientific classification
- Kingdom: Animalia
- Phylum: Chordata
- Class: Reptilia
- Order: Squamata
- Family: Scincidae
- Subfamily: Scincinae
- Genus: Brachyseps; Erens, Miralles, Glaw, Chatrou, & Vences, 2016

Species
- 7 sp., see text

= Brachyseps =

Genus of lizards

Brachyseps is a genus of skinks. They are all endemic to Madagascar. Some taxonomic authorities place the group in the genus Amphiglossus.

== Species ==
The following 7 species, listed alphabetically by specific name, are recognized as being valid:

- Brachyseps anosyensis Raxworthy & Nussbaum, 1993
- Brachyseps frontoparietalis (Boulenger, 1889) – Boulenger's tree skink
- Brachyseps gastrostictus (O'Shaughnessy, 1879) – O'Shaughnessy's Madagascar skink
- Brachyseps mandady Andreone & Greer, 2002
- Brachyseps punctatus Raxworthy & Nussbaum, 1993
- Brachyseps spilostichus Andreone & Greer, 2002
- Brachyseps splendidus (Grandidier, 1872) – splendid skink

Nota bene: A binomial authority in parentheses indicates that the species was originally described in a genus other than Brachyseps.
