= Brachyseps mandady =

Conservation status
- Data Deficient (IUCN 3.1)

Scientific classification
- Domain: Eukaryota
- Kingdom: Animalia
- Phylum: Chordata
- Class: Reptilia
- Order: Squamata
- Family: Scincidae
- Genus: Brachyseps
- Species: B. mandady

Binomial name
- Brachyseps mandady Andreone & Greer, 2002
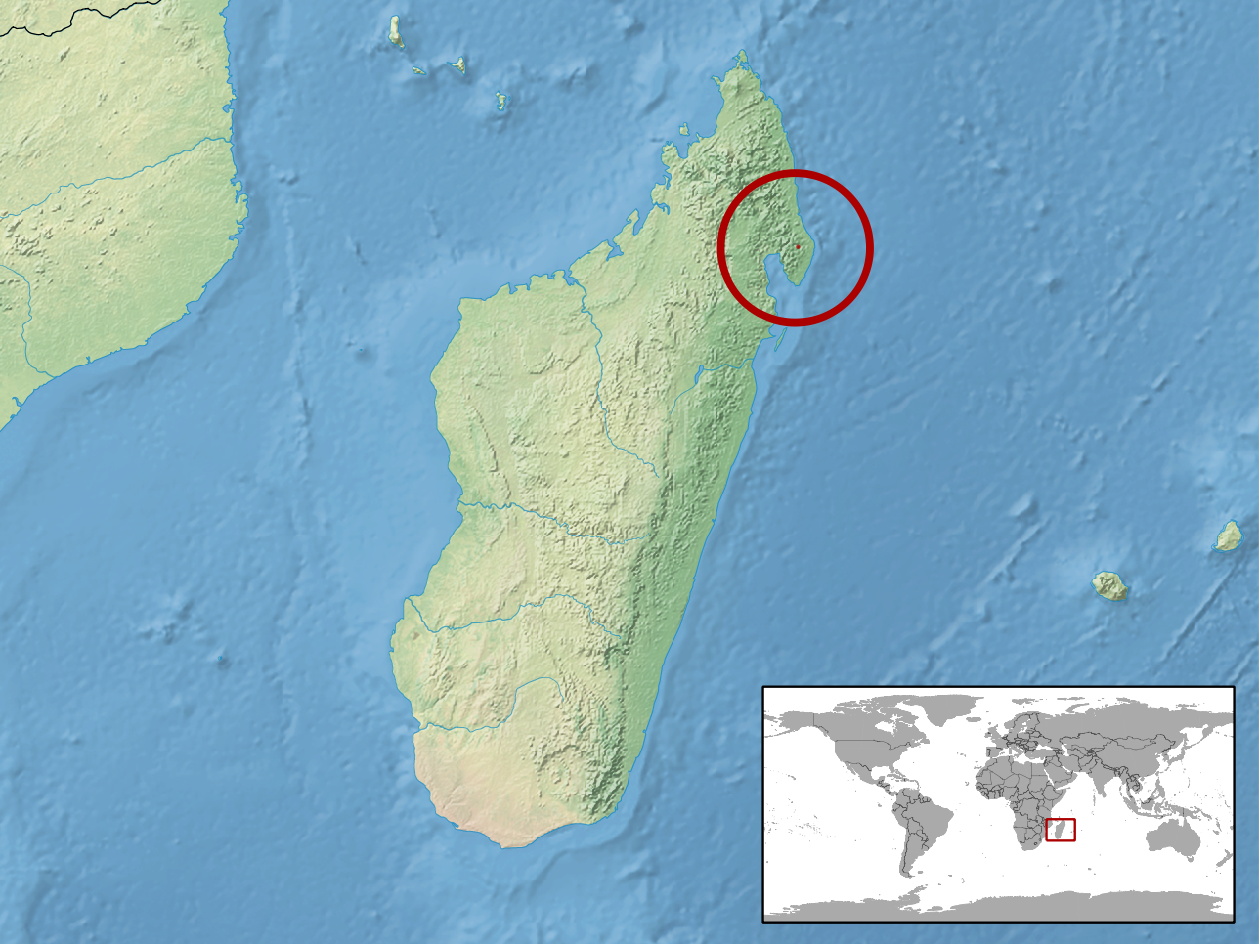

Synonyms
- Amphiglossus mandady

Species of lizard

Brachyseps mandady is a species of skink endemic to Madagascar.
