= Andinosaura hyposticta =

Conservation status
- Data Deficient (IUCN 3.1)

Scientific classification
- Kingdom: Animalia
- Phylum: Chordata
- Class: Reptilia
- Order: Squamata
- Family: Gymnophthalmidae
- Genus: Andinosaura
- Species: A. hyposticta

Binomial name
- Andinosaura hyposticta (Boulenger, 1902)

Synonyms
- Riama hyposticta

Species of lizard

Andinosaura hyposticta, Boulenger's lightbulb lizard, is a species of lizard in the family Gymnophthalmidae. It is endemic to Ecuador.
