= Andinosaura vespertina =

Scientific classification
- Kingdom: Animalia
- Phylum: Chordata
- Class: Reptilia
- Order: Squamata
- Family: Gymnophthalmidae
- Genus: Andinosaura
- Species: A. vespertina

Binomial name
- Andinosaura vespertina (Kirizian, 1996)

Synonyms
- Riama vespertina

Species of lizard

Andinosaura vespertina is a species of lizard in the family Gymnophthalmidae. It is endemic to Ecuador.
