= Andinosaura =

Scientific classification
- Kingdom: Animalia
- Phylum: Chordata
- Class: Reptilia
- Order: Squamata
- Family: Gymnophthalmidae
- Genus: Andinosaura; Sánchez-Pacheco, Torres-Carvajal, Aguirre-Peñafiel, Sales-Nunes, Verrastro, Rivas, Rodrigues, Grant & R. Murphy, 2018

Genus of lizards

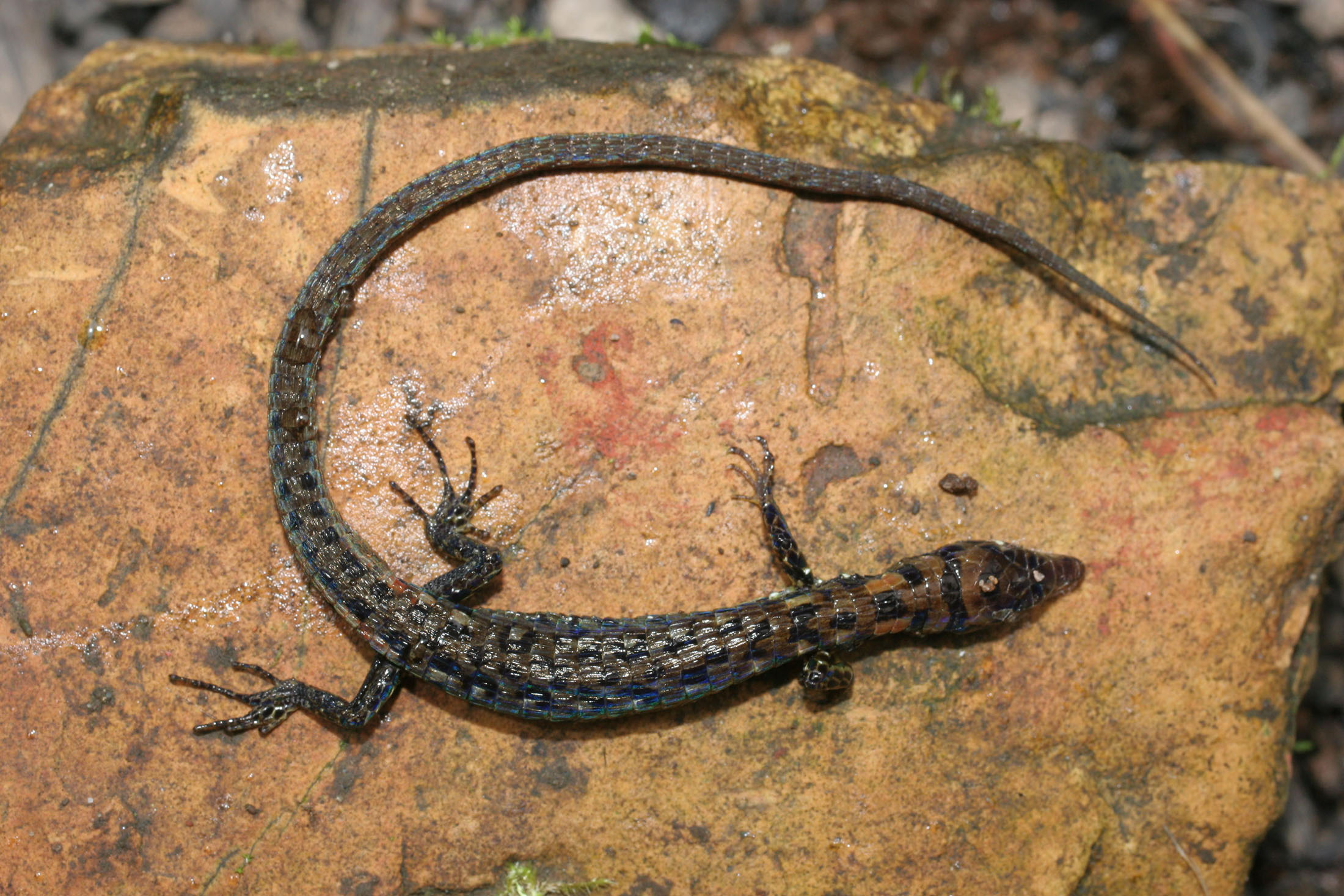

Andinosaura is a genus of lizards in the subfamily Cercosaurinae of the family Gymnophthalmidae. The genus is endemic to South America.

== Species ==
The genus Andinosaura contains 11 species which are recognized as being valid.

- Andinosaura afrania (Arredondo & Sánchez-Pacheco, 2010)
- Andinosaura aurea (Sánchez-Pacheco, Aguirre-Peñafiel & Torres-Carvajal, 2012)
- Andinosaura crypta (Sánchez-Pacheco, Kizirian & Sales-Nunes, 2011)
- Andinosaura hyposticta (Boulenger, 1902) – Boulenger's lightbulb lizard
- Andinosaura kiziriani (Sánchez-Pacheco, Aguirre-Peñafiel & Torres-Carvajal, 2012)
- Andinosaura laevis (Boulenger, 1908) – shiny lightbulb lizard
- Andinosaura oculata (O'Shaughnessy, 1879) – tropical lightbulb lizard
- Andinosaura petrorum (Kizirian, 1996)
- Andinosaura stellae (Sánchez-Pacheco, 2010)
- Andinosaura vespertina (Kizirian, 1996)
- Andinosaura vieta (Kizirian, 1996)

Nota bene: A binomial authority in parentheses indicates that the species was originally described in a genus other than Andinosaura.
