= Andinosaura stellae =

Conservation status
- Data Deficient (IUCN 3.1)

Scientific classification
- Kingdom: Animalia
- Phylum: Chordata
- Class: Reptilia
- Order: Squamata
- Family: Gymnophthalmidae
- Genus: Andinosaura
- Species: A. stellae

Binomial name
- Andinosaura stellae (Sánchez-Pacheco, 2010)

Synonyms
- Riama stellae

Species of lizard

Andinosaura stellae is a species of lizard in the family Gymnophthalmidae. It is endemic to Colombia.
