= Andinosaura aurea =

Conservation status
- Vulnerable (IUCN 3.1)

Scientific classification
- Kingdom: Animalia
- Phylum: Chordata
- Class: Reptilia
- Order: Squamata
- Family: Gymnophthalmidae
- Genus: Andinosaura
- Species: A. aurea

Binomial name
- Andinosaura aurea (Sánchez-Pacheco, Aguirre-Penafiel, & Torres-Carvajal, 2012)

Synonyms
- Riama aurea

Species of lizard

Andinosaura aurea is a species of lizard in the family Gymnophthalmidae. It is endemic to Ecuador.
