= Andinosaura kiziriani =

Conservation status
- Endangered (IUCN 3.1)

Scientific classification
- Kingdom: Animalia
- Phylum: Chordata
- Class: Reptilia
- Order: Squamata
- Family: Gymnophthalmidae
- Genus: Andinosaura
- Species: A. kiziriani

Binomial name
- Andinosaura kiziriani (Sánchez-Pacheco, Aguirre-Peñafiel & Torres-Carvajal, 2012)

Synonyms
- Riama kiziriani Sánchez-Pacheco, Aguirre-Peñafiel & Torres-Carvajal, 2012

Species of lizard

Andinosaura kiziriani is a species of lizard in the subfamily Cercosaurinae of the family Gymnophthalmidae. The species is endemic to Ecuador.

== Etymology ==
The specific name, kiziriani, is in honor of American herpetologist David A. Kizirian.

== Description ==
A small species of lizard, Andinosaura kiziriani may attain a snout-to-vent length (SVL) of approximately 6 cm (2.4 in).

== Geographic distribution ==
Andinosaura kiziriani is found in southern Ecuador, in Azuay Province.

== Habitat ==
The preferred natural habitat of Andinosaura kiziriani is forest, at elevations of 1,900–2,546 m (6,234–8,353 ft)

== Reproduction ==
Andinosaura kiziriani is oviparous.
