= Contomastix =

Scientific classification
- Kingdom: Animalia
- Phylum: Chordata
- Class: Reptilia
- Order: Squamata
- Family: Teiidae
- Subfamily: Teiinae
- Genus: Contomastix; Harvey, Ugueto & Gutberlet, 2012

Genus of lizards

Contomastix is a genus of lizards in the family Teiidae. The genus is endemic to South America.

== Species ==
The genus Contomastix contains the following six species which are recognized as being valid, listed alphabetically.

- Contomastix celata Cabrera, Carreira, Di Pietro & Rivera, 2019
- Contomastix lacertoides (A.M.C. Duméril & Bibron, 1839) – Bibron's whiptail
- Contomastix leachei (Peracca, 1897)
- Contomastix serrana (Cei & Martori, 1991)
- Contomastix vacariensis (Feltrim & Lema, 2000)
- Contomastix vittata (Boulenger, 1902)

Nota bene: A binomial authority in parentheses indicates that the species was originally described in a genus other than Contomastix.
