= Rhacodactylus trachyrhynchus =

Rough-snouted giant gecko

Conservation status
- Vulnerable (IUCN 3.1)

Scientific classification
- Kingdom: Animalia
- Phylum: Chordata
- Class: Reptilia
- Order: Squamata
- Suborder: Gekkota
- Family: Diplodactylidae
- Genus: Rhacodactylus
- Species: R. trachyrhynchus

Binomial name
- Rhacodactylus trachyrhynchus Bocage, 1873

Species of lizard

The rough-snouted giant gecko (Rhacodactylus trachyrhynchus), also known as the greater rough-snouted gecko or tough-snouted gecko, is a species of gecko found in New Caledonia.

== Description ==
The common name of the rough-snouted giant gecko refers to the enlarged scales that cover its snout. Other characteristics of this gecko include broad toes and a prehensile tail. the rough-snouted giant gecko has a mottled color pattern, generally a grayish-green to brown mixed with white. Its body length (BDL) is usually around 19 centimetres (7.5 in), making it a large gecko species, with its tail being roughly the same length.

== Behavior and habitat ==
The rough-snouted giant gecko is a nocturnal species, hunting in the nighttime and taking shelter in the daytime. It lives in forests, mostly in tropical and subtropical climates but also in forests with evergreen trees. It exhibits ovoviviparity, causing it to have a lower reproductive rate than other species in its genus. Like all Rhacodactylus geckos, the rough-snouted giant gecko is an omnivore. Its diet consists mainly of insects and fruit, and can include as well small lizards and nestling birds and rodents.

== Distribution ==
The rough-snouted giant gecko lives only in several small areas in New Caledonia. Sparse populations are known from Province Sud and Province Nord, specifically in Ile des Pins and small parts of Grand Terre, the main island of New Caledonia. Its occupies a total of 149 km^{2} of land up to 500 metres (1,600 ft) above sea level.

Although the exact population trend of the rough-snouted giant gecko is unknown, both its range and population size are declining for a number of reasons. Habitat loss is one of its major threats, specifically due to wildfires, larger animals such as pigs destroying its habitat, and humans clearing its forests in favor of farmland. In addition, rodents and cats were introduced to the area, which prey on the gecko; fire ants (i.e. Wasmannia auropunctata) are a danger as well. The species has also been collected and traded illegally in some areas, sometimes being used as a pet. Although some of the areas it lives in are protected, no conservation actions are taking place for the species. The decline of its population and its small distribution cause it to be listed as vulnerable on the IUCN Red List of Threatened Species and has been assessed as vulnerable by Endemia.

== Breeding ==
The rough-snouted giant gecko is the only Rhacodactylus gecko that gives live birth. It is sometimes seen in captivity and as an arboreal species, requires a vertically oriented terrarium. Males should be housed separately or as a part of a breeding pair or trio with females. Although males housed together will often fight, females are social and can be housed together.

== Taxonomy ==
The description of the species was published by José Vicente Barbosa du Bocage in 1873. A population assigned as a subspecies, originally described by George Boulenger in 1878 as species Chameleonurus trachycephalus, has been recognised as species Rhacodactylus trachycephalus.
