= Sceloporus oberon =

Conservation status
- Vulnerable (IUCN 3.1)

Scientific classification
- Kingdom: Animalia
- Phylum: Chordata
- Class: Reptilia
- Order: Squamata
- Suborder: Iguania
- Family: Phrynosomatidae
- Genus: Sceloporus
- Species: S. oberon

Binomial name
- Sceloporus oberon H.M. Smith & B.C. Brown, 1941

Synonyms
- Sceloporus jarrovii oberon H.M. Smith & B.C. Brown, 1941; Sceloporus minor oberon H.M. Smith & B.C. Brown, 1941; Sceloporus ornatus oberon H.M. Smith & B.C. Brown, 1941

Species of lizard

Sceloporus oberon, also known commonly as the Oberon spiny lizard, the royal lesser minor lizard, and la lagartija menor negra in Mexican Spanish, is a species of lizard in the subfamily Sceloporinae of the family Phrynosomatidae. The species is endemic to Mexico.

== Etymology ==
The specific name, oberon, is an allusion to Oberon, king of the fairies in Shakespeare's A Midsummer Night's Dream.

== Geographic distribution ==
Sceloporus oberon is found in the Mexican States of Coahuila and Nuevo León.

== Habitat ==
The preferred natural habitat of Sceloporus oberon is rocky areas in forest.

== Behavior ==
Sceloporus oberon is terrestrial and saxicolous (rock-dwelling).

== Diet ==
Sceloporus oberon preys upon centipedes.

== Reproduction ==
Sceloporus oberon is viviparous.
