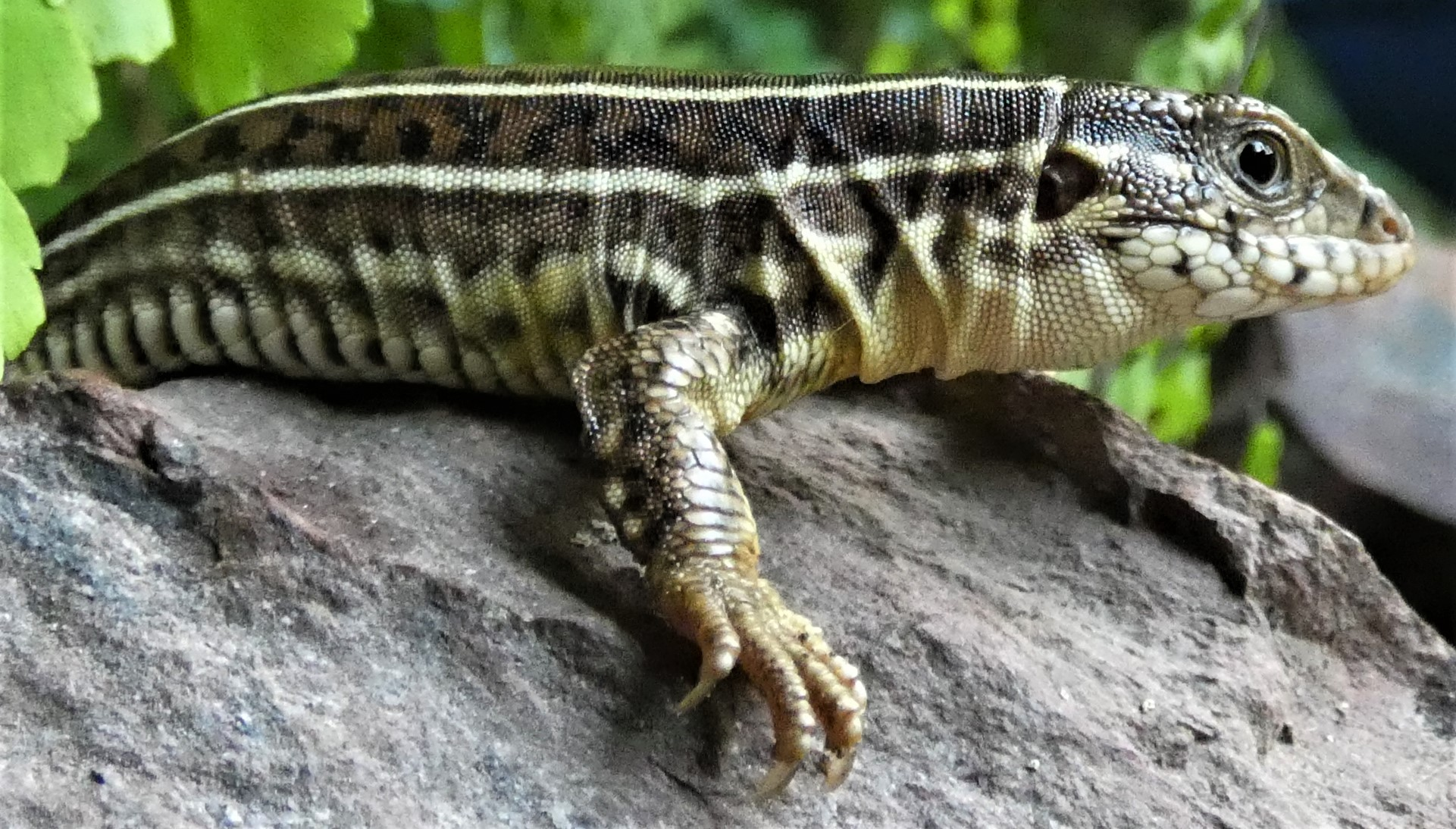

Scientific classification
- Domain: Eukaryota
- Kingdom: Animalia
- Phylum: Chordata
- Class: Reptilia
- Order: Squamata
- Family: Teiidae
- Genus: Contomastix
- Species: C. lacertoides

Binomial name
- Contomastix lacertoides (A.M.C. Duméril & Bibron, 1839)

= Contomastix lacertoides =

Species of lizard

Contomastix lacertoides, Bibron's whiptail, is a species of teiid lizard found in Uruguay and Brazil.
