= Cyrtodactylus chrysopylos =

Conservation status
- Vulnerable (IUCN 3.1)

Scientific classification
- Kingdom: Animalia
- Phylum: Chordata
- Class: Reptilia
- Order: Squamata
- Suborder: Gekkota
- Family: Gekkonidae
- Genus: Cyrtodactylus
- Species: C. chrysopylos

Binomial name
- Cyrtodactylus chrysopylos Bauer, 2003
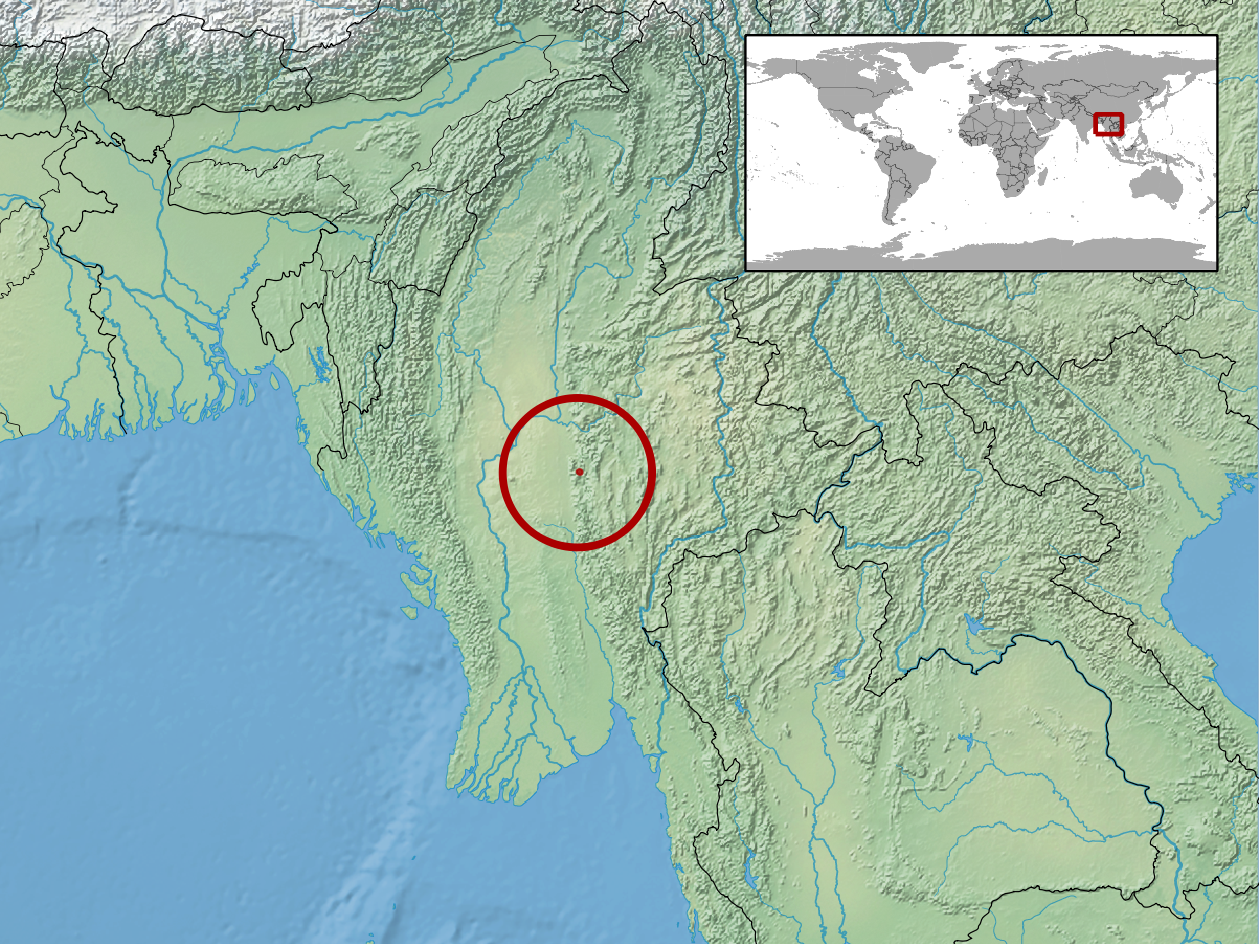

Species of lizard

Cyrtodactylus chrysopylos is a species of gecko that is endemic to Pyadalin Cave Wildlife Sanctuary, Shan State in Myanmar.
