= Chiku bent-toed gecko =

Conservation status
- Vulnerable (IUCN 3.1)

Scientific classification
- Kingdom: Animalia
- Phylum: Chordata
- Class: Reptilia
- Order: Squamata
- Suborder: Gekkota
- Family: Gekkonidae
- Genus: Cyrtodactylus
- Species: C. hidupselamanya

Binomial name
- Cyrtodactylus hidupselamanya Grismer, Wood, Anaur, Grismer, Quah, Murdoch, Muin, Davis, Aguilar, Klabacka, Cobos, Aowphol, & Sites, 2016

Species of lizard

The Chiku bent-toed gecko (Cyrtodactylus hidupselamanya) is a species of gecko that is endemic to peninsular Malaysia.
