= Oaxacan coral snake =

Conservation status
- Vulnerable (IUCN 3.1)

Scientific classification
- Kingdom: Animalia
- Phylum: Chordata
- Class: Reptilia
- Order: Squamata
- Suborder: Serpentes
- Family: Elapidae
- Genus: Micrurus
- Species: M. ephippifer

Binomial name
- Micrurus ephippifer (Cope, 1886)
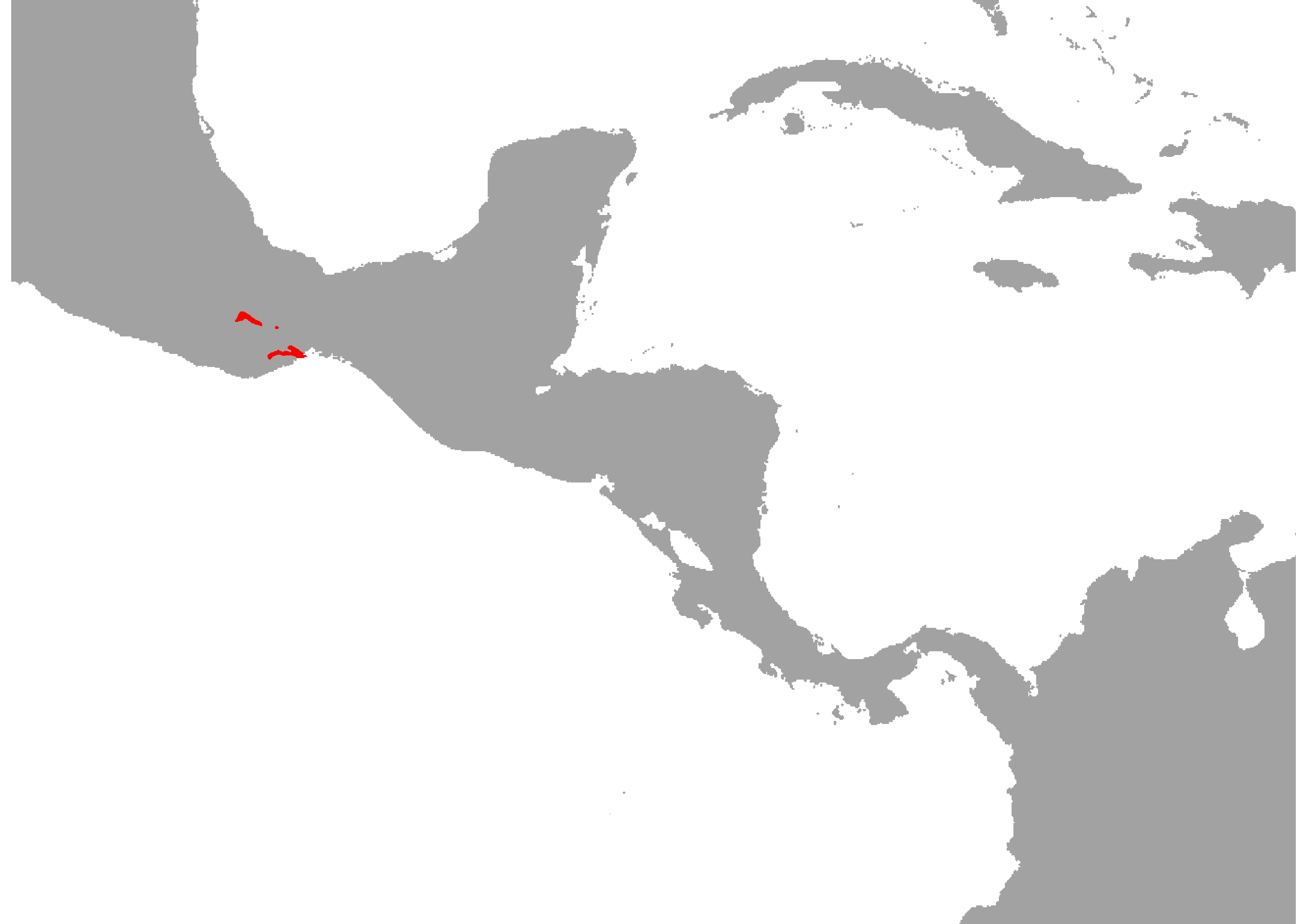

Synonyms
- Elaps ephippifer Cope, 1866

Species of snake

The Oaxacan coral snake (Micrurus ephippifer), also known commonly as the double black coral snake, is a species of venomous snake in the family Elapidae. The species is endemic to Mexico. There are two recognized subspecies.

== Local common names ==
Local common names in Mexican Spanish for Micrurus ephippifer include coralillo doble negro and serpiente-coralillo oaxaqueña.

== Geographic distribution and habitat ==
Micrurus ephippifer occurs in tropical deciduous forest and pine-oak forest from near sea level to over 2,300 m (7,500 ft) on the Pacific versant of the Mexican state of Oaxaca, from central Oaxaca to the lowlands and foothills of the Isthmus of Tehuantepec.

== Behavior ==
Micrurus ephippifer is terrestrial.

== Reproduction ==
Micrurus ephippifer is oviparous.

== Subspecies ==
Two subspecies are recognized as being valid, including the nominotypical subspecies.

- Micrurus ephippifer ephippifer (Cope, 1886)
- Micrurus ephippifer zapotectus Roze, 1989

Nota bene: A trinomial authority in parentheses indicates that the subspecies was originally described in a genus other than Micrurus.
