= Anolis monticola =

Conservation status
- Vulnerable (IUCN 3.1)

Scientific classification
- Kingdom: Animalia
- Phylum: Chordata
- Class: Reptilia
- Order: Squamata
- Suborder: Iguania
- Family: Dactyloidae
- Genus: Anolis
- Species: A. monticola

Binomial name
- Anolis monticola Shreve, 1936

Species of lizard

Anolis monticola, the La Hotte bush anole or foothill anole, is a species of lizard in the family Dactyloidae. The species is found in Haiti.
