= Brachyseps frontoparietalis =

Boulenger's tree skink

Conservation status
- Least Concern (IUCN 3.1)

Scientific classification
- Domain: Eukaryota
- Kingdom: Animalia
- Phylum: Chordata
- Class: Reptilia
- Order: Squamata
- Family: Scincidae
- Genus: Brachyseps
- Species: B. frontoparietalis

Binomial name
- Brachyseps frontoparietalis (Boulenger, 1889)
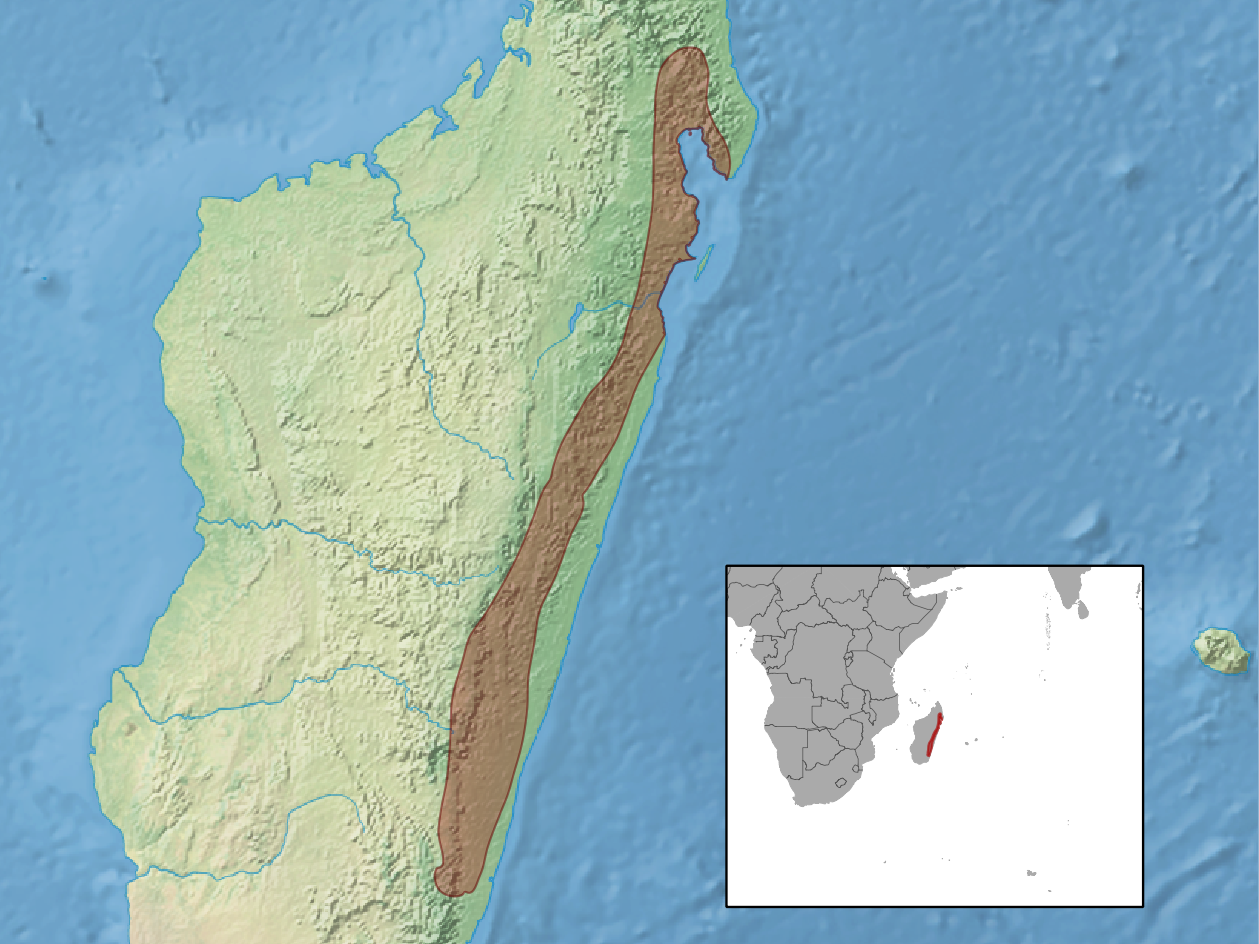

Synonyms
- Amphiglossus frontoparietalis

Species of lizard

Brachyseps frontoparietalis, Boulenger's tree skink, is a species of skink endemic to Madagascar.
