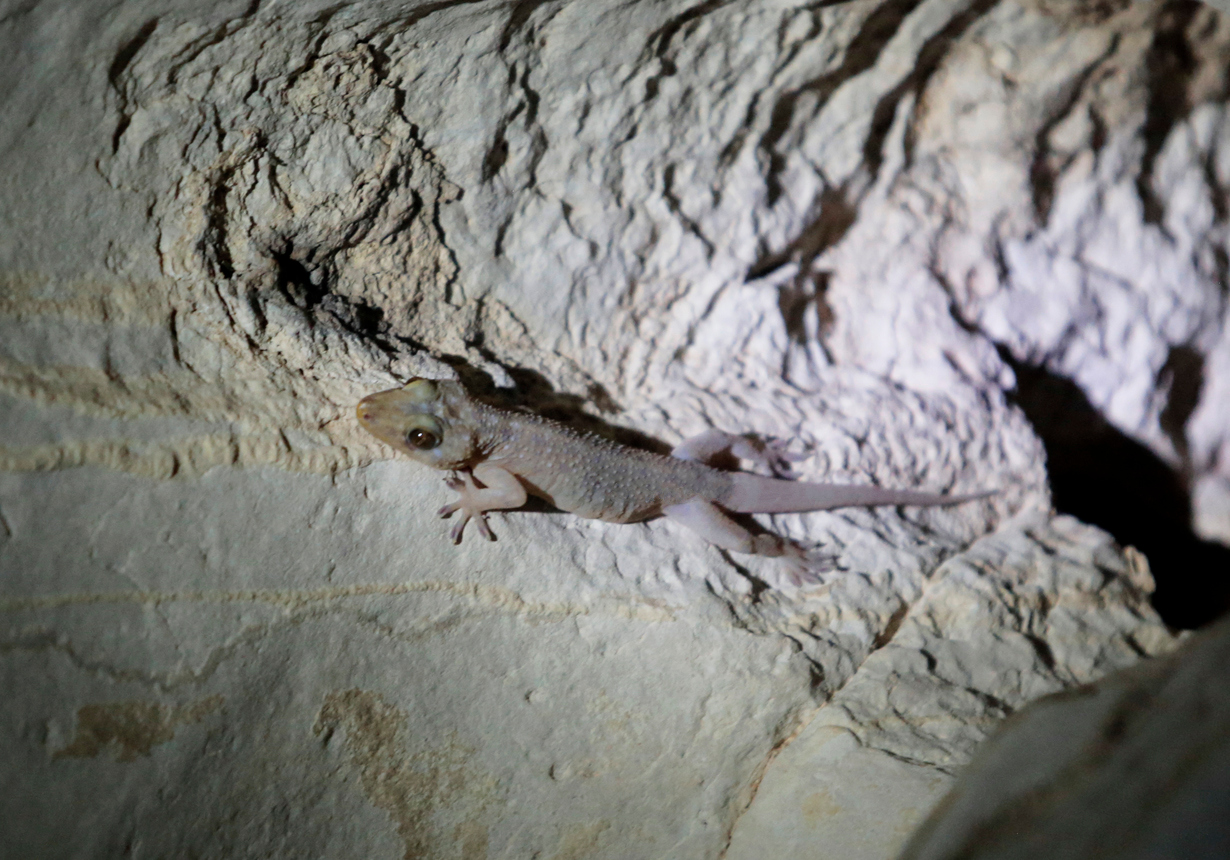

Conservation status
- Vulnerable (IUCN 3.1)

Scientific classification
- Kingdom: Animalia
- Phylum: Chordata
- Class: Reptilia
- Order: Squamata
- Suborder: Gekkota
- Family: Gekkonidae
- Genus: Gekko
- Species: G. gigante

Binomial name
- Gekko gigante Brown and Alcala, 1978
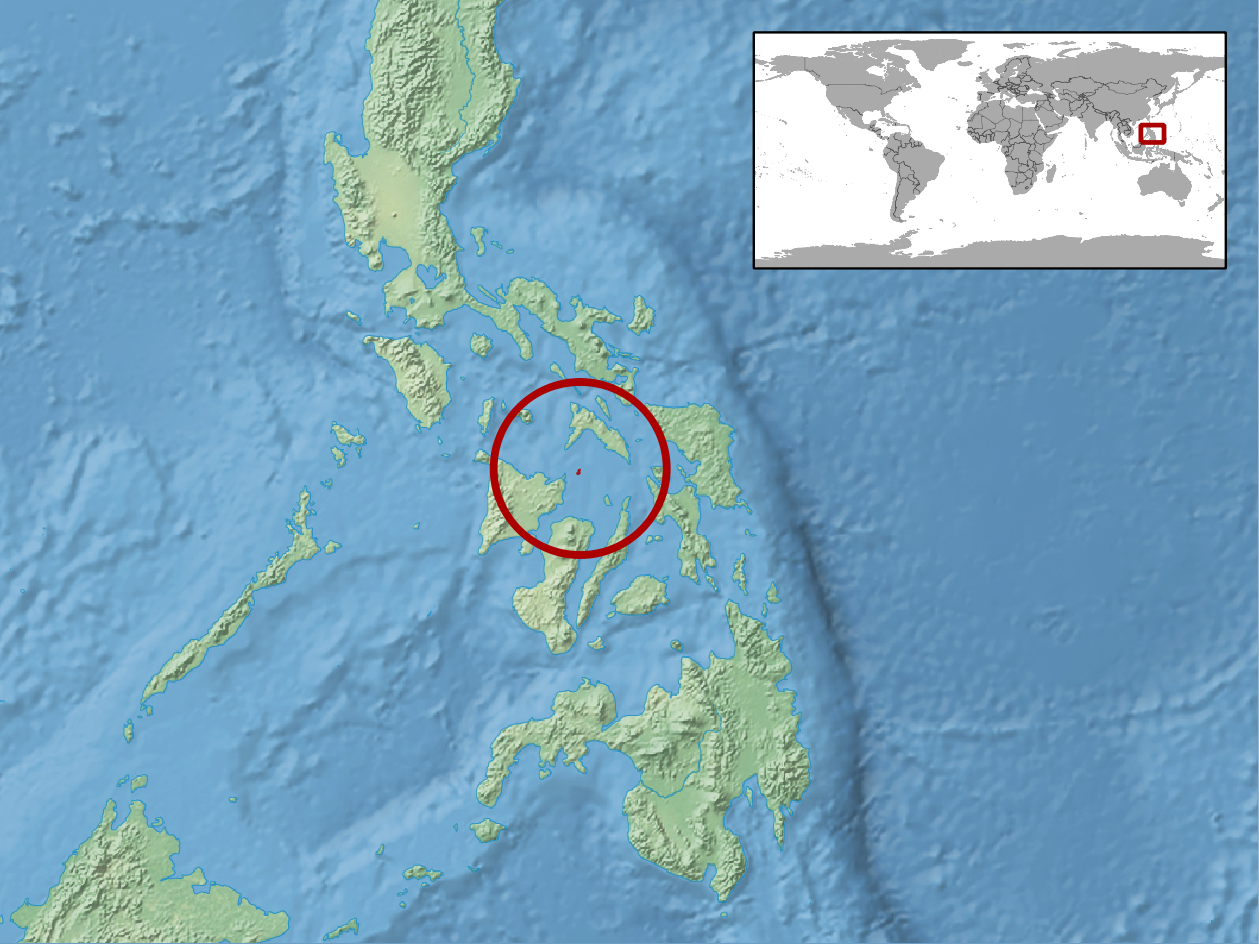

= Gekko gigante =

Species of lizard

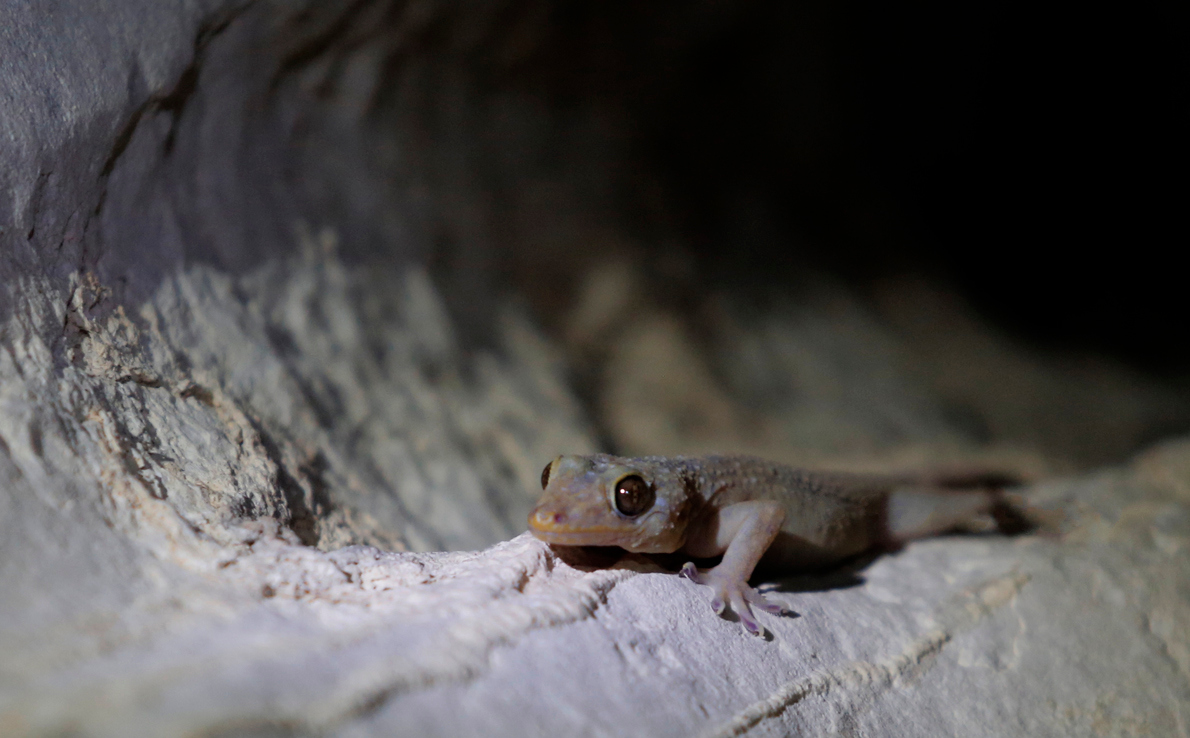
Gekko gigante

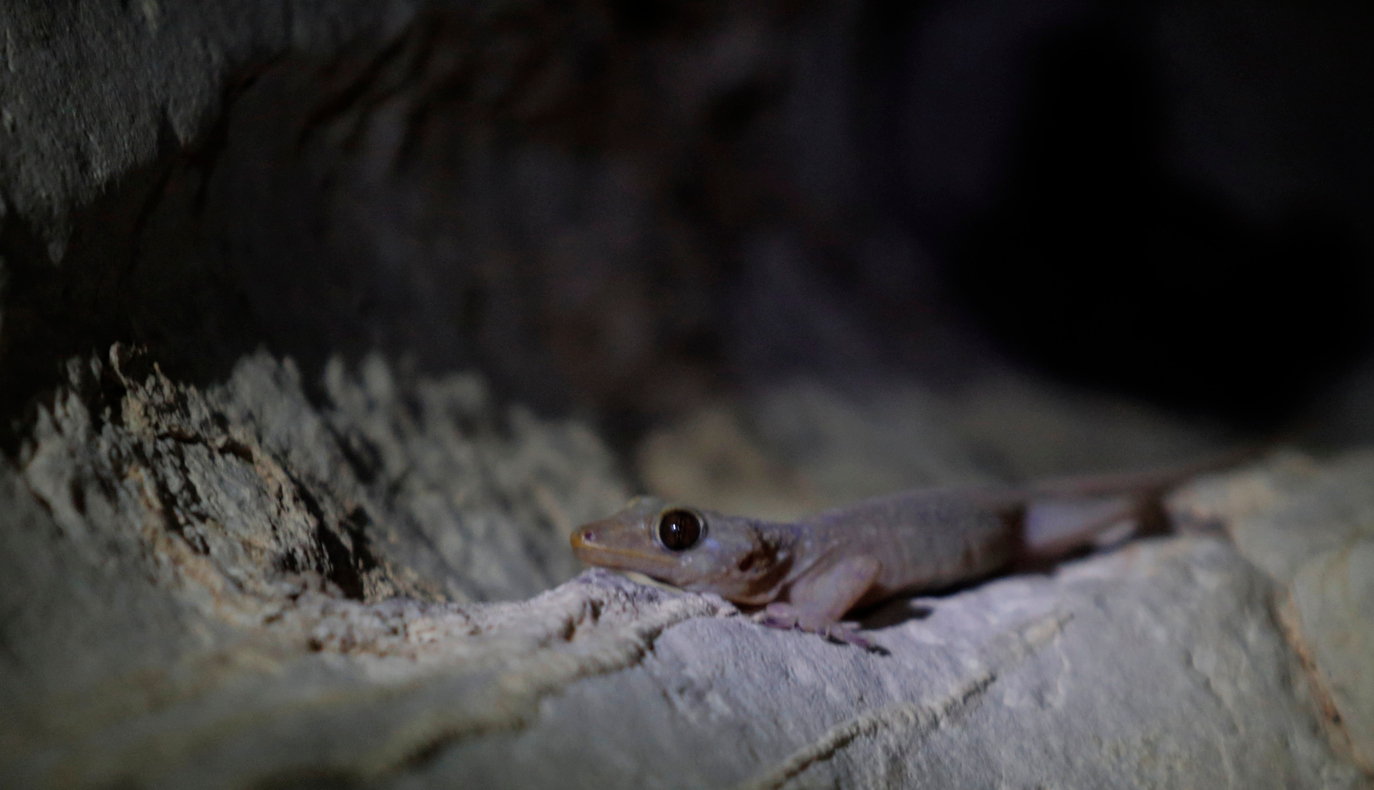
Gekko gigante

Gekko gigante, also known as the Gigante narrow-disked gecko or the Gigante gecko, is a species of gecko found in the Gigantes Islands in Carles, Iloilo Philippines.
