= Sceloporus maculosus =

Conservation status
- Vulnerable (IUCN 3.1)

Scientific classification
- Kingdom: Animalia
- Phylum: Chordata
- Class: Reptilia
- Order: Squamata
- Suborder: Iguania
- Family: Phrynosomatidae
- Genus: Sceloporus
- Species: S. maculosus

Binomial name
- Sceloporus maculosus H.M. Smith, 1934

Species of lizard

Sceloporus maculosus, the spotted spiny lizard or northern snub-nosed lizard, is a species of lizard in the family Phrynosomatidae. It is endemic to Mexico.
