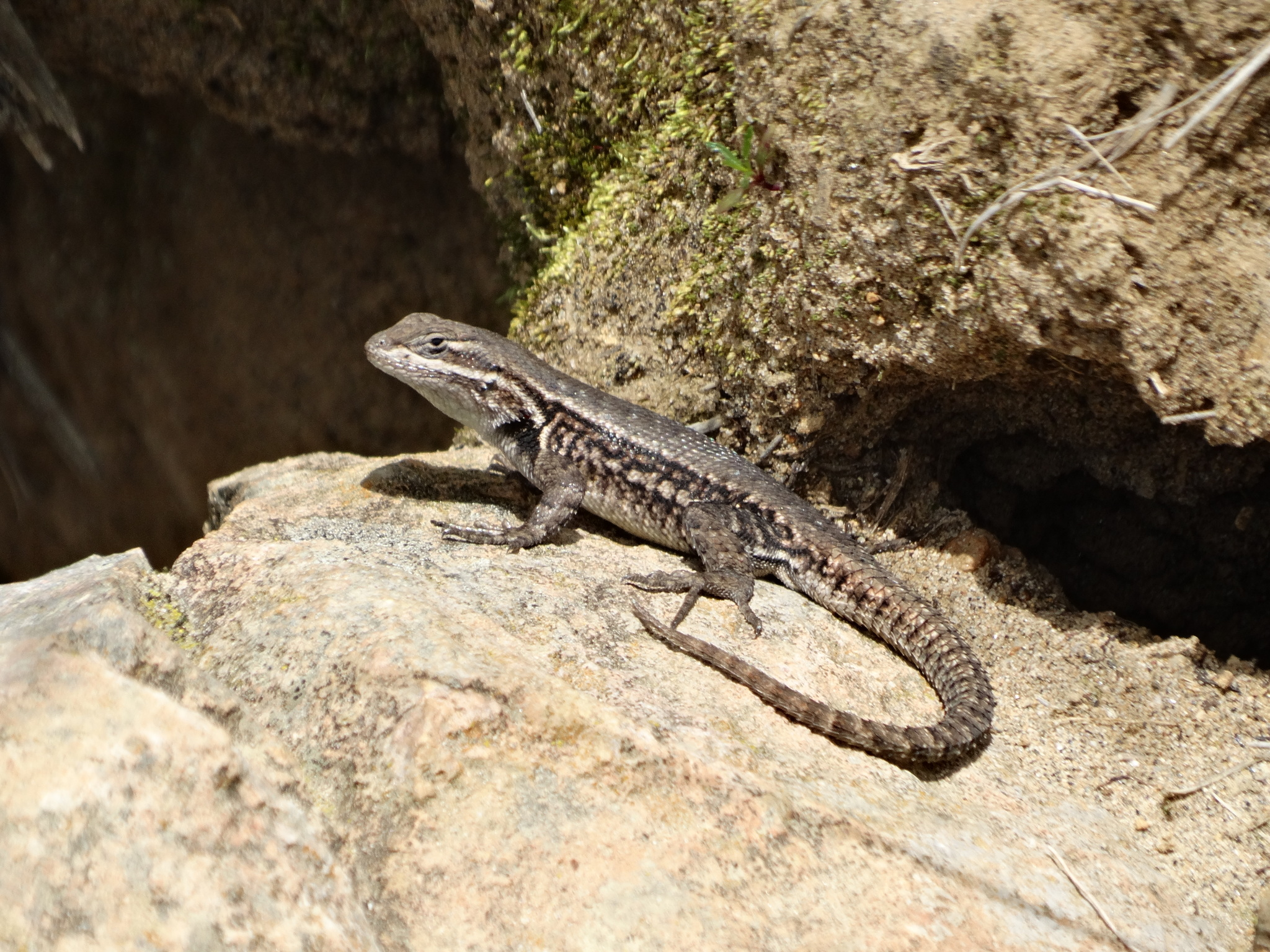

Conservation status
- Vulnerable (IUCN 3.1)

Scientific classification
- Domain: Eukaryota
- Kingdom: Animalia
- Phylum: Chordata
- Class: Reptilia
- Order: Squamata
- Suborder: Iguania
- Family: Phrynosomatidae
- Genus: Sceloporus
- Species: S. megalepidurus

Binomial name
- Sceloporus megalepidurus H.M. Smith, 1934

Synonyms
- largescale spiny lizard, cursorial spiny lizard, and dull cursorial spiny lizard.

= Sceloporus megalepidurus =

Species of lizard

Sceloporus megalepidurus, the largescale spiny lizard, cursorial spiny lizard, or dull cursorial spiny lizard, is a species of lizard in the family Phrynosomatidae. It is endemic to Mexico.
