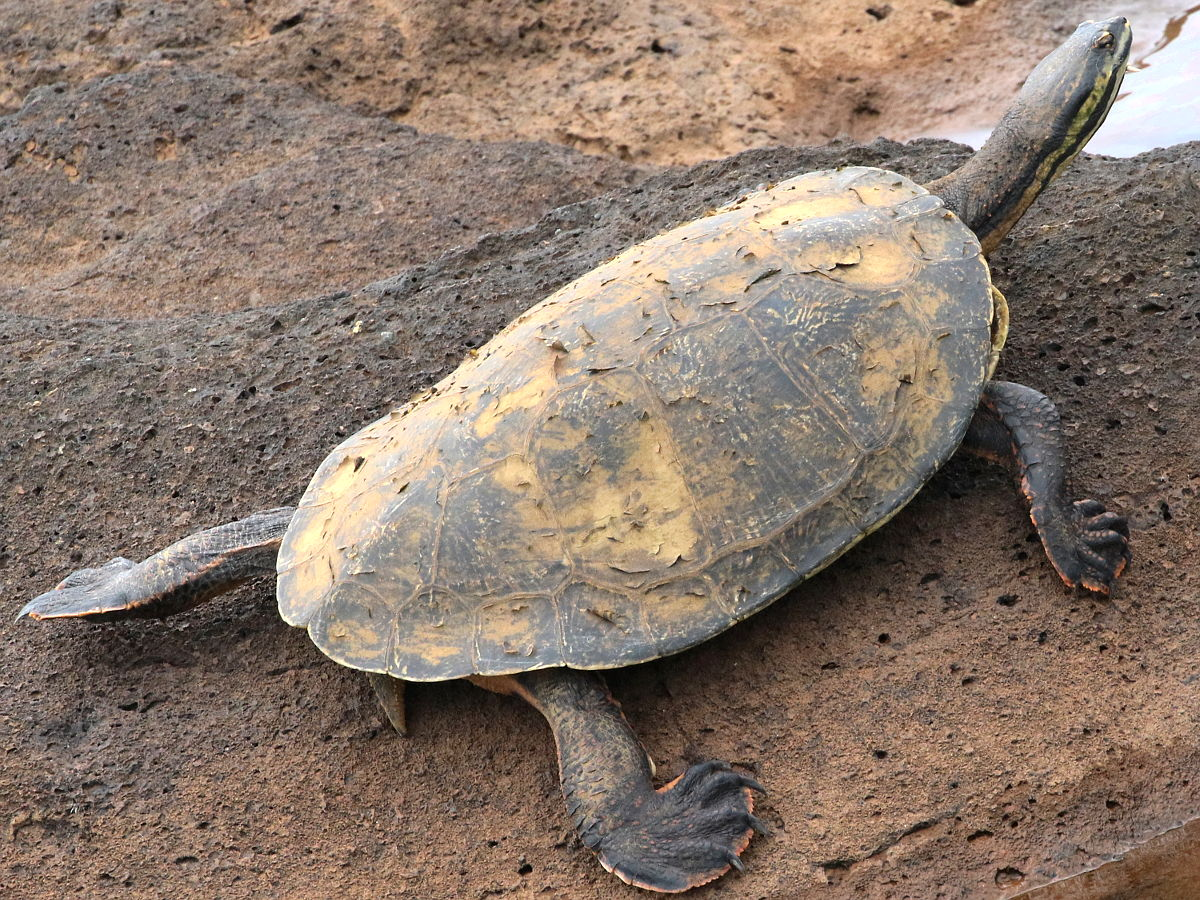

Conservation status
- Vulnerable (IUCN 3.1)

Scientific classification
- Kingdom: Animalia
- Phylum: Chordata
- Class: Reptilia
- Order: Testudines
- Suborder: Pleurodira
- Family: Chelidae
- Genus: Phrynops
- Species: P. williamsi

Binomial name
- Phrynops williamsi Rhodin & Mittermeier, 1983

= Phrynops williamsi =

Species of turtle

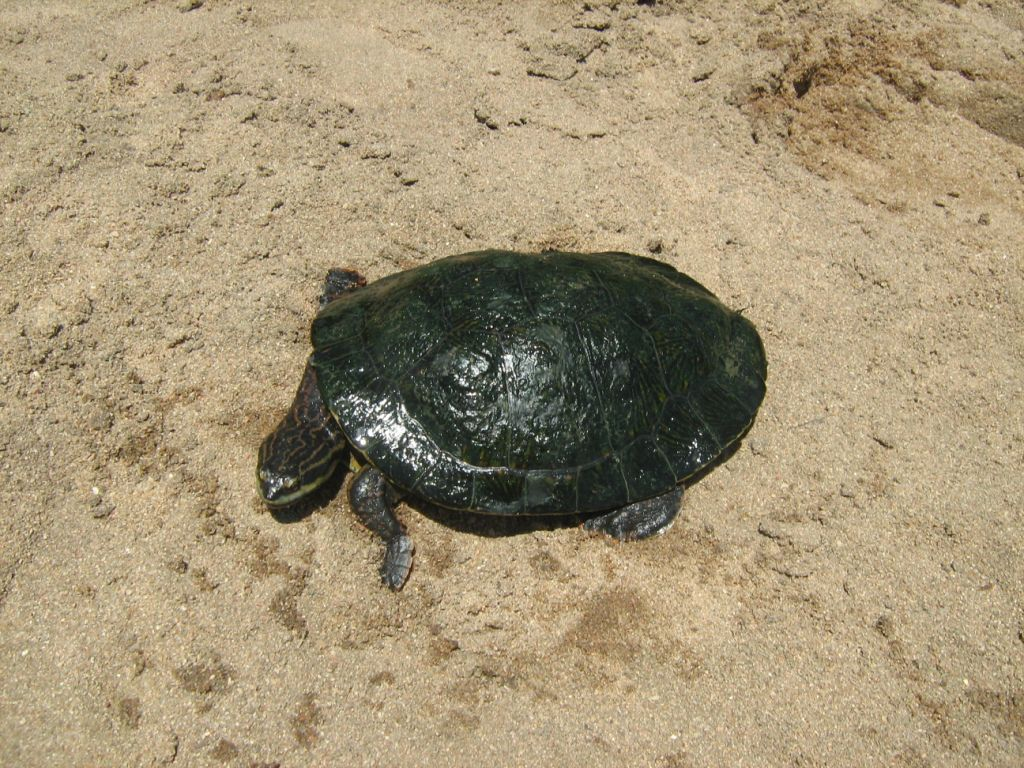

Phrynops williamsi, also known commonly as Williams' side-necked turtle, Williams' South American sideneck turtle, William's [sic] South American side-necked turtle, William's [sic] toadhead turtle, and Williams' toadhead turtle, is a species of turtle in the family Chelidae. The species is endemic to South America.

== Etymology ==
The specific name, williamsi, is in honor of American herpetologist Ernest E. Williams.

== Geographic range ==
P. williamsi is found in southeastern Brazil, Uruguay, and Argentina.

== Habitat ==
The preferred natural habitat of P. williamsi is freshwater wetlands, at altitudes of 80–1,000 m (260–3,280 ft).
