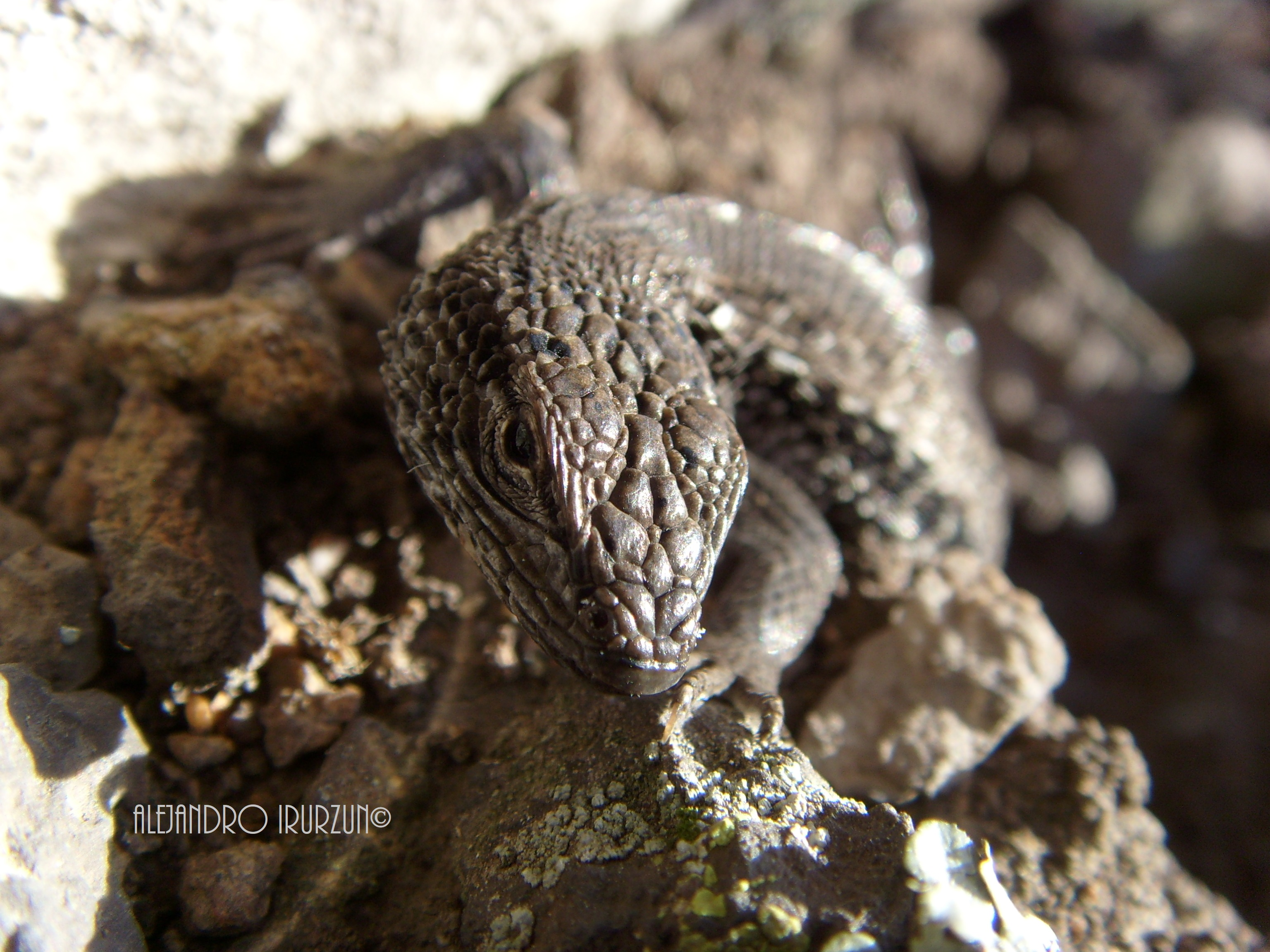

Conservation status
- Vulnerable (IUCN 3.1)

Scientific classification
- Kingdom: Animalia
- Phylum: Chordata
- Class: Reptilia
- Order: Squamata
- Suborder: Iguania
- Family: Liolaemidae
- Genus: Liolaemus
- Species: L. tandiliensis

Binomial name
- Liolaemus tandiliensis Vega, Bellagamba, & Lobo, 2008

= Liolaemus tandiliensis =

Species of lizard

Liolaemus tandiliensis is a species of lizard in the family Liolaemidae. The species is endemic to Argentina.
