= Contomastix vittata =

Conservation status
- Vulnerable (IUCN 3.1)

Scientific classification
- Kingdom: Animalia
- Phylum: Chordata
- Class: Reptilia
- Order: Squamata
- Suborder: Lacertoidea
- Family: Teiidae
- Genus: Contomastix
- Species: C. vittata

Binomial name
- Contomastix vittata (Boulenger, 1902)

Species of lizard

Contomastix vittata is a species of teiid lizard endemic to Bolivia.
