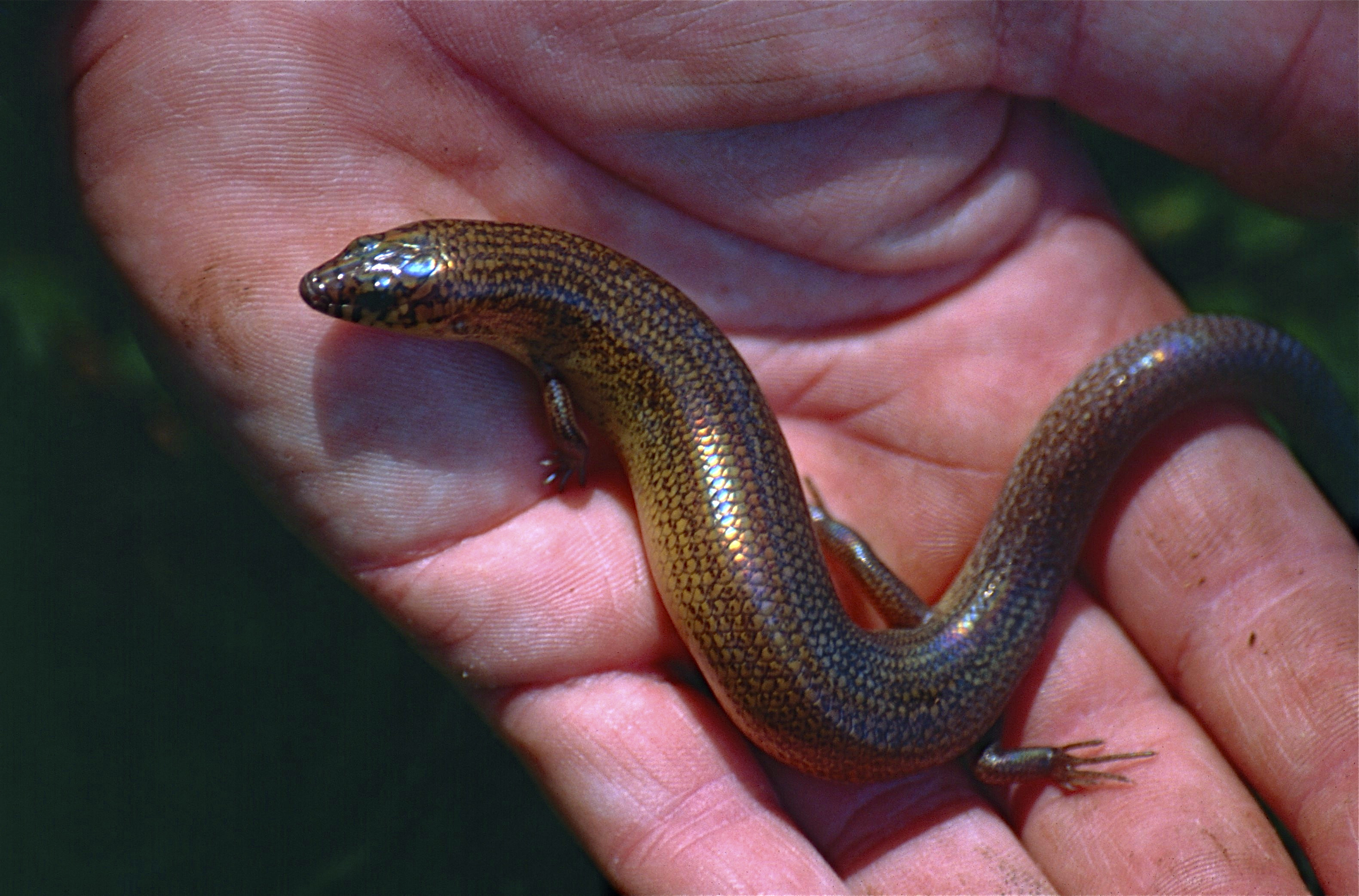

Conservation status
- Vulnerable (IUCN 3.1)

Scientific classification
- Domain: Eukaryota
- Kingdom: Animalia
- Phylum: Chordata
- Class: Reptilia
- Order: Squamata
- Family: Scincidae
- Genus: Brachyseps
- Species: B. anosyensis

Binomial name
- Brachyseps anosyensis Raxworthy & Nussbaum, 1993
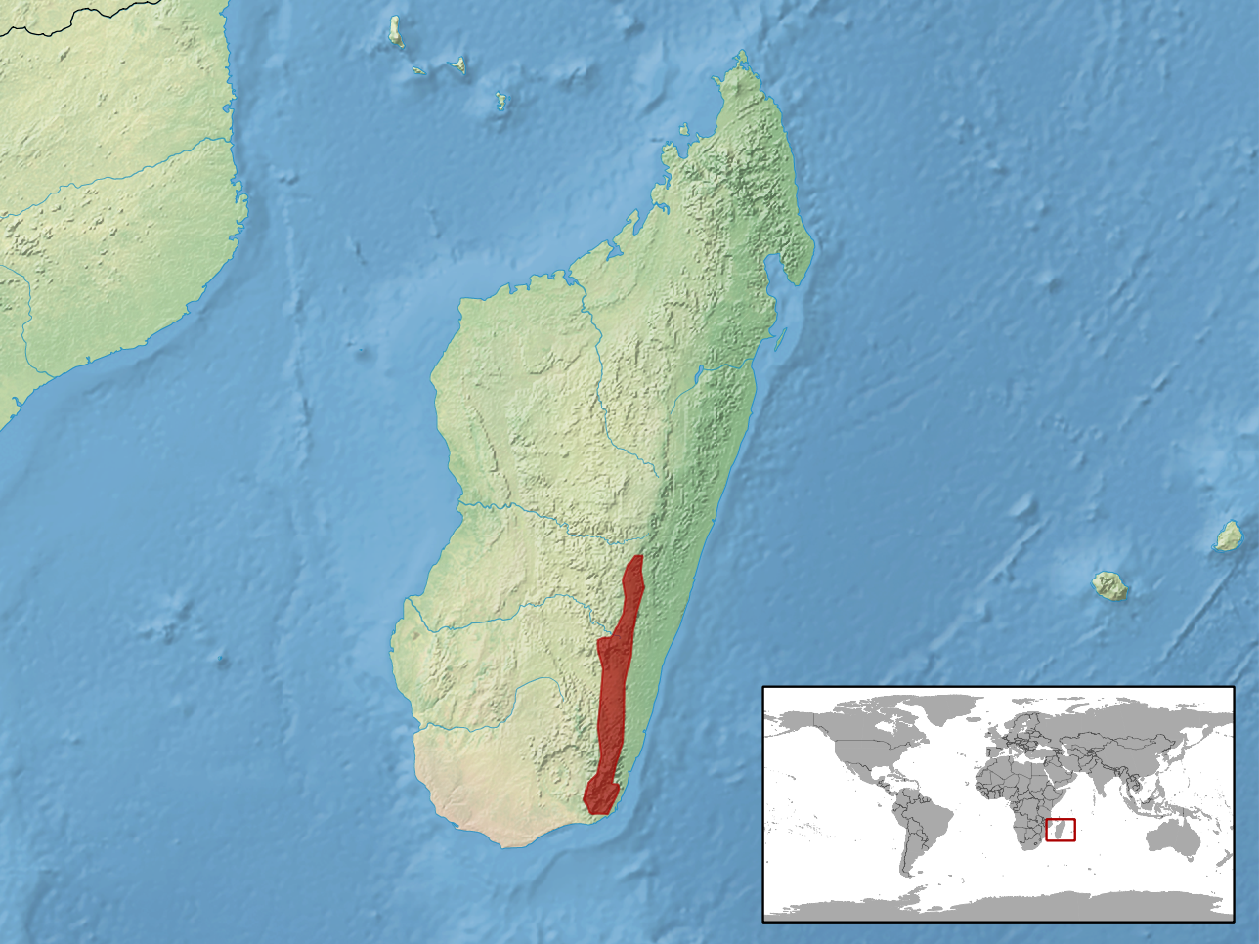

Synonyms
- Amphiglossus anosyensis

= Brachyseps anosyensis =

Species of lizard

Brachyseps anosyensis is a species of skink endemic to Madagascar.
