= Usambara dwarf gecko =

Conservation status
- Vulnerable (IUCN 3.1)

Scientific classification
- Kingdom: Animalia
- Phylum: Chordata
- Class: Reptilia
- Order: Squamata
- Suborder: Gekkota
- Family: Gekkonidae
- Genus: Lygodactylus
- Species: L. gravis

Binomial name
- Lygodactylus gravis Pasteur, 1965
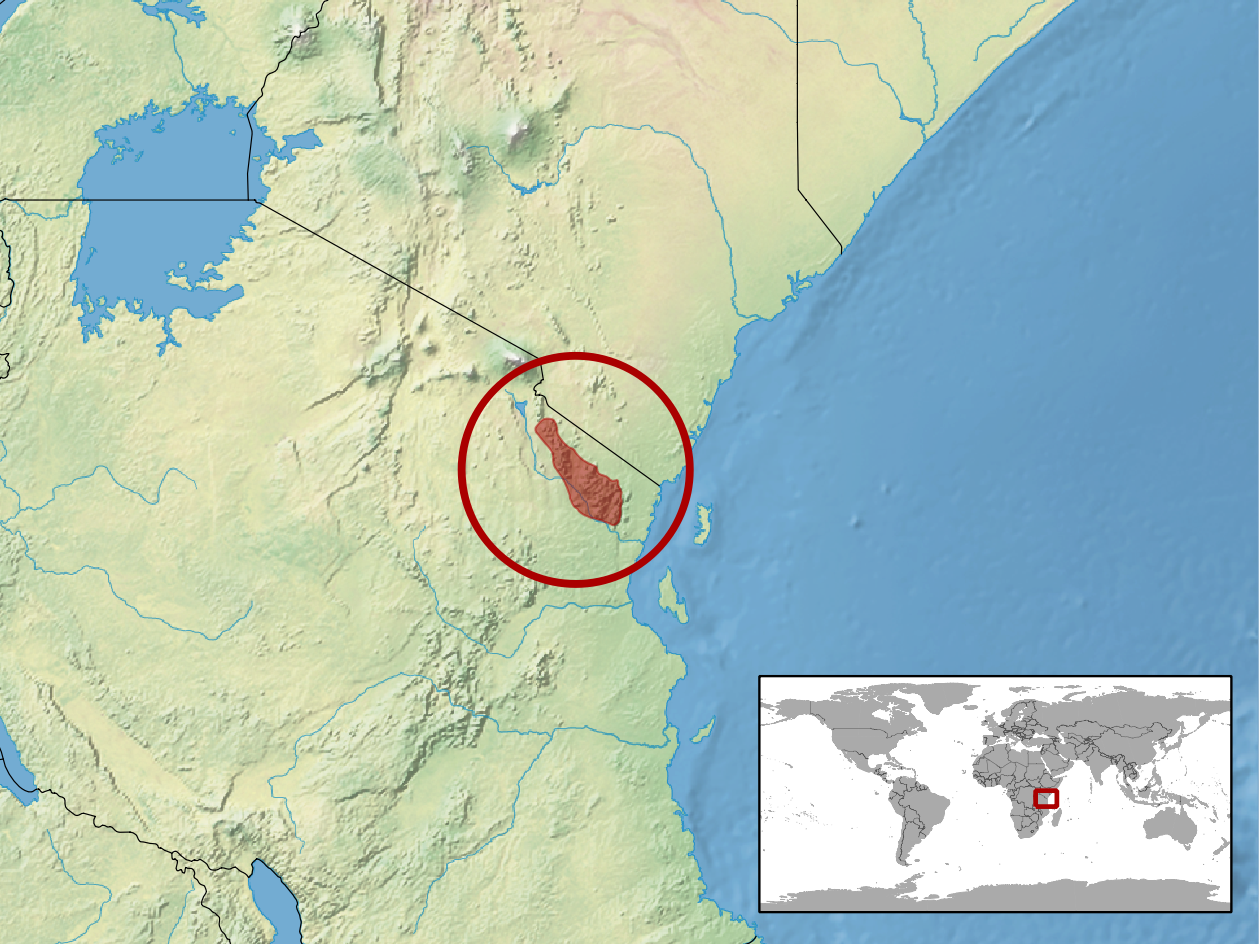

Species of lizard

The Usambara dwarf gecko (Lygodactylus gravis) is a species of gecko endemic to the Usambara Mountains in Tanzania.
