= Brachyseps splendidus =

Splendid skink

Conservation status
- Vulnerable (IUCN 3.1)

Scientific classification
- Domain: Eukaryota
- Kingdom: Animalia
- Phylum: Chordata
- Class: Reptilia
- Order: Squamata
- Family: Scincidae
- Genus: Brachyseps
- Species: B. splendidus

Binomial name
- Brachyseps splendidus (Grandidier, 1872)
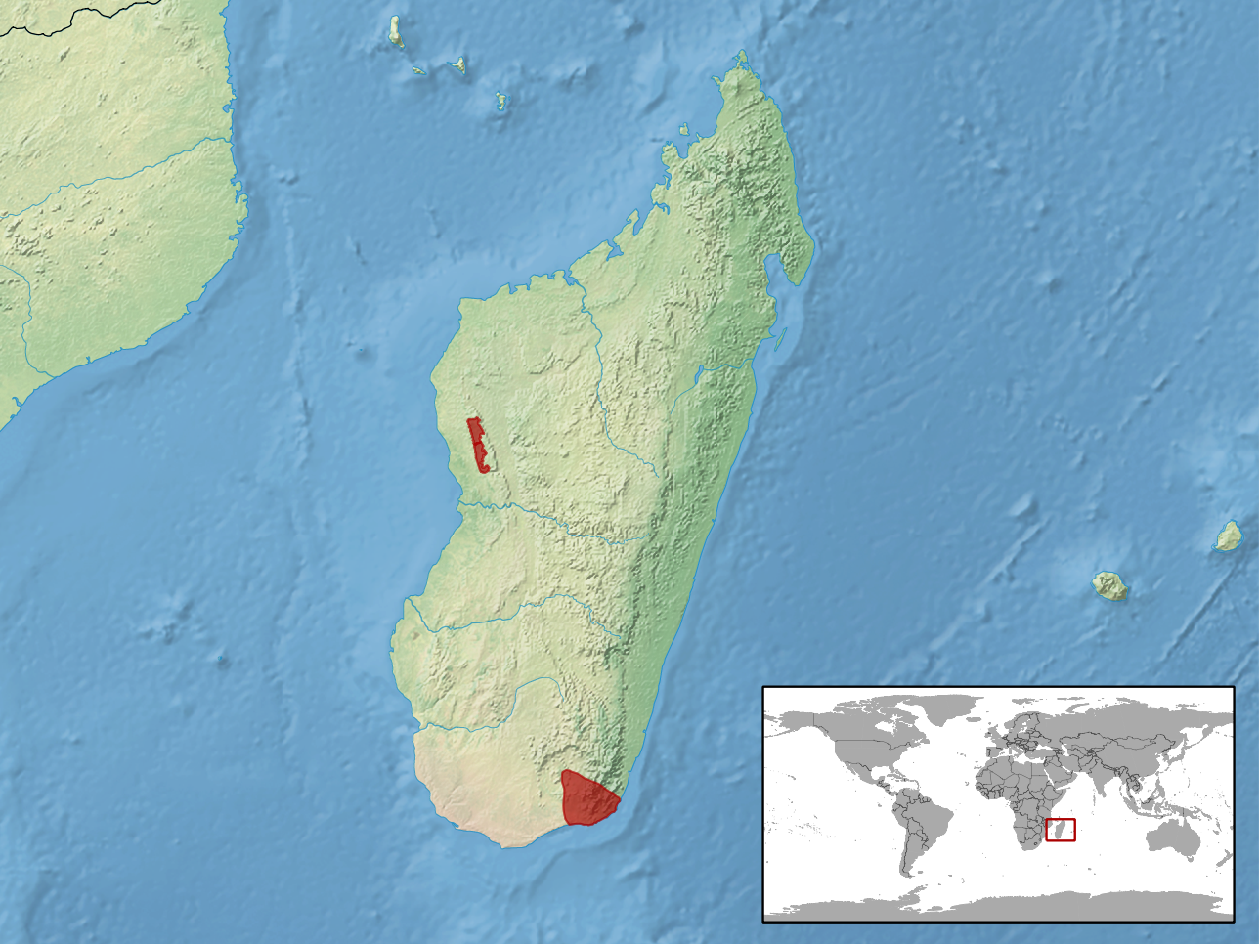

Synonyms
- Amphiglossus splendidus

Species of lizard

Brachyseps splendidus, the splendid skink, is a species of skink endemic to Madagascar.
