= Andinosaura laevis =

Conservation status
- Vulnerable (IUCN 3.1)

Scientific classification
- Kingdom: Animalia
- Phylum: Chordata
- Class: Reptilia
- Order: Squamata
- Family: Gymnophthalmidae
- Genus: Andinosaura
- Species: A. laevis

Binomial name
- Andinosaura laevis (Boulenger, 1908)

Synonyms
- Riama laevis

Species of lizard

Andinosaura laevis, the shiny lightbulb lizard, is a species of lizard in the family Gymnophthalmidae. It is endemic to Colombia.
