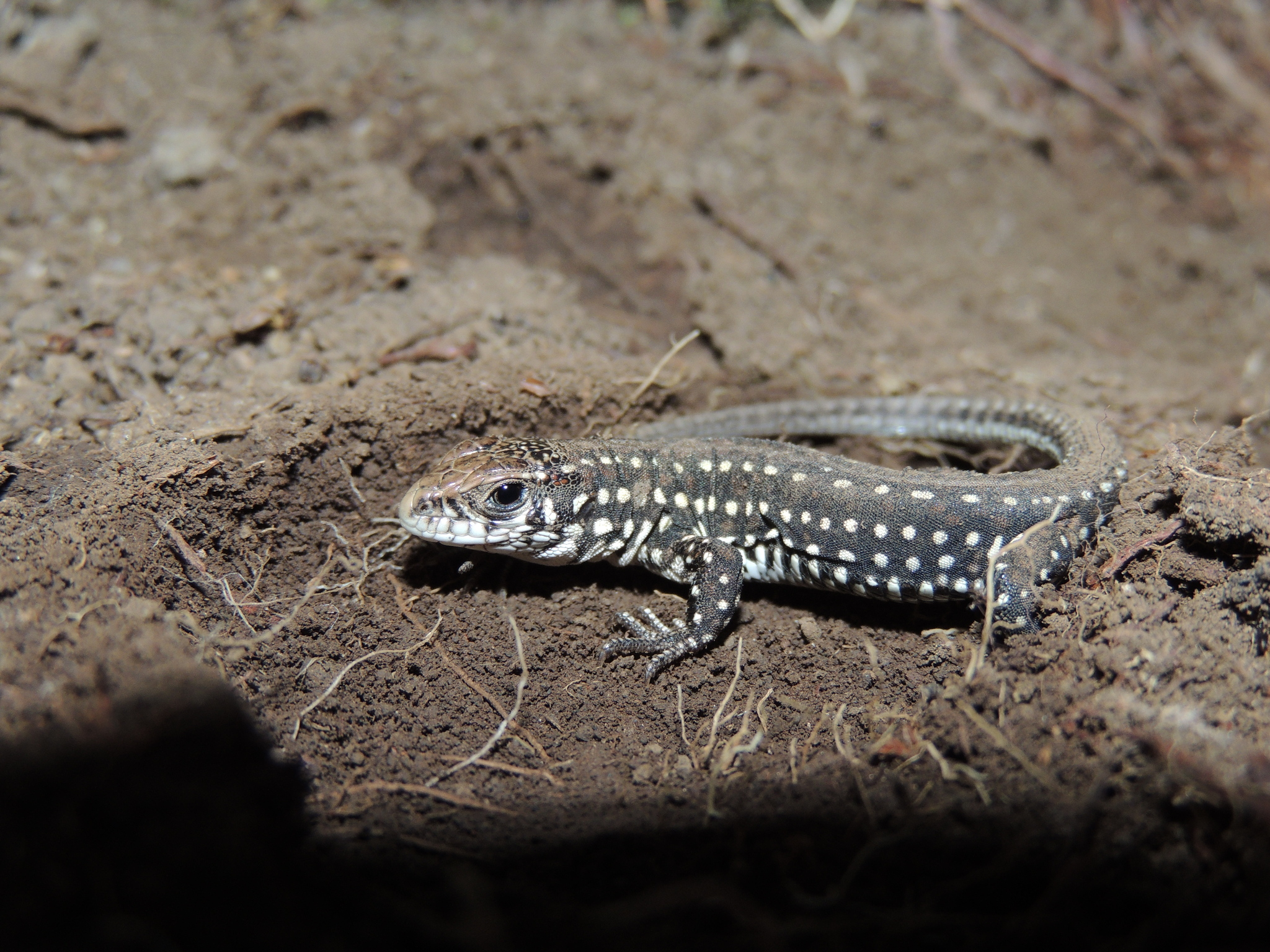

Conservation status
- Vulnerable (IUCN 3.1)

Scientific classification
- Kingdom: Animalia
- Phylum: Chordata
- Class: Reptilia
- Order: Squamata
- Family: Teiidae
- Genus: Contomastix
- Species: C. vacariensis

Binomial name
- Contomastix vacariensis (Feltrim & Lema, 2000)

Synonyms
- Cnemidophorus vacariensis Feltrim & Lema, 2000

= Contomastix vacariensis =

Species of lizard

Contomastix vacariensis is a species of teiid lizard endemic to Brazil.
