= Pico Duarte =

Mountain in the Dominican Republic

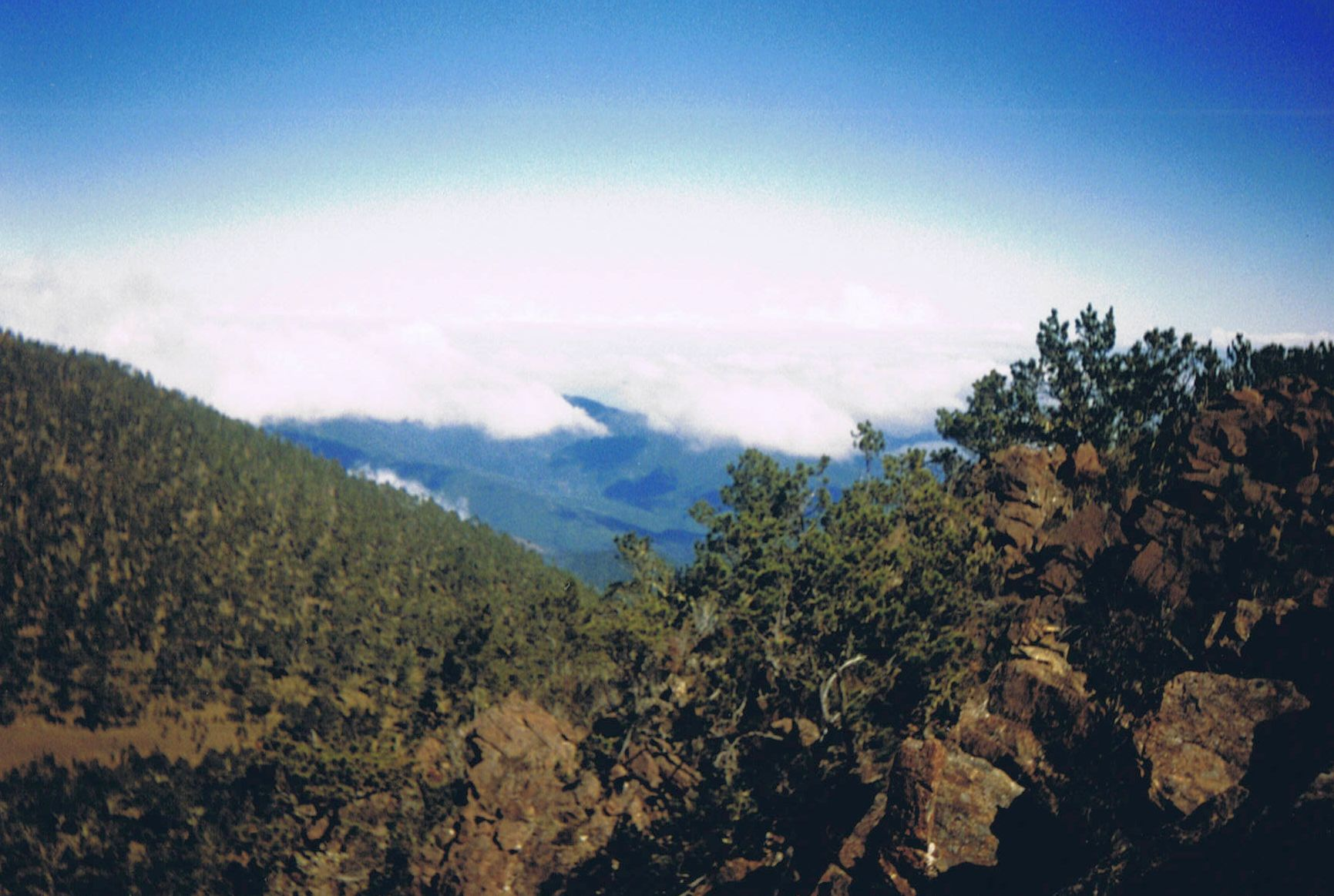
- View from La Pelona summit, 1996

Highest point
- Elevation: 3,101 m (10,174 ft)
- Prominence: 3,101 m (10,174 ft)
- Listing: Highest ocean islands 16th; World most prominent peaks 79th; North America prominent peak 14th; North America isolated peaks 9th; Caribbean high point; Country high point; Ribu
- Coordinates: 19°01′23″N 70°59′53″W

Geography
- Location within the Dominican Republic
- Location: Santiago Province, Dominican Republic
- Parent range: Cordillera Central

Climbing
- First ascent: 1851 by Robert H. Schomburgk
- Easiest route: Hike

Pico Duarte is the highest peak in the Dominican Republic, on the island of Hispaniola and in all the Caribbean. At 3,101 m (10,174 ft) above sea level, it gives Hispaniola the 16th-highest maximum elevation of any island in the world. Additionally, it is only 85 kilometres (53 miles) northeast of the region's lowest point, Lake Enriquillo, 46 m (151 ft) below sea level. It is part of the Cordillera Central range, which extends from the plains between San Cristóbal and Baní to the northwestern peninsula of Haiti, where it is known as the Massif du Nord. The highest elevations of the Cordillera Central are found in the Pico Duarte and Valle Nuevo massifs.

== History ==
The first reported climb was made in 1851 by a German who was British consul: Sir Robert Hermann Schomburgk. He named the mountain "Monte Tina" and estimated its height at 3,140 metres (10,300 ft). In 1912, Father Miguel Fuertes dismissed Schomburgk's calculations after climbing La Rucilla and judging it to be the tallest summit of the island. A year later, Swedish botanist Erik Leonard Ekman sided with Schomburgk's estimate, and called the sister summits "Pelona Grande" and "Pelona Chica" ("Big Bald One" and "Small Bald One", respectively). During the Rafael Trujillo Molina regime, the taller of the two was called "Pico Trujillo". After the dictator's death, it was renamed Pico Duarte, in honor of Juan Pablo Duarte, one of the Dominican Republic's founding fathers. At the summit is an east-facing bronze bust of Duarte atop a stone pedestal, next to a flagpole that flies the Dominican flag and a cross.

== Geography ==
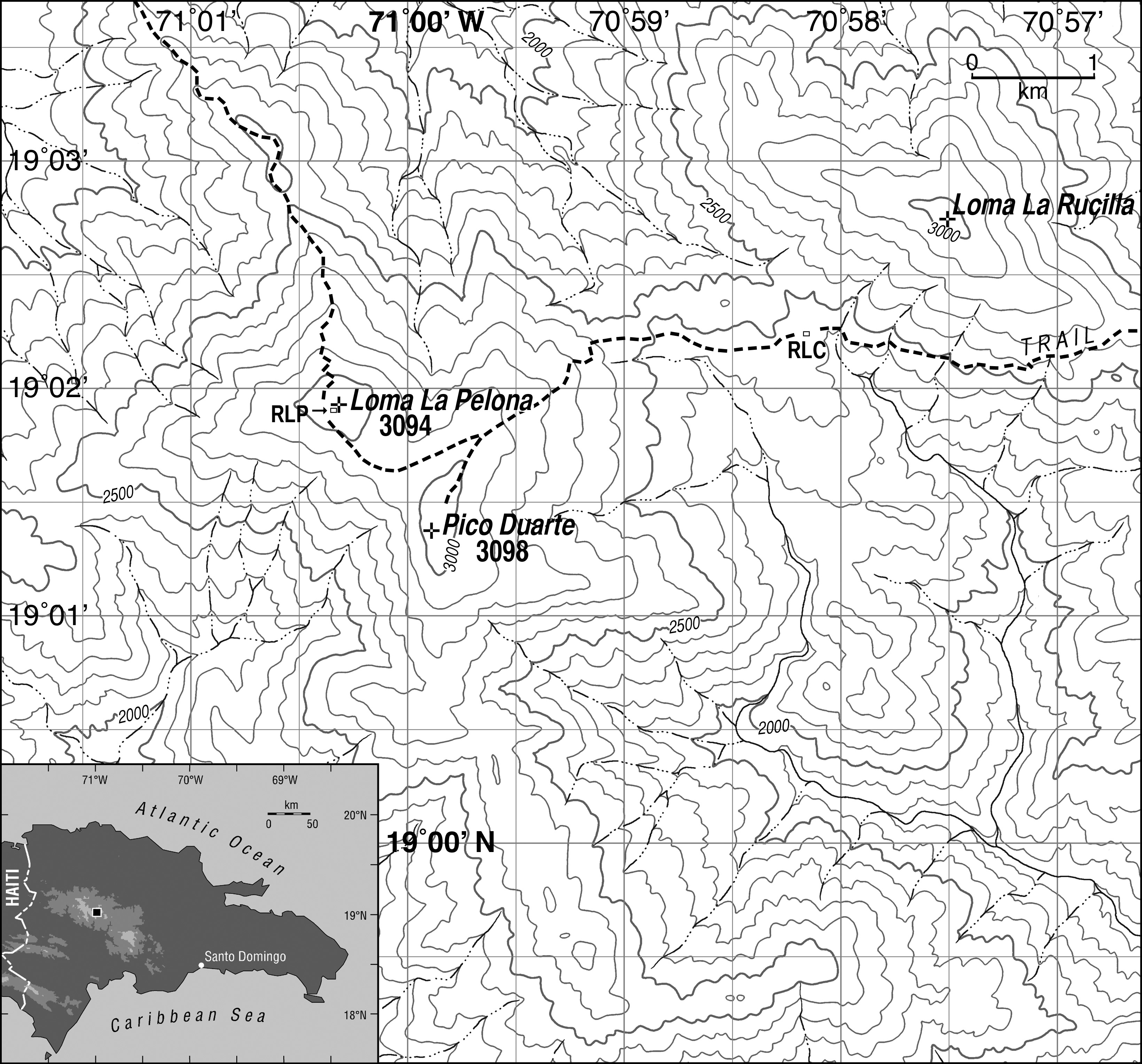
Topographical map of the Pico Duarte massif and its location in the Dominican Republic

The mountain's elevation was debated for decades, up until the mid-1990s, when it was still held to be 3,175 metres (10,417 ft) high. In 2003, it was measured by a researcher using GPS technology, and it was found to be 3,098 metres (10,164 ft) tall. The official elevation as recorded by Dominican government agencies is 3,087 metres (10,128 ft), a measurement that has been confirmed by several groups of hikers using personal GPS consoles (the most recent verified one in January 2005). In 2021 a team of researchers using GSSM technology found that its altitude is 3,101.1 metres (10,174 ft) with a margin of error of 0.3 metres (1 ft 0 in).

It is only a few meters taller than La Pelona, its twin, which stands at 3,097 metres (10,161 ft), and from which it is separated by a col between summits that is approximately 1.5 kilometres (0.93 mi) wide, and is officially named Valle del Baíto, but unofficially called Valle de Lilís. The col's mean elevation is 2,950 metres (9,680 ft).

== Ecology ==
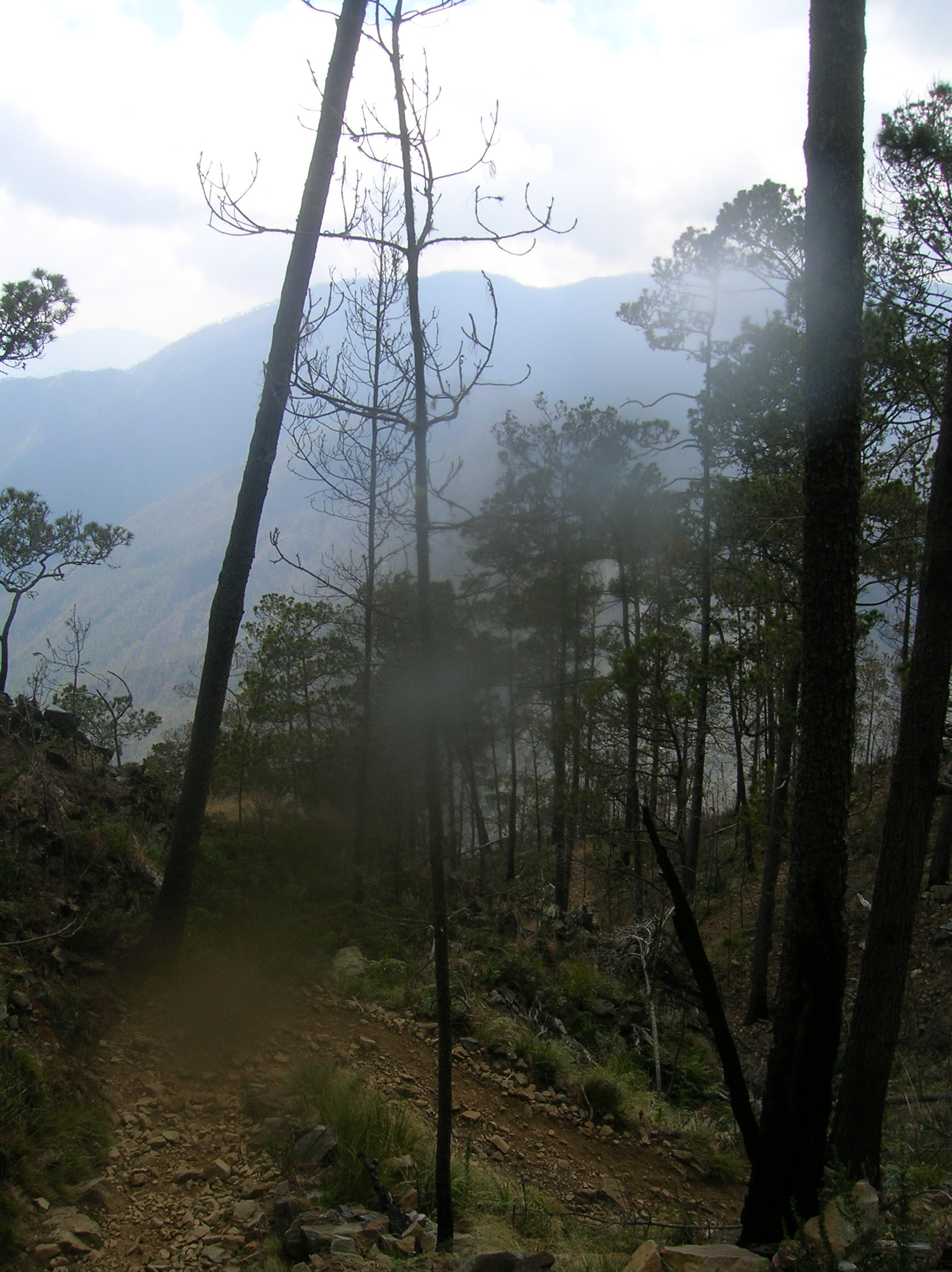
Approaching the peak of Pico Duarte.

The area has an oceanic climate that very few would associate as typical of a Caribbean island, with cool temperatures all year round, going several degrees below freezing during winter nights.

The mountain and the surrounding landscape are covered in pino de cuaba (Pinus occidentalis) forests. The pines frequently host the epiphytes guajaca (Tillandsia spp.) and the parasitic Dendropemon pycnophyllus. Some areas, like the Valle de Lilís, are treeless meadows of tussock-like pajones (Danthonia domingensis). The understory is composed of shrub such as Lyonia heptamera, Myrica picardae, Myrsine coriacea, Ilex tuerkheimii, Garrya fadyenii and Baccharis myrsinites. All of these species are adapted to the acidic soil of the area.

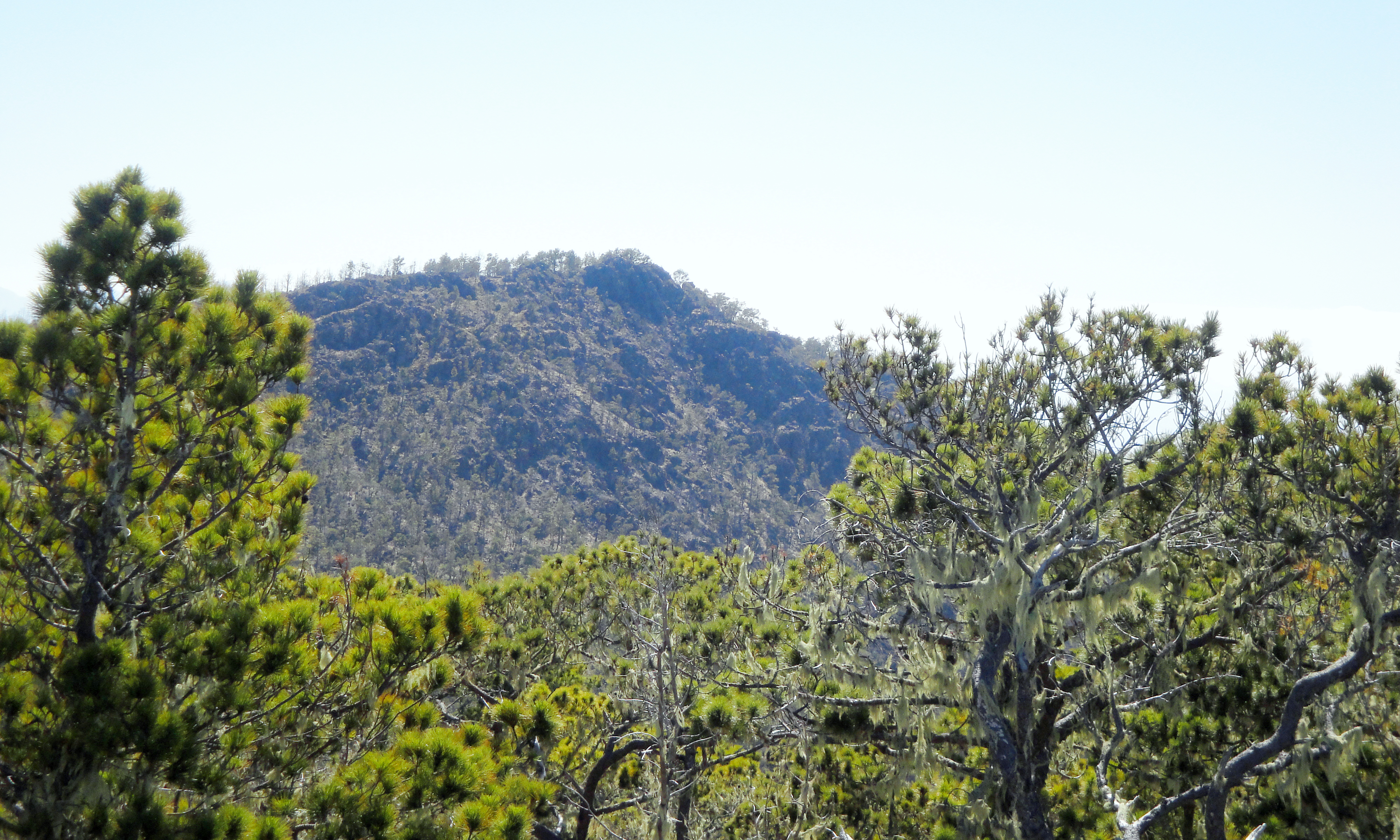
Hispaniolan pine forests on Pico Duarte

Reptiles in the area include the endemic Panolopus marcanoi. Birds seen in the area include the endemic Hispaniolan palm crow (Corvus palmarum palmarum), Antillean siskin (Carduelis dominicensis), rufous-throated solitaire (Myadestes genibarbis), Hispaniolan crossbill (Loxia megaplaga) (whose abundance is directly related to the Hispaniolan pine cone crop), and Hispaniolan trogon (Priotelus roseigaster); at lower elevations the Hispaniolan amazon (Amazona ventralis), scaly-naped pigeon (Patagioenas squamosa) and golden swallow (Tachycineta euchrysea) can be seen. There are two extant mammals endemic to Hispaniola whose remaining range includes the broadleaf forests of lower elevations: the primarily nocturnal Hispaniolan solenodon (Solenodon paradoxus) and the Hispaniolan hutia (Plagiodontia aedium). Both are rarely seen, with the latter considered Endangered. Wild boar, descendants of animals introduced to the island during the colonial period, have been reported.

A wildfire in 2003 altered the landscape of a large section of the eastern side of the mountain. As of 2008, the hillside of charred trees is now a new-growth forest. While thousands of charred trees are still standing, a large variety of indigenous grasses and small plants are now growing.

== Climbing information ==
There is a system of trails leading up to the summit, with trailheads at several locations (their final stretches to the summit are seen on the topographic map). The easiest access is from the town of La Ciénaga, near Jarabacoa. The trail is 23.1 km (14.4 mi) to the summit, with a total elevation change of 1,977 metres (6,486 ft), and a shelter 5 kilometres (3.1 mi) away from the summit at La Comparticion. Tourist-friendly travel agencies can help arrange trips from this trailhead, using mules in their employ to help lug food, sleeping bags and supplies for the overnight stay in the shelter.

A few fresh water springs labeled "potable" are along the trail, but water filters or purifying tablets are recommended. The majority of hikers travel by this route.

A trailhead northwest of the town of San Juan de la Maguana is the starting point for four-day (three-night) trips that end at the Ciénaga trailhead (or, for an extra day of hiking, back at the starting location), which are run entirely by local Dominicans who cook the food provided, and help campers along the way. Each night is spent in shelters, and due to the distance traveled, riding by mule-back is strongly encouraged. Far off the beaten path, it is highly unlikely that anyone else can be seen on the trail until the merge with the trail from La Ciénaga.

According to Dominican Park Service representatives in La Cienaga, while approximately 1,000 hikers visit Pico Duarte during each of the months of December and January; only about 10 to 15 people a day hike the mountain during off-season months.

== See also ==
- Geography of the Dominican Republic
- Hispaniola
