= Geography of the Dominican Republic =

Geography of Dominican Republic
- Continent: North America
- Region: Caribbean; Greater Antilles
- Coordinates: 19°0′N 70°40′W
- Area: Ranked 131st
  - Total: 48,670 km^{2} (18,790 sq mi)
  - Land: 99.2%
  - Water: 0.8%
- Coastline: 1,288 km (800 mi)
- Borders: Total land borders: 275 km
- Highest point: Pico Duarte; 3,098 m
- Lowest point: Lake Enriquillo -46 m
- Longest river: Yaque del Norte River
- Largest lake: Lake Enriquillo
- Exclusive economic zone: 255,898 km^{2} (98,803 mi^{2})

The Dominican Republic (Spanish: República Dominicana) is a country in the West Indies that occupies the eastern five-eighths of Hispaniola. It has an area of 48,670 km^{2} (18,790 sq mi), including offshore islands. The land border shared with Haiti, which occupies the western three-eighths of the island, is 376 km long. The maximum length, east to west, is 390 km from Punta de Agua to Las Lajas, on the border with Haiti. The maximum width, north to south, is 265 km from Cape Isabela to Cape Beata. The capital, Santo Domingo, is located on the south coast.

The Dominican Republic's shores are washed by the Atlantic Ocean to the north and the Caribbean Sea to the south. The Mona Passage, a channel about 130 km wide, separates the country (and Hispaniola) from Puerto Rico.

== Physical features ==
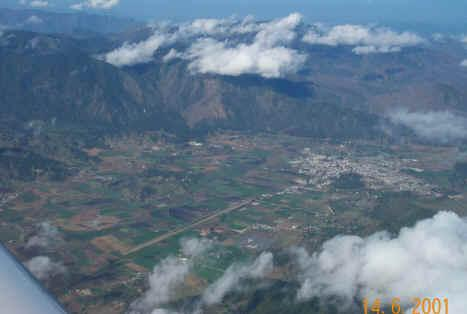
Cordillera Central

The Dominican Republic is a country with many mountains, and the highest peaks of the West Indies are found here. The chains of mountains show a direction northwest–southeast, except in the Southern peninsula (in Haiti) where they have a direction west–east. The mountains are separated by valleys with the same general direction.

From north to south, the mountain ranges and valleys are:

- Cordillera Septentrional (in English, "Northern Range"). It runs parallel to the north coast, with extensions to the northwest, the Tortuga Island, and to the southeast, the Samaná Peninsula (with its Sierra de Samaná). Its highest mountain is Diego de Ocampo, close to Santiago, with 1,249 m. There are several small plains between this range and the Atlantic Ocean. Rivers are short and most of them flow to the north.
- The Cibao Valley (Dominican Republic) is the largest and the most important valley of the country. This long valley stretches from North Haiti, where is called Plaine du Nord, to Samaná Bay. It can be divided in two sections: the northwestern part is the Yaque del Norte Valley (or Línea Noroeste) and the eastern Yuna Valley (or Vega Real, English: Royal Valley). The Vega Real is the most fertile area in the country, with a high population density.
- The Cordillera Central (also called Sierra del Cibao) is the island's most rugged and imposing feature and is known in Haiti as the Massif du Nord ("Northern Massif"). The highest mountains of the West Indies are in this range: Pico Duarte, 3,098 m, and others above 3,000 m. Near the center of the island, this range turns southward and is called Sierra de Ocoa, finishing near the city of Azua de Compostela, on the Caribbean coast. Another branch, Cordillera Oriental or Sierra del Seibo, is separated from the main chain by a karstic region (Los Haitises) and with a west–east direction; it is located south of Samaná Bay.

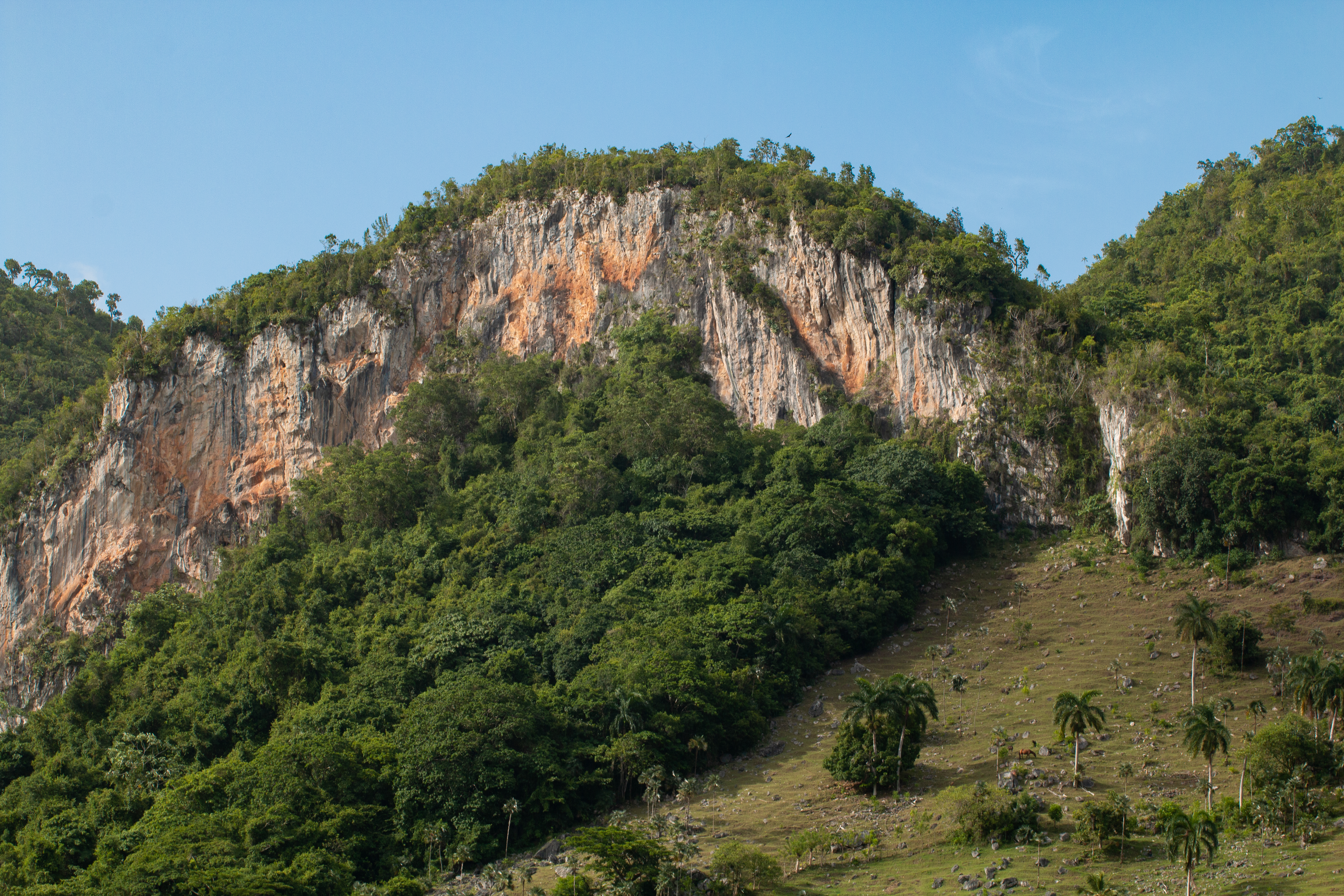
Cordillera Oriental landscape in Dominican Republic

- The San Juan Valley and Plain of Azua are big valleys south of the Cordillera Central with altitude from 0 to 600 m.
- The Sierra de Neiba, with Mount Neiba the highest mountain with 2,279 m. An extension to the southeast of Sierra de Neiba is the Sierra Martín García (Loma Busú, 1,350 m).
- The Hoya de Enriquillo or Neiba Valley is a remarkable valley, with a west–east direction, of low altitude (on average 50 m with some points below sea level) and with a great salt lake: the Enriquillo Lake.
- The Sierra de Bahoruco, called Massif de la Selle in Haiti. This southern group of mountains have a geology very different from the rest of the island.
- Llano Costero del Caribe (in English, "Caribbean Coastal Plain") is in the southeast of the island (and of the Dominican Republic). It is a large savanna east of Santo Domingo.

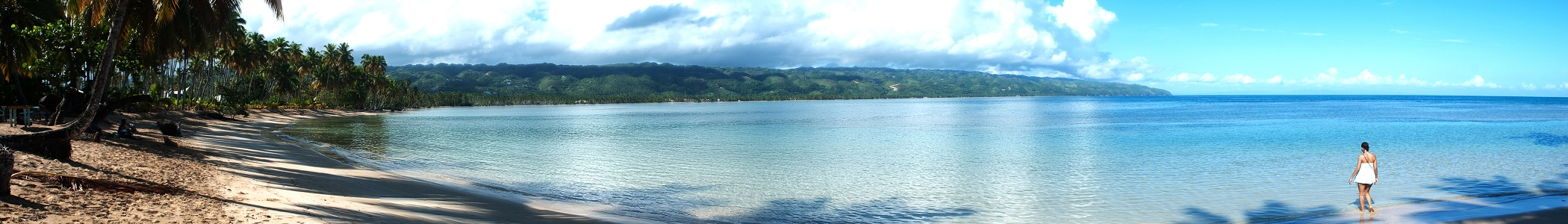
A beach in the Samana province

== Climate ==
Köppen climate types of the Dominican Republic

The Dominican Republic is a tropical, maritime nation. Owing to its diverse mountainous topography, the country's climate shows considerable variation for its size, and has the most diverse climate zones of all the Caribbean islands, including subtropical highland climates (Cwb), oceanic climates (Cfb) and hot semi-arid climates (BSh) along the usual tropical savanna (Aw), monsoon (Am), and rainforest (Af) climates typical of a Caribbean nation. Conditions are ameliorated in many areas by elevation and by the northeast trade winds, which blow steadily from the Atlantic all year long. The annual mean temperature is 25 °C (77 °F); regional mean temperatures range from 18 °C (64.4 °F) in the heart of the Cordillera Central (Constanza) to as high as 27 °C (80.6 °F) in arid regions. Temperatures rarely rise above 32 °C (89.6 °F), and freezing temperatures only occur in winter in the highest mountains. The average temperature in Santo Domingo in January is 24 °C (75.2 °F), and 27 °C (80.6 °F) in July.

The rain season for the northern coast is from November to January. For the rest of the country, the rain season is from May to November. The average annual rainfall is 1,346 mm (53.0 in), with extremes of 2,500 mm (98.4 in) or more in the mountainous northeast (the windward side of the island) and 500 mm (19.7 in) in the southwestern valleys. The western valleys, along the Haitian border, remain relatively dry, with less than 760 mm (29.9 in) of annual precipitation, due to the rain shadow effect caused by the central and northern mountain ranges. The northwestern and southeastern extremes of the country are also arid.

The Dominican Republic is occasionally damaged by tropical storms and hurricanes, which originate in the mid-Atlantic and southeastern Caribbean from June until November (mainly from August to October) each year.

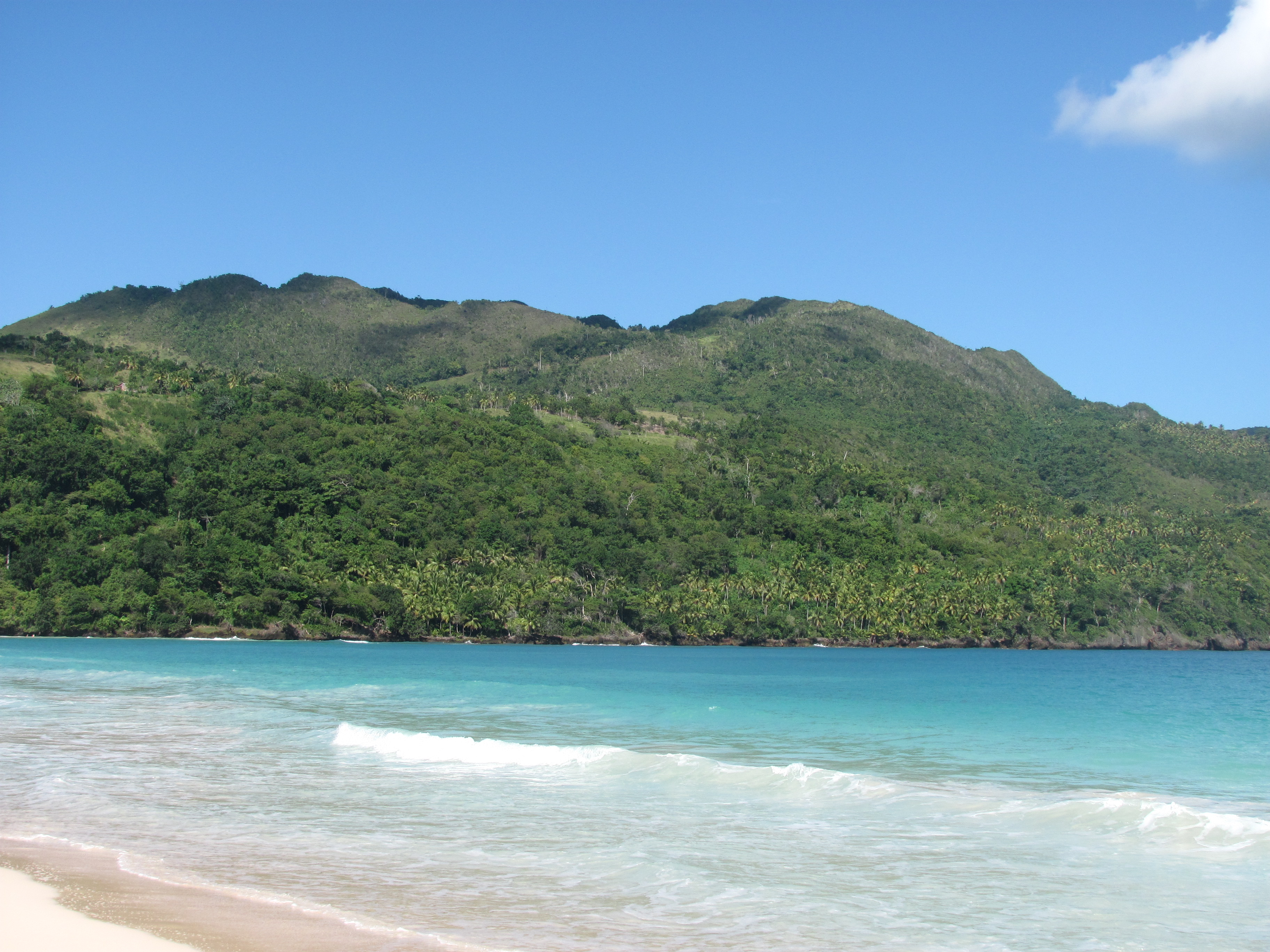
Tropical rainforest climate in Samana

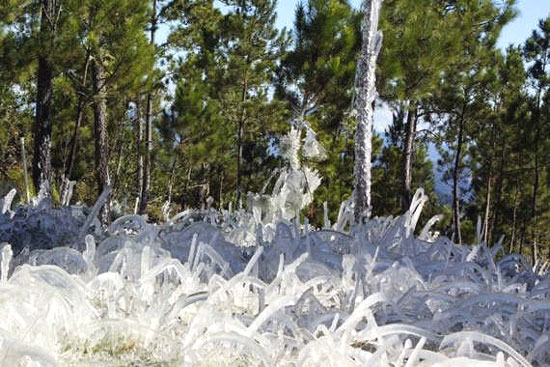
Frosted alpine forest in Constanza

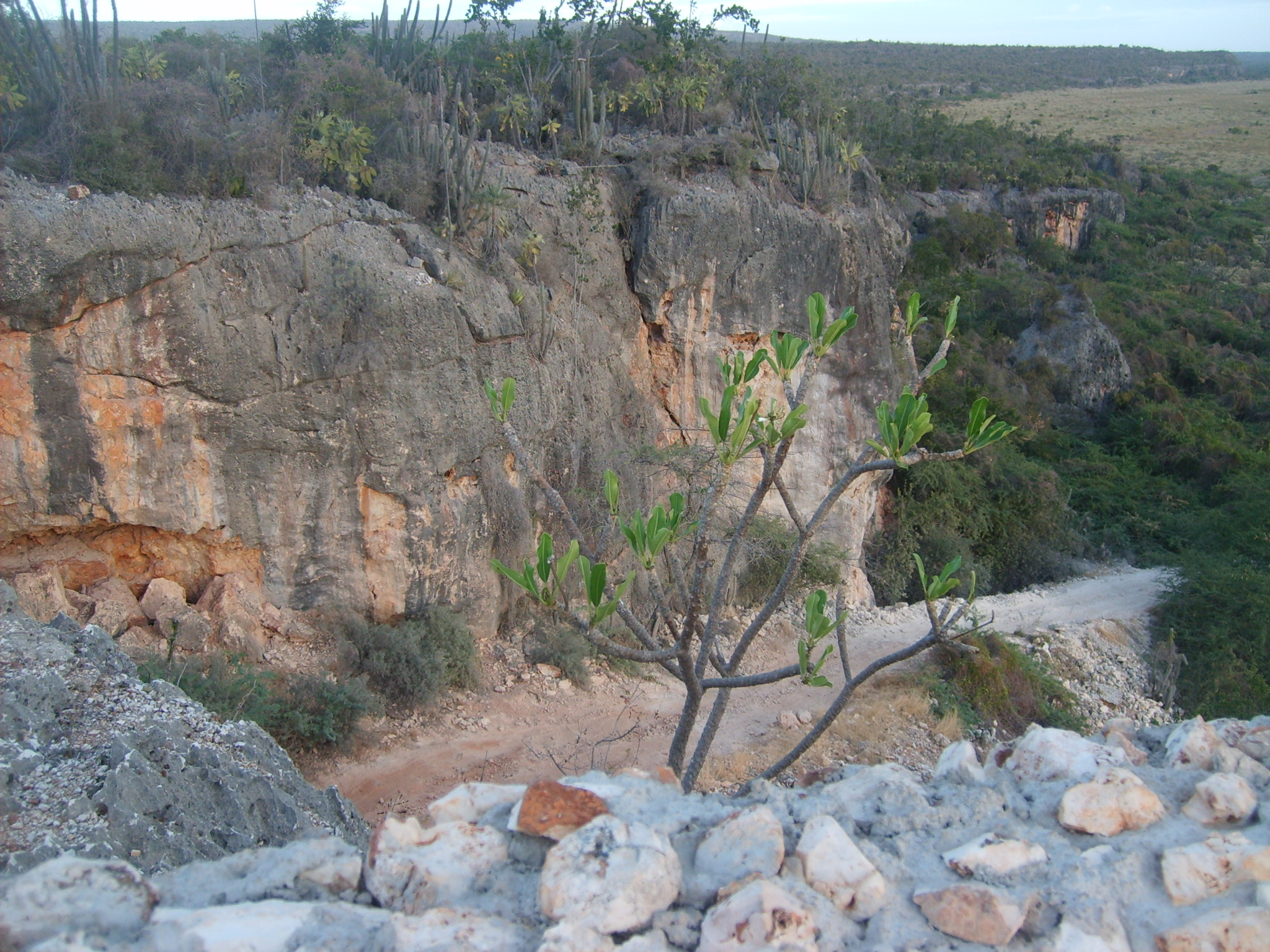
Semi-arid climate in Pedernales

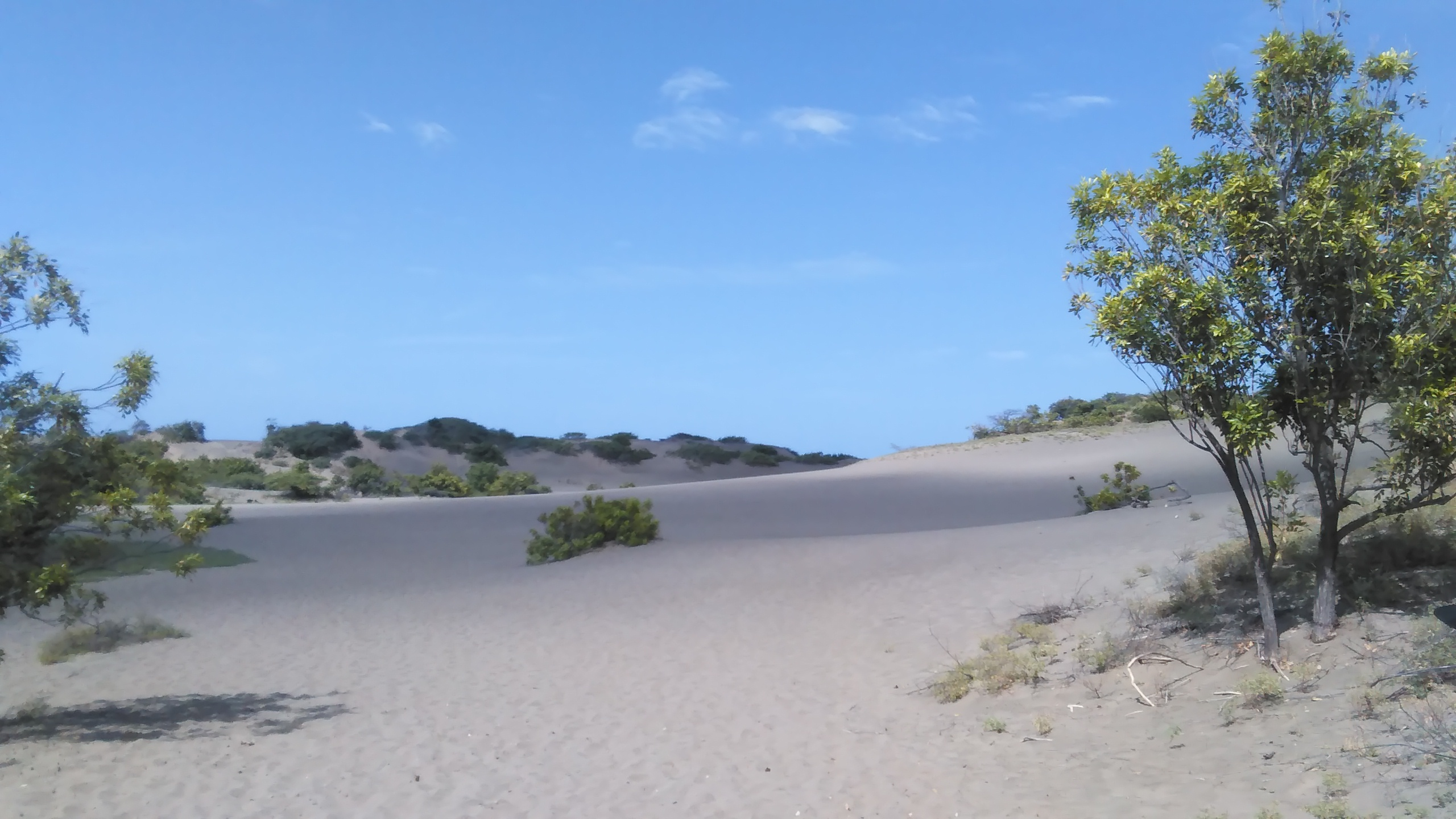
Desert sand dunes of Bani

== Islands ==
Caribbean maritime boundaries

There are several smaller islands and cays that are part of Dominican territory. The largest islands are:

1. Saona, close to the southeastern coast of Hispaniola, in the Caribbean Sea. It has an area of 117 km^{2}. Its Taíno name was Iai or Adamanay. Columbus named this island as Savona, after the Italian city of the same name, but the use during years has eliminated the letter v.
2. Beata, also on the southern coast. It has an area of 27 km^{2}. Its Taíno name is unknown. Columbus named this island Madama Beata.
3. Catalina, very close to the southeastern coast. It has an area of 9.6 km^{2}. Its Taíno name was Iabanea but some writers, including poets, say that it was called Toeya or Toella.

== Rivers and lakes ==
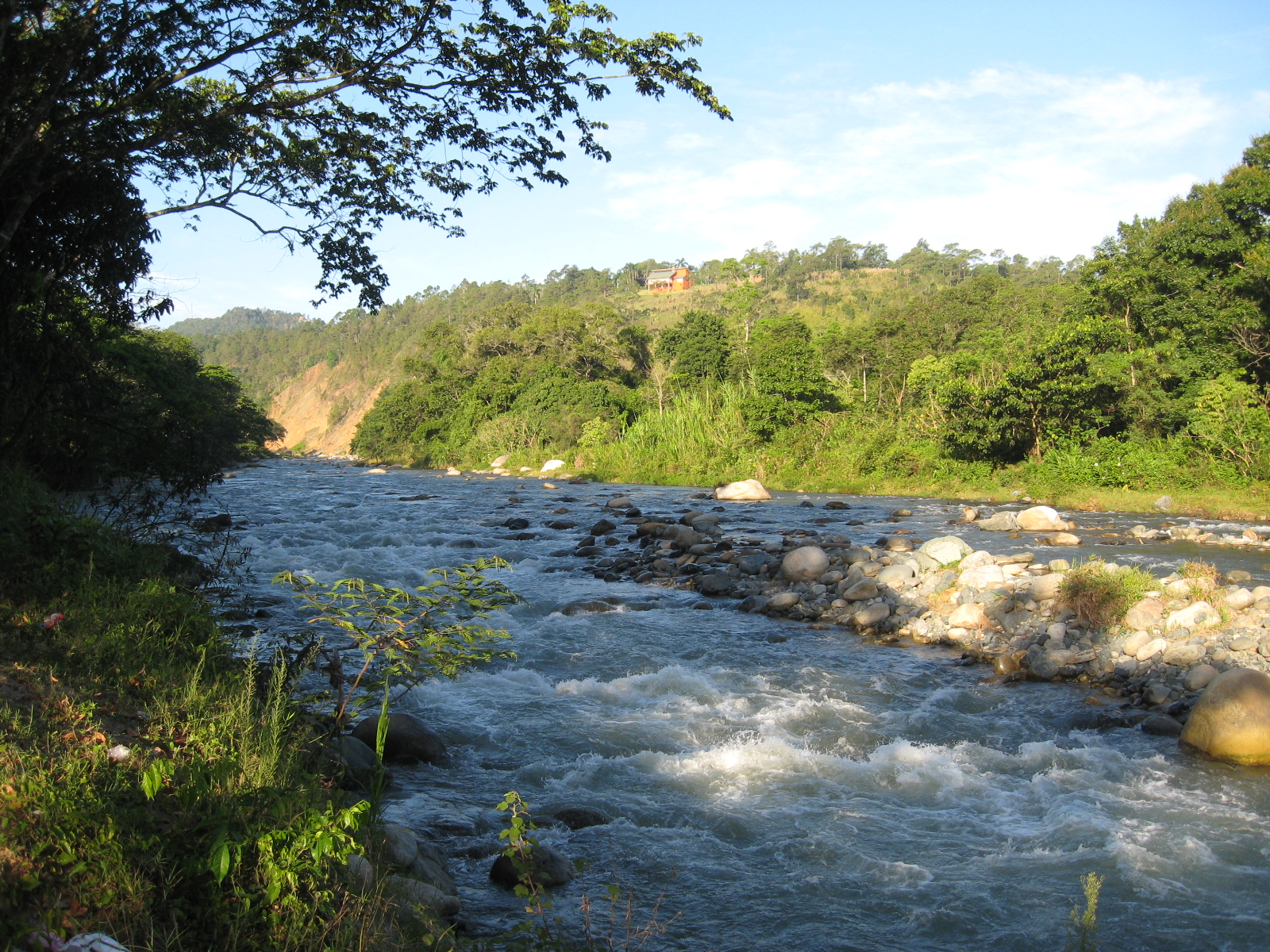
Yaque del Norte river

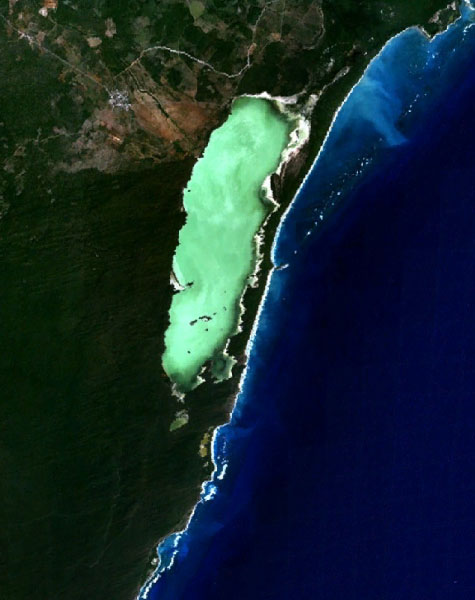
Oviedo Lake in Pedernales

The 8 longest rivers of the Dominican Republic are:

1. Yaque del Norte. At 296 km, it is the longest river in the Dominican Republic. Its sources are in the Cordillera Central and flows to the Atlantic Ocean. Its watershed has an area of 7,044 km^{2}.
2. Yuna. It is 185 km long. Its sources are in the Cordillera Central and flows to the east into Samaná Bay. Its watershed has an area of 5,498 km^{2}.
3. Yaque del Sur. It is 183 km long and its sources are in the Cordillera Central. It flows to the south into the Caribbean Sea. Its watershed has an area of 4,972 km^{2}.
4. Ozama. It is 148 km long. Its sources are in Sierra de Yamasá (a branch of the Cordillera Central). It flows into the Caribbean Sea. Its watershed has an area of 2,685 km^{2}.
5. Camú. It is 137 km long. Its sources are in the Cordillera Central and flows into the Yuna River. Its watershed has 2,655 km^{2}.
6. Nizao. It is 133 km long. Its sources are in the Cordillera Central and flows to the south into the Caribbean Sea. Its watershed has an area of 974 km^{2}.
7. San Juan. It is 121 km long. Its sources are in the Cordillera Central and flows to the south into the Yaque del Sur River. Its watershed has an area of 2,005 km^{2}.
8. Mao. It is 105 km long. Its sources are in the Cordillera Central and flows to the north into the Yaque del Norte River. Its watershed has an area of 864 km^{2}.

The Artibonite River is the longest river of the island, but only 68 km flows through the Dominican Republic.

The largest lake of Hispaniola, and of the Caribbean, is Lake Enriquillo. It is located in the Hoya de Enriquillo with an area of 265 km^{2}. There are three small islands within the lake. It is around 40 meters below sea level, and is a hypersaline lake, with a higher concentration of salt than seawater.

Other lakes are Rincón (fresh water, area of 28.2 km^{2}), Oviedo (brackish water, area of 28 km^{2}), Redonda, and Limón.

== Tree cover extent and loss ==
Global Forest Watch publishes annual estimates of tree cover loss and 2000 tree cover extent derived from time-series analysis of Landsat satellite imagery in the Global Forest Change dataset. In this framework, tree cover refers to vegetation taller than 5 m (including natural forests and tree plantations), and tree cover loss is defined as the complete removal of tree cover canopy for a given year, regardless of cause.

For the Dominican Republic, country statistics report cumulative tree cover loss of 393,945 ha (3,939.45 km^{2}) from 2001 to 2024 (about 15.3% of its 2000 tree cover area). For tree cover density greater than 30%, country statistics report a 2000 tree cover extent of 2,576,438 ha (25,764.38 km^{2}). The charts and table below display this data. In simple terms, the annual loss number is the area where tree cover disappeared in that year, and the extent number shows what remains of the 2000 tree cover baseline after subtracting cumulative loss. Forest regrowth is not included in the dataset.

Annual tree cover loss in the Dominican Republic, 2001–2024. View chart definition.
Tree cover extent in 2000 minus cumulative tree cover loss in the Dominican Republic, 2001–2024 (loss-only residual; does not account for gain). View chart definition.

Annual tree cover extent and loss
| Year | Tree cover extent (km2) (Note: This residual measure does not include forest regrowth.) | Annual tree cover loss (km2) |
|---|---|---|
| 2001 | 25,651.91 | 112.47 |
| 2002 | 25,547.56 | 104.35 |
| 2003 | 25,440.42 | 107.14 |
| 2004 | 25,246.55 | 193.87 |
| 2005 | 24,995.67 | 250.88 |
| 2006 | 24,861.53 | 134.14 |
| 2007 | 24,700.94 | 160.59 |
| 2008 | 24,484.83 | 216.11 |
| 2009 | 24,345.15 | 139.68 |
| 2010 | 24,204.12 | 141.03 |
| 2011 | 24,074.52 | 129.60 |
| 2012 | 23,895.46 | 179.06 |
| 2013 | 23,768.43 | 127.03 |
| 2014 | 23,631.64 | 136.79 |
| 2015 | 23,480.73 | 150.91 |
| 2016 | 23,231.65 | 249.08 |
| 2017 | 22,961.02 | 270.63 |
| 2018 | 22,821.31 | 139.71 |
| 2019 | 22,672.00 | 149.31 |
| 2020 | 22,457.59 | 214.41 |
| 2021 | 22,315.78 | 141.81 |
| 2022 | 22,184.37 | 131.41 |
| 2023 | 21,954.89 | 229.48 |
| 2024 | 21,824.93 | 129.96 |

=== REDD+ reference levels and monitoring ===
Under the UNFCCC REDD+ framework, the Dominican Republic has submitted two national reference-level benchmarks. On the UNFCCC REDD+ Web Platform, both the 2020 and 2022 submissions are listed as having assessed reference levels, while the other Warsaw Framework elements—a national strategy, safeguards, and a national forest monitoring system—are listed as “not reported”.

The first assessed submission, technically assessed in 2021, was a national forest reference level (FRL) covering reducing emissions from deforestation, reducing emissions from forest degradation and enhancement of forest carbon stocks. Using a 2006–2015 reference period, the modified FRL was assessed at 2,200,494 t CO2 eq per year, revised downward from 6,534,106 t CO2 eq per year in the original submission. The technical assessment reported that this FRL included above-ground biomass, below-ground biomass, deadwood, litter and soil organic carbon, and reported CO2 only.

A second submission, technically assessed in 2022, was presented as a national forest reference emission level (FREL) and expanded coverage to all five REDD+ activities: reducing emissions from deforestation, reducing emissions from forest degradation, conservation of forest carbon stocks, sustainable management of forests, and enhancement of forest carbon stocks. Using a 2001–2015 reference period, the modified FREL was assessed at −7,979,584 t CO2 eq per year, compared with −14,819,265 t CO2 eq per year in the original submission. The technical assessment states that this second benchmark included above-ground biomass, below-ground biomass, deadwood, litter and soil organic carbon, and included CO2, methane (CH_{4}) and nitrous oxide (N_{2}O). It also noted that the 2022 benchmark differed from the earlier one mainly because it added conservation of forest carbon stocks and sustainable management of forests, changed the reference period, and aligned the methodology more closely with the national greenhouse-gas inventory.

== Statistics ==
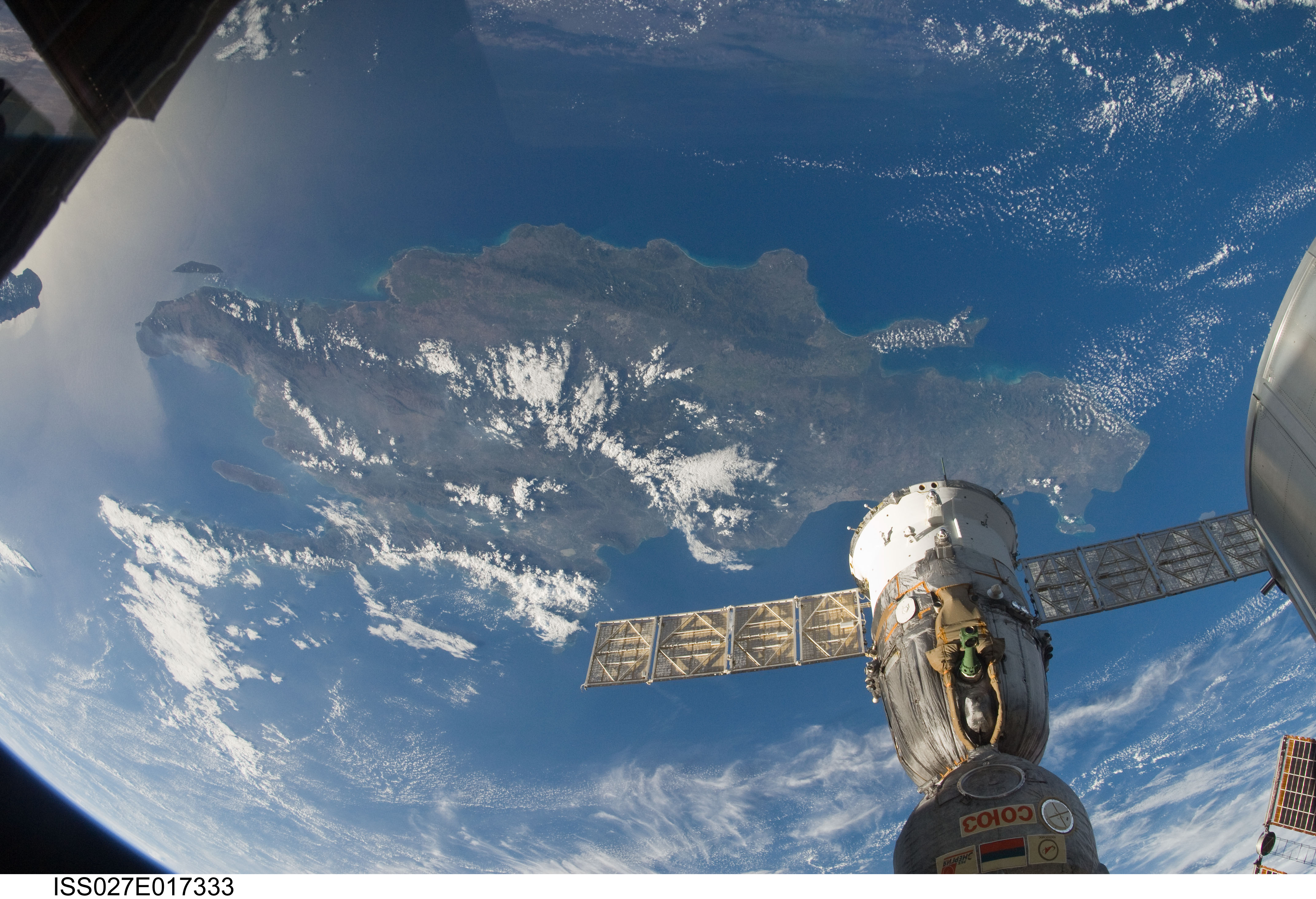
Satellite view of Dominican Republic

Location
Caribbean, it occupies five-eighths of the island of Hispaniola, between the Caribbean Sea and the North Atlantic Ocean, east of Haiti
Geographic coordinates
19°00′N 70°40′W
Area
- Total: 48,670 km²
- Land: 48,320 km²
- Water: 350 km²
Land boundaries
- Total: 376 km
- Border countries: Haiti 360 km (223.7 mi)
Coastline
1,288 km
Maritime claims
- Territorial sea: 6 nmi (11.1 km; 6.9 mi)
- Contiguous zone: 24 nmi (44.4 km; 27.6 mi)
- Exclusive economic zone: 255,898 km^{2} (98,803 mi^{2}) with 200 nmi (370.4 km; 230.2 mi)
- Continental shelf: 200 nmi (370.4 km; 230.2 mi) or to the edge of the continental margin
Climate
Tropical maritime; little seasonal temperature variation; seasonal variation in rainfall
Rivers
Significant rivers include the Jimani River, Río Yaque del Norte, Río Jamao del Norte, Río Isabela and the Ozama River

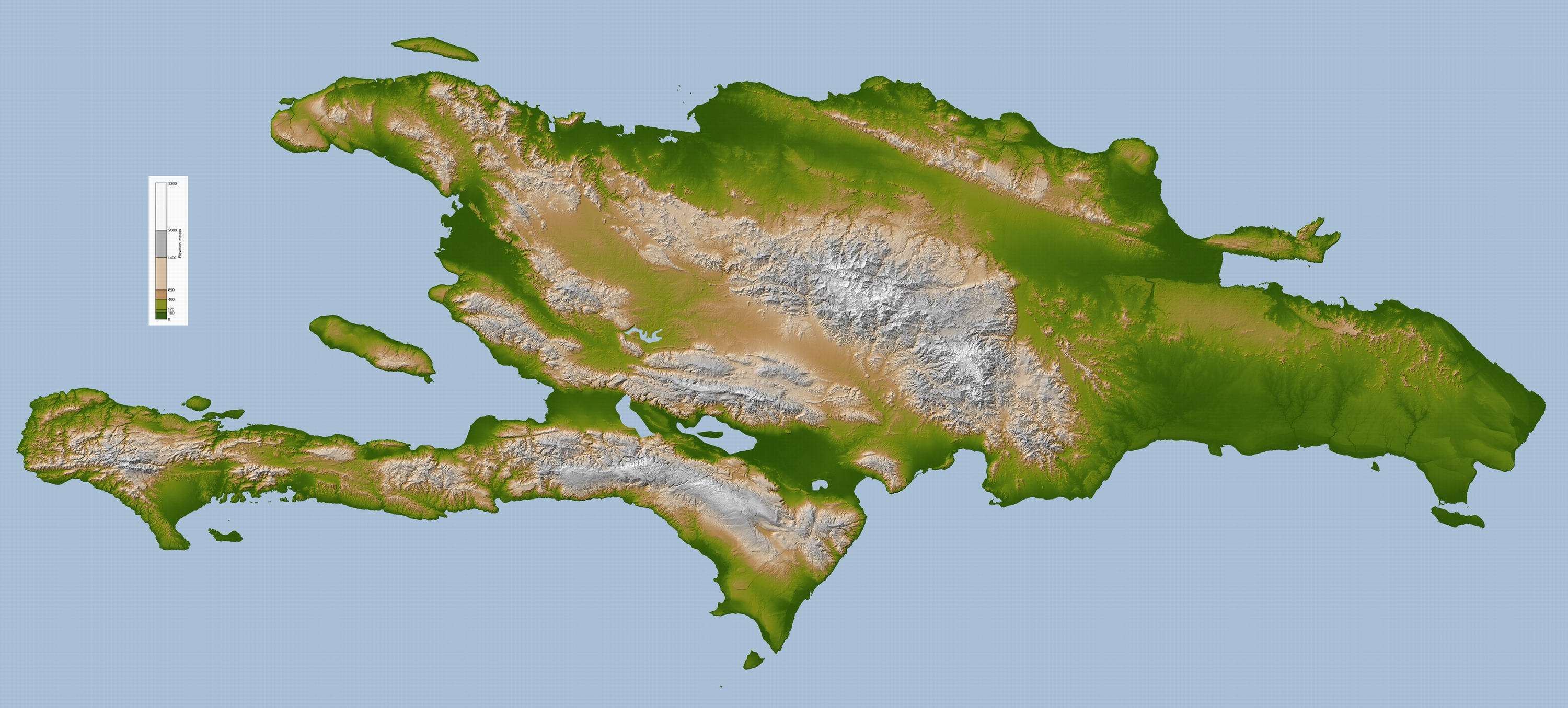
Topography map of Hispaniola

Terrain
Rugged highlands and mountains with fertile valleys interspersed
Geographical extremes
- Northernmost point – Cabo Isabela
- Southernmost point – Alto Velo Island, Jaragua National Park
- Southernmost point (mainland) – south of Oviedo, Pedernales in Jaragua National Park
- Westernmost point – Las Lajas, border with Haiti, Independencia Province
- Easternmost point – Punta de Agua, La Altagracia Province
Elevation extremes
- Lowest point – Lago Enriquillo: -46 m
- Highest point – Pico Duarte: 3,098 m
Natural resources
Nickel, bauxite, gold, silver
Land use
- Arable land: 16.56%
- Permanent crops: 10.35%
- Other: 73.10% (2012 est.)
Irrigated land
3,241 km² (2018)
Total renewable water resources
21 km^{3} (2011)
Freshwater withdrawal (domestic/industrial/agricultural)
- total: 5.47 km^{3}/yr (26%/1%/72%)
- per capita: 574.2 m^{3}/yr (2005)
Natural hazards
Lies in the middle of the hurricane belt and subject to severe storms from June to October; occasional flooding; periodic droughts
Environment - current issues
Water shortages; soil eroding into the sea damages coral reefs; deforestation; damage caused by Hurricane Georges
Environment - international agreements
- Party to: Biodiversity, Climate Change, Desertification, Endangered Species, Marine Dumping, Marine Life Conservation, Nuclear Test Ban, Ozone Layer Protection, Ship Pollution, Wetlands
- Signed, but not ratified: Law of the Sea
Geography - note
Shares island of Hispaniola with Haiti (eastern five-eighths is the Dominican Republic, western three-eighths is Haiti)
