= Anolis fowleri =

Conservation status
- Endangered (IUCN 3.1)

Scientific classification
- Kingdom: Animalia
- Phylum: Chordata
- Class: Reptilia
- Order: Squamata
- Suborder: Iguania
- Family: Dactyloidae
- Genus: Anolis
- Species: A. fowleri

Binomial name
- Anolis fowleri Schwartz, 1973

Synonyms
- Anolis fowleri Schwartz, 1973; Chamaelinorops fowleri — Nicholson et al., 2012

Species of lizard

Anolis fowleri, also known commonly as Fowler's anole and the green-banded anole, is a rare species of lizard in the family Dactyloidae. The species is endemic to the Dominican Republic.

== Etymology ==
The specific name, fowleri, is in honor of American herpetologist Danny C. Fowler.

== Geographic range ==
A. fowleri is found in the Cordillera Central, Dominican Republic.

== Habitat ==
The preferred natural habitat of A. fowleri is forest, at altitudes of 1,585–1,770 m (5,200–5,807 ft).

== Description ==
A. fowleri is moderate-sized for the genus Anolis. Adults may attain a snout-to-vent length (SVL) of 7.5 cm (3.0 in). The body coloration is a camouflage pattern of brown, tan, green, and gray.

== Reproduction ==
A. fowleri is oviparous.
