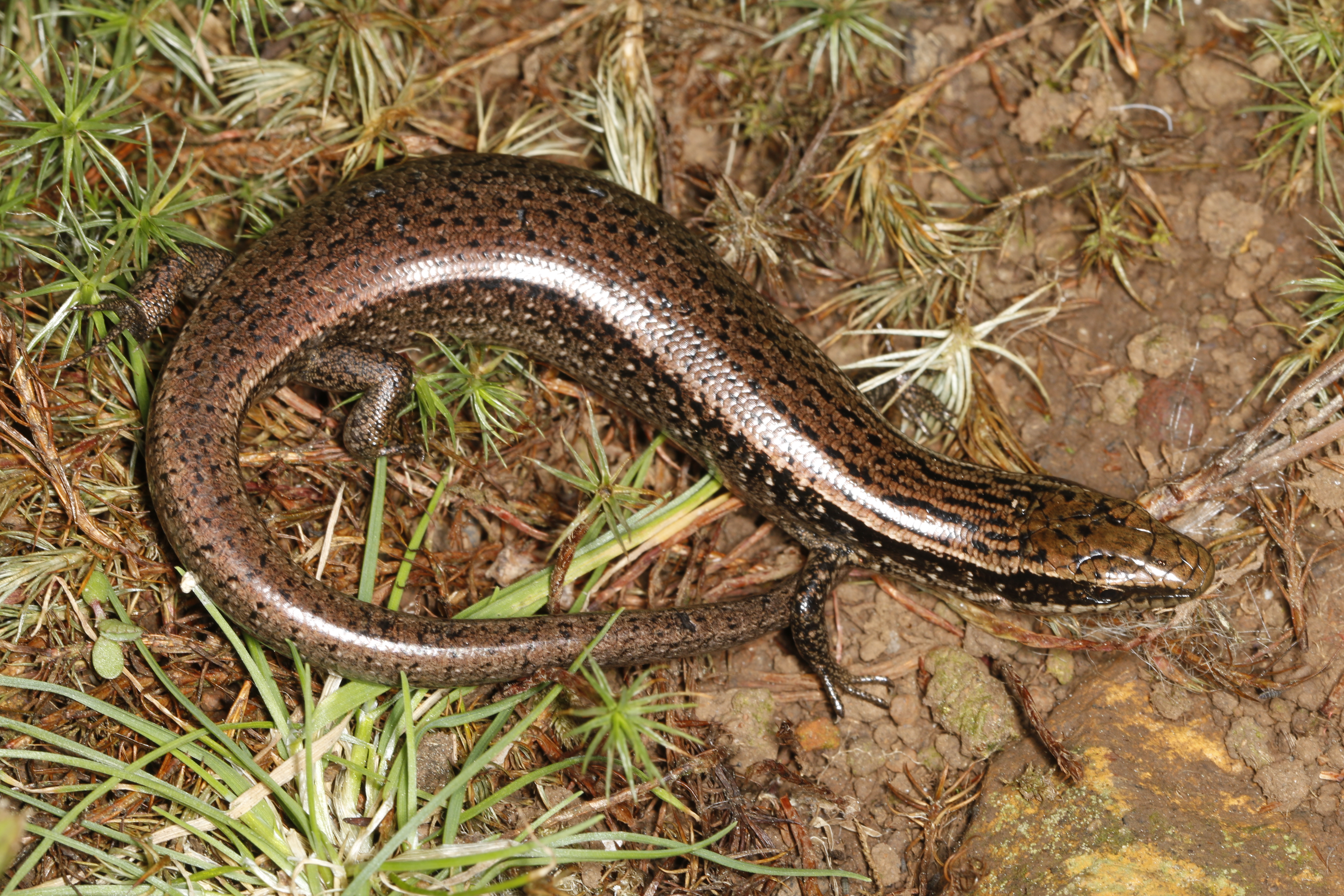

Conservation status
- Least Concern (IUCN 3.1)

Scientific classification
- Kingdom: Animalia
- Phylum: Chordata
- Class: Reptilia
- Order: Squamata
- Suborder: Anguimorpha
- Family: Diploglossidae
- Genus: Panolopus
- Species: P. marcanoi

Binomial name
- Panolopus marcanoi (Schwartz & Incháustegui, 1976)
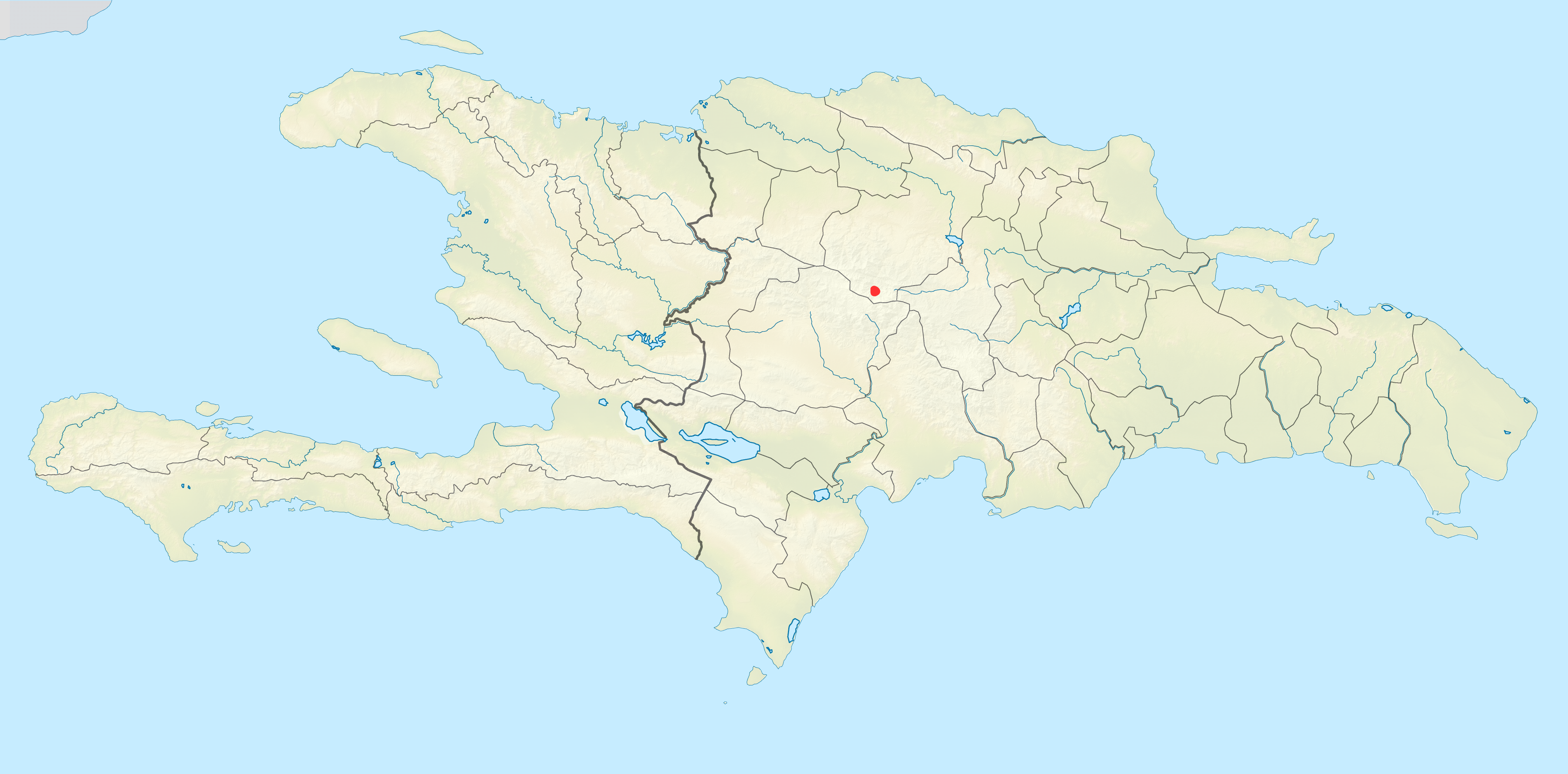
- Distribution of Panolopus marcanoi (known range in red)

Synonyms
- Celestus marcanoi (Schwartz & Incháustegui, 1976); Diploglossus marcanoi Schwartz & Inchaustegui, 1976

= Panolopus marcanoi =

Species of lizard

Panolopus marcanoi, commonly known as Marcano's galliwasp or the Pico Duarte galliwasp, is a species of lizard in the family Diploglossidae. The species is endemic to the Dominican Republic.

== Taxonomic history ==
The type series of Panolopus marcanoi was collected by Dominican herpetologist Sixto J. Incháustegui, who collected a series of 18 specimens in 1971 during an ascent to Pico Duarte. In 1976 it was described as Diploglossus marcanoi, a species new to science, by Albert Schwartz and Incháustegui in the Journal of Herpetology, published by the Society for the Study of Amphibians and Reptiles (SSAR).

The type locality is "Valle de Bao, 1800 m, Cordillera Central (road to Pico Duarte), Santiago Province, República Dominicana".

In 1991 it was classified in the genus Celestus, but was moved to Panolopus in 2021.

=== Etymology ===
The specific epithet, marcanoi, is in honor of the Dominican botanist, entomologist, herpetologist, speleologist and researcher Eugenio de Jesús Marcano Fondeur.

== Morphology ==
Panolopus marcanoi is a small species of Panolopus, with a maximum snout-to-vent length of 78 mm (3.1 in), relatively long limbs, and smooth (without keels) dorsal scales.

The dorsal ground color is pale-brown to dark-brown, with scattered, longitudinally aligned darker dots or dashes. These can be oriented as chevrons or chevron fragments, which can form longitudinal lines on the anterior portion of the dorsum. A dark face mask is present, extending posteriorly on lateral surfaces, while gradually fading and disappearing after the forelimbs.

The venter is gray, devoid of any conspicuous pattern, except for occasional, diffuse, dark blotches on the throat and chest.

== Distribution ==
The species Panolopus marcanoi is endemic to Valle de Bao, a relatively small valley located on the northern slope of the Cordillera Central.

== Ecology ==
Panolopus marcanoi is a terrestrial, semi-fossorial species. During the day, specimens have been found underneath stones, boulders and rubble, where they have been found to be relatively abundant.

The habitat can be described as an alpine savannah, which is dominated by the endemic grass Danthonia domingensis, surrounded by dense pine forests composed of Pinus occidentalis, another endemic. Although this species has only been found within the grassland habitat, it is possible that it also inhabits surrounding pine forests, but further research is necessary.

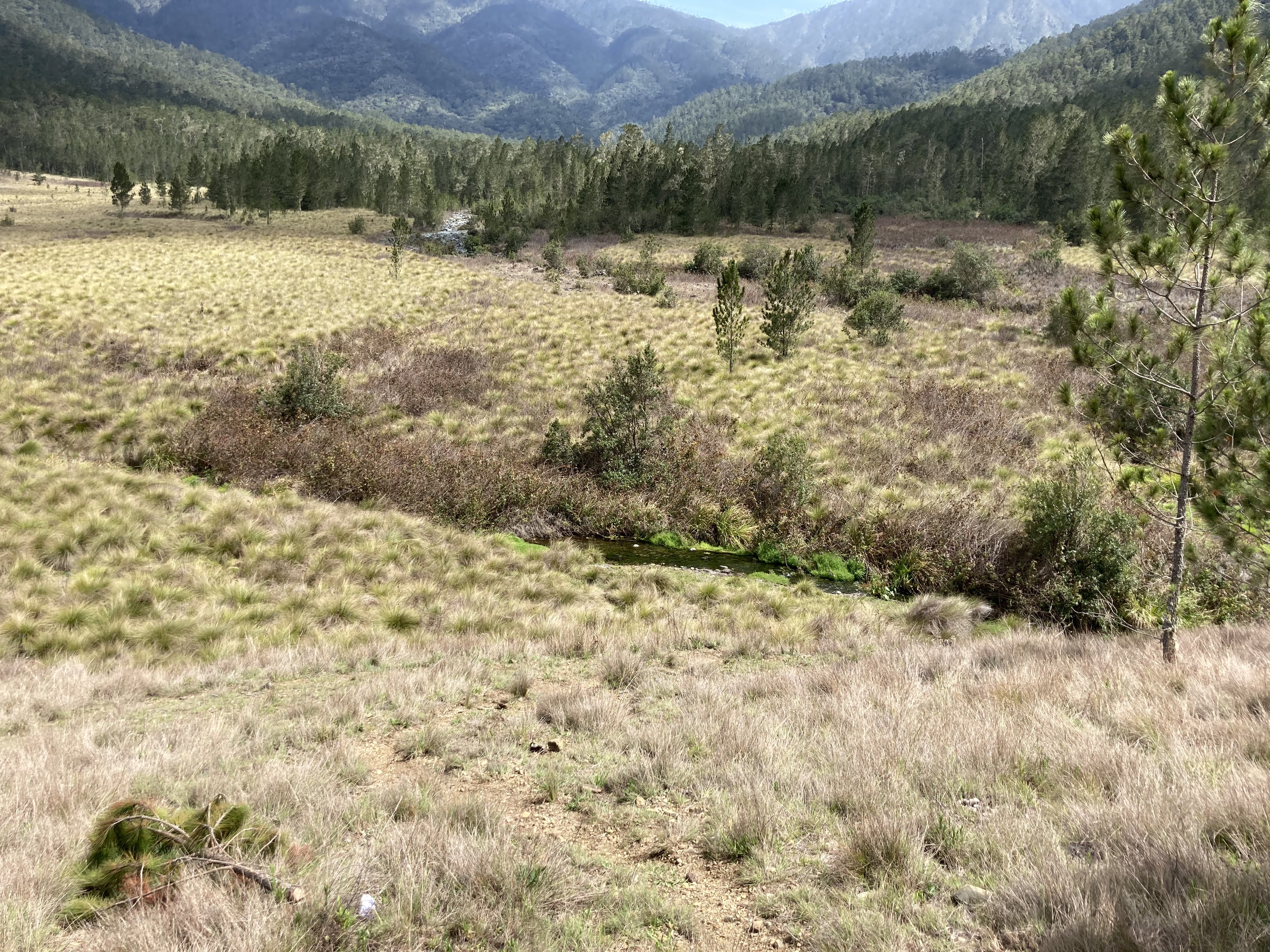
A view of Valle de Bao.

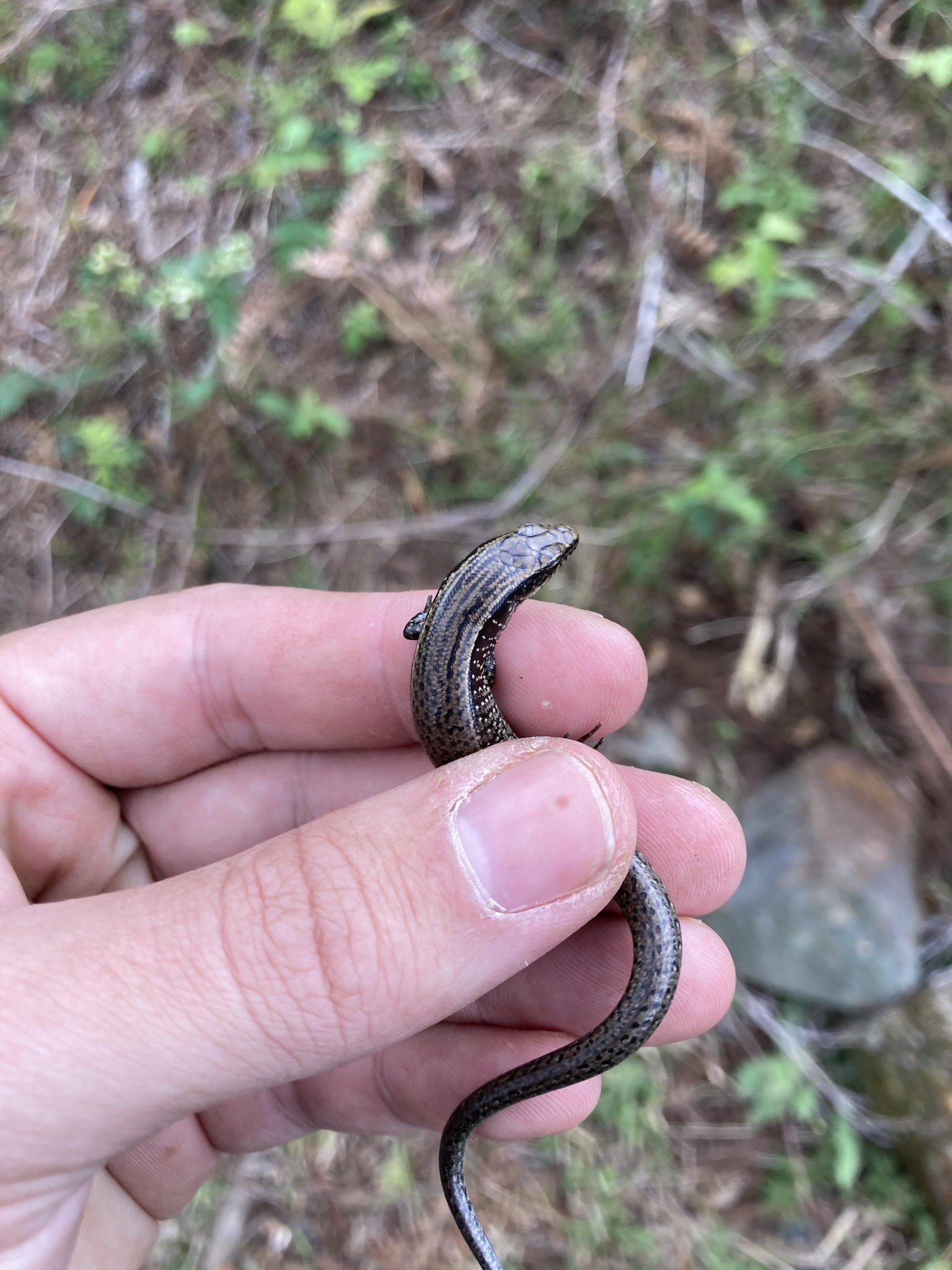
Specimen found under a stone.

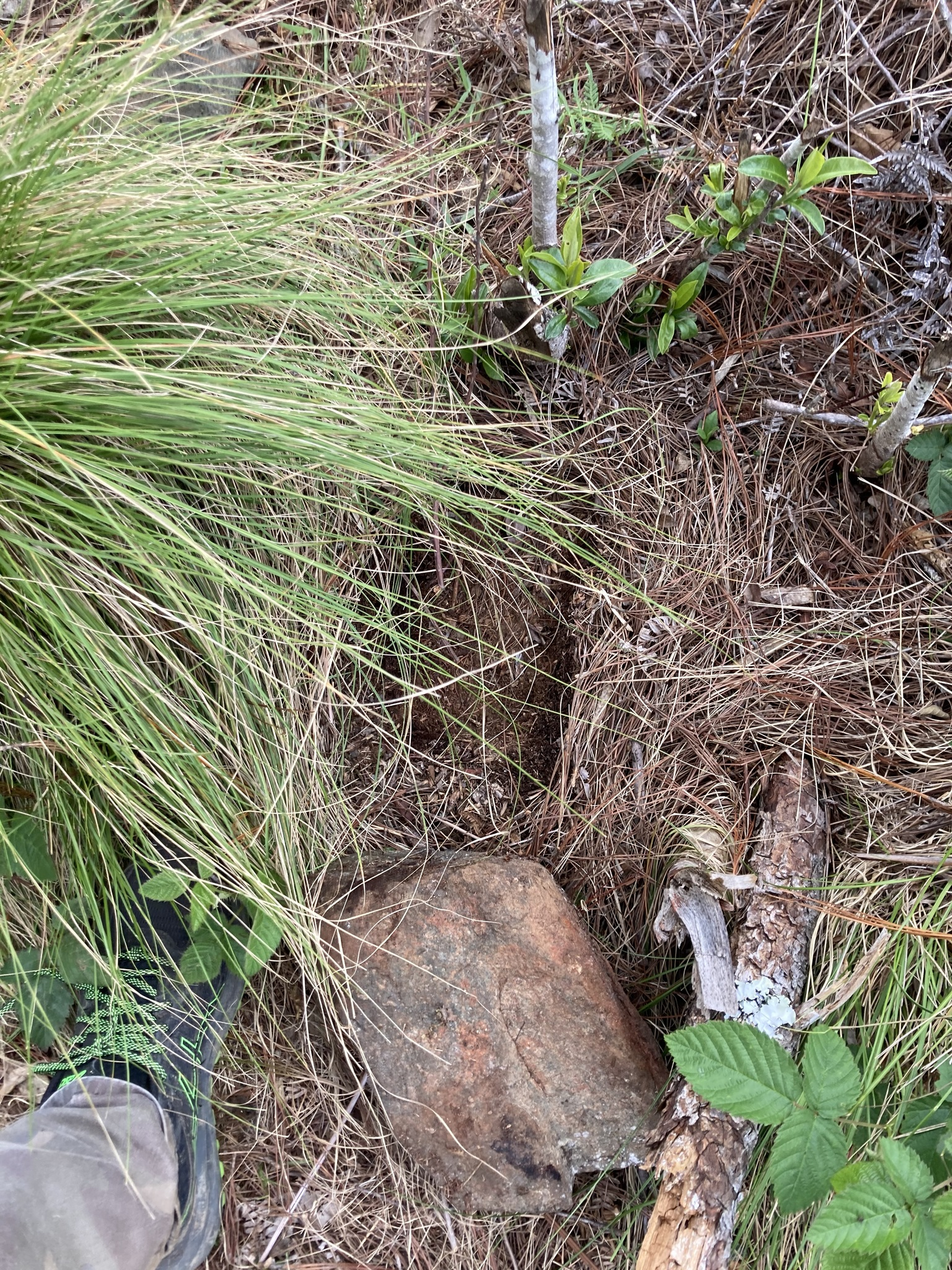
Microhabitat of C. marcanoi.

== Reproduction ==
Panolopus marcanoi is ovoviviparous.

== Conservation ==
According to the most recent IUCN Red List assessment, Panplopus marcanoi is listed as Least Concern (LC). Although the distribution of P. marcanoi is very restricted, with an estimated range of less than 120 km^{2} (46 mi^{2}), it is known to occur in a well protected area (José Armando Bermúdez National Park), and no threats have been identified to the present date. The population trends are not known.
