= Dendropemon emarginatus =

Scientific classification
- Kingdom: Plantae
- Clade: Tracheophytes
- Clade: Angiosperms
- Clade: Eudicots
- Order: Santalales
- Family: Loranthaceae
- Genus: Dendropemon
- Species: D. emarginatus

Binomial name
- Dendropemon emarginatus (Sw.) Steud.

Synonyms
- Loranthus emarginatus Sw. Phthirusa emarginata Eichl.

Species of mistletoe

Dendropemon emarginatus is an endemic species being currently found only among the tropical flora of Cuba.

Dendropemon emarginatus is commonly known as proud tree because it is said to be proud enough as to never touch the ground since it is always growing with support of some other plant. It is a plant parasite and is able to undergo photosynthesis during at least one stage of its life cycle (hemiparasite). It obtains water and required nutrients from its host plant's xylem through a structure called the haustorium, which also provides support by attaching and penetrating the host plant's bark. It is used to prepare tea to treat colds, worms and pain in general.
