= Anthony Curtiss =

American naturalist

Anthony Curtiss, pen name of Roy Abijah Curtiss Jr (born in Brooklyn, New York 10 May 1910, died 12 July 1981 in Karachi, Pakistan), also known in his later life as Muhammad Abdullah al-Hussein, was an American naturalist who wrote a short, and somewhat eccentric, book on the zoology of Tahiti.

== Early life ==
Roy Abijah Curtiss Jr. was born on 19 May 1910 in Brooklyn, New York, the son of Roy Abijah Curtiss (1880-1923), a wealthy business man who was the son and heir of Frank Curtiss former president of New York's Sixth Street Elevated Railway Society and Ethel Grace Quinn (1885-1974). His parents had married in 1907 and Roy was the oldest of their four boys. The family had an estate near Sheffield, Massachusetts and a town house on Eleventh Avenue near the American Museum of Natural History (AMNH).

A precocious boy, Curtiss developed an early interest in natural history, encouraged by his mother and his well traveled maternal grandmother who as well as having studied medicine was a convert to Islam. How precociousness is illustrated by his attendance at the 1919 conference of the American Ornithologists Union at the AMNH and by his mention in the Library Digest in 1921. In 1924 he published his first book, printing costs probably being met by his mother and grandmother, entitled An account of the natural history of New England and of Nova Scotia and lower Canada of the islands of the coasts between the Gulf of St. Lawrence and the Bay of New York; of the mountains wherein in Hudson rises; and all eastward as far as the Bay of Massachusetts. in so far as it applies to beasts, birds, reptiles, whales, fresh and salt water fish and shellfish, worms, insects and pests. Curtiss’s parents divorced in 1921 and his father died in 1923 leaving Curtiss and two of his brothers an equal share in his estate and a trust fund. One of his brothers was the writer and critic Thomas Quinn Curtiss (1915-2000) who is best known for his relationship with Klaus Mann . His other two brothers, Sidney Curtiss and Franklin Curtiss, were politicians in Massachusetts. There is a portrait of his mother painted by the Welsh artist Augustus John (1878-1961) in 1931.

== Travels and Natural History ==
Curtiss had traveled with his mother to France and in the late 1920s he signed on as a cook on a Portuguese ship. In early 1930s he journeyed to South America and in 1934 he went to Tahiti. He stayed in Tahiti for 5 years in the village of Tuatira on Tahiti Iti, the remote and rugged southeastern peninsula of the island. He married a local girl there and donated funds to improve the infrastructure connecting Tuatira with the island’s capital, Papeete.

While in Tuatira Curtiss collected notes on the wildlife that he found in the vicinity of Tuatira, both the land animals and the fauna of the adjacentreef sheltered shallow coastal waters. He made detailed descriptions of these, including the local name in the Tahitian language as well as putting forward new binomials for most of the animals he observed. When he did give them new names he followed the old names used by Carolus Linnaeus and his contemporaries. His Short Zoology of Tahiti was published on a visit home to the United States in 1938. His zoological knowledge was sufficient that he was able to identify and classify the species but his taxonomic knowledge was very outdated as he was strongly opposed to the changes to genus names that had occurred over the two Centuries since Linnaeus’s time and many of the species described by him had, in fact, been previously described. Curtiss described more than 250 species of mammals, fishes, birds, reptiles and a variety of sea and land invertebrates. taxa, both marine and terrestrial. In all, over 250 taxa were listed by him, among which there are 210 new species. An example of his old fashioned approach to taxonomy were that all of the species of decapod he named were put within Linnaeus’s genus Cancer. A review of his book in Science by Leonard Peter Schultz in 1940 mused that Curtiss was taking us back in time to Linnaeus’s era. One of the authors of the Zoological Review chose to ignore Curtiss’s binomials as he took the view that they did not meet the then current nomenclatural rules. Among the few scientists who referred to the work was Henry Weed Fowler in his Fishes of Oceania published in 1949. Curtiss dedicated the book to his 17 year old wife, Rai-a-Hitorea.

== Return to the United States and move to Haiti ==
Curtiss and his family returned to the United States in 1939, settling near Akron, New York where his intention was to write a larger volume on Tahiti’s zoology. Unfortunately, in the early months of 1940 the new family home was razed by fire and all of Curtiss’s notes and his extensive library were destroyed.

Curtiss used the insurance money from the fire to finance the move of his family to Haiti where they stayed until 1950. During his time in Haiti, Curtiss published Further Notes on the Zoology of Tahiti. It was while Curtiss was in Haiti that he started to observe and collect snakes and lizards, forwarding specimens to Doris Cochran at the Smithsonian Institution in Washington, DC. Cochrane and Curtiss began a collegial friendship and they exchanged a number of letters. Curtiss carried out detailed and accurate observations, some of which Cochrane included in papers she authored. In 1947 Curtiss published a short note about snakes in Haiti.

== Morocco and Pakistan ==
In 1950 Curtiss and his family returned to America settling briefly in Germantown in Pennsylvania. In 1951 he followed in his grandmother’s footsteps and became a convert to Islam and moved to Morocco, taking the name Muhammad Abdullah al-Hussein (or al-Hussainy). He wrote a handful of letters to the editor of Time magazine from Morocco but signed these as Anthony Curtiss. He does not appear to have remained in North Africa long and had soon moved to Karachi in Pakistan. Here he retained his interest in natural history and was involved in the collection of freshwater fishes for the Humboldt Museum in Berlin, the specimens being credited to his adopted name. He remained in Pakistan until his death in Karachi on 12 July 1981. His papers and manuscript autobiography are retained in the Smithsonian Institution.

== Taxon described by him ==
- See Category:Taxa named by Anthony Curtiss

== Taxon named in his honor ==
- Curtiss is commemorated in the scientific name of a species of Hispaniolan lizard, Celestus curtissi.
- Panolopus curtissi (Grant, 1951), also known commonly as Curtiss' galliwasp, Curtis's galliwasp, and the Hispaniolan khaki galliwasp, is a species of lizard in the family Diploglossidae endemic to the island of Hispaniola and surrounding islets.
