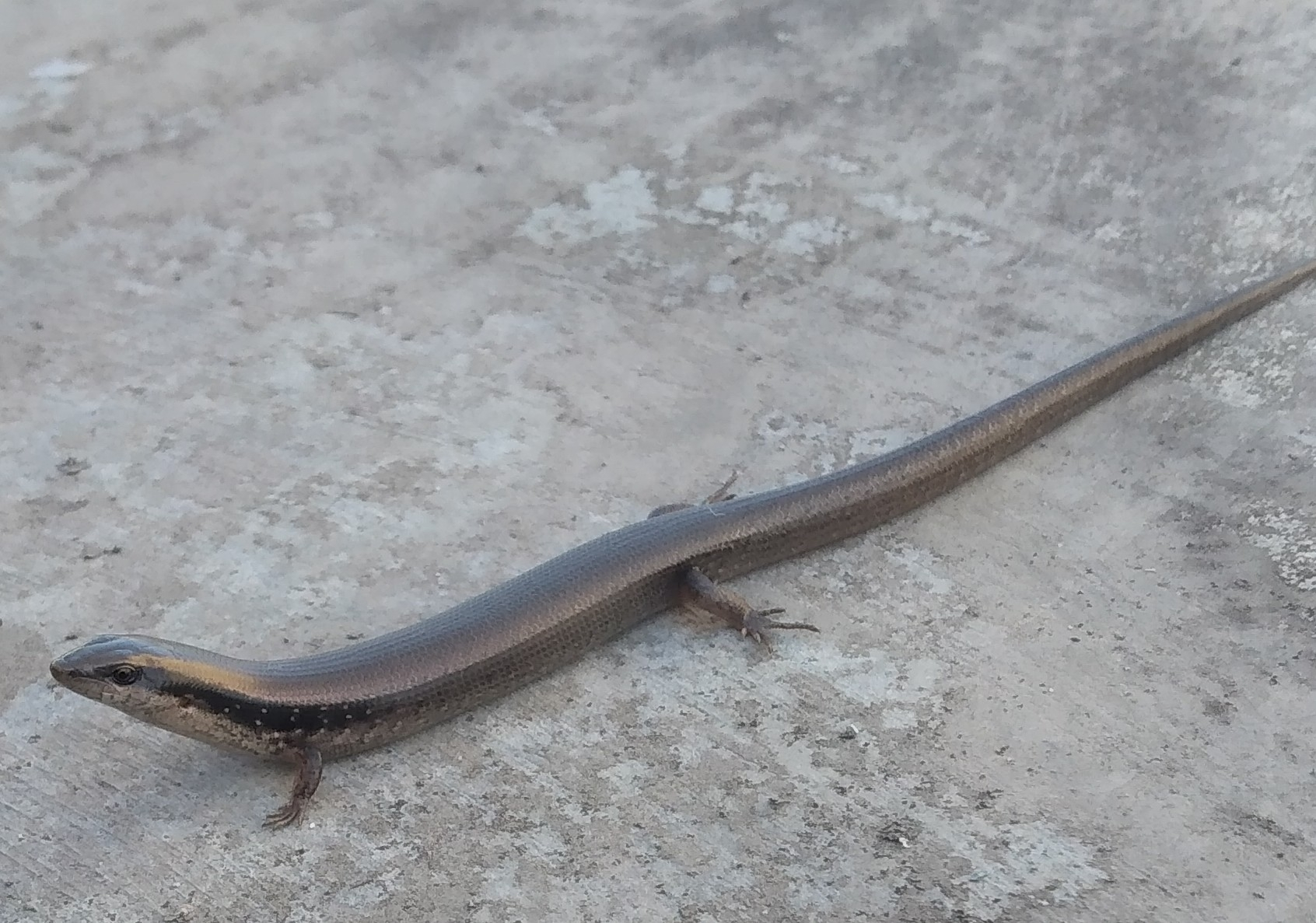

Conservation status
- Least Concern (IUCN 3.1)

Scientific classification
- Kingdom: Animalia
- Phylum: Chordata
- Class: Reptilia
- Order: Squamata
- Suborder: Anguimorpha
- Family: Diploglossidae
- Genus: Panolopus
- Species: P. costatus

Binomial name
- Panolopus costatus Cope, 1862

Synonyms
- Celestus costatus (Cope, 1862)

= Panolopus costatus =

Species of lizard

Panolopus costatus, the Hispaniolan smooth galliwasp or common Hispaniolan galliwasp, is a species of lizard of the Diploglossidae family. It is endemic to the Caribbean island of Hispaniola (in both the Dominican Republic and Haiti).

== Taxonomy ==
It was formerly classified in the genus Celestus, but was moved to Panolopus in 2021. With 11 subspecies, and a wide range, P. costatus may represent a species complex.
