= Panolopus curtissi =

Conservation status
- Least Concern (IUCN 3.1)

Scientific classification
- Kingdom: Animalia
- Phylum: Chordata
- Class: Reptilia
- Order: Squamata
- Suborder: Anguimorpha
- Family: Diploglossidae
- Genus: Panolopus
- Species: P. curtissi

Binomial name
- Panolopus curtissi (Grant, 1951)

Synonyms
- Celestus curtissi Grant, 1951; Diploglossus curtissi — Schwartz, 1964; Celestus curtissi — Schwartz & Henderson, 1991

Species of lizard

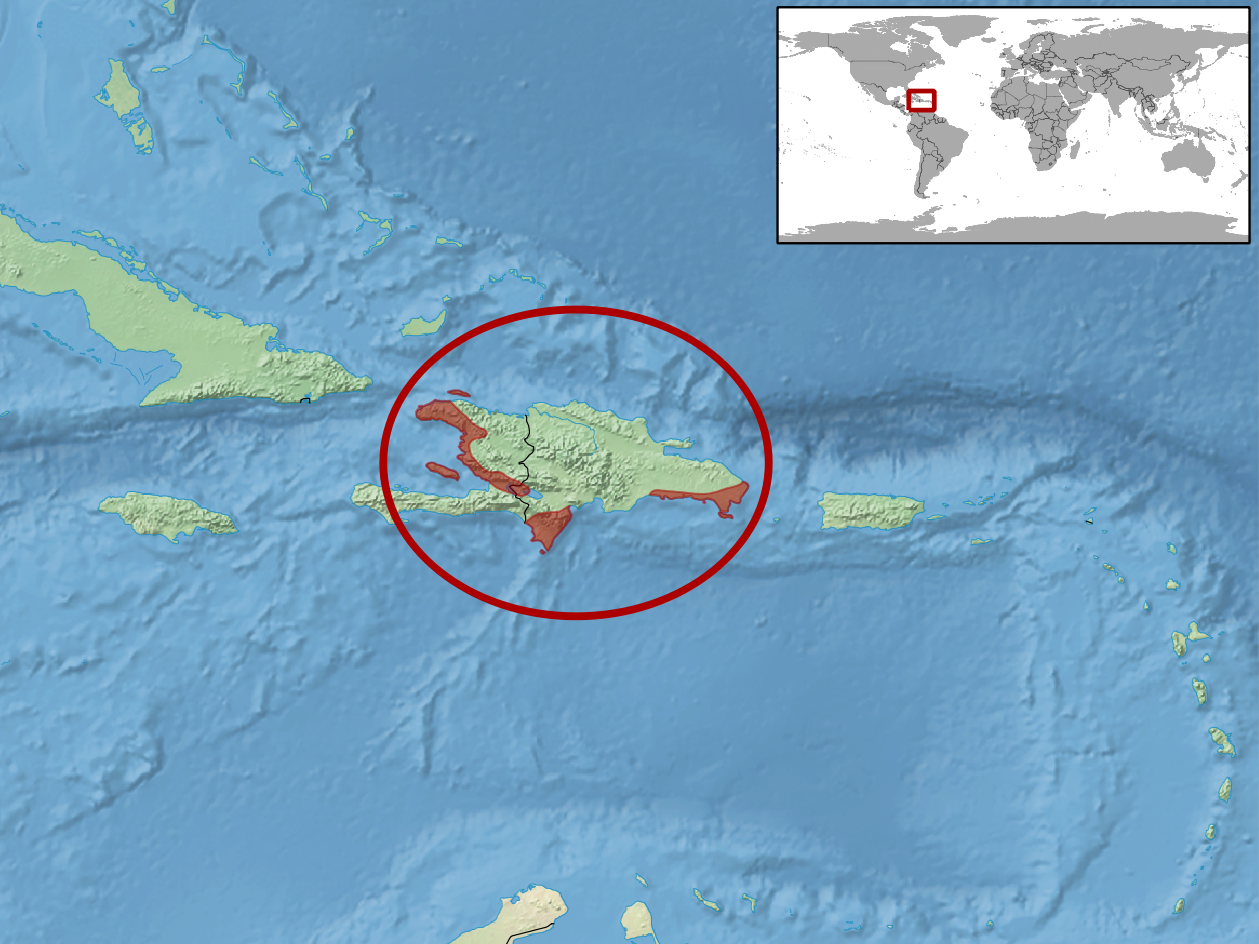
Geographic distribution of Celestus curtissi

Panolopus curtissi, also known commonly as Curtiss' galliwasp, Curtis's galliwasp, and the Hispaniolan khaki galliwasp, is a species of lizard in the family Diploglossidae endemic to the island of Hispaniola and surrounding islets.

== Taxonomy ==
It was formerly classified in the genus Celestus, but was moved to Panolopus in 2021.

== Etymology ==
The specific name, curtissi, is in honor of American naturalist Anthony Curtiss.

== Geographic range ==
P. curtissi is found in the Dominican Republic and Haiti.

== Habitat ==
The preferred natural habitat of P. curtissi is dry forest, at altitudes from sea level to 550 m (1,800 ft).

== Description ==
Small for its genus, P. curtissi has a snout-to-vent length (SVL) of less than 9 cm (3.5 in) as an adult.

== Reproduction ==
P. curtissi is viviparous (ovoviviparous). Litter size is 2–5.

== Subspecies ==
Four subspecies are recognized as being valid, including the nominotypical subspecies.

- Panolopus curtissi aporus (Schwartz), 1964
- Panolopus curtissi curtissi Grant, 1951
- Panolopus curtissi diastatus (Schwartz, 1964)
- Panolopus curtissi hylonomus (Schwartz, 1964)
