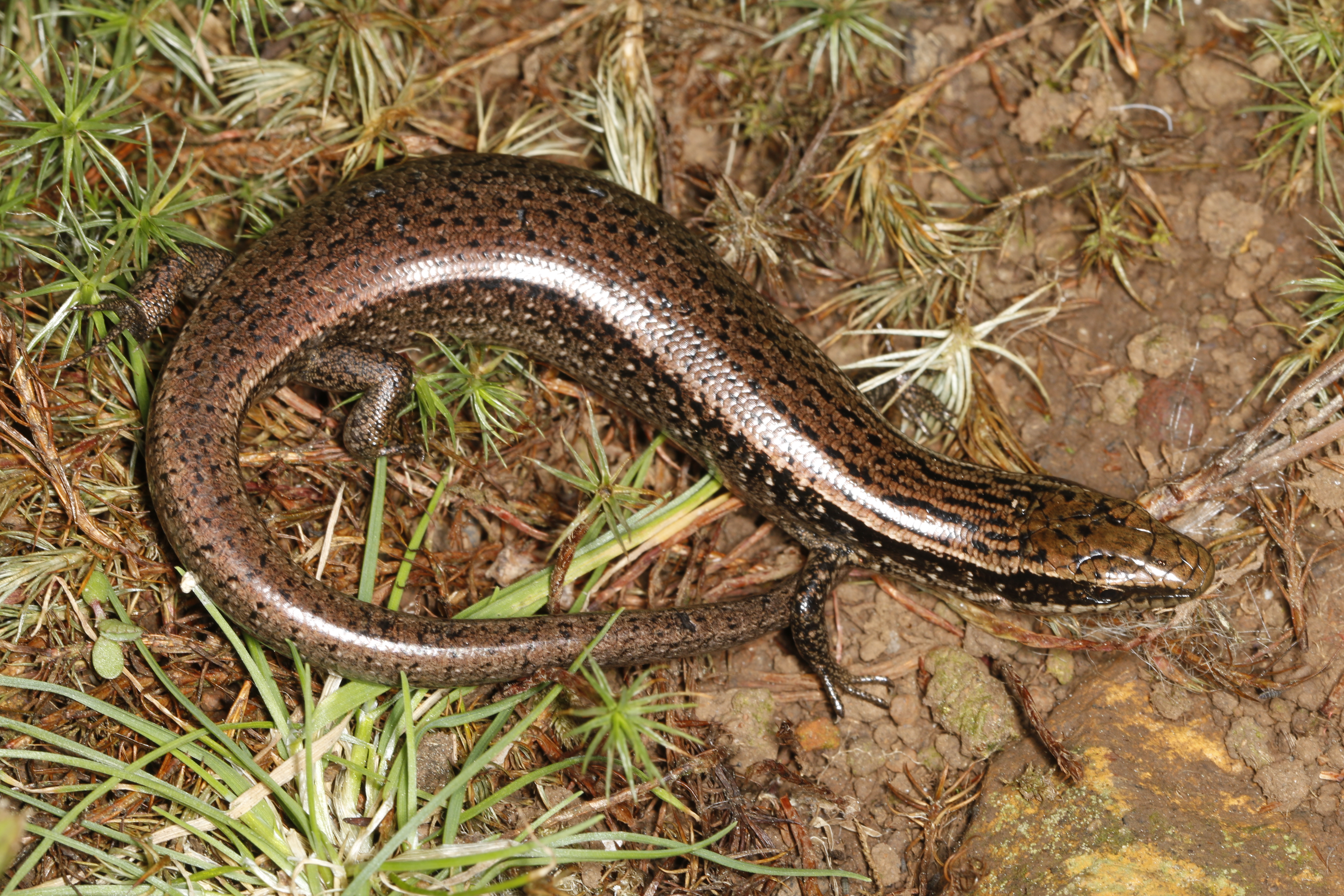
- Marcano's galliwasp (P. marcanoi)

Scientific classification
- Domain: Eukaryota
- Kingdom: Animalia
- Phylum: Chordata
- Class: Reptilia
- Order: Squamata
- Family: Diploglossidae
- Subfamily: Celestinae
- Genus: Panolopus; Cope, 1862

Species
- P. costatus; P. curtissi; P. marcanoi

= Panolopus =

Genus of diploglossid lizards

Panolopus is a genus of diploglossid lizards endemic to the island of Hispaniola in the Caribbean, in both the Dominican Republic and Haiti.

== Taxonomy ==
There are three species in this genus, all of which were formerly classified in the genus Celestus until the genus Panolopus was revived for them in 2021.

== Species ==
- Panolopus costatus Cope, 1862 – Hispaniolan smooth galliwasp or common Hispaniolan galliwasp
- Panolopus curtissi (Grant, 1951) – Curtiss' galliwasp or Hispaniolan khaki galliwasp
- Panolopus marcanoi (Schwartz & Incháustegui, 1976) – Marcano's galliwasp or Pico Duarte galliwasp
