= Rivière Soliette =

River in Haiti and the Dominican Republic

Coordinates: 18°29′N 71°50′W

Rivière Soliette Arroyo Blanco
- Location of mouth

Location
- Country: Haiti (Rivière Soliette), Dominican Republic (Arroyo Blanco)

The Rivière Soliette (in Haiti, pronounced [ʁivjɛʁ sɔljɛt]) or Arroyo Blanco (in the Dominican Republic) is a river in the southwest of the Dominican Republic and Haiti. On 24 May 2004, it overran its banks resulting in the death of over one thousand people, with hundreds more injured and homeless near the city of Jimani.
