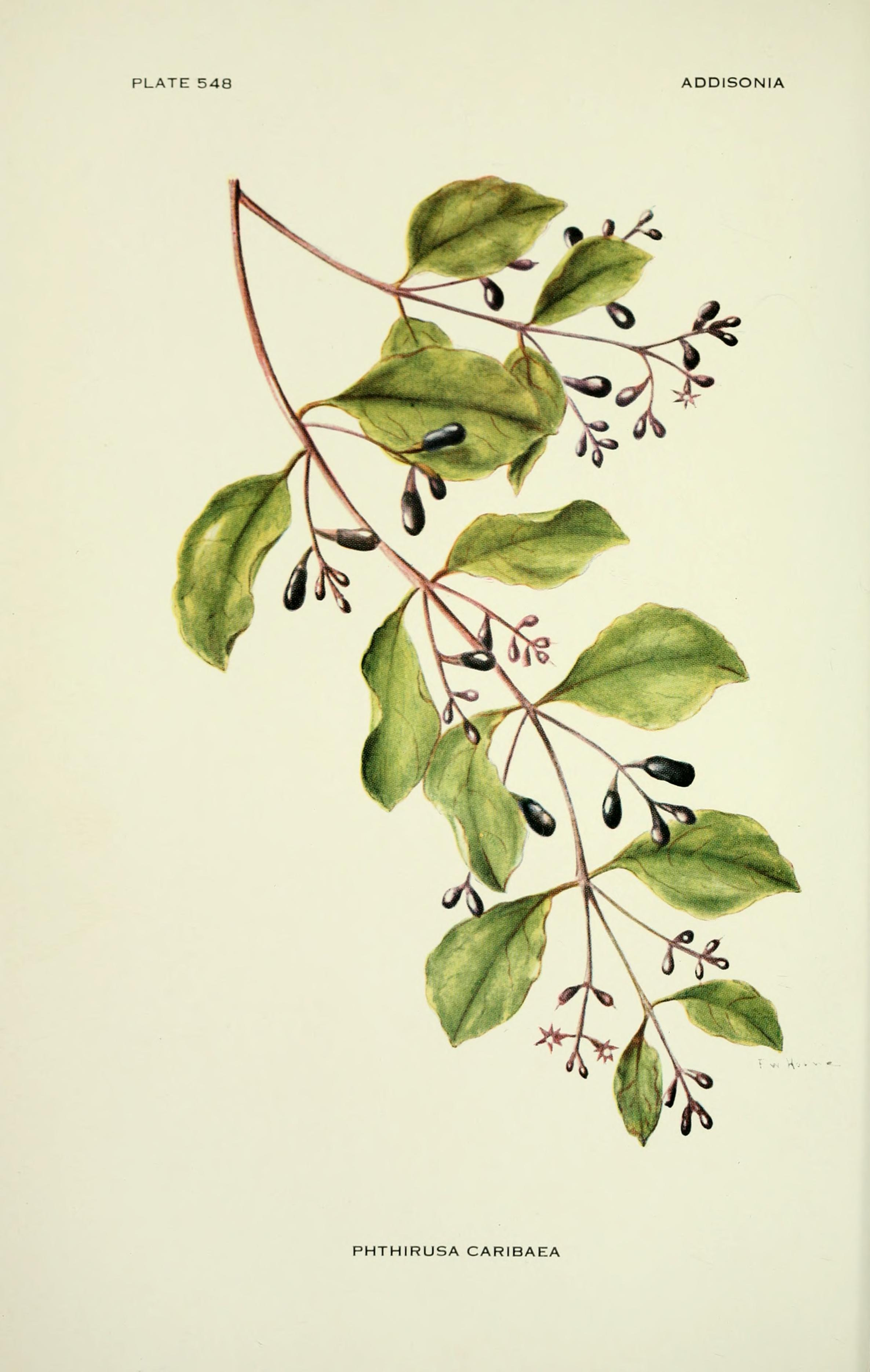
- Dendropemon caribaeus (artist: F.W.Horne)

Scientific classification
- Kingdom: Plantae
- Clade: Tracheophytes
- Clade: Angiosperms
- Clade: Eudicots
- Order: Santalales
- Family: Loranthaceae
- Genus: Dendropemon (Blume) Rchb.

Species
- See text

= Dendropemon =

Genus of mistletoes

Dendropemon is a genus of mistletoes which is endemic to the Caribbean. Members of the genus are hemi-parasites which normally grow on trees and shrubs, although self-parasitism is known to occur. The approximately 31 species range from The Bahamas and Cuba in the north and west, to Barbados and St. Vincent in the southwest. Diversity and endemism is highest on the island of Hispaniola.

The name Dendropemon coined by botanist Carl Ludwig Blume in 1830. He recognised it as a section within the genus Loranthus, rather than a distinct genus. Although no derivation was given for the name of the genus, it is believed to come from the Greek dendron (δένδρν), tree, and pemon (πήμων), harmful.

== Description ==
Dendropemon is a genus of hemi-parasitic mistletoes which parasitise trees and shrubs. Plants are "moderate" sized with simple, opposite leaves and stems that are generally rounded or square, but are occasionally winged. Epicortical roots are present in most, if not all species. These roots run along the surface of the host plant's branches and produce haustoria which grow into the stem of the host plant. Fruit are single-seeded berries that can be multi-coloured, often black, purple, red or orange. The seeds are surrounded by viscin, which helps them adhere to tree branches.

== Selected species ==
- Dendropemon acutifolius Urb.
- Dendropemon alatus Tiegh.
- Dendropemon caymanensis Proctor
- Dendropemon emarginatus (Sw.) Steud.
