= Massif du Nord =

Mountain range of Haiti

- Location within Haiti

Highest point
- Elevation: 1,219.2 m (4,000 ft)
- Coordinates: 19°35′0″N 72°25′0″W

Geography
- Location: Haiti

The Massif du Nord (French pronunciation: [masif dy nɔʁ]) is the longest mountain range of Haiti.

== Geography ==
The mountain range is located in Northern Haiti, in the departments of the Nord and in Artibonite. It is the western extension of the Cordillera Central that runs through the Dominican Republic. The Plaine-du-Nord lies along the northern Dominican Republic–Haiti border, between the Massif du Nord and the North Atlantic Ocean. The range extends to the northwest under the name of the Chaîne du Haut-Piton. The Guayamouc River flows south from the range.

The range's altitude varies from 600–1,210 metres (1,970–3,970 ft). This lowland area of 2,000 km^{2} (770 sq mi) is about 150 km (90 mi) long and 30 km (20 mi) wide.

== History ==
After the Haitian Revolution, the Citadelle Laferrière was built by King Henri Christophe. It overlooks the city of Cap-Haïtien from its height of 865 m (2,838 ft).

== See also ==
- Mountain ranges of the Caribbean
