= Cordillera Central, Dominican Republic =

Mountain range in the Dominican Republic

Coordinates: 18°45′N 70°30′W

Cordillera Central
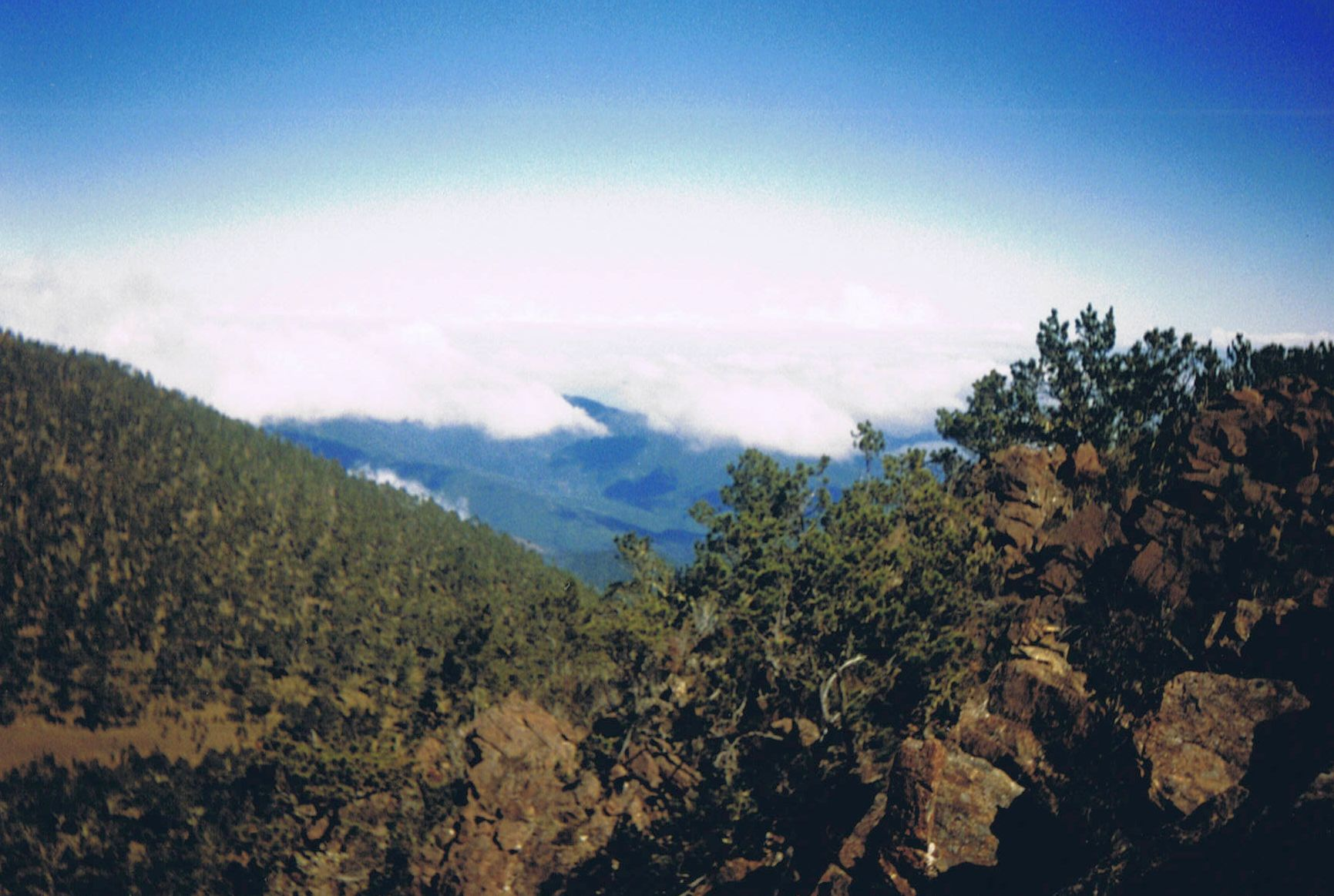
- View from the top of Pico Duarte, the range's highest peak

Highest point
- Peak: Pico Duarte
- Elevation: 3,098 m (10,164 ft)
- Prominence: 3,098 m (10,164 ft)

Geography
- Location within the Dominican Republic
- Location: Dominican Republic

The Cordillera Central is the highest mountain range in the Dominican Republic and in all of the Caribbean, running through the center of the island of Hispaniola in the Greater Antilles. It is connected to the Massif du Nord mountain range in neighboring Haiti.

== Geography ==
The Cordillera Central is home to the highest peaks in the Caribbean: Pico Duarte (3,098 m or 10,164 ft) (the highest point in the Caribbean), La Pelona (3,094 m or 10,150 ft) and La Rucilla (3,049 m or 10,003 ft). Connected to the smaller Massif du Nord in Haiti, it gradually bends southwards and finishes near the town of San Cristóbal on the Caribbean coastal plains. Because of its altitude, cool temperature, and scenic vistas, the Cordillera Central is also known as the "Dominican Alps".

=== Parks ===
José Armando Bermúdez National Park (Parque Nacional Armando Bermúdez) is located in the range, protecting a diversity of flora and fauna species. The pale magnolia tree (Magnolia pallescens), an endangered species endemic to the Dominican Republic, grows in the park.

== Other ranges ==
In the southwest corner of the country, south of the Cordillera Central, there are two, largely dry and rocky ranges. The more northerly of the two is the Sierra de Neiba, while in the south the Sierra de Bahoruco is a continuation of the Massif de la Selle in Haiti.
