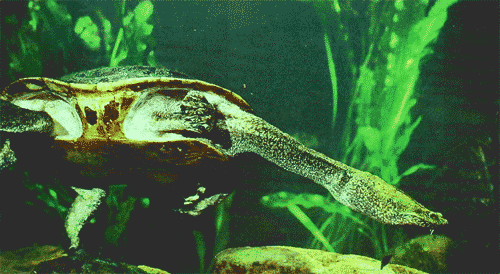
- Swimming

Conservation status
- Least Concern (IUCN 2.3)

Scientific classification
- Kingdom: Animalia
- Phylum: Chordata
- Class: Reptilia
- Order: Testudines
- Suborder: Pleurodira
- Family: Chelidae
- Genus: Chelodina
- Subgenus: Chelydera
- Species: C. burrungandjii

Binomial name
- Chelodina burrungandjii Thomson, Kennett & Georges, 2000

Synonyms
- Chelodina burrungandjii Thomson, Kennett & Georges, 2000

= Chelodina burrungandjii =

Sandstone snake-necked turtle

Species of turtle

Chelodina (Chelydera) burrungandjii, the sandstone snake-necked turtle or Arnhem Land long-necked turtle, is a medium-sized turtle reaching carapace lengths of 316 mm. The species is found in the sandstone plateaus and escarpments and the plunge pools of Arnhem Land of the Northern Territory. The species had been long recognised as valid. However, it had been difficult to research due to the remoteness of its habitat. Efforts to breed this species in captivity had been largely unsuccessful, until National Aquarium Herpetologist Matthew Benedict lead a successful breeding project in 2021. The species occurs in proximity to Chelodina rugosa, to which it is closely related. For the most part the two species are parapatric in distribution. However, they do come together in limited locations such as plunge pools at the base of the escarpments. In these areas there is hybridization between the species.

== Taxonomy ==
When initially described, populations in the Kimberley Region were also assigned to this species. The closest relatives of the sandstone longneck turtle are Chelodina walloyarrina and Chelodina rugosa, and along with Chelodina expansa, Chelodina kuchlingi and Chelodina parkeri they make up the subgenus Chelydera which are strike and gape piscivores with reduced plastra, enlarged back feet and legs and flattened heads with large mouths. They are differentiated from the subgenus Chelodina, which have more complete plastrons, smaller necks and are not strike and gape predators. The last group in the Chelodina is Macrochelodina containing a single species Chelodina colliei from south-west Australia. This species is similar to the South American Hydromedusa in many respects.
