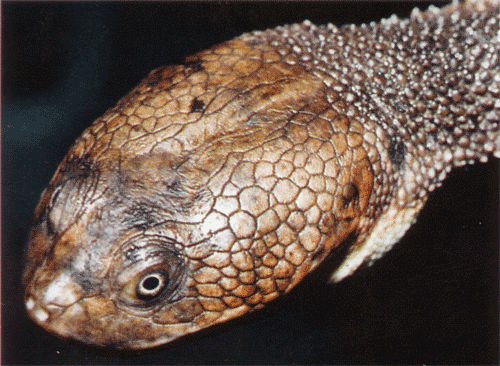

Scientific classification
- Kingdom: Animalia
- Phylum: Chordata
- Class: Reptilia
- Order: Testudines
- Suborder: Pleurodira
- Family: Chelidae
- Genus: Chelodina
- Subgenus: Chelodina
- Species: C. canni

Binomial name
- Chelodina canni McCord & Thomson, 2002
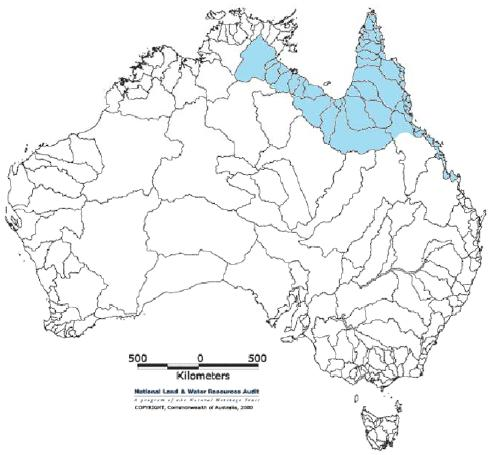
- Distribution of C. canni in Australia.

Synonyms
- Chelodina rankini Wells and Wellington 1985: 8 (nomen nudum); Chelodina canni McCord and Thomson 2002: 256; Chelodina rankini Wells 2007a: 2 (07:86, 10:43) (nomen nudum)

= Chelodina canni =

Cann's snake-necked turtle

Species of turtle

Chelodina canni, also known commonly as Cann's snake-necked turtle, is a species of turtle in the family Chelidae. The species is endemic to Australia, where it is found in the northern and northeastern parts of the continent. It has a narrow zone of hybridization with its related species the eastern snake-necked turtle, C. longicollis. For many years C. canni was assumed to be the same species as C. novaeguineae from New Guinea. However, in 2002 it was shown that these two species differ both morphologically and genetically, and therefore C. canni was separated and described as a unique species.

== Taxonomy ==
Order: Testudines Linnaeus, 1758
Suborder: Pleurodira Cope, 1864
Family: Chelidae Ogilby, 1905
Subfamily: Chelodininae Baur, 1893: 211

Type data - Holotype: NTM 24515; an adult female (carapace length, CL = 215.3 mm; carapace width, CW8 = 167.2 mm), preserved in alcohol; collected with the help of local aboriginal people at Malogie Waterhole, near Scarlet Hill on Kalala Station (16° 08' S, 133° 36' E), Northern Territory, Australia.

Etymology - This species is named in honour of John Robert Cann (born 1938) of Sydney, Australia for his lifetime of work with the freshwater turtles of Australia.

Taxonomic History - For many years this species was considered to be a secondary and disjunct population of Chelodina novaeguineae Boulenger, 1888. In recent years many started to believe that this was not the case. An attempt to describe it as Chelodina rankini was made by Wells and Wellington (1985) however this was shown to be a nomen nudum by Iverson et al., 2001, the species was finally described by William McCord and Scott Thomson in 2002.

Subfamilies were resurrected for this family after it was discovered that the South American and Australian members are reciprocally monophyletic, that is they each have their nearest relatives within the continent (Georges et al., 1998).

== Description ==
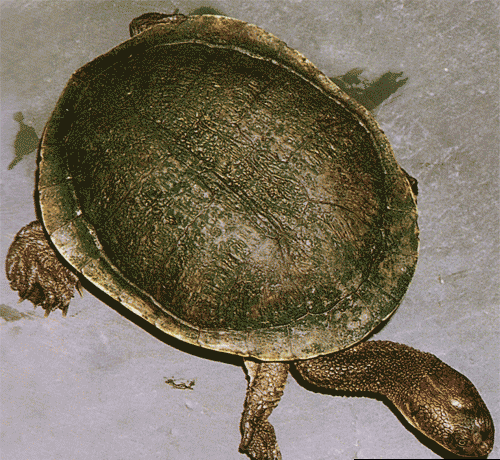
Adult female Chelodina canni

Adults of C. canni can be diagnosed by the wide, rounded carapace with a moderately deep midvertebral trough; a median carapacial keel either absent or minimal, being most observable in the eastern populations; a wide plastron with dark seams on an otherwise uniformly yellow plastron; first and second marginal scutes equal or nearly equal in dorsal surface area; wide head with a red to pink suffusion on the head, neck, and limbs; and bluntly pointed neck tubercles. Hatchlings have an extensive orange-red ventral head, neck, and plastral pattern extending well onto the dorsal aspect of the marginal scutes.

== Distribution ==
C. canni is known from the Roper River drainage (including Maria Island in the Gulf of Carpentaria) in Northern Territory, eastward through the drainages of the Gulf of Carpentaria in northwest Queensland. In Cape York it is found in drainages from Cairns in the north down to Rockhampton in the south where a narrow hybrid zone with C. longicollis is found (Georges et al., 2002).

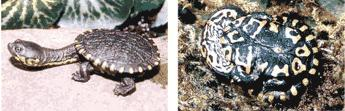
Juvenile Chelodina canni
