= Aramia snake-necked turtle =

Scientific classification
- Kingdom: Animalia
- Phylum: Chordata
- Order: Testudines
- Suborder: Pleurodira
- Family: Chelidae
- Genus: Chelodina
- Species: C. ipudinapi

Binomial name
- Chelodina ipudinapi Joseph-Ouni & McCord, 2022

Species of turtle

The Aramia snake-necked turtle (Chelodina ipudinapi), is a species of poorly known chelid turtle endemic to Papua New Guinea. It was first described in 2022 and is only known to inhabit the Aramia and upper Bamu river systems in the Western Province.

== Taxonomy ==
The specific name is derived from the name the local Gogodala people have given for the species.

== Description ==
It is closely related to the New Guinea snake-necked turtle, with whom it is sympatric, differing in its smaller size, scalation and head colouration. It has some carapace and plastron features which further serve to distinguish it from its larger relative.

== Habitat and distribution ==
It appears to be endemic to the Aramia and upper Bamu freshwater river ecosystems, and is absent from coastal areas. The holotype was collected in November 1992 in the type locality within the vicinity of Balimo.
