= Chelodina murrayi =

Chelodina murrayi Temporal range: Late Miocene

Scientific classification
- Domain: Eukaryota
- Kingdom: Animalia
- Phylum: Chordata
- Class: Reptilia
- Order: Testudines
- Suborder: Pleurodira
- Family: Chelidae
- Genus: Chelodina
- Subgenus: Chelodina
- Species: C. murrayi

Binomial name
- Chelodina murrayi Yates, 2013

Synonyms
- Chelodina murrayi Yates 2013

Extinct species of turtle

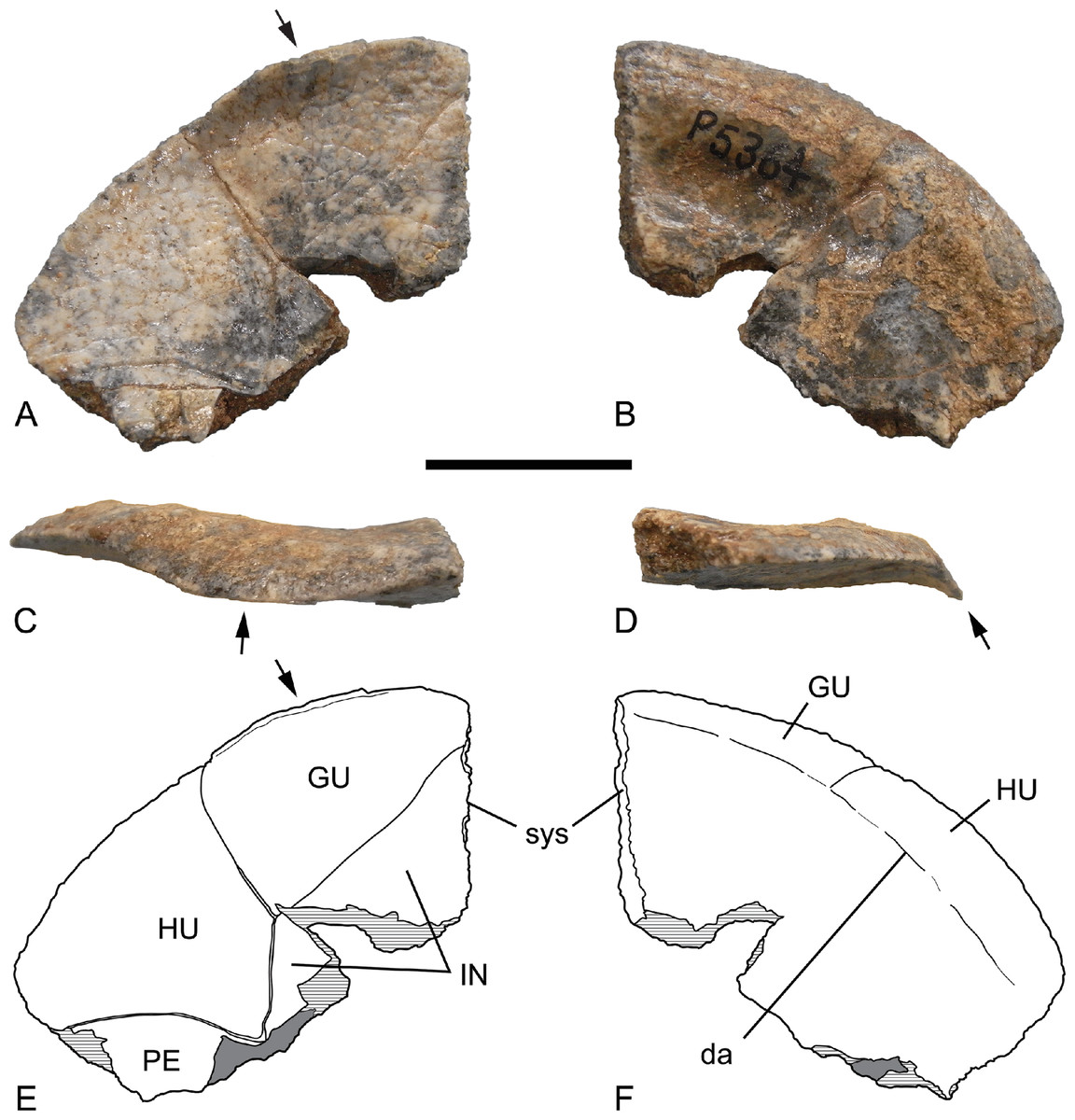
Fossil of Chelodina murrayi. The right epiplastron (part of the plastron, or lower shell) is shown in multiple views: (A) ventral, (B) dorsal, (C) front, and (D) back side. Diagrams (E, F) label scute regions and interpret anatomical features. Scale bar = 20 mm.

Chelodina murrayi is an extinct species of snake-necked turtle from the Waite Formation on the Alcoota Scientific Reserve, north-east of Alice Springs in the Northern Territory of Australia. The species would appear to belong to the Chelodina novaeguineae group of species within the subgenus Chelodina.
