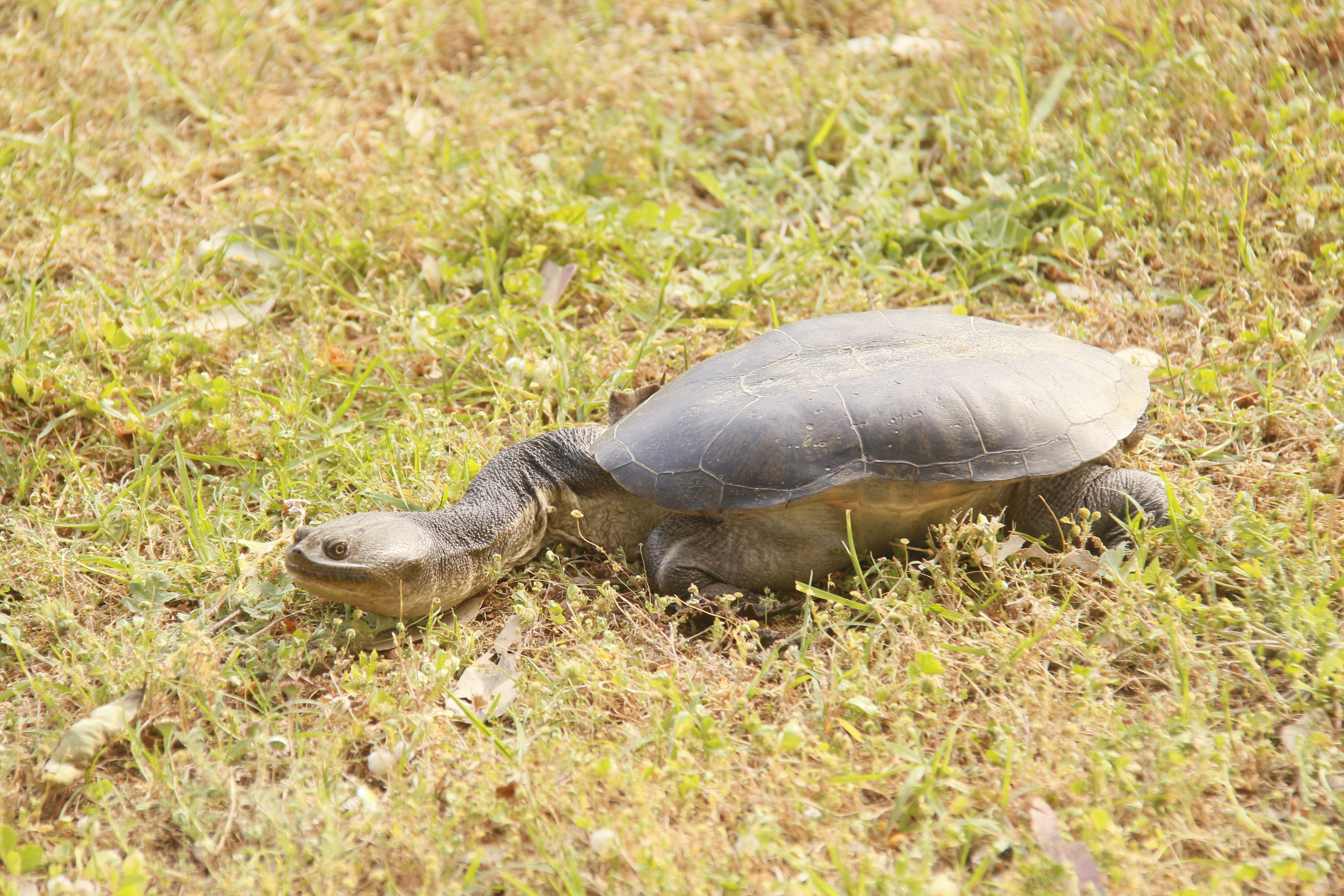

Conservation status
- Near Threatened (IUCN 2.3)

Scientific classification
- Kingdom: Animalia
- Phylum: Chordata
- Class: Reptilia
- Order: Testudines
- Suborder: Pleurodira
- Family: Chelidae
- Genus: Chelodina
- Subgenus: Macrochelodina
- Species: C. oblonga

Binomial name
- Chelodina oblonga Gray, 1841:446

= Oblong turtle =

Species of turtle

The oblong turtle (Chelodina oblonga), also known commonly as the narrow-breasted snake-necked turtle, southwestern snake-necked turtle, (western) long-neck(ed) turtle, and as yaakan or booyi in Noongar language, is a species of turtle in the family Chelidae. The species is endemic to the southwestern part of Western Australia.

The species has been successfully bred in captivity in Cologne Zoological Garden and was once largely bred in captivity for the pet trade in Western Australia. There’s currently not enough research to determine the species’ exact lifespan, but it’s widely agreed upon that they live for at least 40 years, with many reports indicating they likely live for up to twice that long.

While all turtles were once believed to be mute, a 2009 study found the reptile to have an acoustic repertoire of 12 unique vocalisations. Not only did this discovery lead to other related turtle species being disproven to be mute, it clearly indicates that C. oblonga is a socially interactive species, with a unique life cycle of no parental care during the incubation phase, no parental care in the nest to water phase, but a socially interactive and communal lifestyle as it develops. Being a long lived, social animal, reaching sexual maturity at an age of 12-15 years, along with its multiple displayed signs of learned behaviour are all characteristics that suggest this is an intelligent, highly misunderstood species.

== Description ==
Adults: female carapace length is larger than that of males, reaching lengths of up to 40cm. Combined with their head and neck length, a female may reach lengths of over 80cm in total body size. Males have an average carapace length of 25-28cm and reach sexual maturity when their carapace is approximately 140mm, while females reach maturity at a carapace length of 160-170mm.

Hatchlings: no ethical, non-invasive methods of sex determination are known for hatchlings, which very rarely display significant size variation between individuals of the same or separate nest. Upon emerging from their nest, hatchlings are typically 29-33mm.

== Distribution, habitat and diet ==
The natural distribution of the oblong turtle is southwestern Australia, from the Fitzgerald River National Park in the south-eastern edge of the distribution, up to Jurien Bay (Hill River) in the north. There is also a suspected introduced population around Geraldton, another 170 km north of Jurien Bay. There is a slight overlap of native geographical range with the Flat-shelled turtle (Chelodina steindachneri), however there has only been one recorded occurrence of the two species co-existing in the same waterbody.

The oblong turtle lives in a wide range of freshwater habitats, including wetlands, lakes and rivers. They are known to be capable of living in urban and agricultural environments, such as urban lakes and dams. The turtle is an opportunistic carnivore and the apex predator of the wetlands within its native range. Using their distinct "snake-neck" they deploy a recoil and strike technique to capture prey, feeding mainly on macro-invertebrates such as yabbies, fish, tadpoles, frogs, ducklings and carrion, usually that of the noxious European carp. Hatchlings feed on mosquito larvae and other small aquatic invertebrates.

== Etymology ==
The specific name/epithet, oblonga, comes directly from the Latin word oblonga (or oblongum), meaning "long, elongated, or oblong." This refers to the oblong-shaped shell of the species.

== Hybridisation with other species ==
Several non-native species of freshwater turtles have been introduced to the Perth region, including the red-eared slider (Trachemys scripta elegans), Murray River turtle (Emydura macquarii), and eastern snake-necked turtle (Chelodina longicollis). These are likely to be pet animals that have been released into waterways or lakes after being transported from the eastern side of the country.

While a pattern of isolation-by-distance drives population genomic structure across the oblong turtle distribution, several populations have been found to contain hybrid individuals of Chelodina longicollis x oblonga. Some of these individuals appeared to show genetic ancestry consistent with backcrossing between an F1 hybrid C. longicollis x oblonga and a pure C. oblonga individual, suggesting that hybrid offspring are fertile. It has also been found that hybrids can breed with C. longicollis and produce offspring, but it’s not yet clear if these individuals are fertile. This discovery was made upon the collection of a hybrid male C. longicollis x oblonga and a pure female C. longicollis in July/August 2024, where a hatchling had also been observed. No other turtles were present in the enclosed waterbody which was further trapped after the collection of the second turtle. DNA sequencing determined the male (collected by D. Williams on 31/07/2024) to be a hybrid, while the female (collected by the same person on 14/08/2024) was determined a pure C. longicollis. The known presence of the hatchling made this the first observed wild hybridisation event and the key evidence that backcrossing was likely occurring in wild populations. The implications of gene flow from C. longicollis into C. oblonga are currently unclear. It is also possible that oblong turtles are being moved across Australia, evidenced by the introduced population around Geraldton.

== Taxonomic history ==
This species has a very complicated taxonomic history, involving many uses of the available names and a number of mistakes in that usage. In his original concept of the two species involved Gray 1841 and 1856 clearly diagnosed two species, one from northern and one from southwestern Australia. However these were considered a single wide-ranging species by Boulenger 1889. This mistaken concept was followed for some time but was reviewed by Burbidge (1967). Unfortunately they had mixed the names up as was brought out first by Thomson (2000) and has been summarised also by Kuchling (2010).

A submission to the ICZN was put in by Thomson (2006) to maintain the prevailing usage of Chelodina rugosa over the name Chelodina oblonga for the northern snake-necked turtle with further comments by several authors. In 2013 the ICZN handed down its opinion on the issue where they deemed that the Principle of Priority should be followed. According to that ruling, the correct name for the northern snake-necked turtle was Chelodina oblonga and for the south-western snake-necked turtle is Chelodina colliei. Although that ruling required considerable effort over the ensuing 12 months to establish this nomenclature, subsequent research has reversed this finding with respect to Chelodina oblonga.

Kehlmaier et al. (2019) analyzed mitochondrial genomes of key type specimens and resolved several questions regarding taxonomy and nomenclature. They declared Chelodina oblonga a nomen dubium, affirmed Chelodina colliei as the southwestern snake-necked turtle, and called for the name Chelodina rugosa Ogilby, 1890 to be restored to the northern snake-necked turtle. This finding was supported by the findings of Shea et al. (2020) that the supposed holotype of Chelodina oblonga was in fact part of a type series and molecular work showed it was in fact from Perth. This led to a more detailed examination of its history and the determination that it was indeed the southwestern snake-necked turtle. Thus, the correct name scientific names are Chelodina oblonga for the southwestern snake-necked turtle and Chelodina rugosa for the northern, snake-necked turtle.

=== Synonymy ===
Synonymy of Chelodina oblonga, and redescriptions of the type specimens, per Shea, Thomson and Georges (2020):

- Chelodina oblonga Gray, 1841: 446 (misidentified type sensu Thomson 2000)
  - Chelodina (Macrochelodina) oblonga — Shea, Thomson & Georges, 2020
- Chelodina colliei Gray, 1856: 200
  - Chelodina colliei — Thomson, 2006
  - Macrodiremys oblonga — McCord & Joseph-Ouni, 2007
  - Chelodina (Macrodiremys) colliei — Georges & Thomson, 2010
  - Chelodina (Macrodiremys) colliei — TTWG, 2014
  - Chelodina colliei — Kehlmaier et al., 2019:6
  - Chelodina (Macrochelodina) oblonga — Shea et al., 2020
