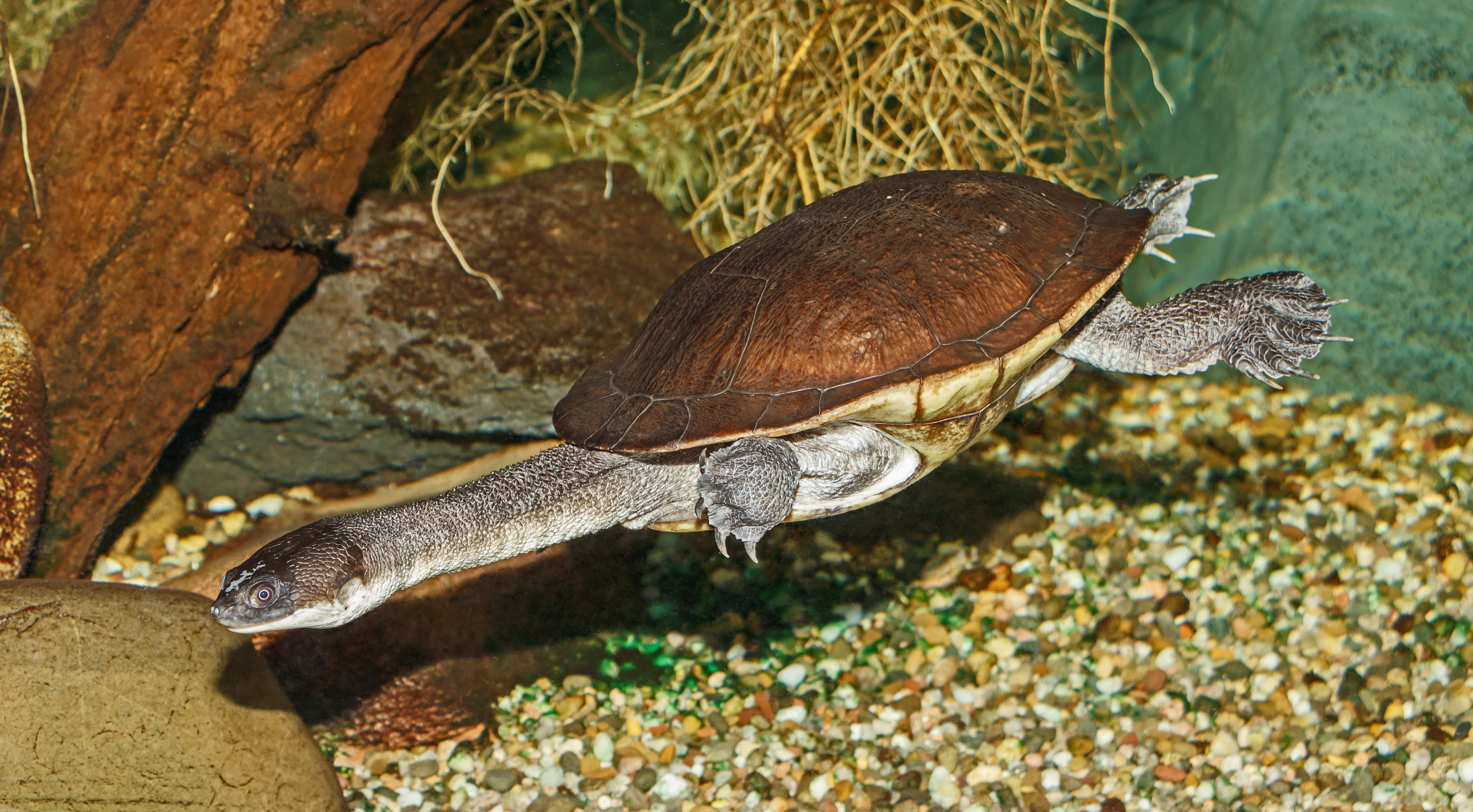
- Roti Island snake-necked turtle

Conservation status
- Critically Endangered (IUCN 3.1)
- CITES Appendix II

Scientific classification
- Kingdom: Animalia
- Phylum: Chordata
- Class: Reptilia
- Order: Testudines
- Suborder: Pleurodira
- Family: Chelidae
- Genus: Chelodina
- Subgenus: Chelodina
- Species: C. mccordi

Binomial name
- Chelodina mccordi Rhodin, 1994

Synonyms
- Chelodina mccordi Rhodin, 1994; Chelodina timorensis McCord et al., 2007

= Roti Island snake-necked turtle =

Species of turtle

The Roti Island snake-necked turtle (Chelodina mccordi), also commonly known as McCord's snakeneck turtle, is a critically endangered turtle species. One of its common names refers to Rote Island in Indonesia, where it was first discovered. Some individuals were later discovered in Timor-Leste, and are considered a distinct subspecies.

== Taxonomy ==
Chelodina mccordi belongs to the genus Chelodina (Australian snake-necked turtles) within the family Chelidae (Austro-South American side-necked turtles).

Chelodina mccordi was originally described from Rote Island but was later split into three subspecies: the nominotypical subspecies Chelodina mccordi mccordi from western Rote, Chelodina mccordi rotensis from eastern Rote, and Chelodina mccordi timorensis from Timor. In a recent paper the eastern Rote form was found to be identical to the western form and they were synonymised. This leaves the species with two subspecies one on Rote Island and one on Timor.

== History ==
The Roti Island snake-necked turtle was split from the New Guinea snake-necked turtle and regarded as distinct species in 1994 after Dr. Anders Rhodin, director of the Chelonian Research Foundation in Lunenburg (Massachusetts), found differences between the two species. The first snake-necked turtles on Rote Island had been discovered in 1891 by George Albert Boulenger.

== Etymology ==
Both the specific name, mccordi, and one of the common names, McCord's snakeneck turtle, are in honor of Dr. William Patrick McCord (born 1950), a veterinarian and turtle expert from Hopewell Junction, New York.

== Description ==
The carapace of Chelodina mccordi can reach a straight length of 18–24 centimetres (7.1–9.4 in). The color of the carapace is a pale grey brown. Occasionally there are also specimens which have a chestnut-coloured hue. The plastron is a pale buff white. The neck, which is nearly as long as the carapace, is dark brown on the upperpart with round tubercles. The underparts of the turtle are light beige. The iris is black surrounded by a white ring.

== Habitat ==
The natural habitat of Chelodina mccordi includes swamps, rice terraces, and small lakes.

== Reproduction ==
Adults of Chelodina mccordi may have up to three breeding periods in a year. A typical clutch consists of eight to fourteen eggs. The size of an egg is 30 mm × 20 mm (1.18 in × 0.79 in) and may weigh 8–10 grams (0.28–0.35 oz). The first hatchlings emerge after incubating for three months, and the last hatchlings leave after four months. Upon emerging, a hatchling's shell is about 28 mm × 20 mm (1.10 in × 0.79 in) and has yellow spots on the plastron, which become darker in a few weeks until the entire plastron becomes almost black. As the juveniles grow, their coloration progressively becomes paler until they finally achieve the color of the adults.

== Threats ==
The Roti Island snake-necked turtle is one of the most desired turtles in the international pet trade. Even before it was scientifically described it was so over-collected that the legal trade was prohibited in 2001 due to its rarity. The two or three remaining populations live in an area of only 70 km^{2} (27 square miles) in the central highlands of Rote Island. It is still illegally captured and it is often offered on markets under the label of the New Guinea snake-necked turtle which is also legally protected. In 2004 it was listed in Appendix II of CITES.

Outside of capture by humans there are few natural threats to this species. There are some reports of predation by feral pigs (Sus scrofa) and loss of habitat, but illegal capture and trade remain the primary threat.
