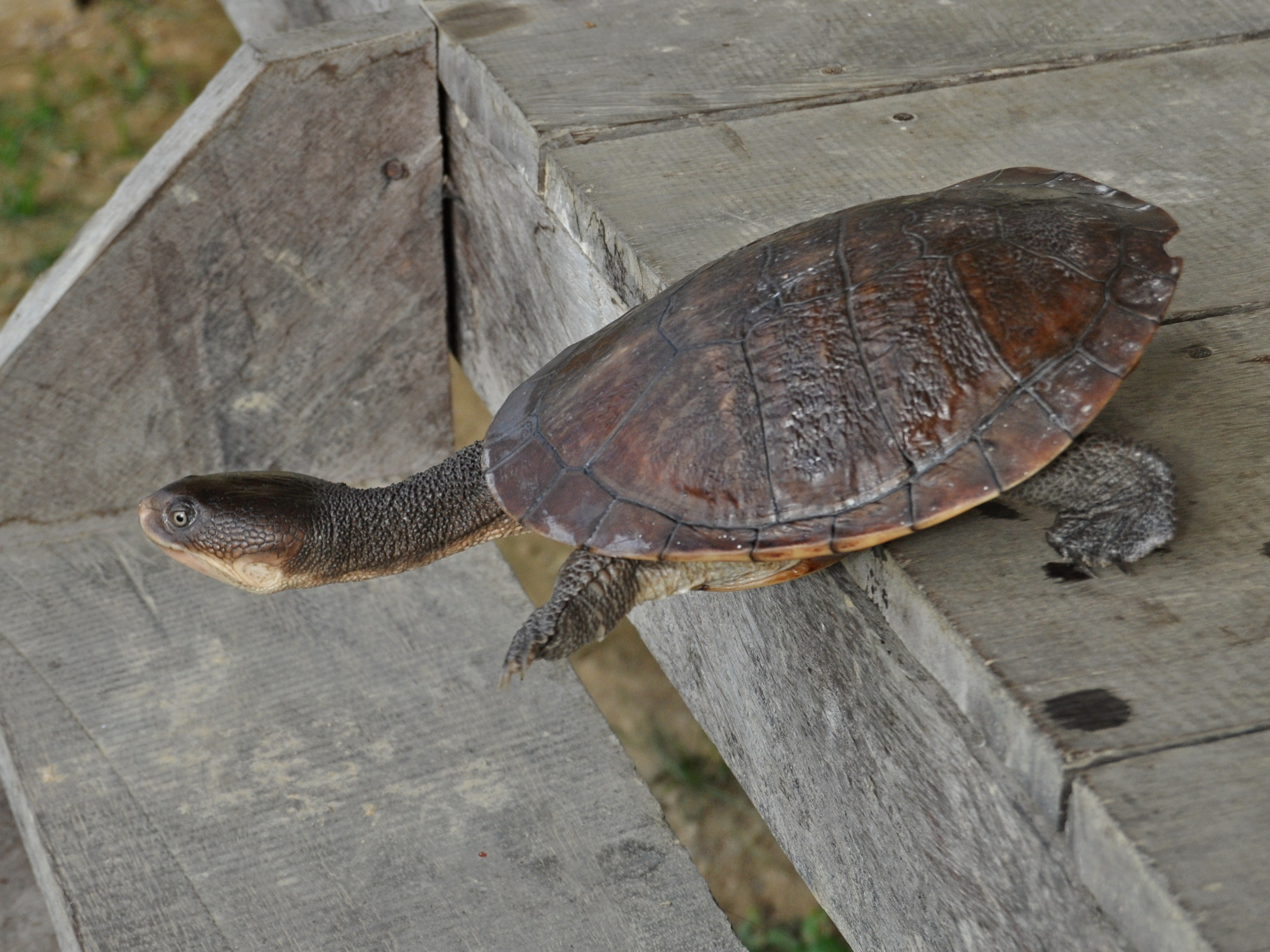

Scientific classification
- Kingdom: Animalia
- Phylum: Chordata
- Class: Reptilia
- Order: Testudines
- Suborder: Pleurodira
- Family: Chelidae
- Genus: Chelodina
- Species: C. gunaleni

Binomial name
- Chelodina gunaleni McCord & Joseph-Ouni, 2007

= Chelodina gunaleni =

Species of turtle

Chelodina gunaleni, commonly known as Gunalen's long-necked turtle and Gunalen's snake-necked turtle, is a species of turtle in the family Chelidae. The species is endemic to the lowlands of west-central West Papua, Indonesia, south of the central ranges.

== Etymology ==
The specific name, gunaleni, is in honor of Indonesian zoologist Danny Gunalen.

== Habitat ==
The preferred natural habitats of C. gunaleni are freshwater rivers and freshwater swamps.

== Reproduction ==
Like all turtles, C. gunaleni is oviparous.
