= Pritchard's snake-necked turtle =

Conservation status
- Vulnerable (IUCN 3.1)

Scientific classification
- Kingdom: Animalia
- Phylum: Chordata
- Class: Reptilia
- Order: Testudines
- Suborder: Pleurodira
- Family: Chelidae
- Genus: Chelodina
- Subgenus: Chelodina
- Species: C. pritchardi

Binomial name
- Chelodina pritchardi Rhodin, 1994

Synonyms
- Chelodina pritchardi Rhodin, 1994; Chelodina (Chelodina) pritchardi — TTWG, 2014

Species of turtle

Pritchard's snake-necked turtle (Chelodina pritchardi) is a species of turtles in the family Chelidae. The species is endemic to a restricted area of Central Province, Papua New Guinea.

== Etymology ==
Both the specific name, pritchardi, and the common name, Pritchard's snake-necked turtle, are in honour of British herpetologist Peter Pritchard.
