= Chelodina kurrichalpongo =

Scientific classification
- Kingdom: Animalia
- Phylum: Chordata
- Class: Reptilia
- Order: Testudines
- Suborder: Pleurodira
- Family: Chelidae
- Genus: Chelodina
- Subgenus: Chelydera
- Species: C. kurrichalpongo

Binomial name
- Chelodina kurrichalpongo (Joseph-Ouni, McCord, Cann & Smales, 2019)

Synonyms
- Macrochelodina kurrichalpongo Joseph-Ouni, McCord, Cann & Smales, 2019

Species of Australian turtle

Chelodina kurrichalpongo, also known as the Darwin snake-necked turtle, is a species of snake-necked turtle that is endemic to Australia. The specific epithet kurrichalpongo refers to the Aboriginal Dreamtime creation myth of the black rock-snake that laid the eggs from which hatched the rainbow snakes that carved the depressions and watercourses in the landscape. The name alludes to the snake-like neck of the turtle, the varied colour-phases of different individuals, and to the rivers and billabongs it inhabits.

== Distribution ==
The species occurs in the tropical Top End of the Northern Territory. The type locality is McMinns Lagoon on the outskirts of Darwin.
