= Aramia River =

River in Papua New Guinea

- Location within Papua New Guinea

Location
- Country: Papua New Guinea
- Region: Western Province

Physical characteristics
- Source
  - location: Papua New Guinea
- Mouth
  - coordinates: 7°53′37″S 143°17′12″E

The Aramia River is a river in southwestern Papua New Guinea.

== Ecology ==
The Aramia and Bamu river basins are the only known habitats of the Aramia snake-necked turtle (Chelodina ipudinapi).

== See also ==
- List of rivers of Papua New Guinea
- Aramia River languages (Gogodala–Suki languages)
