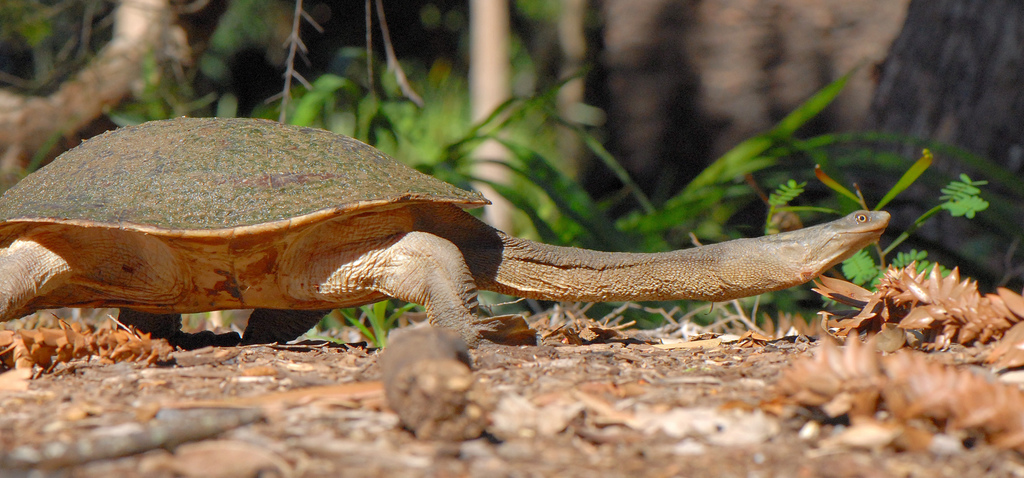
- Brisbane City Botanic Gardens
- Hunting fish at the Bronx Zoo

Conservation status
- Least Concern (IUCN 2.3)

Scientific classification
- Kingdom: Animalia
- Phylum: Chordata
- Class: Reptilia
- Order: Testudines
- Suborder: Pleurodira
- Family: Chelidae
- Genus: Chelodina
- Subgenus: Chelydera
- Species: C. expansa

Binomial name
- Chelodina expansa (Gray, 1857)

Synonyms
- List: Chelodina expansa Gray, 1857; Chelodina expansas Goode, 1967 (ex errore); Chelodina oblonga expansa Blackmore, 1969; Macrochelodina expansa Wells & Wellington, 1985

= Chelodina expansa =

Broad-shelled long-necked turtle

Species of turtle

Chelodina (Chelydera) expansa, commonly known as the giant snake-necked turtle, broad-shelled turtle, broad-shelled river turtle, or broad-shelled snake-necked turtle, is a pleurodiran freshwater turtle within the family Chelidae. It is found in south-eastern and eastern Australia. It is the largest of the long-necked turtles.

== Distribution and habitat ==
Broad-shelled river turtles are found throughout the Murray-Darling basin of southeastern Australia. A number of distinct populations are also found across areas of central and coastal Queensland.

C. expansa is mostly found in turbid waters of depths greater than three metres. It is mostly a river turtle, generally inhabiting permanent streams but is also found in oxbows, ponds in floodplains, backwaters, and swamps. In South Australia, it is only found in the main channel of the Murray River and is almost completely aquatic. It is rarer than the two other freshwater species of turtle found in the river (Emydura macquarii and Chelodina longicollis).

The broad-shelled river turtle will tend to inhabit environments that are undisturbed and have moderate vegetation cover for nest construction. The turtle has shown a preference of aquatic habitats in structured environments, where submerged logs, root systems and dead trees occur. Factors such as shelter from predators and food availability may influence the habitat preference of C. expansa. Seasonal changes including water level and flow may also influence the selected the habitat.

It is widely sympatric with the Murray River turtle and eastern snake-necked turtle.

== Description ==
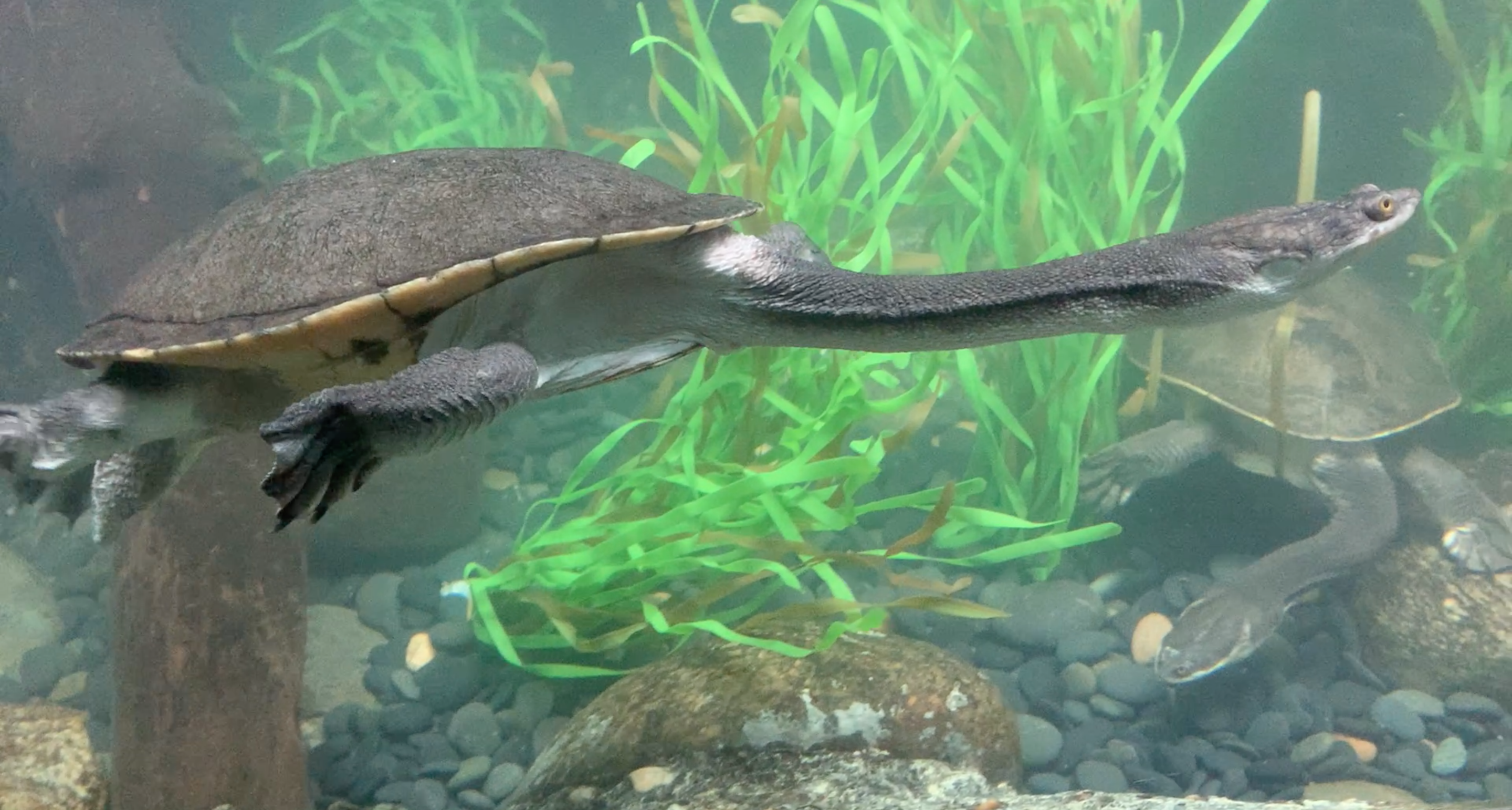
At the Bronx Zoo

C. expansa is the largest of the long-necked turtles. It has a broad, oval, and flattened shell with a length of around 50 cm (20 in). The carapace length is often greater in females than males.

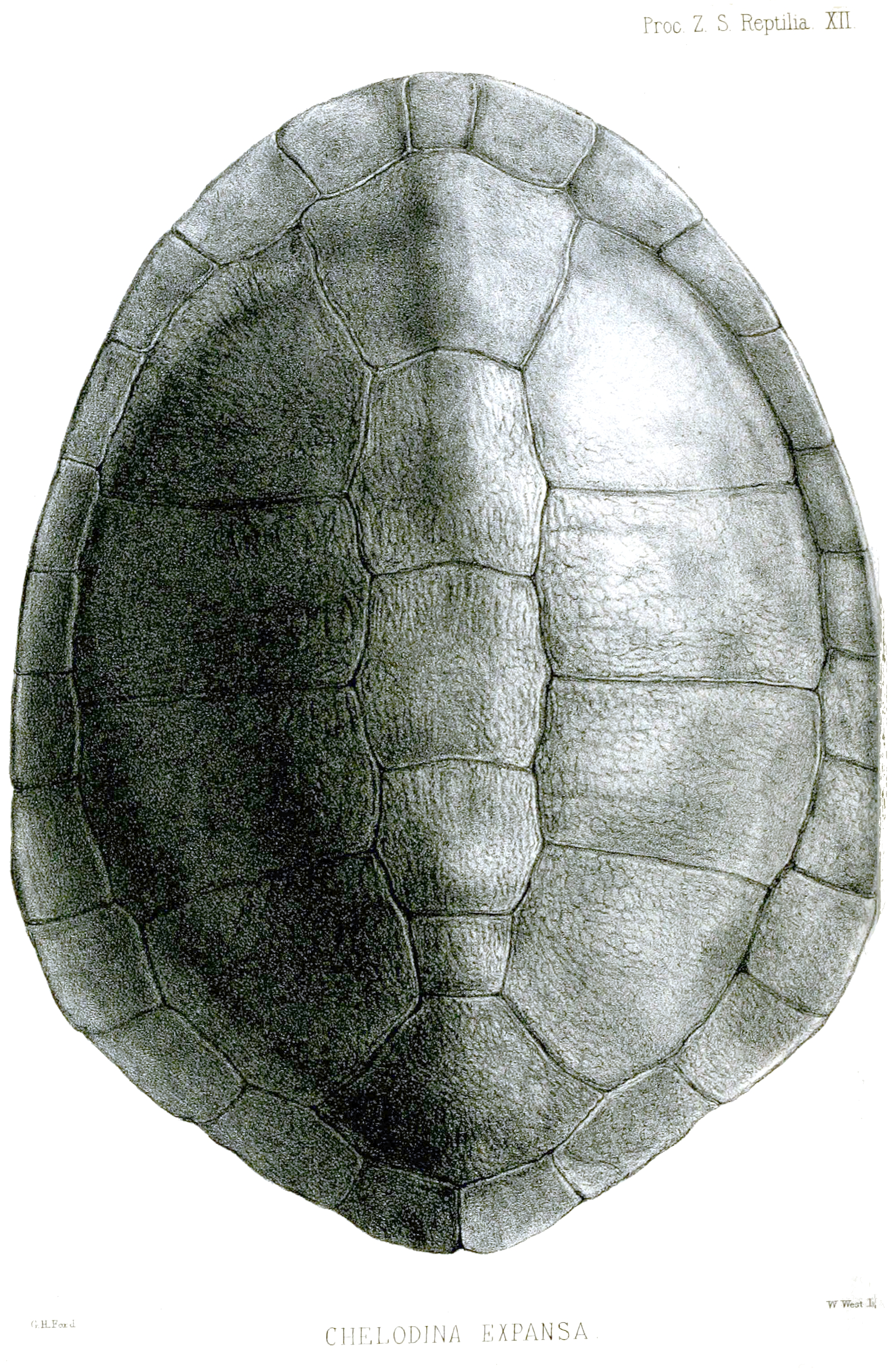
Carapace

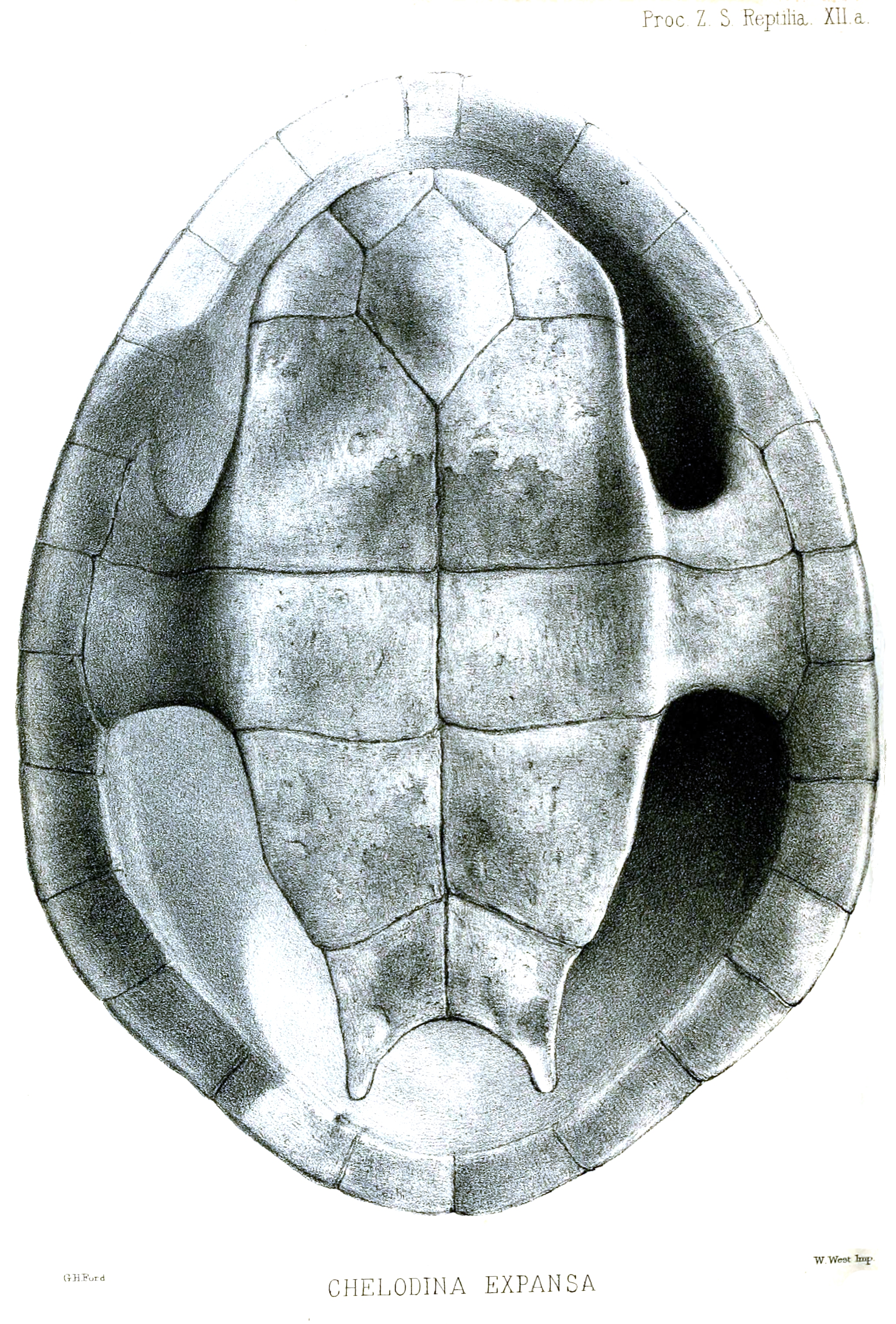
Plastron

The turtle has a rich brown to blackish-brown carapace above, typically displaying fine dark flecks or reticulations, and a whitish or cream-coloured belly. The plastron is narrow and the shell does not display any noticeable expansion anteriorly. The shell is usually twice as long as wide and is broadest at the level of the bridge. The head is broad and highly depressed and the eyes are directly dorsolateral.

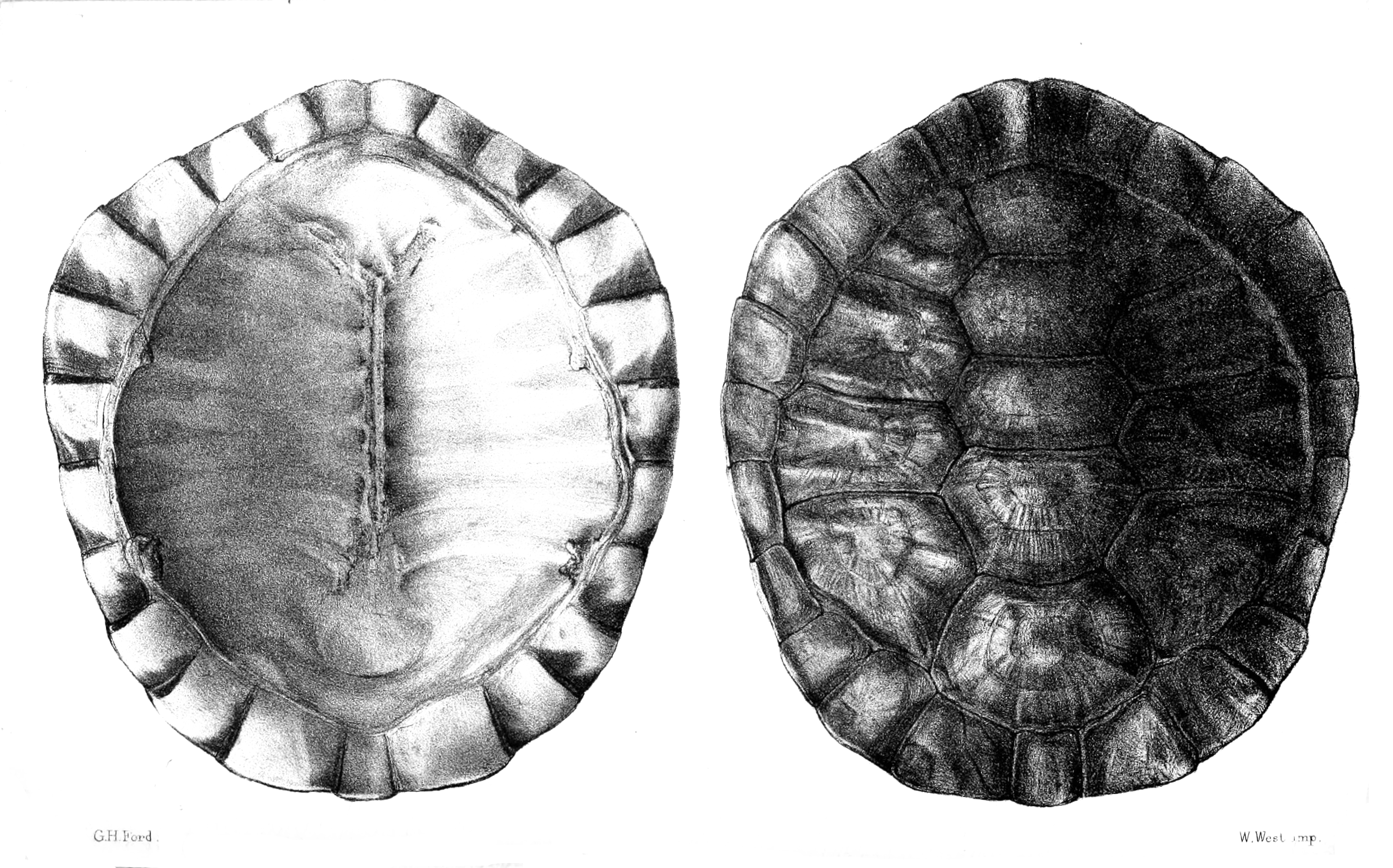
Ventral and dorsal views of juvenile's carapace

When extended, the neck may be longer than the carapace. It has the longest neck relative to the size of its body in the world.

== Behaviour ==
The broad-shelled river turtle is mostly active from the Australian spring season (October) through to early autumn (April). The species tends to decrease in movement and feeding over the cooler winter months. C. expansa is described to also show head bobbing and self-grooming actions.

Chelodina expansa spends most of its time in water. During periods when water levels are low, C. expansa will traverse over land to find other water sources. The turtle may also bury itself into mud and enter extended periods of aestivation until rain occurs and water levels increase.

== Reproduction ==
C. expansa usually nests during Australian autumn or in early winter when soils decrease in temperature. It will also sometimes nest during spring. Although the female broad-shelled river turtle will travel up to one kilometre away from the bank to lay her eggs, it is more common for them to nest within 100 m of the water's edge. Along the Murray River, nests are often constructed at the top of sandy ridges. In Autumn nestings, temperatures in the nest will initially decrease and then remain low during the winter period before slowly increasing during spring to reach a maximum temperature during summer.

The female turtle constructs a nest by excavating a nesting chamber with her hind legs to a depth of around 20 cm. She then deposits between 5 and 28 eggs before backfilling the nest with soil. The broad-shelled river turtle has shown a 'body-slamming' type behaviour when compacting nests. This behaviour results in the formation of a hardened 'plug' which helps to seal the nest. These turtles will nest any time of the day or night with nesting being initiated by rain. Turtles tend to select nest sites that have higher sun coverage. The selection of nest sites is often a long way from the waters edge and this is seen as a behavioural strategy to minimise the risk of nest flooding.

Hatchlings are exposed to a number of challenges. Incubation is exceptionally long due to inherently slow embryonic development, averaging between 324 and 360 days. Development is also delayed when the embryo enters two distinct periods of diapause. The primary diapause occurs inside the female before the eggs are laid. This form of diapause is known as pre-ovipositional embryonic arrest and is found in all turtles. The secondary diapause is triggered by a drop in nest temperature and occurs after embryonic growth has resumed within the nest. The young will generally hatch during spring. Asynchronous hatching is most likely maladaptive in the natural environment. Upon hatching, the young remain in the egg chamber awaiting heavy rain to trigger their release. The soil surrounding the nest, which becomes compacted and relatively hard during the long incubation, is softened by the rains and allows the hatchlings to dig their way out through the softened soil.

== Diet ==
The broad-shelled river turtle is highly specialised and entirely carnivorous. C. expansa primarily preys upon frogs, crustaceans, aquatic insects, and small fish.

== Importance ==
Turtles are an important element of the river ecosystem owing to their feeding on dead fish after a fish kill event, returning ammonia and dissolved oxygen to the river much faster than by natural decomposition (3–6 days vs 25–27 days).

== Conservation ==
C. expansa is listed as vulnerable in South Australia and threatened in Victoria.

=== Threats ===
The introduced red fox (Vulpes vulpes) and ravens (Corvus spp.) are the major threats to the nests of the broad-shelled river turtle. Predation of nests by foxes along the Murray River is in excess of 93%, which means there is little recruitment of young turtles into an ageing population. As turtles are long-lived animals and adults are still commonly seen in the wild, this can lead people to falsely believe that the population is still healthy. Other nest predators include monitor lizards, ibis, and feral pigs. Predation of nests is the main challenge for C. expansa; however, it is thought that the turtle becomes aware of predators, mostly from olfactory and visual signs. Hatchlings face a variety of predators while they travel overland to water; these can include birds and lizards in addition to feral foxes and feral cats. Many young turtles also die from dehydration if they fail to reach the water in time, and some are killed whilst trying to cross roads. Once they reach the water, they may be eaten by fish and other aquatic predators. In the fragmented Queensland populations, the main predator of hatchlings is the spotted barramundi. In South Australia, river system regulation is also considered a threat to freshwater turtles of all kinds in the Murray River.

The broad-shelled river turtle may be infected with adults of the parasitic flatworms D. pearsoni and D. megapharynx. These flukes appear to be host-specific and live in the intestines of C. expansa.

=== Conservation efforts ===
Efforts to protect the species include the use of professional shooters to kill foxes; working with local councils to build nesting islands, and improving monitoring of species. After it was found that freshwater turtle numbers had declined by up to 91 per cent some sections of the Murray, conservation efforts increased, with the Government of South Australia allocating $450,000 to help establish the state's first turtle management plan, dubbed the "Together Understanding and Restoring Turtles in our Landscapes and Ecosystems" (TURTLE) project. A management strategy is being developed in collaboration with First Nations people, for whom the turtles have great cultural significance, along with environmental experts.
