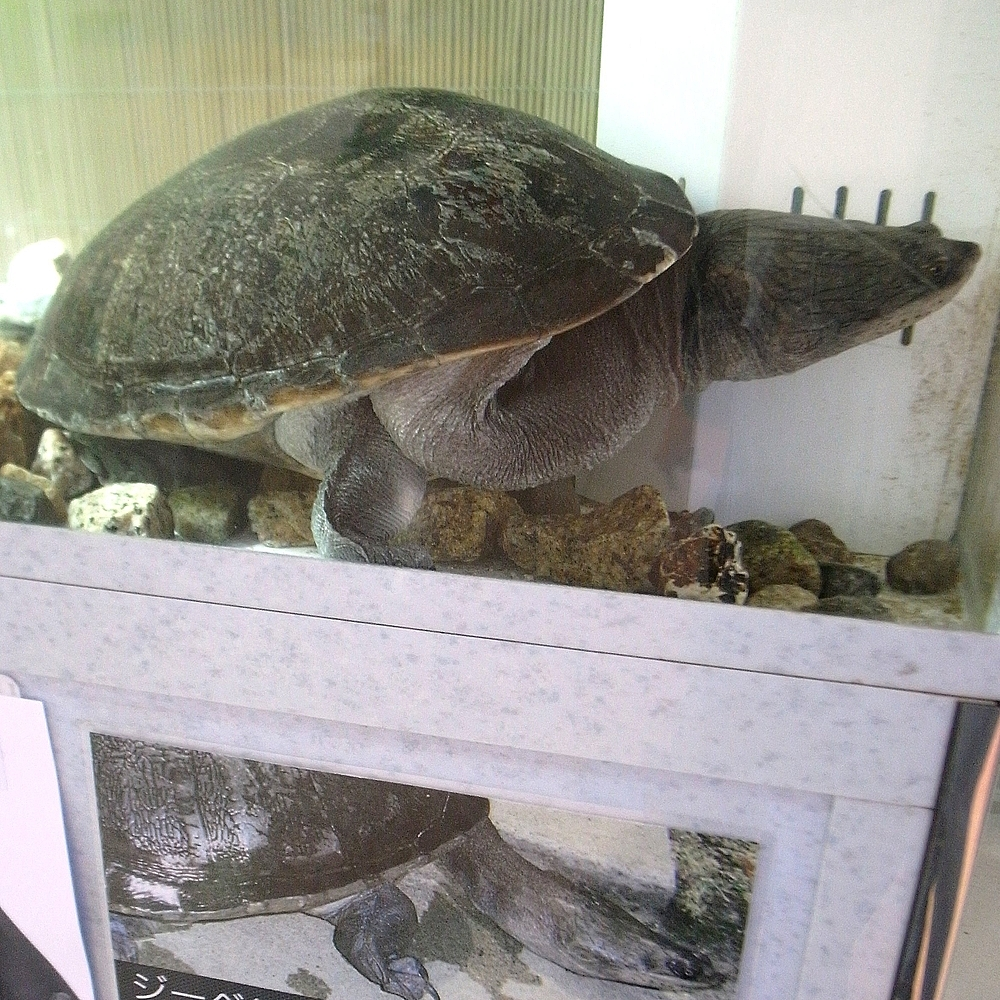

Conservation status
- Not evaluated (IUCN 2.3)

Scientific classification
- Kingdom: Animalia
- Phylum: Chordata
- Class: Reptilia
- Order: Testudines
- Suborder: Pleurodira
- Family: Chelidae
- Genus: Chelodina
- Subgenus: Chelydera
- Species: C. kuchlingi

Binomial name
- Chelodina kuchlingi Cann, 1997

= Chelodina kuchlingi =

Species of turtle

Chelodina (Chelydera) kuchlingi, commonly known as Kuchling's long-necked turtle or Kuchling's turtle, is a species of freshwater turtle in the family Chelidae. The species is endemic to Australia.

== Etymology ==
The specific name, kuchlingi, is in honor of Australian herpetologist Gerald Kuchling.

== Taxonomy ==
Chelodina kuchlingi had been considered the same species as Chelodina rugosa for the last decade, however, the species has been resurrected and is now believed to come from the Northern Kimberley regions of Western Australia, Australia. Evidence it is a species has only recently been published with genetic results taken from the holotype showing it differed by 4% of loci from its nearest relatives. The species is only known from the holotype at this time.

== Biology ==
Little is known about C. kuchlingi, and a number of research projects are underway to evaluate it.
