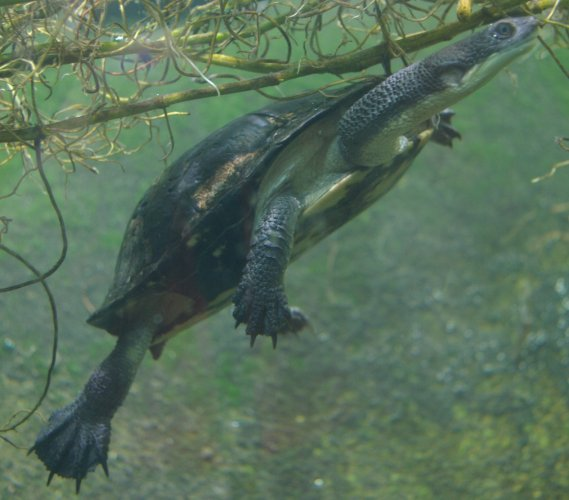
- Australian snake-necked turtle (Chelodina longicollis)

Scientific classification
- Kingdom: Animalia
- Phylum: Chordata
- Class: Reptilia
- Order: Testudines
- Suborder: Pleurodira
- Family: Chelidae
- Subfamily: Chelodininae
- Genus: Chelodina; Fitzinger, 1826

Type species
- Testudo longicollis Shaw, 1794
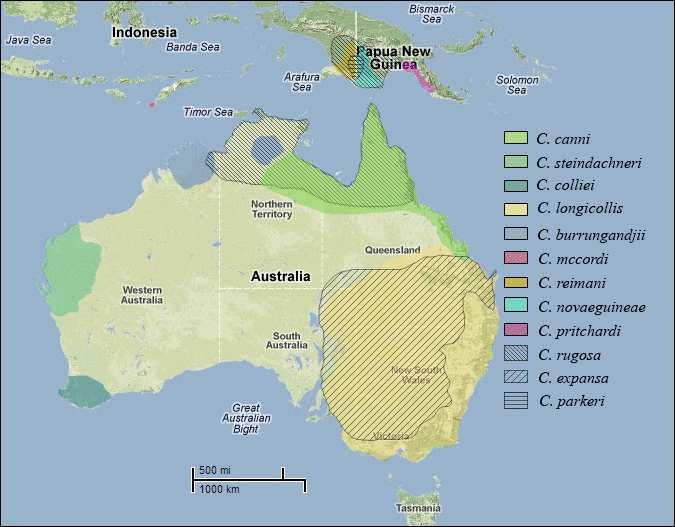

= Chelodina =

Chelodina Temporal range: Eocene–Recent

Genus of turtles

Chelodina, collectively known as snake-necked turtles, is a large and diverse genus of long-necked chelid turtles with a complicated nomenclatural history. Although in the past, Macrochelodina and Macrodiremys have been considered separate genera and prior to that all the same, they are now considered subgenera of the Chelodina, further Macrochelodina and Macrodiremys are now known to apply to the same species, hence Chelydera is used for the northern snake-necked turtles.

Chelodina is an ancient group of chelid turtles native to Australia, New Guinea, the Indonesian Rote Island, and East Timor. The turtles within this subgenus are small to medium-sized with oval shaped carapace. They are side-necked turtles, meaning they tuck their head partially around the side of their body when threatened instead of directly backwards.

Chelydera represents those species that have often been termed the Chelodina B group or thick necked snake neck turtles. The subgenus was described in 2020 by Thomson & Georges (in Shea et al. 2020). They are a side-neck turtle of the family Chelidae with extremely long necks and long flattened heads. They are specialist fish eaters using a strike and gape mode of feeding. They are medium to large species with the largest Chelodina (Chelydera) expansa reaching shell lengths of some 45 cm (18 in). The first fossils (C. (Chelydera) alanrixi) are known from Queensland from the Eocene period (Lapparent de Broin, F. de, & Molnar, R. E., 2001).

Macrochelodina (Wells & Wellington, 1985) is a monotypic subgenus of the Chelodina. Its sole member is the enigmatic Chelodina (Macrochelodina) oblonga from Western Australia.

== Taxonomy ==
Current taxonomy follows that of Georges & Thomson, 2010 with updates from van Dijk et al. 2014 and Shea et al. 2020.

Synonymous names for the Chelodina Fitzinger 1826 genus include: Hydraspis Bell 1828, Chelyodina Agassiz 1846:79 (nomen novum), Hesperochelodina Wells and Wellington 1985 (nomen nudum).

The type species for the Chelodina subgenus is Chelodina longicollis (Shaw, 1794). The type species for the Chelydera subgenus is Chelodina parkeri Rhodin and Mittermeier 1976. The type species for Macrochelodina is Chelodina oblonga Gray 1841.

=== List of species ===
Common name	Scientific name (Note: A binomial authority in parentheses indicates the species was originally described in a genus other than Pelusios.)	IUCN Red List Status	Picture
Subgenus: Chelodina Fitzinger, 1826
Cann's snake-necked turtle	Chelodina canni McCord & Thomson, 2002	LC	The head of Cann's snake-necked turtle
Gunalen's snake-necked turtle	Chelodina gunaleni McCord & Joseph-Ouni, 2007	DD	
Aramia snake-necked turtle	Chelodina ipudinapi Joseph-Ouni, & McCord, 2022		
Eastern long-necked turtle	Chelodina longicollis (Shaw, 1794)	LC	
Roti Island snake-necked turtle McCord's snakeneck turtle	Chelodina mccordi Rhodin, 1994b	CR^{IUCN}	Roti Island snake-necked turtle at Columbus Zoo and Aquarium
New Guinea snake-necked turtle	Chelodina novaeguineae Boulenger, 1888	LC^{IUCN}	
Reimann's snake-necked turtle	Chelodina reimanni Philippen and Grossmann, 1990	NT^{IUCN}	
Pritchard's snake-necked turtle	Chelodina pritchardi Rhodin, 1994a	EN^{IUCN}	
Steindachner's long-necked turtle Dinner-plate turtle	Chelodina steindachneri Siebenrock, 1914	LC	
Subgenus: Chelydera Thomson & Georges, 2020
Arnhem Land long-necked turtle	Chelodina burrungandjii Thomson, Kennett & Georges, 2000	LC	
Giant snake-necked turtle	Chelodina expansa Gray, 1857	LC	
Kuchling's snake-necked turtle	Chelodina kuchlingi Cann, 1997	NE	
Darwin snake-necked turtle	Chelodina kurrichalpongo (Joseph-Ouni, McCord, Cann, & Smales, 2019)	NE	
Parker's snake-necked turtle	Chelodina parkeri Rhodin and Mittermeier, 1976	VU^{IUCN}	
Northern snake-necked turtle North Australian snake-necked turtle	Chelodina rugosa Ogilby, 1890	NT^{IUCN}	
Kimberley long neck turtle	Chelodina walloyarrina	NE	
Subgenus: Macrochelodina Wells & Wellington 1985
Southwestern snake-necked turtle Narrow-breasted snake-necked turtle Oblong turtle	Chelodina oblonga Gray, 1841	NT	

=== Extinct species ===
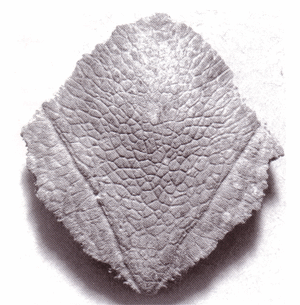
Fossil of Chelodina insculpta

There are three identified extinct species of Chelodina:

- †Chelodina alanrixi de Broin and Molnar, 2001 is a species of snake-necked fossil turtle which was described in 2001 using material gathered in Redbank Plains, Queensland, Australia. It is a member of the Chelidae Pleurodira. The fossil has been dated to the Eocene Epoch.
- †Chelodina aquanimare Joseph-Ouni, Yates & McCord, 2026
- †Chelodina insculpta de Vis, 1897 is an extinct species of snake-necked turtle that was described in 1897 from material gathered in Darling Downs, Queensland, Australia, restricted. It is a member of the Chelidae; Pleurodira. The fossil has been dated as Pliocene to Pleistocene.
- †Chelodina murrayi Yates, 2013 is an extinct species of snake-necked turtle from the Waite Formation on the Alcoota Scientific Reserve, north-east of Alice Springs in the Northern Territory of Australia. The species would appear to belong to the Chelodina novaeguineae group of species within the subgenus Chelodina.
- †Chelodina nerophis Joseph-Ouni, Yates & McCord, 2026
