= Chelodina alanrixi =

Chelodina alanrixi Temporal range: Eocene

Scientific classification
- Domain: Eukaryota
- Kingdom: Animalia
- Phylum: Chordata
- Class: Reptilia
- Order: Testudines
- Suborder: Pleurodira
- Family: Chelidae
- Genus: Chelodina
- Subgenus: Chelydera
- Species: C. alanrixi

Binomial name
- Chelodina alanrixi de Broin and Molnar, 2001

Species of turtle

Chelodina alanrixi is a species of snake-necked fossil turtle which was described in 2001 using material gathered in Redbank Plains, Queensland, Australia. It is a member of the Chelidae Pleurodira. The fossil has been dated to the Eocene Epoch.
