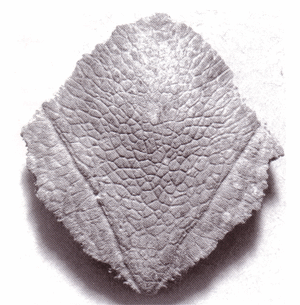
- Holotype of Chelodina insculpta

Scientific classification
- Domain: Eukaryota
- Kingdom: Animalia
- Phylum: Chordata
- Class: Reptilia
- Order: Testudines
- Suborder: Pleurodira
- Family: Chelidae
- Genus: Chelodina
- Subgenus: Chelydera
- Species: C. insculpta

Binomial name
- Chelodina insculpta de Vis 1897

= Chelodina insculpta =

Chelodina insculpta Temporal range: Pliocene

Extinct species of turtle

Chelodina insculpta is an extinct species of snake-necked turtle that was described in 1897 from material gathered in Darling Downs, Queensland, Australia, restricted. It is a member of the Chelidae; Pleurodira. The fossil has been dated as Pliocene to Pleistocene.
