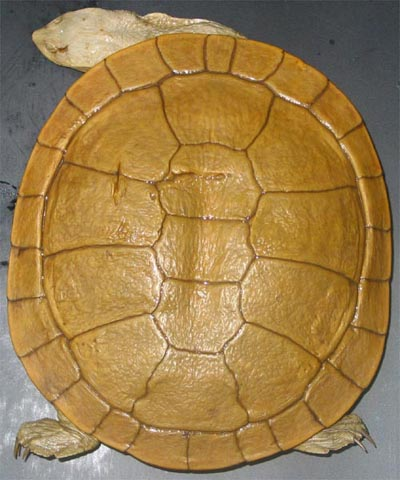
- Dorsal view of the holotype of Chelodina steindachneri

Conservation status
- Least Concern (IUCN 2.3)

Scientific classification
- Kingdom: Animalia
- Phylum: Chordata
- Class: Reptilia
- Order: Testudines
- Suborder: Pleurodira
- Family: Chelidae
- Genus: Chelodina
- Subgenus: Chelodina
- Species: C. steindachneri

Binomial name
- Chelodina steindachneri Siebenrock, 1914

Synonyms
- Chelodina steindachneri Siebenrock, 1914; Chelodina millymillyensis Glauert, 1923; Hesperochelodina steindachneri — Wells & Wellington, 1985; Chelodina steindachneri — Cogger, 2000

= Chelodina steindachneri =

Species of turtle

Chelodina steindachneri, commonly known as the dinner-plate turtle, Steindachner's turtle and or Steindachner's flat-shell turtle, is a species of turtle in the family Chelidae. The species is the least known of the Australian turtles and also one of the smallest members of the long-necked turtles of the genus Chelodina. It is a member of the subgenus Chelodina making it closely related to the Chelodina longicollis group of species.

== Description and types ==
Holotype of Chelodina steindachneri NMW19798
Dorsal view	Ventral view

== Etymology ==
The specific name, steindachneri, is in honor of Austrian herpetologist Franz Steindachner.

== Geographic range ==
C. steindachneri is endemic to the state of Western Australia in Australia.

== Habitat ==
The preferred natural habitats of C. steindachneri are freshwater rivers and freshwater swamps.
