= Reimann's snake-necked turtle =

Conservation status
- Near Threatened (IUCN 3.1)

Scientific classification
- Kingdom: Animalia
- Phylum: Chordata
- Class: Reptilia
- Order: Testudines
- Suborder: Pleurodira
- Family: Chelidae
- Genus: Chelodina
- Subgenus: Chelodina
- Species: C. reimanni

Binomial name
- Chelodina reimanni Philippen & Grossman, 1990

Synonyms
- Chelodina reimanni Philippen & Grossmann, 1990; Chelodina novaeguineae reimanni — Artner, 2003

Species of turtle

Reimann's snake-necked turtle (Chelodina reimanni) is a species of turtle in the family Chelidae. The species is endemic to Oceania and Southeast Asia.

== Geographic range ==
C. reimanni is found primarily in Merauke Regency and Yos Sudarso Island of Indonesia, and possibly also in adjacent areas of Papua New Guinea.

== Description ==
Pictures of C. reimanni consistently denote a smiling face.

== Habitat ==
These turtles are native to western Irian to southwestern Papua New Guinea. They mainly live in marshy freshwater swamp like habitats. They eat mollusks, crayfish and insects. They have also been found to easily breed in captivity when they have warmth, water, protein rich foods, and a nesting area.

== Conservation ==
Reimann's snake-necked turtle has been added to The World Conservation Union's red list of near threatened species.

== Etymology ==
The specific name, reimanni, is in honor of herpetologist Michael J. Reimann.
