= Chelodina walloyarrina =

Kimberley long neck turtle

Scientific classification
- Kingdom: Animalia
- Phylum: Chordata
- Class: Reptilia
- Order: Testudines
- Suborder: Pleurodira
- Family: Chelidae
- Genus: Chelodina
- Subgenus: Chelydera
- Species: C. walloyarrina

Binomial name
- Chelodina walloyarrina McCord and Joseph-Ouni 2007

Species of turtle

Chelodina (Chelydera) walloyarrina, the Kimberley long neck turtle or Kimberley snake-necked turtle, is a large species of long neck turtle endemic to the Kimberley region of Western Australia. In recent years, it has been unclear as to whether this was a valid species or not. It has been recognised as such by the 2017 and 2021 editions of the Turtle Checklist. In a recent paper it was listed as a subspecies of Chelodina burrungandjii by Kehlmaier et al. 2019, however, that publication did not actually assess the type of the species nor did it analyse it. Hence it should be considered a full species.
