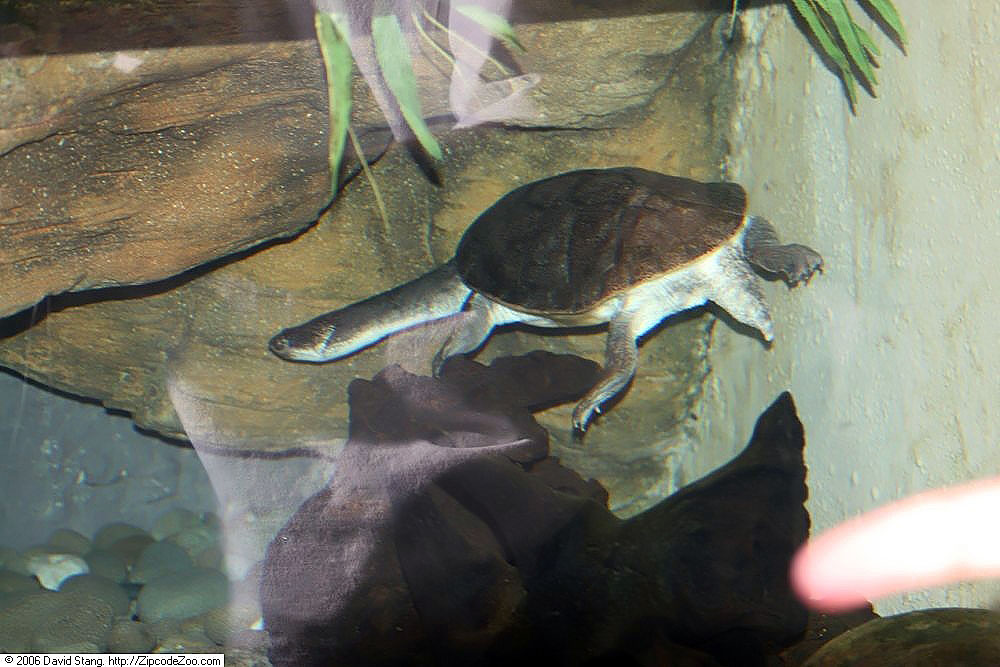

Conservation status
- Near Threatened (IUCN 3.1)

Scientific classification
- Kingdom: Animalia
- Phylum: Chordata
- Class: Reptilia
- Order: Testudines
- Suborder: Pleurodira
- Family: Chelidae
- Genus: Chelodina
- Subgenus: Chelydera
- Species: C. parkeri

Binomial name
- Chelodina parkeri Rhodin & Mittermeier, 1976

Synonyms
- Chelodina parkeri Rhodin & Mittermeier, 1976; Macrochelodina parkeri — Iverson, Thomson & Georges, 2001; Chelodina (Macrochelodina) parkeri — Georges & Thomson, 2010

= Parker's snake-necked turtle =

Species of turtle

Parker's snake-necked turtle (Chelodina parkeri) is a species of turtle in the family Chelidae.

== Etymology ==
The specific name, parkeri, is in honor of Australian naturalist Fred Parker (born 1941).

== Taxonomy ==
Chelodina parkeri is the type species for the recently described subgenus Chelydera.

== Local name ==
Parker's snake-necked turtle is called kunkakta in the Suki and Arammba languages of southwestern Papua New Guinea.

== Geographic range ==
Chelodina parkeri is endemic to the Fly River area of Western Province, Papua New Guinea.
