= Kalala Station =

Pastoral lease in the Northern Territory

Coordinates: 16°11′7″S 133°19′38″E

Location in Northern Territory

Kalala Station is a pastoral lease that operates as a cattle station in the Northern Territory of Australia.

== Location ==
The property is situated approximately 10 km (6.2 mi) north west of Daly Waters and 150 km (93 mi) north of Elliott and 280 km (170 mi) south of Katherine in the Roper Gulf Region of the Northern Territory.

== Description ==
The property has an area of 3,760 km^{2} (1,450 sq mi) and has double frontage to the Stuart Highway and is composed of a mix of black soil country with areas of arable red country. In 2019 it was carrying a herd of around 35,000 head of Brahman cattle.

== History ==
The property was acquired by the Langenhoven family in 2019 for A$$58 million, the family had also recently acquired McMinn Station and the neighbouring Big River Station. The property was sold to them by the Murphy family who had owned it since 2005.

The property was initially established Nelson Bunker Hunt, a Texan billionaire who both owned and operated the station in the 1960s and 1970s. The Beebe brothers, Mick and Roy, acquired the property from Hunt in the late 1970s and made many significant improvements until they sold to the Murphys in 2005 who continued to invest in more infrastructure.

== See also ==
- List of ranches and stations
