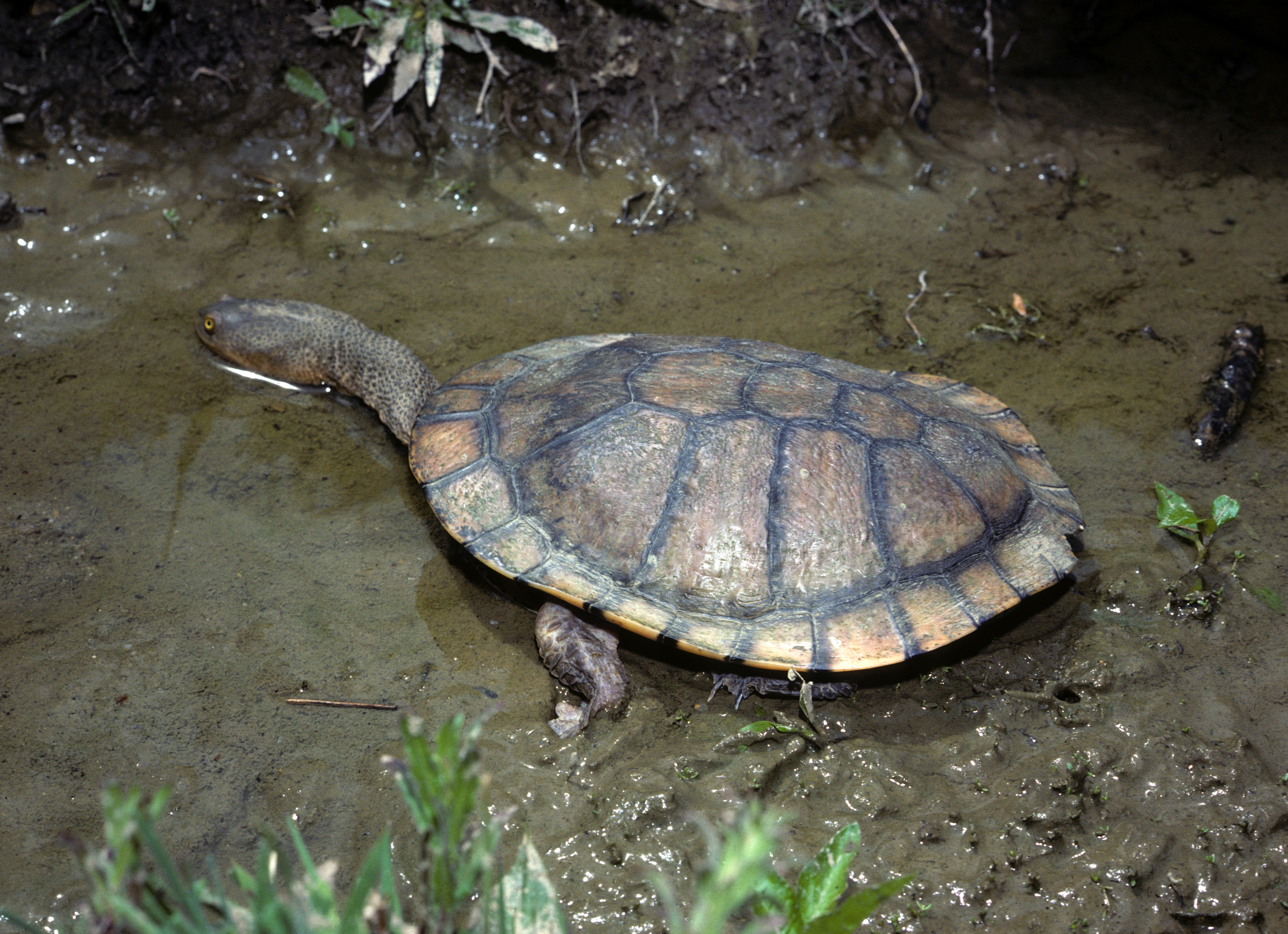

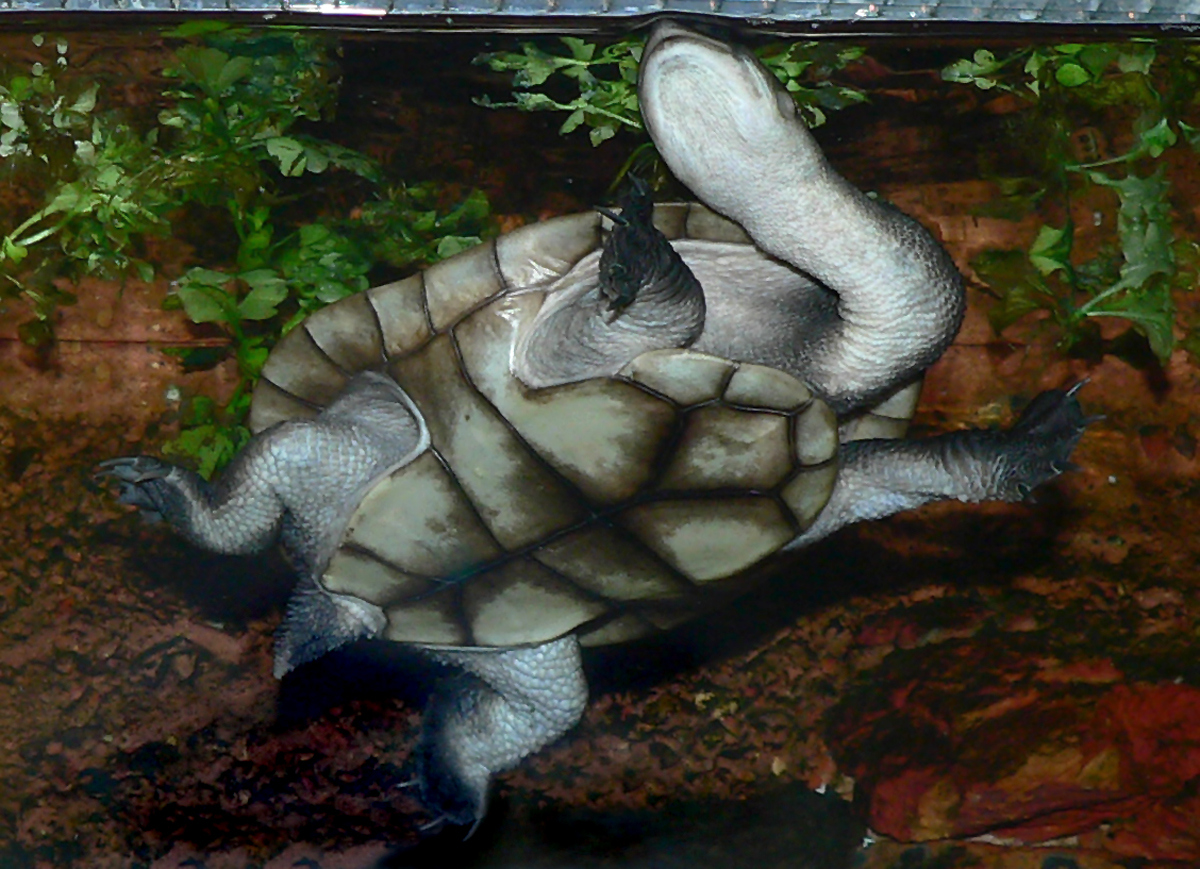
- Ventral view of female

Scientific classification
- Kingdom: Animalia
- Phylum: Chordata
- Class: Reptilia
- Order: Testudines
- Suborder: Pleurodira
- Family: Chelidae
- Genus: Chelodina
- Species: C. longicollis

Binomial name
- Chelodina longicollis (Shaw, 1794)

Synonyms
- Testudo longicollis Shaw, 1794; Chelodina novaehollandiae A.M.C. Duméril & Bibron, 1835; Chelodina sulcata Gray, 1856; Chelodina sulcifera Gray, 1856

= Eastern long-necked turtle =

Species of turtle

The eastern long-necked turtle (Chelodina longicollis), also known commonly as the common long-necked turtle and the common snake-necked turtle, is an eastern Australian species of freshwater snake-necked turtle in the family Chelidae. The species inhabits a wide variety of water bodies and is an opportunistic feeder. It is a side-necked turtle (Pleurodira), meaning that it bends its head sideways into its shell rather than pulling it directly back.

== Geographic distribution ==
Chelodina longicollis is found throughout southeastern Australia, where it is found west of Adelaide (South Australia) eastwards throughout Victoria, the Northern Territory, and New South Wales, and northwards to the Fitzroy River of Queensland. Where Chelodina longicollis comes in contact with Chelodina canni the two species freely hybridise, exhibiting hybrid vigour in the Styx River Drainage of Queensland. C. longicollis has been introduced to Tasmania, likely via the pet trade.

Chelodina longicollis has also been introduced to the Perth and Albany metropolitan areas of southwestern Australia, where it is known to hybridise with the local oblong turtle (Chelodina oblonga). This is again likely due to long-lived pets being released into wetlands or lakes, where the non-local species is able to survive.

The wide distribution of the eastern long-necked turtle has allowed it to tolerate climates that are far colder than those that most other pleurodire turtles occur in, including southerly and high-altitude temperate climates. In 2023, a high-altitude long-necked turtle from the New England Tablelands was found brumating in a pool that had completely frozen for 15 days during the winter, marking the first documented case of a pleurodire turtle overwintering under ice.

== Description ==
The carapace of Chelodina longicollis is generally black in colour, though some may be brown. It is broad and flattened with a deep medial groove. The scutes are edged in black in those individuals with a lighter background colour. The plastron is also very broad and is cream to yellow in colour with sutures edged in black. The neck is long and narrow, typical of the subgenus Chelodina, and reaches a length of approximately 60% of the carapace length. The neck has numerous small pointed tubercles and is grey to black in colour dorsally, cream below, as is the narrow head. Females tend to grow to larger sizes and have deeper bodies. The maximum sizes recorded for females and males vary throughout the geographic range; in river environments of the Murray River it has a straight-line carapace length of 28.2 cm (11.1 in) and 24.9 cm (9.8 in) respectively, whereas in the Latrobe Valley it is 21.6 cm (8.5 in) and 18.8 cm (7.4 in) respectively. It is thought this is linked to productivity of the local environment.

When it feels threatened, this turtle will emit an offensive-smelling fluid from its musk glands. This trait gives the turtle one of its other common names, "stinker".

== Diet ==
The eastern long-necked turtle is carnivorous, eating a variety of animals. This includes insects, worms, tadpoles, frogs, small fish, crustaceans, molluscs, plankton, and carrion.

== Life cycle ==
Females of Chelodina longicollis take 10 years to reach maturity.

In early summer, the female will lay between two and ten eggs in the banks of her aquatic habitat. Three to five months later the hatchlings break out of their shells. These young turtles often fall prey to predators such as fish and birds. Females will lay one to three clutches of eggs per year.

== Importance ==
Turtles are an important element of the river ecosystem owing to their feeding on dead fish after a fish kill event, returning ammonia and dissolved oxygen to the river much faster than by natural decomposition (3–6 days vs 25–27 days).

== Conservation ==
The species Chelodina longicollis is not listed under the Commonwealth EPBC Act nor any state conservation laws.

In South Australia, foxes predate on the eggs in the turtle nests, and may eat the turtles as well. In addition, river system regulation and roadkill are also considered threats to freshwater turtles of all kinds in the Murray River. Efforts to protect the species include the use of professional shooters to kill foxes; working with local councils to build nesting islands, and improving monitoring of species. After it was found that freshwater turtle numbers had declined by up to 91 per cent some sections of the Murray, conservation efforts increased, with the Government of South Australia allocating $450,000 to help establish the state's first turtle management plan, dubbed the "Together Understanding and Restoring Turtles in our Landscapes and Ecosystems" (TURTLE) project. A management strategy is being developed in collaboration with First Nations people, for whom the turtles have great cultural significance, along with environmental experts.

== Gallery ==
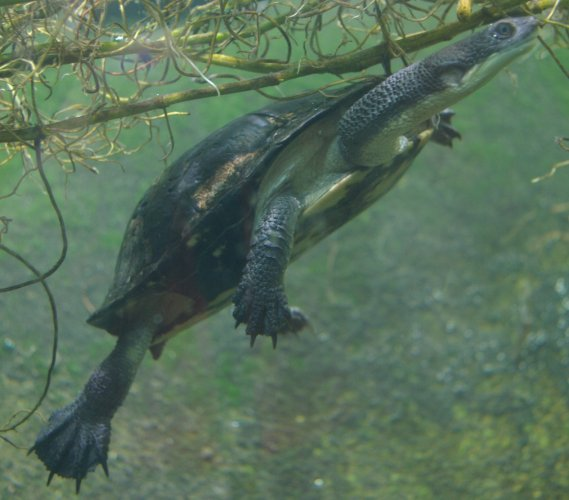
At the National Zoo in Washington, D.C., U.S.A.

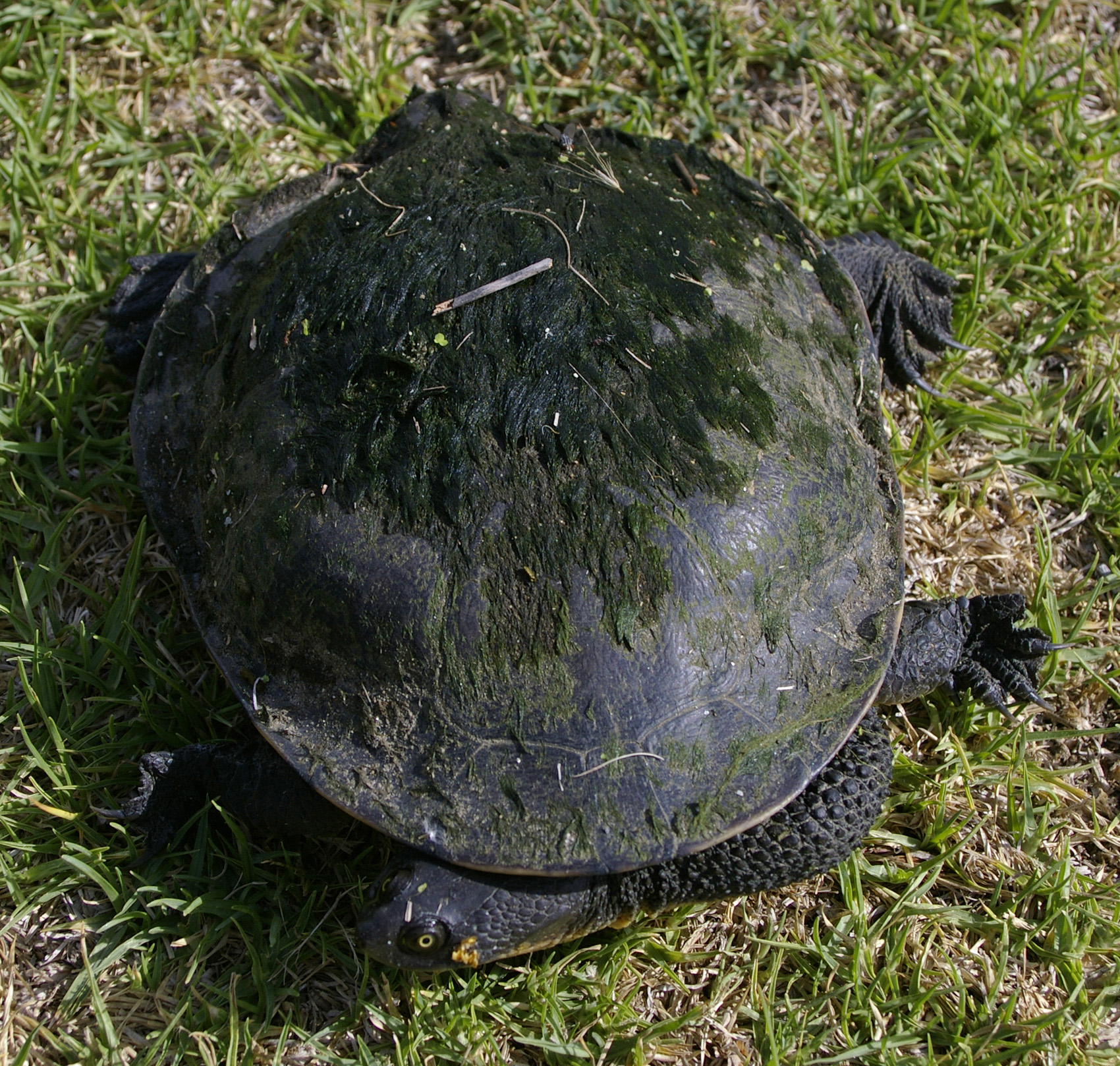
Neck bent sideways into its shell

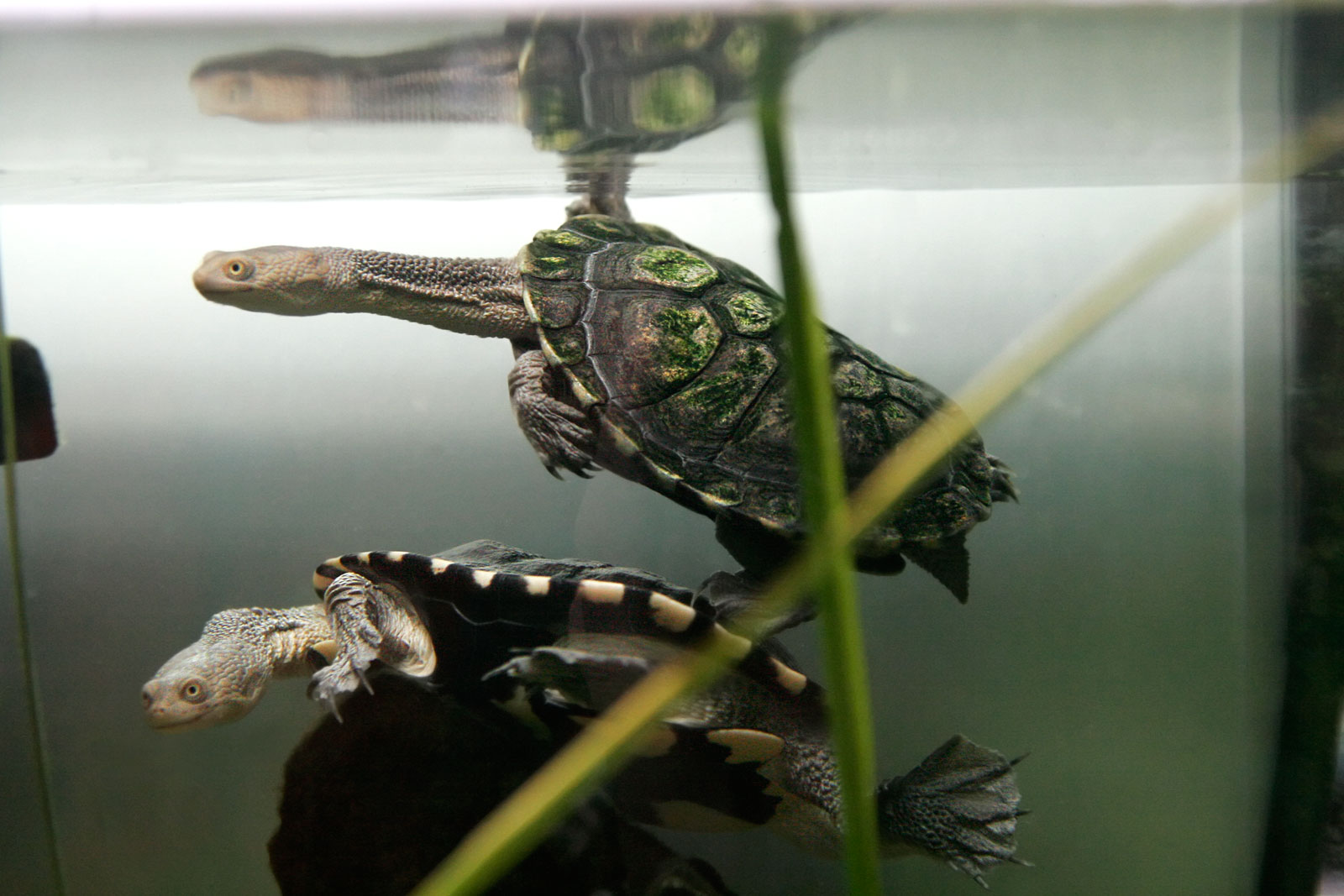
In an aquarium

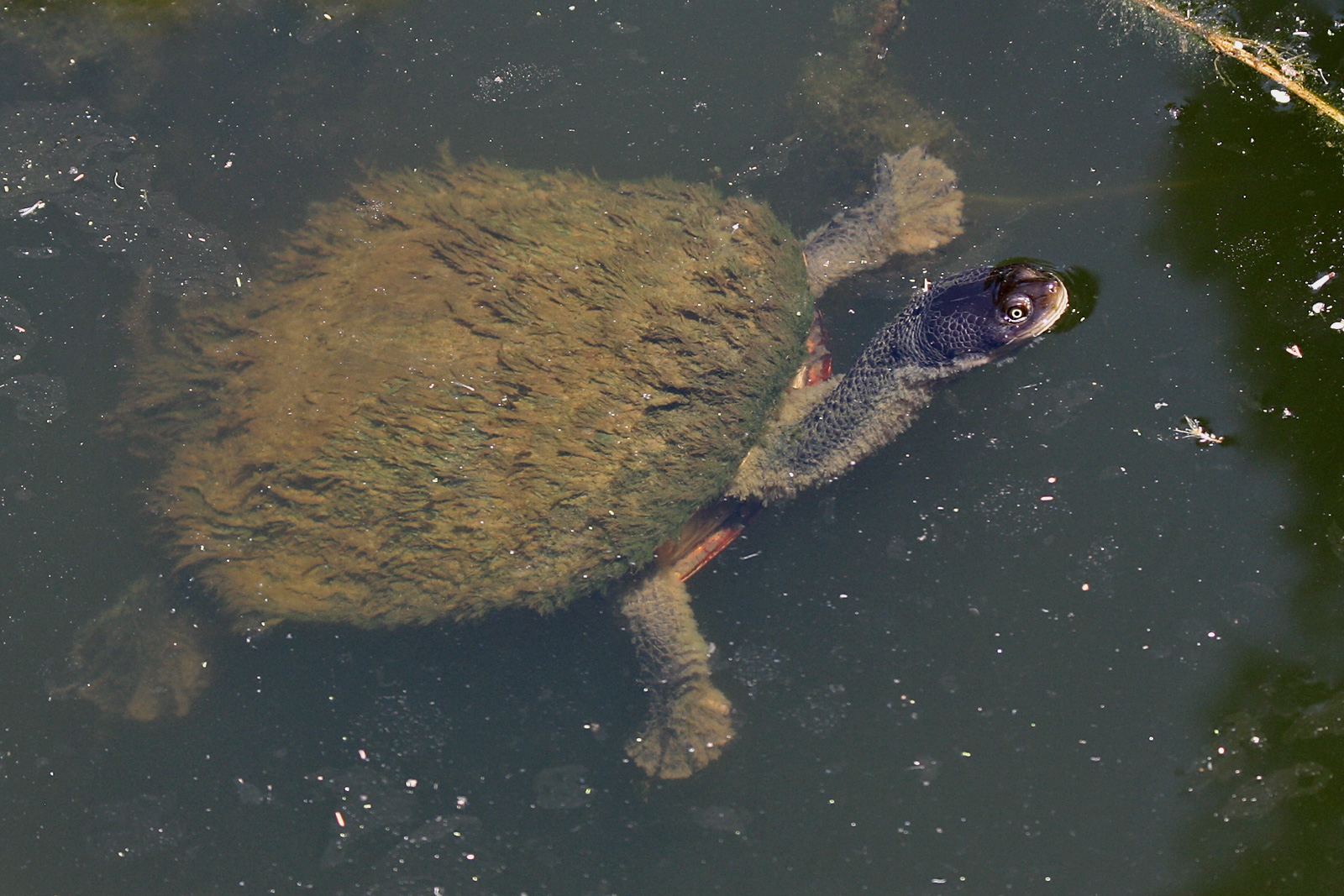
Covered in algae, Victoria, Australia

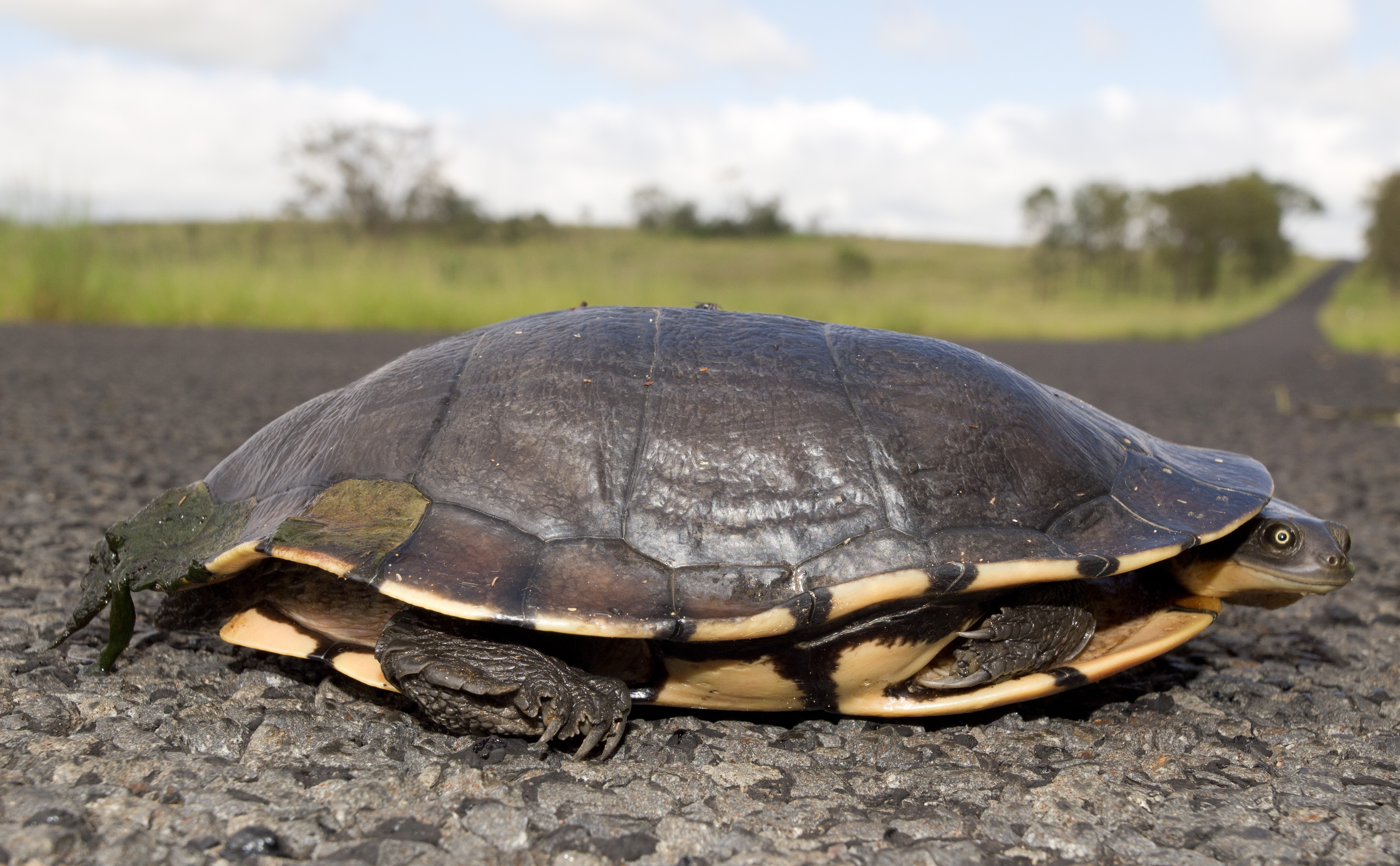
Peering from its shell, Carnarvon National Park, Queensland, Australia
