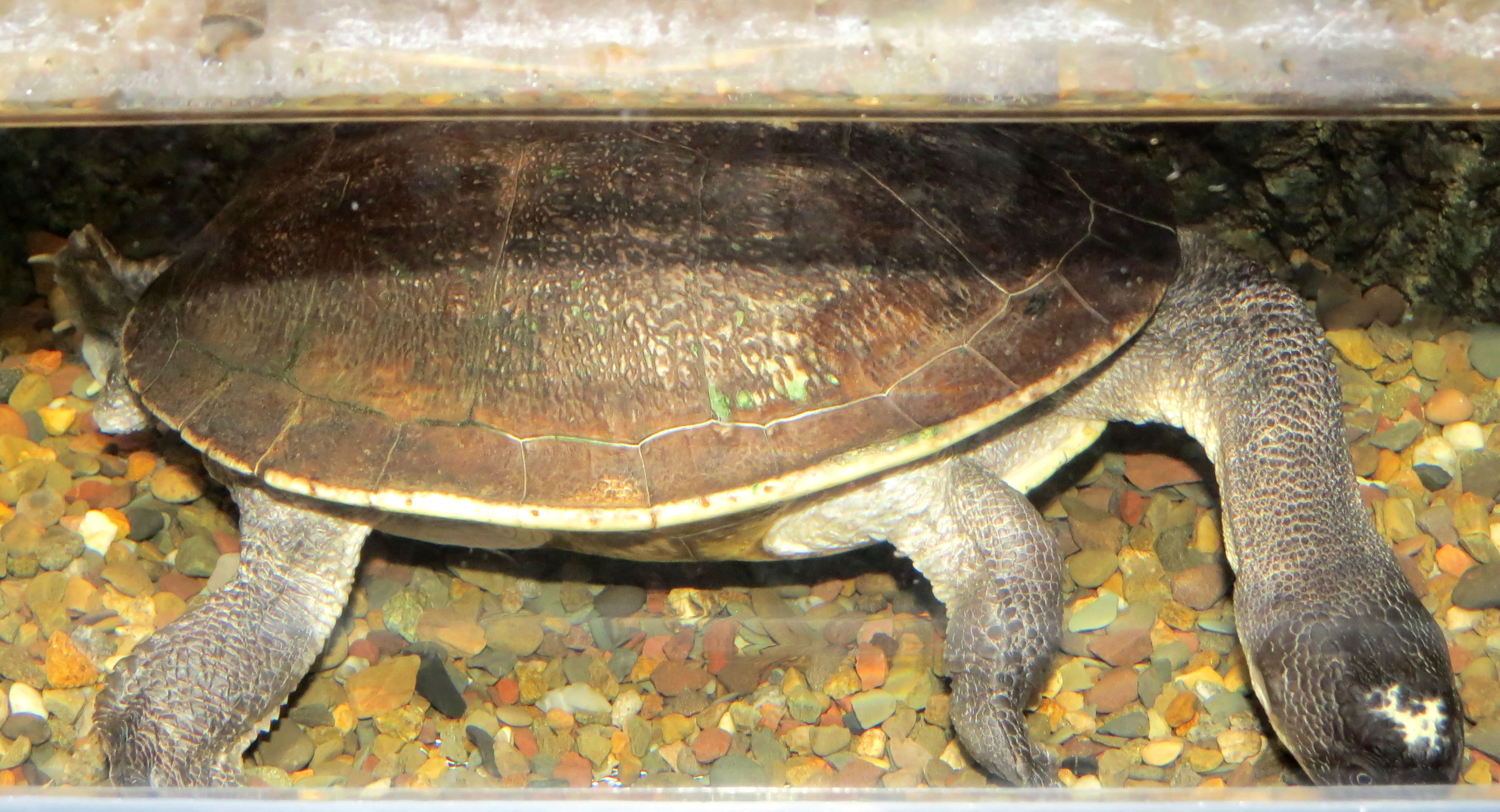

Conservation status
- Least Concern (IUCN 2.3)

Scientific classification
- Kingdom: Animalia
- Phylum: Chordata
- Class: Reptilia
- Order: Testudines
- Suborder: Pleurodira
- Family: Chelidae
- Genus: Chelodina
- Subgenus: Chelodina
- Species: C. novaeguineae

Binomial name
- Chelodina novaeguineae Boulenger, 1888

Synonyms
- Chelodina novaeguineae Boulenger, 1888; Chelodina novawquineae Nutaphand, 1979 (ex errore); Chelodina novaeguinea Wells & Wellington, 1984 (ex errore); Chelodina novaeguinae Orenstein, 2001 (ex errore); Chelodina novaeguineae novaeguineae — Artner, 2003; Chelodina novaguineae Georges & Thomson, 2006 (ex errore)

= New Guinea snake-necked turtle =

Species of turtle

The New Guinea snake-necked turtle (Chelodina novaeguineae) is a species of turtle in the family Chelidae. The species is found almost exclusively within Western Province, Papua New Guinea.

== Habitat ==
C. novaeguineae inhabits small and large freshwater bodies of water, jungle rivers with ample vegetation.

== Description ==
The carapace is dark brown, almost black, but shows some variation from "normal" turtle patterns. The plastron is a light brown, tan color. C. novaeguineae has a long neck, which (including the head) can sometimes exceed the length of the carapace. The skin is mostly gray, except for black on the head, and white on the underparts.

== Behavior ==
When resting, C. novaeguineae twists its long neck off to the side for protection. The highly flexible neck permits foraging in mud as well as snorkeling. It also allows the turtle to strike quickly to capture prey.

== Reproduction ==
The New Guinea snake-necked turtle is oviparous. 17–21 eggs are laid and incubation lasts 75–110 days depending on temperature.
