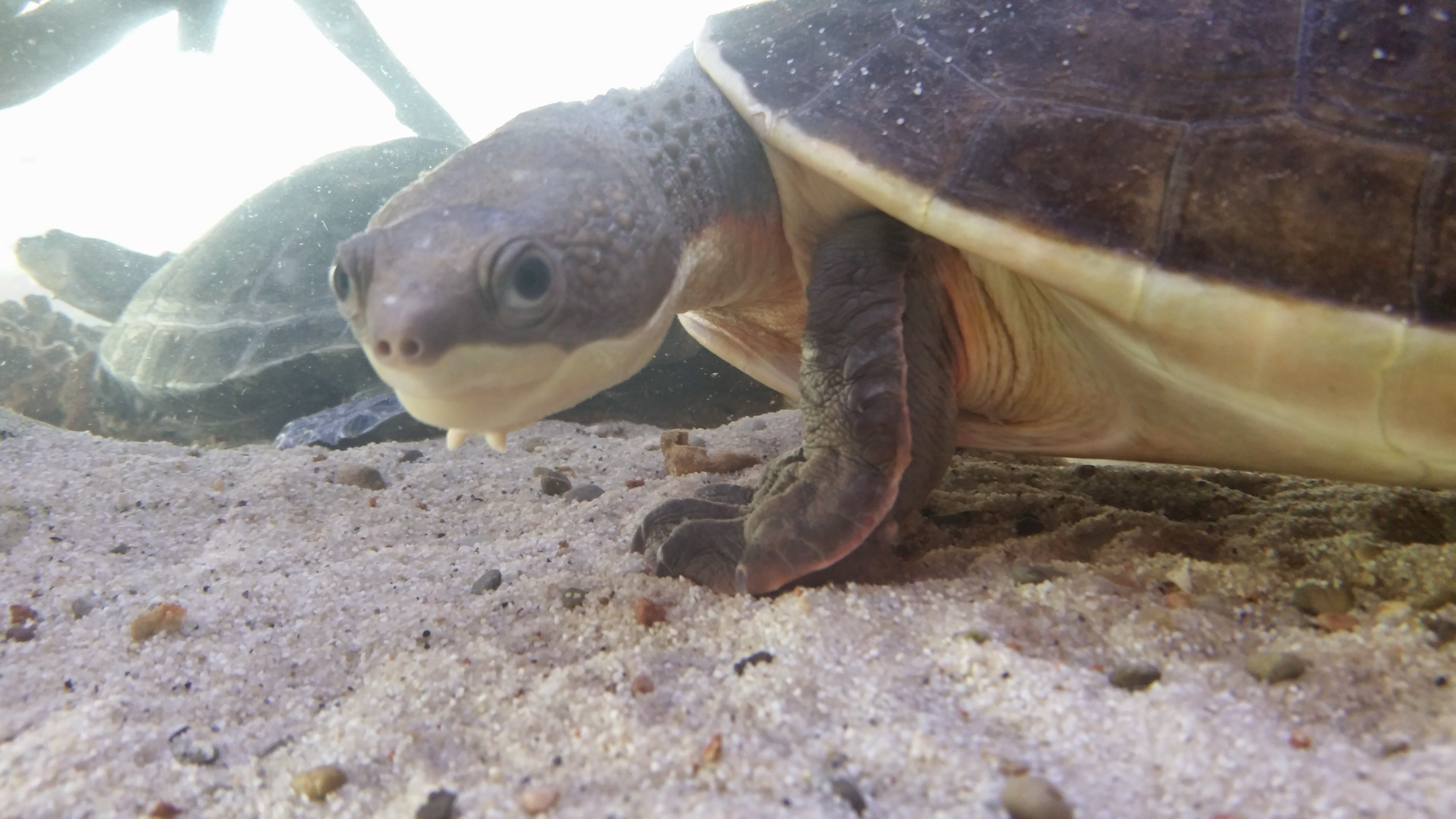
- Elseya branderhorsti, 8-year-old male

Conservation status
- Vulnerable (IUCN 2.3)

Scientific classification
- Kingdom: Animalia
- Phylum: Chordata
- Class: Reptilia
- Order: Testudines
- Suborder: Pleurodira
- Family: Chelidae
- Genus: Elseya
- Subgenus: Elseya
- Species: E. branderhorsti

Binomial name
- Elseya branderhorsti (Ouwens, 1914)

Synonyms
- Emydura branderhorsti Ouwens, 1914; Elseya branderhorsti — Bour, Buskirk & Pritchard, 1994 in David, 1994; Elseya branderhorstii [sic] van Dijk, 2000 (ex errore); Elseya branderhosti [sic] Iskandar & Mumpuni, 2002 (ex errore)

= Elseya branderhorsti =

Species of New Guinea turtle

Elseya branderhorsti, also known commonly as Branderhorst's turtle and Branderhorst's snapping turtle, is a species of freshwater turtle in the family Chelidae. The species is endemic to southern New Guinea, in West Papua Indonesia and Western Province of Papua New Guinea. Until recently it has been a confusing species due to its lost holotype and its sympatry with another, undescribed, species. E. branderhorsti is currently listed as Vulnerable on the IUCN RedList in part due to its vulnerability to the Asian turtle trade.

== Etymology ==
The specific name, branderhorsti, is in honor of Dutch physician Bastiaan Branderhorst (born 1880).

== Taxonomy ==
A neotype was recently defined for E. branderhorsti in order to clarify its taxonomic issues, and this neotype is now the name bearing type for the species. In their paper, Thomson and colleagues went through the entire collection history, as best as is known, and restricted the type locality of the species to "southeastern Papua, Indonesia, between the Lorentz River and Merauke", and the neotype was obtained from this region. The neotype is lodged with the Papua New Guinea National Museum. This type has been identified as being the same species originally described by Ouwens in 1914. The closest relatives of E. branderhorsti are E. dentata and E. flaviventralis, both of northern Australia. These three species together comprise the subgenus Elseya.

== Description ==
E. branderhorsti is a large river turtle that can be most readily distinguished from E. rhodini, with which it is sympatric, by the following three characters: the absence of a cervical scute; the presence of a prominent head shield that does not extend down the parietal arch to the tympanum; and by the presence of a distinctive alveolar ridge. As an adult it has a very large, broadly oval shell, often greater than 40 cm (16 in) in straight carapace length, that is dark brown to black on the carapace and cream on the plastron. The iris is indistinct giving it the appearance of no distinctive features in the eye, often referred to as "liquid" eyes.

== Habitat ==
The preferred natural habitat of E. branderhorsti is freshwater rivers and swamps.

== Human consumption ==
The meat and internal organs of E. branderhorsti, which is prized for its large size, are regularly consumed by local peoples. The clean white plastra of juvenile E. branderhorsti are heavily harvested for traditional Chinese medicine.
