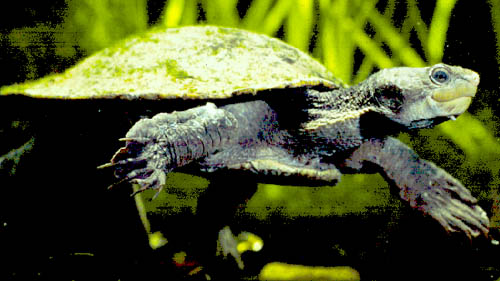
- Elseya lavarackorum

Conservation status
- Endangered (EPBC Act)

Scientific classification
- Kingdom: Animalia
- Phylum: Chordata
- Class: Reptilia
- Order: Testudines
- Suborder: Pleurodira
- Family: Chelidae
- Genus: Elseya
- Subgenus: Pelocomastes
- Species: E. lavarackorum

Binomial name
- Elseya lavarackorum (White & Archer, 1994)

Synonyms
- See text

= Gulf snapping turtle =

Species of turtle

The Gulf snapping turtle or Lavaracks' turtle (Elseya lavarackorum) is a large species of freshwater turtle in the sidenecked family Chelidae. The species is endemic to northern Australia in northwest Queensland and northeast Northern Territory. The species, similar to other members of the Australian snapping turtles in genus Elseya, only comes ashore to lay eggs and bask. The Gulf snapping turtle is a herbivore and primarily consumes Pandanus and figs.

== Etymology ==
The specific name, lavarackorum (genitive plural), is in honor of Australian paleontologists Jim Lavarack and Sue Lavarack who discovered the fossil remains of this species.

== Taxonomy ==
The species was first described in 1994 as Emydura lavarackorum after fossil material was found in Riversleigh in northwest Queensland. It was later demonstrated anatomically that because of its anterior bridge struts that it actually belonged to the genus Elseya and further to a living, although undescribed form. The species was also declared at this time to be Australia's first living fossil freshwater turtle and an extant population of a Pleistocene taxon. The latter gained significant public attention to this species after a story was published in Discover Magazine in January 1997. After placing this species in the correct genus, it was possible to look at the deeper phylogeny of the Elseya. This species lends its name to the group within the Elseya known as the Queensland Elseya or Elseya lavarackorum group. This is a unique group of species that includes Elseya lavarackorum along with Elseya albagula and Elseya irwini, and all three are divergent from the Elseya dentata group.

In recent papers Joseph-Ouni et al. (2020) attempted to deem this species as a fully extinct species and describe the living population as a new species Elseya oneiros. There is only 27 thousand years between the fossil and the living taxon. As such Joseph-Ouni et al. had to deem the fossil as a member of the true Elseya rather than Pelocomastes hence demonstrating a paraphyletic relationship. The evidence they presented for this was minimal and often unscientific, it was published in a journal that has inadequate scientific review. This situation was refuted by Thomson et al. 2023. This most recent paper presented phylogenetic evidence along with detailed descriptions of over 100 characters to refute the claims by Joseph-Ouni et al. a position accepted by the major turtle and reptile checklists.

=== Synonymy ===
- Emydura lavarackorum White & Archer, 1994
  - Elseya lavarackorum — Thomson, White & Georges, 1997
  - Elseya lavarakorum Cann, 1998 (ex errore)
  - Elseya lavackorum Georges & Thomson, 2006 (ex errore)
  - Elseya dentata lavarackorum — Artner, 2008
  - Elseya (Pelocomastes) lavarackorum — Thomson et al., 2015 (comb. nov.)
  - Elseya (Pelocomastes) oneiros Joseph-Ouni et al., 2020

== Description ==
The Gulf snapping turtle is a large, brown to dark brown, short-necked turtle. Its carapace, or upper shell, reaches 35 centimetres (14 in) in straight carapace length; it has an undulating suture between the humeral and pectoral shields in the white plastron, or under shell. The undulating (rather than straight) suture in the plastron distinguishes it from the northern snapping turtle (Elseya dentata).

== Geographic range and habitat ==
The Gulf snapping turtle is restricted to rivers draining into the Gulf of Carpentaria in the Northern Territory and Queensland. These rivers range from the Nicholson to Calvert River systems in the Northern Territory to the Gregory River in Queensland.

== Behaviour ==
The Gulf snapping turtle is primarily herbivorous and eat fruits, flowers, leaves, bark and Pandanus roots, and the juveniles also eat insect larvae. Figs are also an important food for the turtle. Despite its usually herbivorous diet, Lavaracks' turtle is readily trapped using meat as bait.

== Reproduction ==
The eggs of E. lavarackorum are laid in soil near the edge of the water.

== Status and conservation ==
The Gulf snapping turtle is listed as Endangered under the Commonwealth Endangered Species Protection Act 1992, as Vulnerable under Queensland's Nature Conservation Act 1992, and as of Least Concern under the Northern Territory's Territory Parks and Wildlife Conservation Act 2000.

The main threats to the turtle include disturbance to nesting sites by feral animals such as pigs, habitat destruction by grazing and watering cattle, and potentially through changes to hydrology, disturbance, and climate change. In addition to these main threats, Lavaracks' turtle has been known to get caught in fishing nets.
