= Merauke snapping turtle =

Scientific classification
- Kingdom: Animalia
- Phylum: Chordata
- Order: Testudines
- Suborder: Pleurodira
- Family: Chelidae
- Genus: Elseya
- Species: E. papua

Binomial name
- Elseya papua Joseph-Ouni & McCord, 2022

Species of turtle

The Merauke snapping turtle (Elseya papua) is a species of recently described chelid turtle native to the Merauke River basin of the South Papua Province in Indonesia.

== Description ==
The holotype, an adult female, was collected in 1994 near Muting, Indonesia and the species was formally described by Mehdi Joseph-Ouni and William P. McCord in 2022. Adult specimens exhibit many neotenous traits not found in other Elseya species including an almost completely circular carapace, a relatively distinct peaked vertebral keel as well as strongly flared rear marginals. Its closest relatives are potentially the Branderhorst's snapping turtle and the Southern New Guinea stream turtle, with whom the Merauke snapping turtle share their habitat with.
