= Nabire snapping turtle =

Scientific classification
- Kingdom: Animalia
- Phylum: Chordata
- Order: Testudines
- Suborder: Pleurodira
- Family: Chelidae
- Genus: Elseya
- Species: E. nabire

Binomial name
- Elseya nabire Joseph-Ouni & McCord, 2022

Species of turtle

The Nabire snapping turtle (Elseya nabire) is a species of chelid turtle native to the Nabire Regency of the Central Papua Province in Indonesia. The holotype was collected from the Wanggar River in 2008 and the species was formally described to science in 2022. It exhibits unique morphological traits as well as a distinct colouration which distinguish it from other members of its genus. The closest relatives of the Nabire snapping turtle are the Western New Guinea stream turtle and the Northern New Guinea stream turtle.
