= Yolarnie Amepou =

Papuan herpetologist

- Born: 1988 (age 37–38); Madang, Madang Province, Papua New Guinea
- Education: University of Papua New Guinea
- Occupations: Herpetologist; conservationist
- Known for: Director of the Piku Biodiversity Network

Yolarnie Amepou (born 1988) is a zoologist and conservationist from Papua New Guinea. She is known for her work to protect the Papuan softshell turtle (Carettochelys insculpta) in Kikori. In 2017 she was a Youth Champion for the Sustainable Development Goals of the United Nations. She was also received a Pride of Papua New Guinea Award for Environment in 2015.

== Seience Biography ==
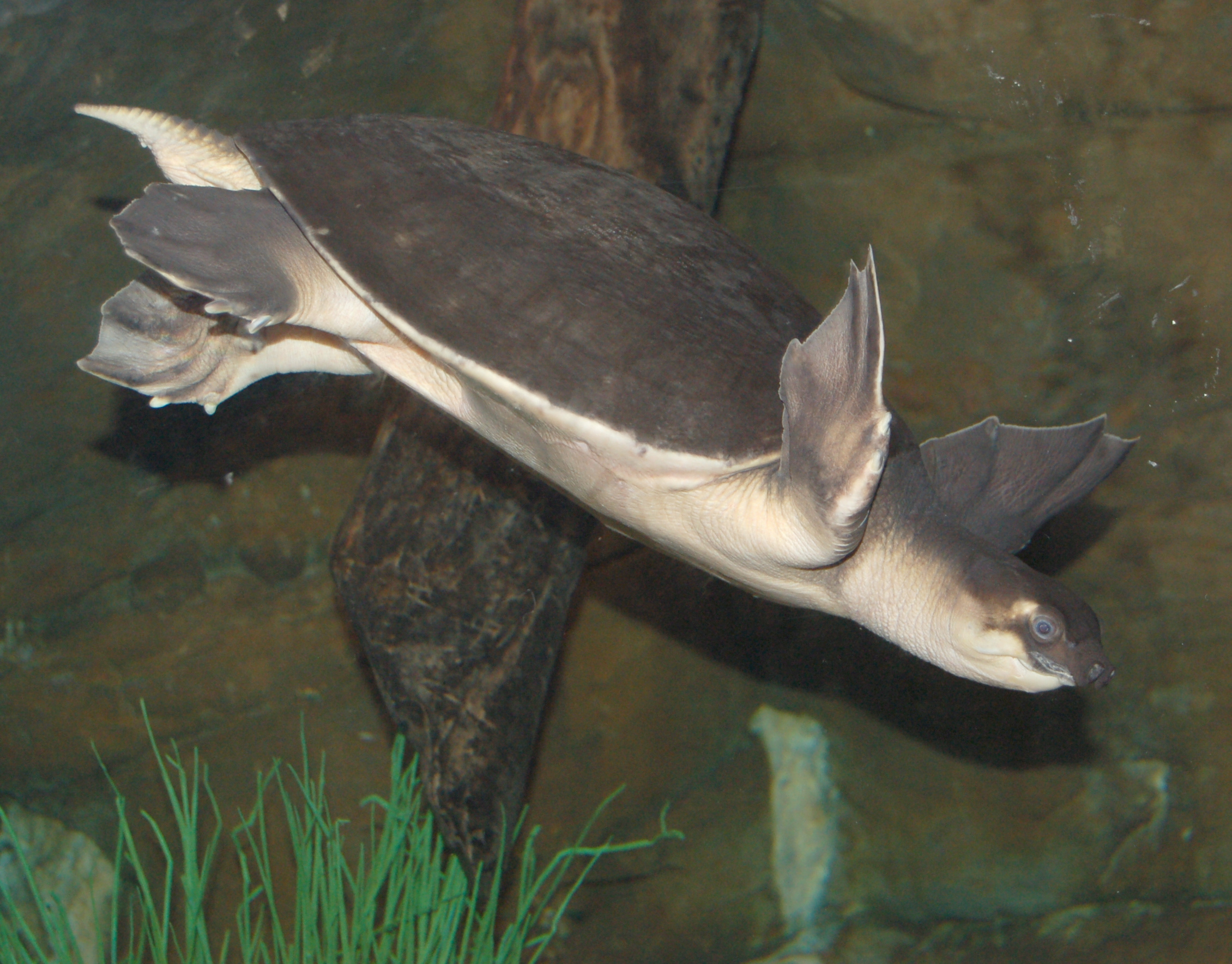
A diving Papuan softshell turtle, which features on PNG's five toea coin.

Amepou was born in Madang in 1988 and attended Holy Spirit Primary School, then Tushab Secondary School. She studied at the University of Papua New Guinea and graduated in 2011 with a Bachelor of Science with a focus on marine biology. After graduation from her BSc, during her honours year of study, she volunteered for the "Piku" project, a Canberra University research and conservation program to protect the endangered Papuan softshell turtle - Carettochelys insculpta. The project was funded by ExxonMobil, which then funded her incomplete Master's degree at the Institute for Applied Ecology at the University of Canberra. In 2019 she was appointed Director of the Piku Biodiversity Network Inc., which emerged from the previous conservation programme. Human harvesting of the turtles is the major threat they face in Papua New Guinea, and Amepou's work encourages communities to self-impose no-harvest zones and to monitor turtle numbers to try to build sustainable populations.

In addition to her work on the project, she works and researches as a herpetologist. In 2015, alongside a team of Australian scientists, she described the new species Elseya rhodini and the subgenus Hanwarachelys within the genus Elseya as part of a revision of the species complex around the New Guinea snapping turtle Elseya novaeguineae. The research team worked on the entire species complex and, in addition to the newly described species, also raised Elseya schultzei, previously regarded as a synonym, to species status again. In 2017 she was part of the team that established the Endangered status of the Papuan Softshell Turtle status for the International Union for Conservation of Nature (IUCN). In June 2019, she co-authored an article appeared on the status of the chytrid fungus (Batrachochytrium dendrobatidis), which is pathogenic in numerous amphibians.

== Awards ==
- Pride of PNG Women’s Award (Environment) - 2015
- Youth Champion for Sustainable Development Goals of the United Nations - 2017

== Publications ==
- C. Eisemberg, M. Rose, B. Yaru, Y. Amepou, A. Georges: Salinity of the coastal nesting environment and its association with body size in the estuarine pig-nosed turtle. Journal of Zoology, London 295, 2015; S. 65–74.
- Scott Thomson, Yolarnie Amepou, Jim Anamiato, Arthur Georges: A new species and subgenus of Elseya (Testudines: Pleurodira: Chelidae) from New Guinea. Zootaxa 4006 (1), 21. August 2015.
- C. Eisemberg, Y. Amepou, M. Rose, B. Yaru, A. Georges: Defining priority areas through social and biological data for the pig-nosed turtle (Carettochelys insculpta) conservation program in the Kikori Region, Papua New Guinea. Journal for Nature Conservation 28, 2015; S. 19–25.
- Y. Amepou: The Piku Project: Saving Papua New Guinea's endangered pig nosed turtle. The Tortoise 5, 2016; S. 52–19.
- D. Bower, S. Clulow, Y. Amepou, A. Georges: Diaries of Frog Research Adventures in Wau Creek Research Station, Papua New Guinea. FrogLog 25(2), 2017; S. 17–21.
- Deborah S. Bower, Karen R. Lips, Yolarnie Amepou, Stephen Richards, Chris Dahl, Elizah Nagombi, Miriam Supuma, Lisa Dabek, Ross A. Alford, Lin Schwarzkopf, Mark Ziembicki, Jeffrey N. Noro, Amir Hamidy, Graeme R. Gillespie, Lee Berger, Carla Eisemberg, Yiming Li, Xuan Liu, Charlotte K. Jennings, Burhan Tjaturadi, Andrew Peters, Andrew K. Krockenberger, Dillian Nason, Mirza D. Kusrini, Rebecca J. Webb, Lee F. Skerratt, Chris Banks, Andrew L. Mack, Arthur Georges, Simon Clulow: Island of opportunity: can New Guinea protect amphibians from a globally emerging pathogen? Frontiers in Ecology and the Environment, Juni 2019.
