= Global Species List Working Group =

Global Species List Working Group: Arbeitsgruppe Globale Artenliste (in German); Groupe de travail sur la liste mondiale des espèces (in French); Grupo de Trabalho da Lista Global de Espécies (in Portuguese); Рабочая группа по глобальному списку видов (in Russian); 全球物種名錄工作組 (in Chinese)
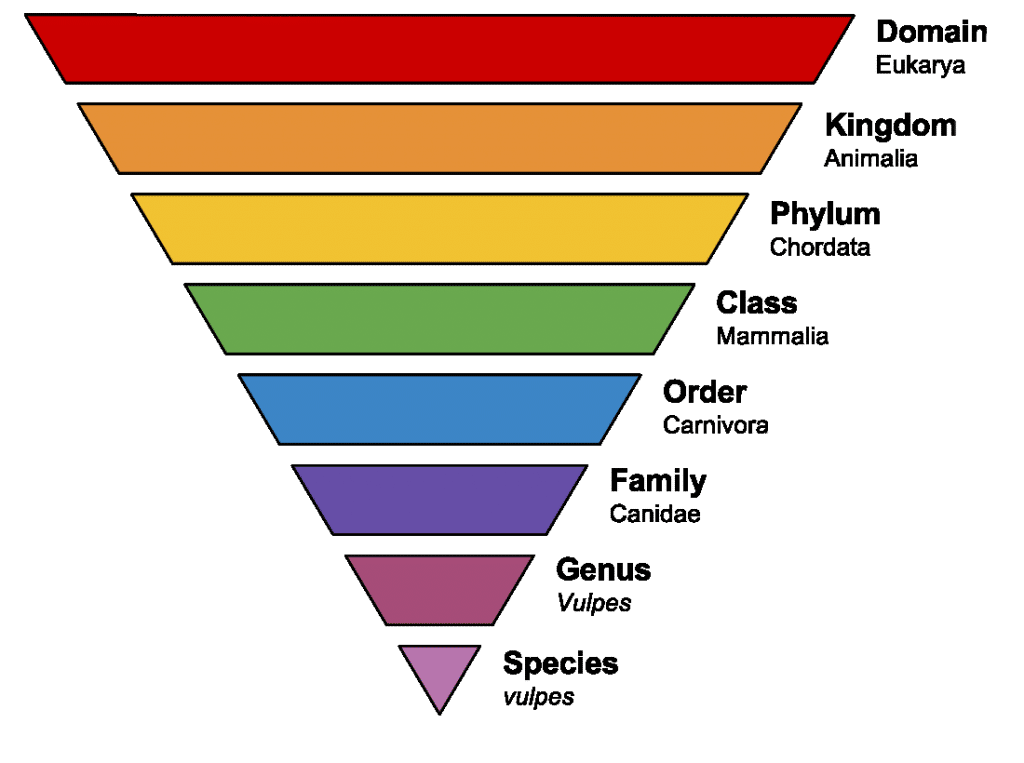
- Formation: 2020; 6 years ago
- Headquarters: Darwin, Australia & Paris, France
- Members: 21 national members
- Coordinator: S. T. Garnett
- Associate Coordinators: Les Christidis, Stijn Conix, Mark Costello, Kevin Thiele, Frank Zachos
- Secretary: S. A. Thomson
- Treasurer: vacant
- Website: www.iubs.org

The Global Species List Working Group (GSLWG) is a non-profit organization and non-governmental organization, founded in 2020, developed under the umbrella of the IUBS with the aim of creating a governance system that imbues global taxon lists with a legitimacy and authority respected by both taxonomists and the users of taxonomy. The organization was developed in response to several publications that demonstrated the need for stability in the names of species. The founding meeting was held in Charles Darwin University in Darwin, Australia in January 2020.

The initial impetus for the group arose from an opinion piece published in the journal Nature by Stephen Garnett and Les Christidis. This piece aroused backlash within the taxonomic community with fears of unnecessary governance being proposed on the science of taxonomy. In a response with 184 authors led by Scott Thomson and Richard Pyle discussion followed. Efforts to reconcile the differences of opinion was made and four authors of these two pieces came to a consensus in the formulation of a new approach to the stabilization of species nomenclature.

== Objectives ==
The primary objective of the GSLWG is to create a governance system that gives global taxon lists a legitimacy and authority respected by both taxonomists and the users of taxonomy. This objective is being pursued through the promotion of 10 principles for creating species lists:

1. . The species list must be based on science and free from nontaxonomic considerations and interference.
2. . Governance of the species list must aim for community support and use.
3. . All decisions about list composition must be transparent.
4. . The governance of validated lists of species is separate from the governance of the naming of species.
5. . Governance of lists of accepted species must not strain academic freedom.
6. . The set of criteria considered sufficient to recognize species boundaries may appropriately vary between different taxonomic groups but should be consistent when possible.
7. . A global list must balance conflicting needs for currency and stability by having archived versions.
8. . Contributors need appropriate recognition.
9. . List content should be traceable.
10. . A global listing process needs both to encompass global diversity and to accommodate local knowledge of that diversity.

The GSLWG is working closely with the Catalogue of Life (COL) as they have already achieved a large aggregation of species within their list after 20 years of experience.

== Publications ==
The developments that led to the formation of this working group came about over a three-year period from 2017 to 2018, these were essentially a debate on the need of some means to stabilise the names being used for species. This was important for purposes of End Users of the science of Taxonomy such as Lawmakers, Conservation Programs, Medicine, Environmental Agencies etc. The principal publications of note here were:

- Stephen T. Garnett; Leslie Christidis (31 May 2017). "Taxonomy anarchy hampers conservation". Nature. 546 (7656): 25–27. doi:10.1038/546025A. ISSN 1476-4687. PMID 28569833.
- Scott Thomson; Richard L Pyle; Shane T Ahyong; et al. (14 March 2018). "Taxonomy based on science is necessary for global conservation". PLOS Biology. 16 (3) e2005075. doi:10.1371/JOURNAL.PBIO.2005075. ISSN 1544-9173. PMC 5851535. PMID 29538381.
- Stephen Thomas Garnett; Les Christidis (14 March 2018). "Science-based taxonomy still needs better governance: Response to Thomson et al". PLOS Biology. 16 (3) e2005249. doi:10.1371/JOURNAL.PBIO.2005249. ISSN 1544-9173. PMC 5851528. PMID 29538369.

Since the formation of the Global Species List Working Group development has been underway to describe and define how the unfinished achievement of Linnaeus can be achieved, that is a complete list of all species. To date the publications are as follows:

- Garnett, ST; Christidis, L; Pyle, RL; Thomson, SA (27 July 2020). "How a scientific spat over how to name species turned into a big plus for nature". The Conversation.
- Stephen T. Garnett; Leslie Christidis; Stijn Conix; et al. (7 July 2020). "Principles for creating a single authoritative list of the world's species". PLOS Biology. 18 (7) e3000736. doi:10.1371/JOURNAL.PBIO.3000736. ISSN 1544-9173. PMC 7340280. PMID 32634138.
- Kevin R. Thiele; Stijn Conix; Richard L. Pyle; et al. (13 July 2021). "Towards a global list of accepted species I. Why taxonomists sometimes disagree, and why this matters". Organisms Diversity and Evolution. 21 (4): 615–622. doi:10.1007/S13127-021-00495-Y. ISSN 1439-6092.
- Scott A. Thomson; Kevin Thiele; Stijn Conix; et al. (14 October 2021). "Towards a global list of accepted species II. Consequences of inadequate taxonomic list governance". Organisms Diversity & Evolution. 21 (4): 623–630. doi:10.1007/s13127-021-00518-8. ISSN 1618-1077.
- Stijn Conix; Stephen T. Garnett; Kevin R. Thiele; et al. (13 July 2021). "Towards a global list of accepted species III. Independence and stakeholder inclusion". Organisms Diversity and Evolution. 21 (4): 631–643. doi:10.1007/S13127-021-00496-X. ISSN 1439-6092.
- Aaron M. Lien; Stijn Conix; Frank E. Zachos; et al. (23 July 2021). "Towards a global list of accepted species IV: Overcoming fragmentation in the governance of taxonomic lists". Organisms Diversity and Evolution. 21 (4): 645–655. doi:10.1007/S13127-021-00499-8. ISSN 1439-6092.
- Richard L. Pyle; Saroj K. Barik; Leslie Christidis; et al. (22 October 2021). "Towards a global list of accepted species V: The devil is in the detail". Organisms Diversity and Evolution. 21 (4): 657–675. doi:10.1007/S13127-021-00504-0. hdl:11343/308051. ISSN 1439-6092.
- Donald Hobern; Saroj K. Barik; Leslie Christidis; et al. (11 October 2021). "Towards a global list of accepted species VI: The Catalogue of Life checklist". Organisms Diversity and Evolution. 21 (4): 677–690. doi:10.1007/s13127-021-00516-w. hdl:11343/308048. ISSN 1439-6092.

The last six publications were released as a special Volume of the journal Organisms Diversity & Evolution.
