= Elseya nadibajagu =

Elseya nadibajagu Temporal range: Early Pliocene

Scientific classification
- Domain: Eukaryota
- Kingdom: Animalia
- Phylum: Chordata
- Class: Reptilia
- Order: Testudines
- Suborder: Pleurodira
- Family: Chelidae
- Genus: Elseya
- Subgenus: Pelocomastes
- Species: E. nadibajagu

Binomial name
- Elseya nadibajagu Thomson & Mackness, 1999

Species of turtle

Elseya nadibajagu is a Pliocene species of extinct Australian snapping turtle, described from the Bluff Downs region of Queensland, Australia.
