= Elseya eidolon =

Conservation status
- Not evaluated (IUCN 3.1)

Scientific classification
- Kingdom: Animalia
- Phylum: Chordata
- Class: Reptilia
- Order: Testudines
- Suborder: Pleurodira
- Family: Chelidae
- Genus: Elseya
- Species: E. eidolon

Binomial name
- Elseya eidolon Joseph-Ouni, McCord & Dwyer, 2022

Species of turtle

Elseya eidolon, known commonly as the Malaita snapping turtle,is a species of chelid turtle which belongs to the subgenus Solomonemys of the genus Elseya. The species is endemic to Malaita Island in the Solomon Islands, where the holotype was collected in March 1995 in a wetland southeast of the locality of Malu'u. It is closely related to and was codiscovered with the Guadalcanal snapping turtle.

The existence of the species was known to western science for some time, but it was assumed to be an introduction of the Northern New Guinea snapping turtle.
