= International Ornithologists' Union =

Organization

- Abbreviation: IOU
- Main organ: Committee of Representatives and International Ornithological Congress
- Affiliations: International Union of Biological Sciences
- Website: www.internationalornithology.org
- Formerly called: International Ornithological Committee

The International Ornithologists' Union (IOU) is an international organization for the promotion of ornithology. It links basic and applied research and nurtures education and outreach activities. Specifically, the IOU organizes and funds global congresses on ornithology at regular intervals, sets up and supports commissions and committees on various aspects of avian biology and conservation, and initiates and backs other international ornithological activities with specific aims consistent with its own mission and goal. It discloses the names and professional affiliations of its members on its website to encourage international collaboration and networking. The IOU acts as the Ornithology Section of the IUBS.

== History ==
International scientific congresses were rare until the late nineteenth century. The inaugural International Ornithological Congress met in Vienna in April 1884 to address bird migration, a transborder phenomenon then poorly understood.

Because tracking European migration required international cooperation, two ornithologists designed a multi-nation study program. Backed by royal patronage, the 1884 congress established a vast European data-collection network. However, the initiative collapsed in the 1890s, overwhelmed by unanalysed data. Parallel efforts to organise the discipline were also occurring globally during this period, focusing on institutional frameworks and systematic observations.

The Second Congress in Budapest maintained this migratory focus while expanding into broader avian biology, notably featuring a seminal synthesis of avian classification by an English ornithologist. By 1900, the congresses covered all ornithological research, meeting in Paris, London and Berlin. World War I geopolitics then forced the cancellation of the 1915 Sarajevo meeting.

A European ornithologist revived the institution after the war, leading to the 1926 Copenhagen congress, which established a permanent four-year cycle. Governance was formalised via the *Règlement des Congrès Ornithologiques Internationaux*. Adopted in 1932 and published in 1938, this constitution regulated the International Ornithological Committee.

World War II caused another disruption, cancelling the 1942 congress scheduled across the Atlantic. The community finally reconvened in 1950 for the Tenth Congress in Uppsala.

== International Ornithological Congress ==
Organized by the IOU, the International Ornithological Congress series is the oldest and largest series of international meetings for bird scientists. The series started in 1884 and has been held every four years since 1926, except for two times when the Second World War disrupted the schedule.

=== Meetings ===
- 1884: Vienna, Austria
- 1891: Budapest, Hungary
- 1900: Paris, France
- 1905: London, United Kingdom
- 1910: Berlin, Germany
- 1926: Copenhagen, Denmark
- 1930: Amsterdam, Netherlands
- 1934: Oxford, United Kingdom
- 1938: Rouen, France
- 1950: Uppsala, Sweden
- 1954: Basel, Switzerland
- 1958: Helsinki, Finland
- 1962: Ithaca, New York, United States
- 1966: Oxford, United Kingdom
- 1970: The Hague, Netherlands
- 1974: Canberra, Australia
- 1978: Berlin, Germany
- 1982: Moscow, Soviet Union
- 1986: Ottawa, Canada
- 1990: Christchurch, New Zealand
- 1994: Vienna, Austria
- 1998: Durban, South Africa
- 2002: Beijing, China
- 2006: Hamburg, Germany
- 2010: Campos do Jordão, Brazil
- 2014: Tokyo, Japan
- 2018: Vancouver, Canada
- 2022: Durban, South Africa^{[a]}

== See also ==
- Cornell Lab of Ornithology
- American Ornithological Society
- British Ornithologists' Union
- Birds of the World: Recommended English Names
