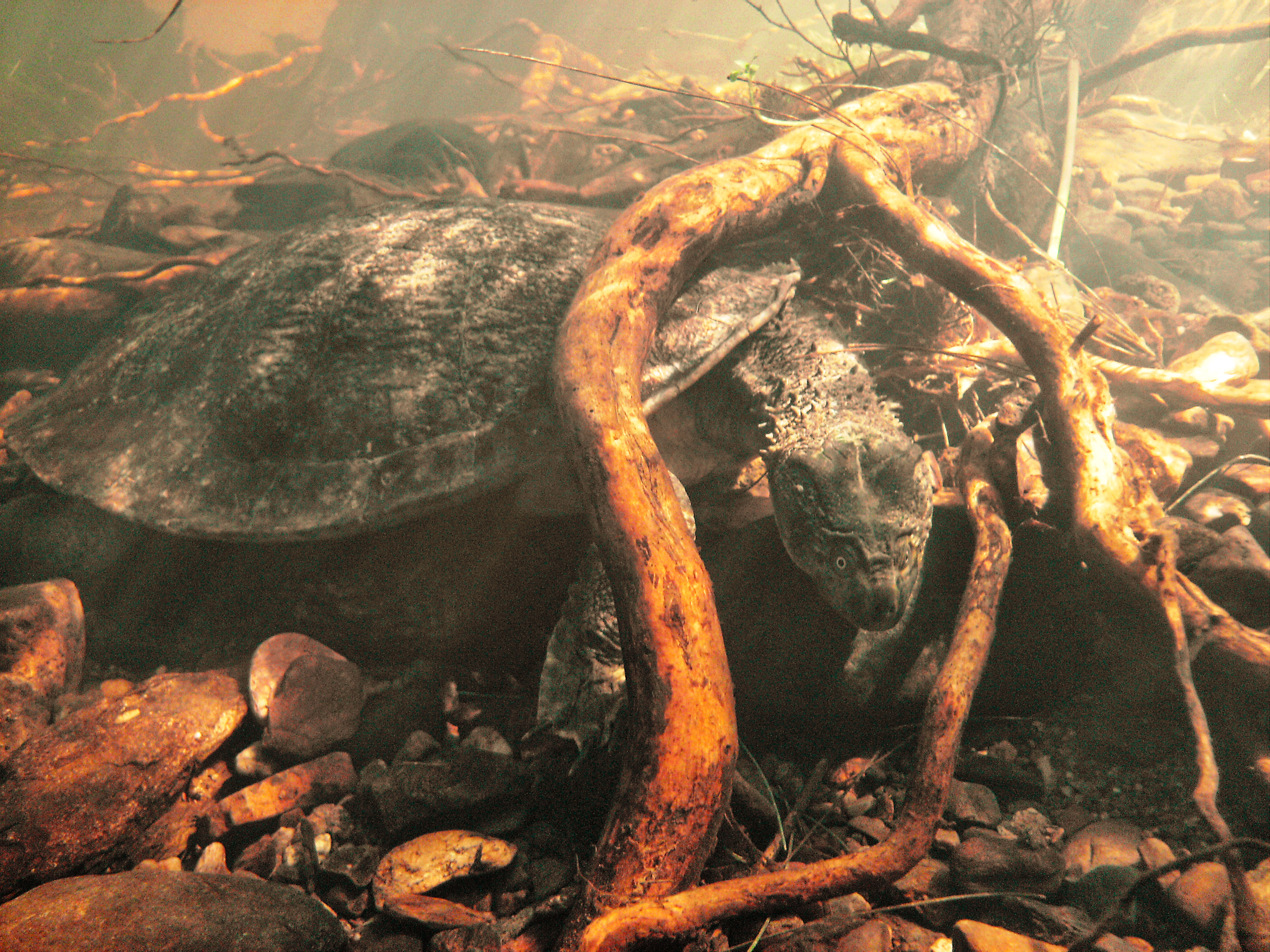

Conservation status
- Vulnerable (IUCN 2.3)

Scientific classification
- Kingdom: Animalia
- Phylum: Chordata
- Class: Reptilia
- Order: Testudines
- Suborder: Pleurodira
- Family: Chelidae
- Genus: Rheodytes
- Species: R. leukops

Binomial name
- Rheodytes leukops Legler & Cann, 1980

Synonyms
- Rheodytes leukops Legler & Cann, 1980; Rheodytes leucops Georges, 1983 (ex errore); Elseya leukops Wells & Wellington, 1984; Rheodytes leukops Fritz & Havas, 2007

= Fitzroy River turtle =

Species of turtle

The Fitzroy River turtle (Rheodytes leukops) is a species of freshwater turtle in the family Chelidae. It is the only surviving member of the genus Rheodytes, the other member being the extinct form Rheodytes devisi. The species is endemic to south-eastern Queensland, Australia and only found in tributaries of the Fitzroy River.

== Description ==
The Fitzroy River turtle is light to dark brown in color and grows to about 260 mm in carapace length. The shells of hatchlings (up to 95 mm long) are highly serrated, while adults have rounded, smooth-edged shells. The plastron is lighter in color and tapers anteriorly and posteriorly. The carapace is highly reticulated to the naked eye, but this resolves as a series of parallel ridges with occasional cross-ridging under low magnification. The plastron is smooth. The scutes are very thin and underlying sutures in both the carapace and plastron are visible through them in all but the darkest individuals. Pictured in the box is a carapace of a subadult Rheodytes leukops (242 mm length) showing the very visible sutures that can be seen through the scutes, still in place. The species can also be identified by its very thin carapace bones, a characteristic also used in diagnosing the related fossil species R. devisi. The upper surfaces of their necks are scattered with blunt to pointed, conical skin tubercles that do not appear to have any specialized follicular centres. The species has a single pair of barbels on the lower jaw. The Fitzroy River turtle is capable of obtaining up to 70% of its oxygen needs from the water through its cloaca, in a process called cloacal respiration. This allows it to remain under water for up to three weeks.

== Biology ==
=== Diet ===
This turtle is an adept bottom feeder, preying on terrestrial and aquatic insects, macroinvertebrates, crustaceans, algae, aquatic snails, worms, freshwater sponges, and aquatic plants such as ribbon weed (Vallisneria sp.). Stomach flushing has demonstrated that most of the diet was made up of macroinvertebrates with some freshwater sponges.

=== Natural history and observations in the wild ===
This species shows a clear preference for fast-flowing water (near sand banks for egg laying) and has been found at depths as shallow as 15 cm. In most encounters, they have been found lying still, hidden by overhanging plant foliage along the shallow banks of fast-flowing riffles (fast-flowing streams or rapids) and under logs. In all encounters, their preferred substratum was noted as coarse river sand and gravel.

=== Breeding biology ===
Sexual dimorphism is limited, with the tail of the female being acutely shorter than that of the male. The most accurate way to differentiate between sexes is to compare the distance between the anal scutes of the plastron and the cloacae. In the male, the cloaca is located further away from the plastron than in the female. Most other short-necked turtles in Australia show obvious differences in tail length and thickness. Multiclutching is demonstrated in this species; corpora lutea, current eggs, and enlarged follicles were present in the females, indicating at least three clutches. Anecdotal records since indicate up to five clutches may occur.

== Conservation status ==
Their habitat comprises a total area of less than 10,000 km^{2}, including the Fitzroy, Mackenzie, and Dawson Rivers. Its limited distribution and status as sole survivor of a once more widespread genus give it a high priority for conservation. The species has been listed as vulnerable on the IUCN checklist since 1994. The Fitzroy River turtle is commonly known as the "bum-breathing turtle", a nickname derived from its unusual ability to absorb oxygen whilst submerged through highly vascularized bursae located in the cloaca by extracting oxygen from the water chiefly via two enlarged cloacal bursae that are lined with multibranching papillae. Therefore, reductions in aquatic oxygen levels, particularly by agriculture and dams, reduces survival among juvenile classes. Three major impacts on the species have been identified - reduction in invertebrate prey, conversion of fluvial to lacustrine habitat, and the increase of sedimentation impacting the cloacal breathing mode. Hence it is listed as vulnerable under both the Environment Protection and Biodiversity Conservation Act (EPBC Act 1999) and the Queensland Nature Conservation Act, 1992. The IUCN currently flags this species as in need of review.
