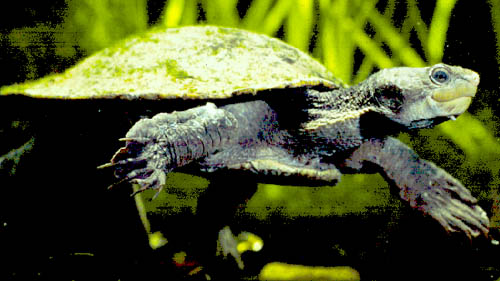
- Elseya lavarackorum

Scientific classification
- Kingdom: Animalia
- Phylum: Chordata
- Class: Reptilia
- Order: Testudines
- Suborder: Pleurodira
- Family: Chelidae
- Subfamily: Chelodininae
- Genus: Elseya; Gray, 1867

Type species
- Chelymys dentata Gray, 1867 (subsequent designation)

Synonyms
- Chelymys Gray, 1844; Euchelymys Gray, 1871; Pelocomastes De Vis, 1897

= Elseya =

Genus of turtles

Elseya is a genus of large side-necked turtles, commonly known as Australian snapping turtles, in the family Chelidae. Species in the genus Elseya are found in river systems in northern and northeastern Australia and throughout the river systems of New Guinea. They are identified by the presence of alveolar ridges on the triturating surfaces of the mouth and the presence of a complex bridge strut.

The Australian snapping turtles are largely herbivorous, with specialized mouth structures for eating fruits. However, they will eat animal products if opportunity arises. The various species can be found in large numbers where they are still abundant, e.g., Northern Territory of Australia. However, a number of the populations have become increasingly rare, and some are now listed as endangered.

== Systematics ==
=== Etymology ===
John Edward Gray created the generic name, Elseya, in 1867 in honour of Dr. Joseph Ravenscroft Elsey, a surgeon-naturalist on the Gregory Expedition that traversed northern Australia from the Victoria River to Moreton Bay in 1855–1856.

=== List of species ===
The genus was originally described by Gray in 1867 with the type species being set as Elseya dentata. The fossil genus Pelocomastes was later synonymised with this genus. Following the recent revisions of this genus, the latisternum group has been moved to the new genus Myuchelys. The remaining species of this genus have additionally been separated into three subgenera, Elseya, Pelocomastes, and Hanwarachelys, and the species redistributed among them.

Common name	Scientific name (Note: A binomial authority in parentheses indicates the species was originally described in a genus other than Pelusios.)	IUCN Red List Status	Picture
Subgenus: Elseya
Northern snapping turtle	Elseya dentata (Gray, 1863)	LC	
Branderhorst's snapping turtle	Elseya branderhorsti (Ouwens, 1914)	VU^{IUCN}	
Yellow-bellied snapping turtle	Elseya flaviventralis Thomson & Georges, 2016	LC	
	Elseya kalumburu Joseph-Ouni, McCord & Cann, 2022		
Subgenus: Pelocomastes
White-throated snapping turtle	Elseya albagula Thomson, Georges & Limpus, 2006	EN	
Irwin's turtle	Elseya irwini Cann, 1997	NE	
Gulf snapping turtle	Elseya lavarackorum (White & Archer, 1994)	NE	
Subgenus: Hanwarachelys
	Elseya caelatus Joseph-Ouni & McCord, 2019		
Merauke snapping turtle	Elseya papua Joseph-Ouni & McCord, 2022		
Western New Guinea stream turtle	Elseya novaeguineae (Meyer, 1874)	LC^{IUCN}	
Nabire snapping turtle	Elseya nabire Joseph-Ouni & McCord, 2022		
Southern New Guinea stream turtle	Elseya rhodini Thomson, Amepou, Anamiato & Georges, 2015		
Northern New Guinea stream turtle	Elseya schultzei (T. Vogt, 1911)	LC	
Subgenus: Solomonemys
Guadalcanal snapping turtle	Elseya auramemoria Joseph-Ouni, McCord & Dwyer, 2022		
Malaita snapping turtle	Elseya eidolon Joseph-Ouni, McCord & Dwyer, 2022		

=== Extinct species ===
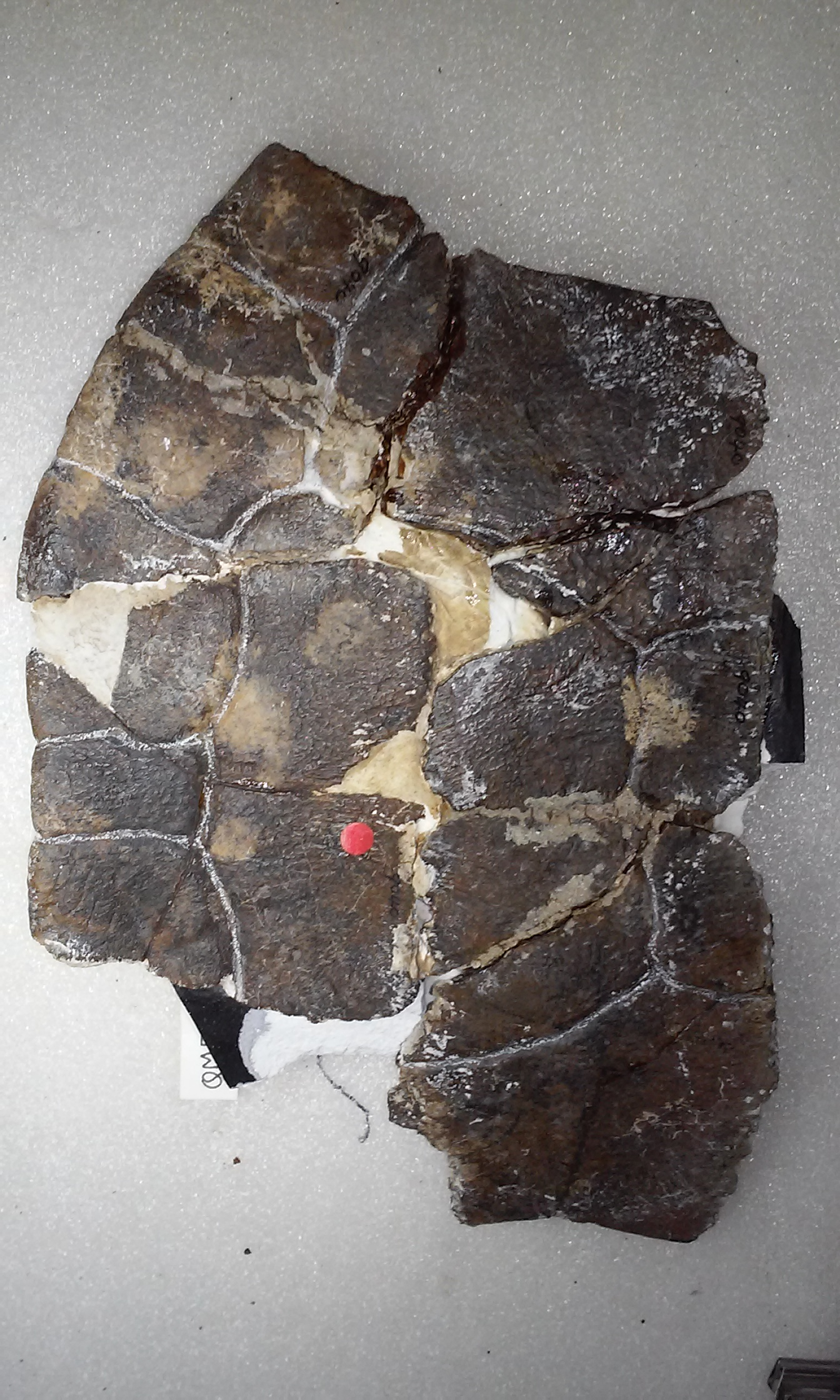
Fossil of Elseya uberrima

There are two identified extinct species of Elseya. Elseya nadibajagu Thomson & Mackness, 1999 and Elseya uberrima (De Vis, 1897) are prehistoric species known only from fossils. E. lavarackorum was initially believed also to be a fossil taxon, but later discovered to be still extant. Elseya nadibajagu is a Pliocene species of extinct Australian snapping turtle, described from the Bluff Downs region of Queensland, Australia.; whereas Elseya uberrima is a Pleistocene species described from the Darling Downs region of Queensland, Australia.

== External links and further reading ==
- Gondwanan Turtle Site
