= Elseya caelatus =

Scientific classification
- Kingdom: Animalia
- Phylum: Chordata
- Class: Reptilia
- Order: Testudines
- Suborder: Pleurodira
- Family: Chelidae
- Genus: Elseya
- Subgenus: Hanwarachelys
- Species: E. caelatus

Binomial name
- Elseya caelatus Joseph-Ouni & McCord, 2019

Species of New Guinea turtle

Elseya caelatus is a species of Australasian snapping turtle that is endemic to New Guinea. The specific epithet caelatus (“carved”) refers to the strongly sculpted texture of the carapace.

== Subspecies ==
- E. c. caelatus Joseph-Ouni & McCord, 2019
- E. c. ayamaru Joseph-Ouni & McCord, 2019

== Distribution ==
The species occurs in Western New Guinea, including the Bird's Head Peninsula as well as the nearby islands of Salawati and Waigeo. The type locality for the nominate subspecies is Salawati; that for E. c. ayamaru is the Ayamaru Lakes.
