= Elseya kalumburu =

Scientific classification
- Kingdom: Animalia
- Phylum: Chordata
- Class: Reptilia
- Order: Testudines
- Suborder: Pleurodira
- Family: Chelidae
- Genus: Elseya
- Subgenus: Elseya
- Species: E. kalumburu

Binomial name
- Elseya kalumburu Joseph-Ouni, McCord, & Cann, 2022

Species of turtle

Elseya kalumburu is a species of large river snapping turtles from Australia. It is a member of the nominate subgenus Elseya.
