= Birds of the Gods =

Birds of the Gods is a PBS Nature documentary on the bird of paradise in Papua New Guinea. It features the field research of conservationists Paul Igag and Miriam Supuma, who document the mating behaviors of different species of birds of paradise, and the ceremonial use of the birds' plumage by the tribes of New Guinea. Igag died shortly after release and is honored with a brief in memoriam at the end of the program.

It is narrated by Sir David Attenborough.
