= Elseya auramemoria =

Scientific classification
- Kingdom: Animalia
- Phylum: Chordata
- Order: Testudines
- Suborder: Pleurodira
- Family: Chelidae
- Genus: Elseya
- Species: E. auramemoria

Binomial name
- Elseya auramemoria Joseph-Ouni, McCord & Dwyer, 2022

Species of turtle

Elseya auramemoria, known commonly as the Guadalcanal snapping turtle, is a species of chelid turtle which belongs to the subgenus Solomonemys of the genus Elseya. The species is endemic to Guadalcanal Island in the Solomon Islands. There had never been a formal report of the Guadalcanal snapping turtle made before its discovery. It is closely related to and was codiscovered with the Malaita snapping turtle.

The holotype was collected in May 1995 from the middle-lower reaches of the eastern bank of the Mbonehe River located in the north of Guadalcanal Island in the Solomon Islands.
