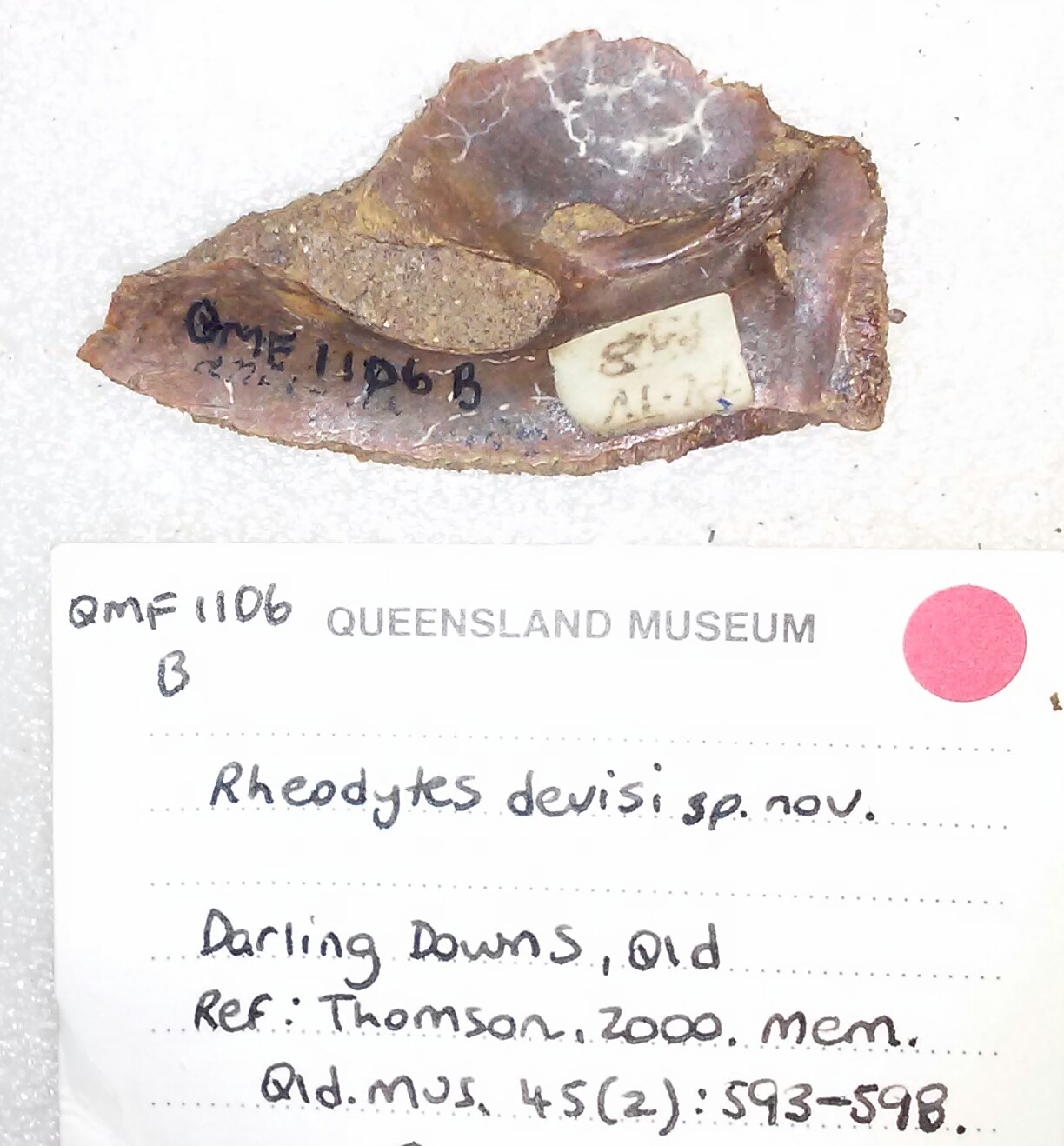

Scientific classification
- Domain: Eukaryota
- Kingdom: Animalia
- Phylum: Chordata
- Class: Reptilia
- Order: Testudines
- Suborder: Pleurodira
- Family: Chelidae
- Genus: Rheodytes
- Species: R. devisi

Binomial name
- Rheodytes devisi Thomson 2000

= Rheodytes devisi =

Rheodytes devisi Temporal range: Pliocene–Pleistocene

Extinct species of turtle

Rheodytes devisi is a Pleistocene fossil turtle from the Darling Downs of Queensland, Australia. It was described from material originally included in the description of Elseya uberima.
