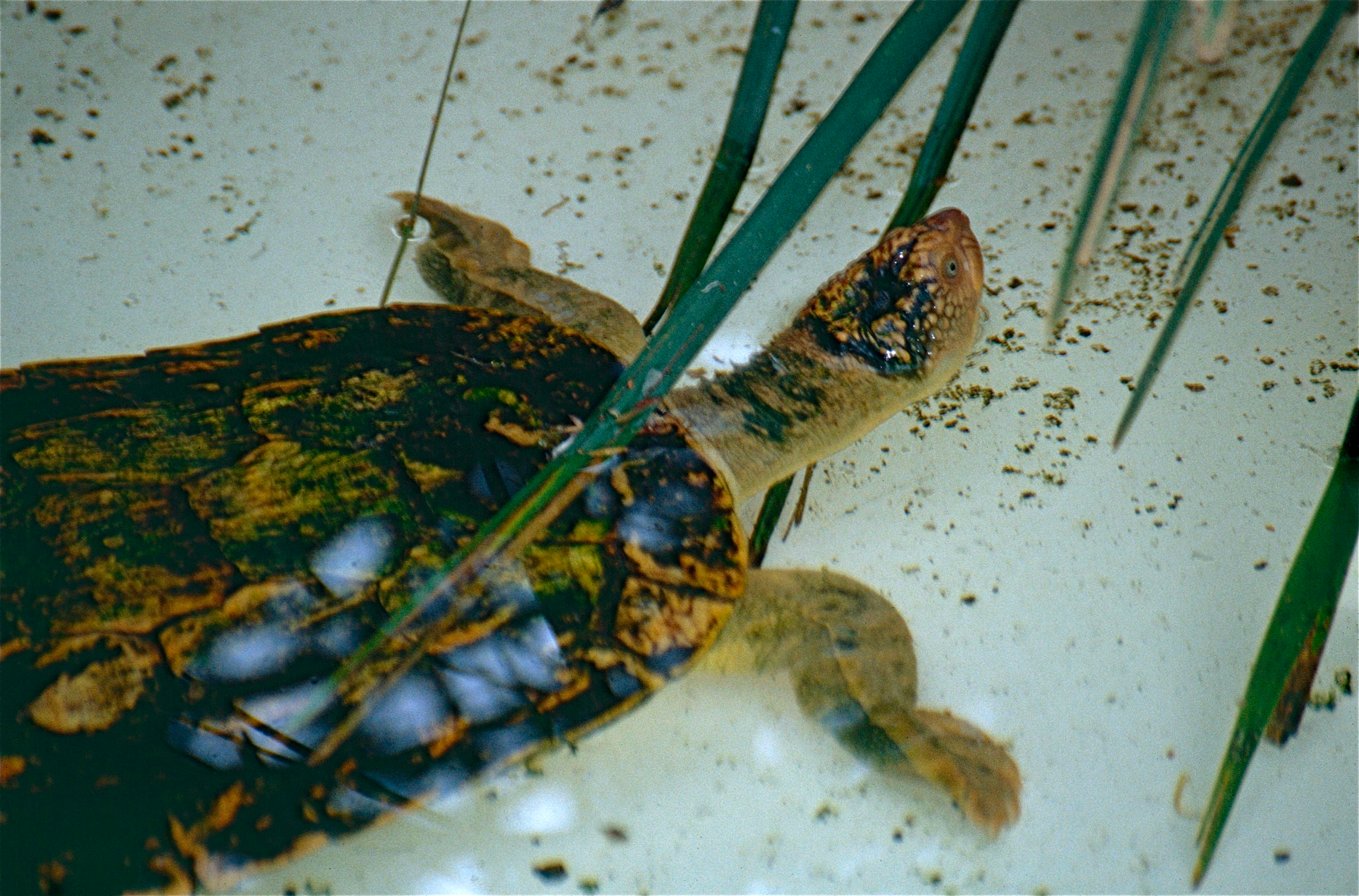
- Rheodytes leukops

Scientific classification
- Domain: Eukaryota
- Kingdom: Animalia
- Phylum: Chordata
- Class: Reptilia
- Order: Testudines
- Suborder: Pleurodira
- Family: Chelidae
- Subfamily: Chelodininae
- Genus: Rheodytes; Legler and Cann, 1980

Species
- Rheodytes leukops † Rheodytes devisi

= Rheodytes =

Genus of turtles

Rheodytes is a genus of turtle in the Chelidae family from Australia. It contains the following species:

- Fitzroy River turtle (Rheodytes leukops)
- † Rheodytes devisi (Pleistocene)
