= Miriam Supuma =

Papua New Guinean conservationist

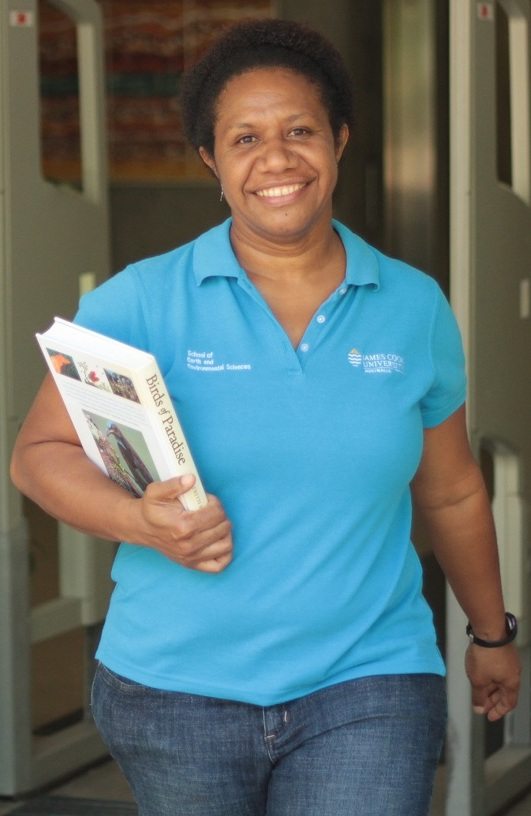

Miriam Supuma is a conservationist in Papua New Guinea (PNG). She was the co-founder and co-director of the PNG Institute of Biological Research (PNGIBR), a scientific research NGO. Her field research has centred around Birds of Paradise, particularly in relation to the use of their feathers for traditional adornment by people in the highlands of PNG.

== Early life ==
Supuma's father worked for the police department and was posted to several different rural locations, accompanied by his family. She was particularly influenced by their time in the Western Province of PNG, close to the town of Merauke in the Indonesia province of Papua. This is a region of considerable bird diversity that receives many migratory species. She was given freedom to roam around and explore the forests and freshwater streams.

Supuma went to the University of Papua New Guinea (UPNG) to study for a degree in biology, majoring in ecology. During her final year, she was selected to participate in a one-month training course being run by the Wildlife Conservation Society in PNG. This gave her the opportunity to fly to remote areas and created in her an awareness of peoples' dependence on their environment. The experience led to her deciding that she wanted to work in the field of conservation. Her research that led to her first-class honours degree at UPNG was carried out on forest dynamics in Crater Mountain Wildlife Management Area, in the PNG highlands. She later studied between 2004 and 2005 for a master's degree in tropical rainforest ecology at James Cook University in North Queensland, Australia, an area with considerable tropical rainforest.

== Career ==
After obtaining the master's degree, Supuma worked for the Wildlife Conservation Society (WCSPNG) as a conservationist. She later became co-director of WCSPNG, working in its Goroka office in the Eastern Highlands Province. In 2008, together with Banak Gamui, she founded the PNG Institute of Biological Research (PNGIBR), a not-for-profit association formed to ensure a biologically sustainable future for PNG, that conducted research and trained PNG biologists and conservationists, while aiming to ensure that information was shared with policy makers, landowners and PNG citizens. One of the activities she carried out with the PNGIBR was to survey the use of Bird of Paradise feathers and other adornments at the annual Goroka Show, which is attended by about 100 tribes wearing traditional costumes.

Supuma collaborated with the BBC to make a film on Birds of Paradise, which was first broadcast in 2009 in the BBC's Natural World series, being introduced and narrated by David Attenborough. It was also broadcast by PBS in the USA as Birds of the Gods. The programme follows her, and Paul Igag, an ornithologist, as they search for the birds in the rainforest.

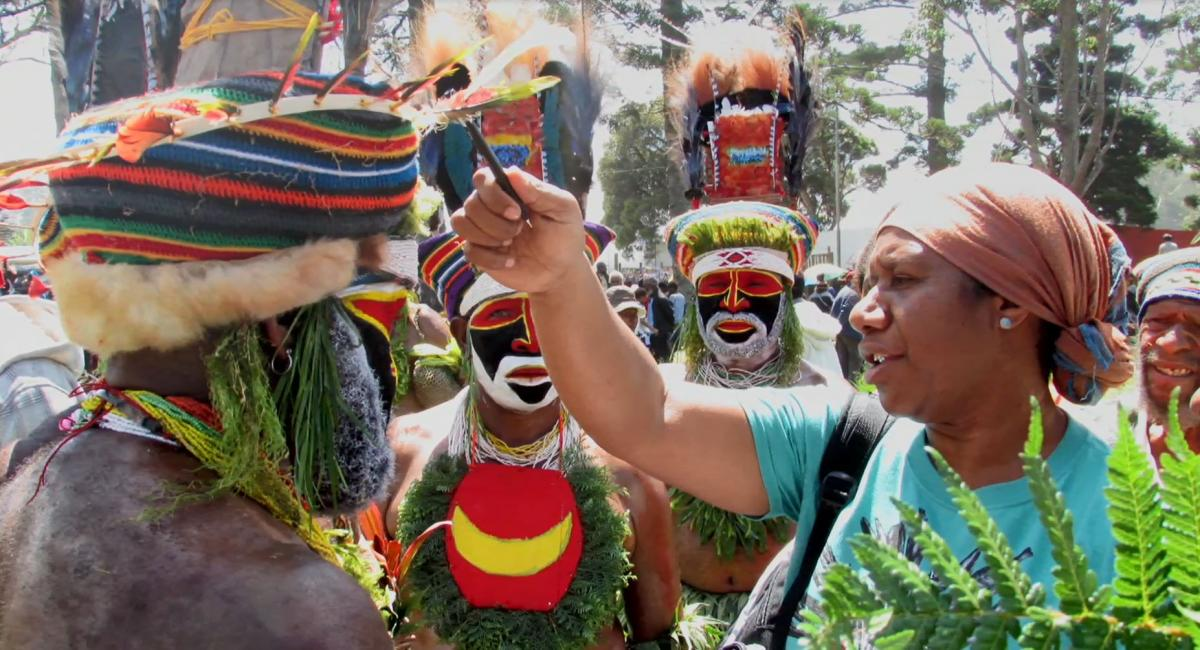
Supuma as a PhD researcher

In 2013 Supuma left PNGIBR to study for a PhD in natural resource management, again at James Cook University. She received an Australian Leadership Award scholarship, as well as an Allison Sudrajat Award, given to only two people from PNG in any one year. Her research concentrated on conservation risks to endemic bird species associated with subsistence use and climate change. Her intention was to influence national policy in the areas of natural management, land use, and conservation planning to enable better protection of PNG's flora and fauna, as well as the country's cultural diversity and heritage. Her thesis was entitled Endemic birds in Papua New Guinea's montane forests: human use and conservation.

After obtaining her PhD, Supuma worked briefly with the Port Moresby Nature Park before joining The Christensen Fund, an organization that assists indigenous communities. She was responsible for supporting local groups in Melanesia to apply for grants and carry out the necessary monitoring and implementation. In 2021 she joined the Flourishing Diversity Programme of the NGO, Synchronicity Earth, based in PNG.
