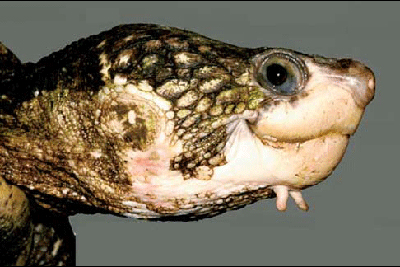
- Closeup of head, showing white throat

Conservation status
- Endangered (IUCN 2.3)

Scientific classification
- Kingdom: Animalia
- Phylum: Chordata
- Class: Reptilia
- Order: Testudines
- Suborder: Pleurodira
- Family: Chelidae
- Genus: Elseya
- Subgenus: Pelocomastes
- Species: E. albagula

Binomial name
- Elseya albagula Thomson, Georges & Limpus, 2006

Synonyms
- Elseya albagula Thomson, Georges & Limpus, 2006; Elseya dentata albagula — Artner, 2008; Elseya albagula — Georges & Thomson, 2010

= Elseya albagula =

Species of turtle

Elseya albagula, commonly known as the white-throated snapping turtle, is one of the largest species of chelid turtles in the world, growing to about 45 cm (18 in) carapace length.

The species is endemic to south-eastern Queensland, Australia, in the Burnett, Mary, and Fitzroy River drainages. This species is entirely aquatic, rarely coming ashore and is chiefly herbivorous, feeding on the fruits and buds of riparian vegetation, algae, and large aquatic plants.

First proposed as a species by John Goode in the 1960s, it was finally described in 2006. The species is named from the Latin alba = white and gula = throat, which is a reference to the white blotching present on the throats of adult females in the species.

The type locality for the species is the Burnett River in south-eastern Queensland, but it is also found in the Mary and Fitzroy River drainages to the north of the Burnett. Some have argued for each of these rivers to represent different species, but DNA, morphological, and morphometric analyses does not support this conclusion.

== Etymology ==
The specific name, albagula, is derived from the Latin adjective alba meaning white and the noun gula for throat, both of which are feminine. Hence, the name means "white-throated" and refers to the white or cream throat commonly seen in adult females of this species.

== Description ==
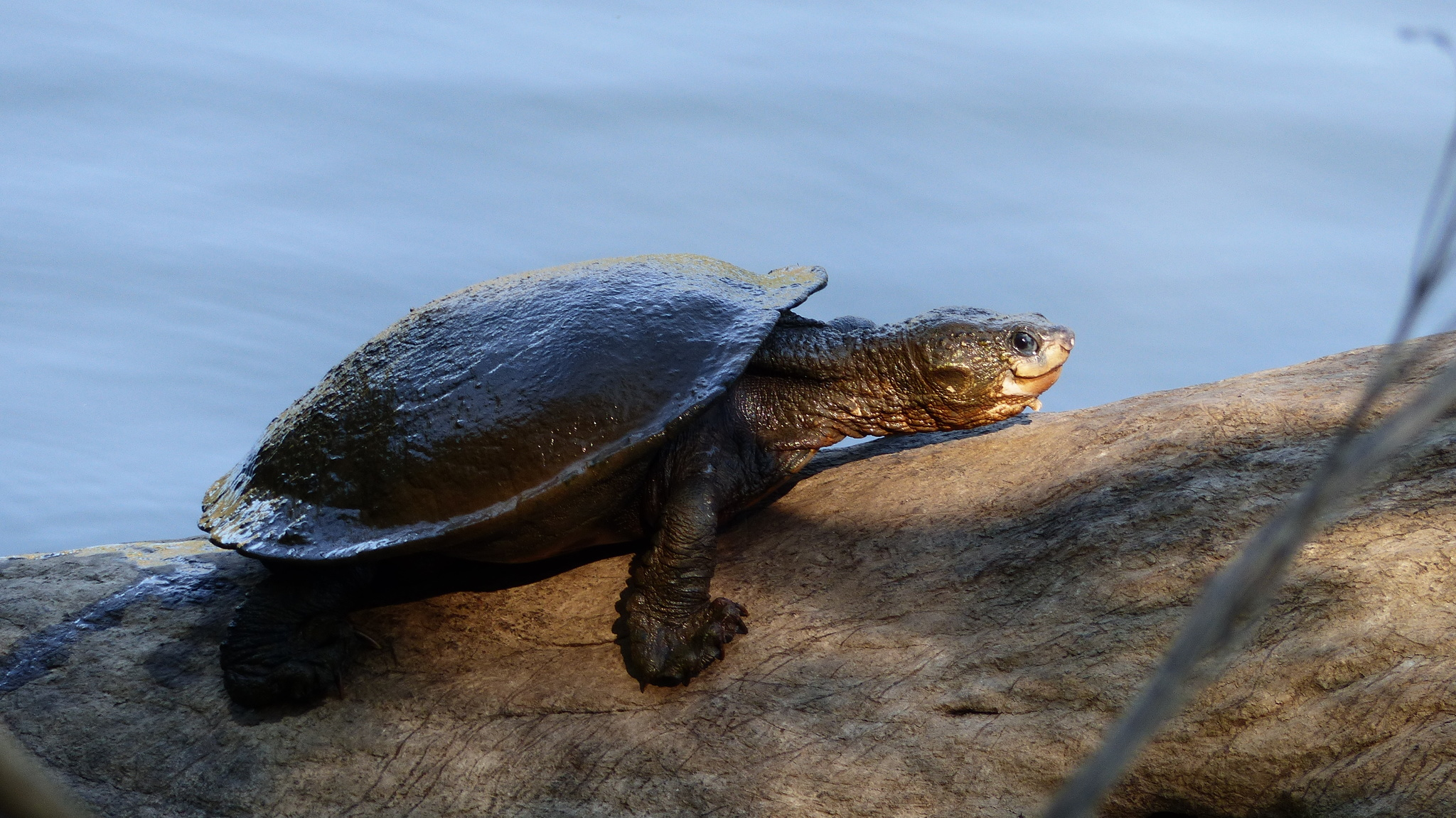
In Queensland

The carapace of this species is broadly oval, but is blunt at the front. In younger animals, it has keeled scutes along the back. The carapace is dark brown to black in color, smooth with no growth annuli and generally lackluster. The plastron is heavily stained in adults, appearing black over the true base color of yellow to cream. The plastron is narrow compared to the carapace.

The head is large and robust with a complete head shield that does not approach the ears. The tomial sheath is large, and inside an alveolar ridge is distinct and well formed. The head is typically dark brown to grey above and, in females, is usually blotched with cream to white in the throat region.

== Biology ==
White-throated snapping turtles are amongst a handful of other turtle and fish species in that they can undertake cloacal respiration, absorbing oxygen from the surrounding environment through their cloaca whilst submerged.

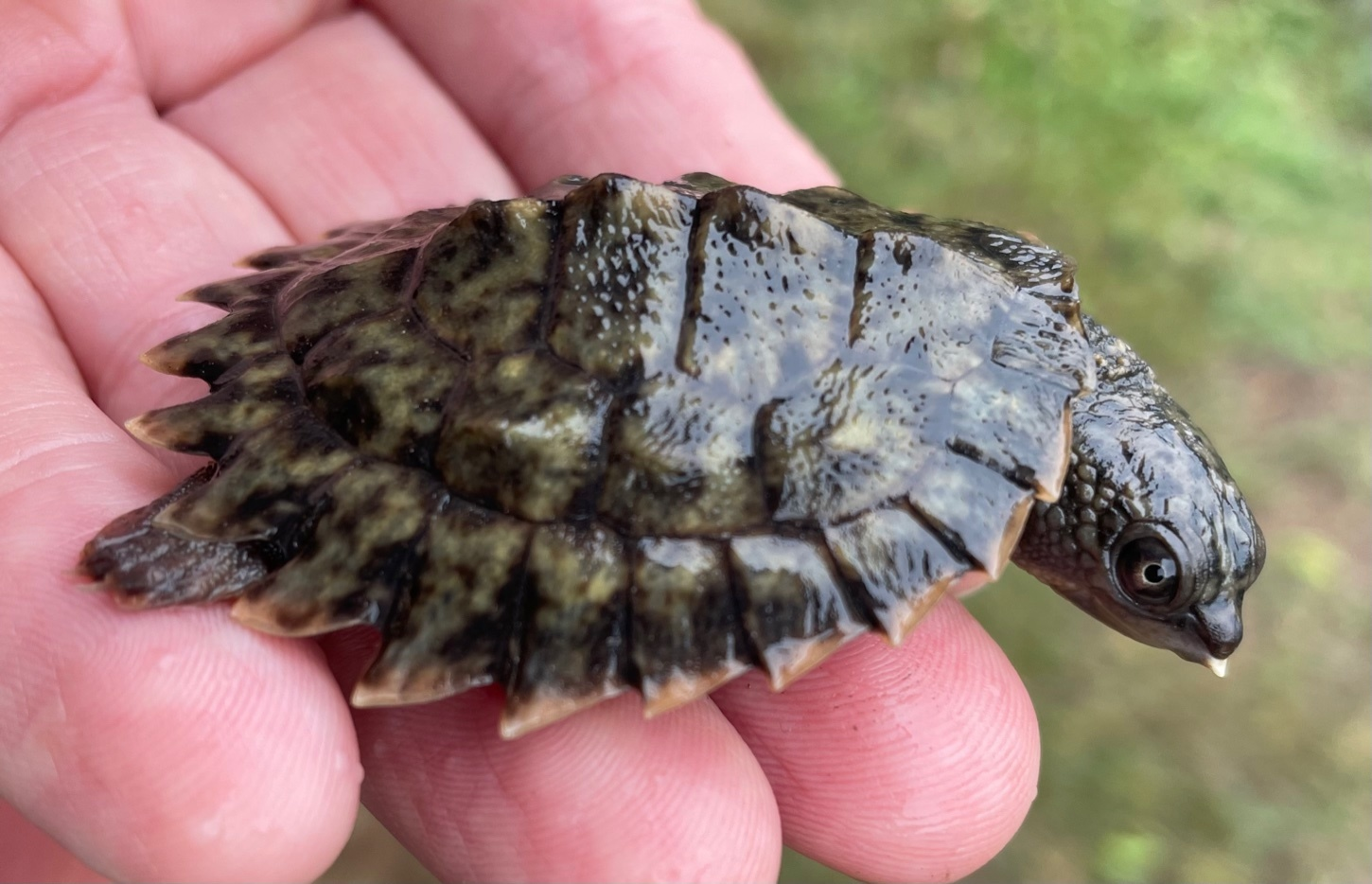
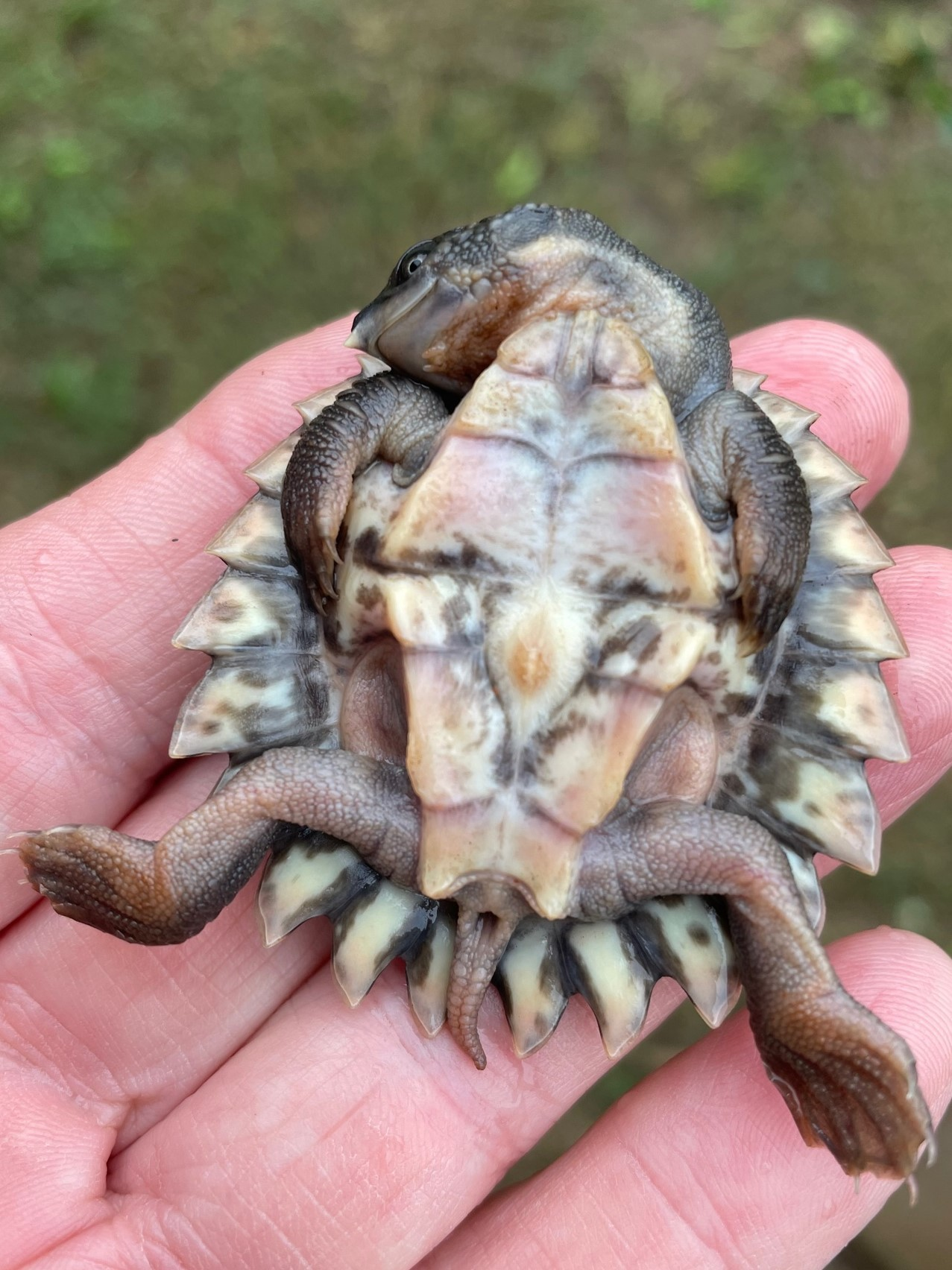
Juvenile

== Conservation ==
Three major factors affect the survival of this species. The first is nest predation and nest destruction, particularly by introduced species such as foxes that dig up the nests and cattle which trample them. The second is the damming of the rivers in which they occur, with all but one of the rivers in which the species is found now dammed to some degree. This changes the temperatures within the river, affecting reproduction. It also affects the remodeling of sand banks during flood events, eventually leading to unusable nesting sites. The populations are aging, meaning that larger numbers of adults have little recruitment. The last factor is the damage to individuals as they get washed over dam walls to their deaths.

As well, an application by coal seam gas company Santos to dump untreated wastewater in the Dawson River threatens a population of white-throated snapping turtles according to the Independent Expert Scientific Committee on Coal Seam Gas and Large Coal Mining Development.

A number of actions have been proposed. A head start program is being supported by the Queensland government where eggs are incubated at a hatchery with the young then released and monitored. Also active nest site protection prevents predation and trampling of existing nests. "Turtleways" have been proposed in the dams to allow turtles to get by these structures without being killed by the fall over the dam wall.
