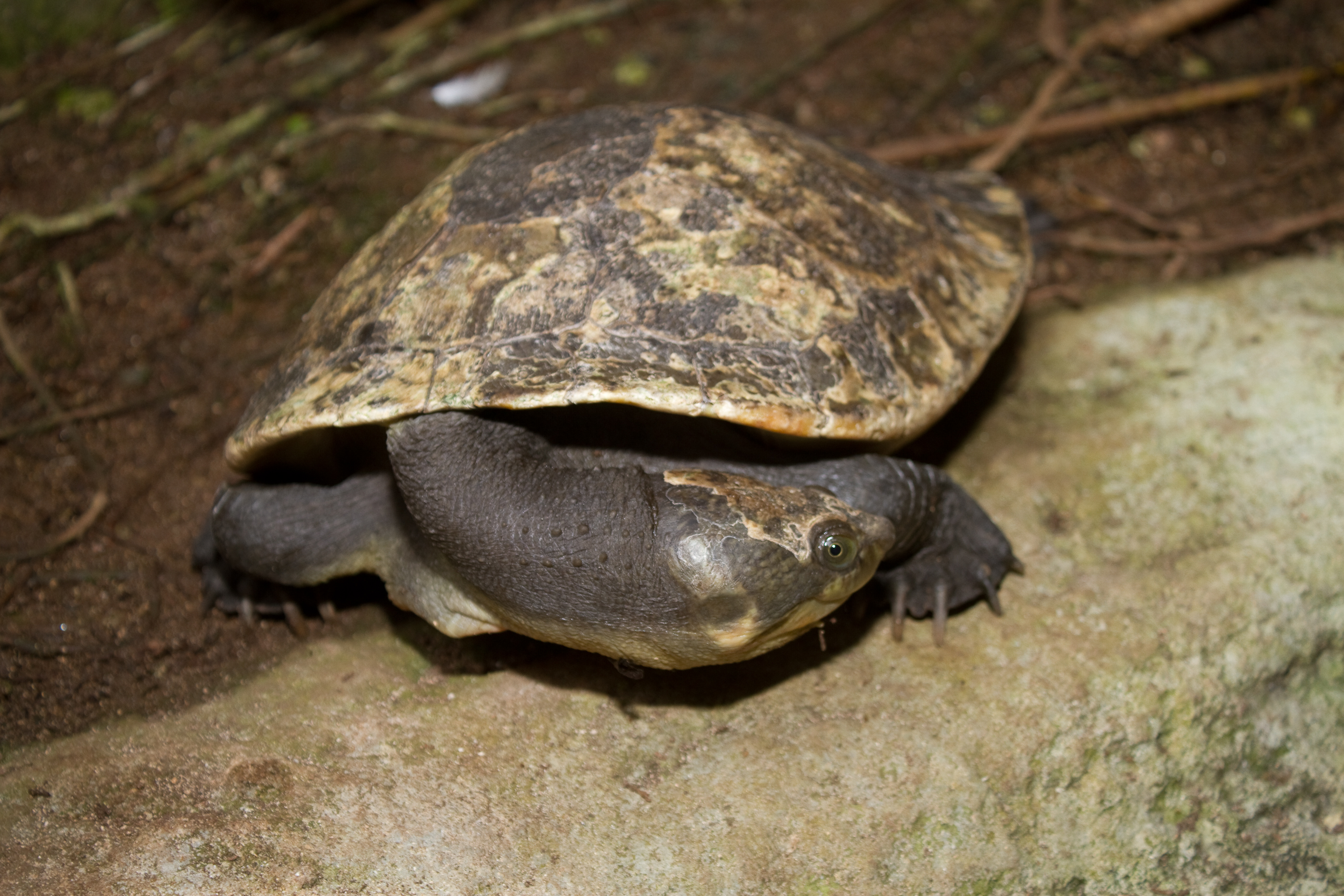

Conservation status
- Least Concern (IUCN 2.3)

Scientific classification
- Domain: Eukaryota
- Kingdom: Animalia
- Phylum: Chordata
- Class: Reptilia
- Order: Testudines
- Suborder: Pleurodira
- Family: Chelidae
- Genus: Elseya
- Subgenus: Hanwarachelys
- Species: E. novaeguineae

Binomial name
- Elseya novaeguineae (Meyer, 1874:128)

Synonyms
- See text

= New Guinea snapping turtle =

Species of turtle

The Western New Guinea stream turtle or New Guinea snapping turtle (Elseya novaeguineae) is a species of freshwater turtle in the Chelidae family. It is found in the Bird's Head Peninsula and the Bomberai Peninsula west of Cenderawasih Bay, and on the island of Waigeo of West Papua, Indonesia.

== Taxonomy ==
This species was recently moved from Elseya to Myuchelys by Georges and Thomson (2010); however, this was later deemed in error by the authors and was argued against by Rhodin et al., (2010) with the support of the authors. Hence it has been returned to Elseya. The species Elseya schultzei has also long been seen as synonymous with this species; however, recent studies have shown this to be incorrect. Therefore, that species was recently removed from synonymy, further revision of the New Guinea Elseya the species has been made type species for a new subgenus (Hanwarachelys) which also contains Elseya schultzei and Elseya rhodini.

=== Synonymy ===
- Platemys novaeguineae (Meyer 1871:128)
  - Emydura novaeguineae Boulenger 1888:450
  - Elseya novaeguineae Goode 1967:ix
  - Elseya latisternum novaeguineae Blackmore 1969:282
  - Elseya novaeguinea Burbidge et al. 1974:393 (ex-errore)
  - Elseya dentata novaeguineae Obst 1985:223
  - Elseya (Hanwarachelys) novaeguineae (restricted, Thomson et al. 2015)

== See also ==
- Yolarnie Amepou
