= Elseya flaviventralis =

Scientific classification
- Domain: Eukaryota
- Kingdom: Animalia
- Phylum: Chordata
- Class: Reptilia
- Order: Testudines
- Suborder: Pleurodira
- Family: Chelidae
- Genus: Elseya
- Subgenus: Elseya
- Species: E. flaviventralis

Binomial name
- Elseya flaviventralis Thomson & Georges, 2016

Species of turtle

Elseya flaviventralis, the yellow bellied snapping turtle, is a species of large river snapping turtles from the Arnhem Land region of the Northern Territory of Australia. It is a member of the nominate subgenus Elseya.

== Etymology ==
This species is named for the yellow colored plastron unique among the Australian members of the genus. All other members having at least some degree of black coloration.
