= Paul Igag =

Papuan ornithologist (1964–2010)

Paul Igag (February 24, 1964 – October 29, 2010) was a Papuan ornithologist.

Igag was born in Krangket village, Madang Province of Papua New Guinea. He was Papua New Guinea's first national expert on birds, who held a PhD from Madang province. He was one of the first scientific staff at the young Research and Conservation Foundation of Papua New Guinea, then he became one of the first scientific staff at the Wildlife Conservation Society Papua New Guinea Programme, and later on became a founder of the Papua New Guinea Institute of Biological Research. He participated in a documentary film called Birds of the Gods, which was directed and hosted by David Attenborough and was released on November 18, 2010.

He died suddenly on October 29, 2010, at the age of 46, in Goroka after suffering pains in his chest. Igag's body was returned to Krangket, where he was laid to rest. His contributions to ornithology were recognized with the dedication of a special issue of Emu - Austral Ornithology to him.
