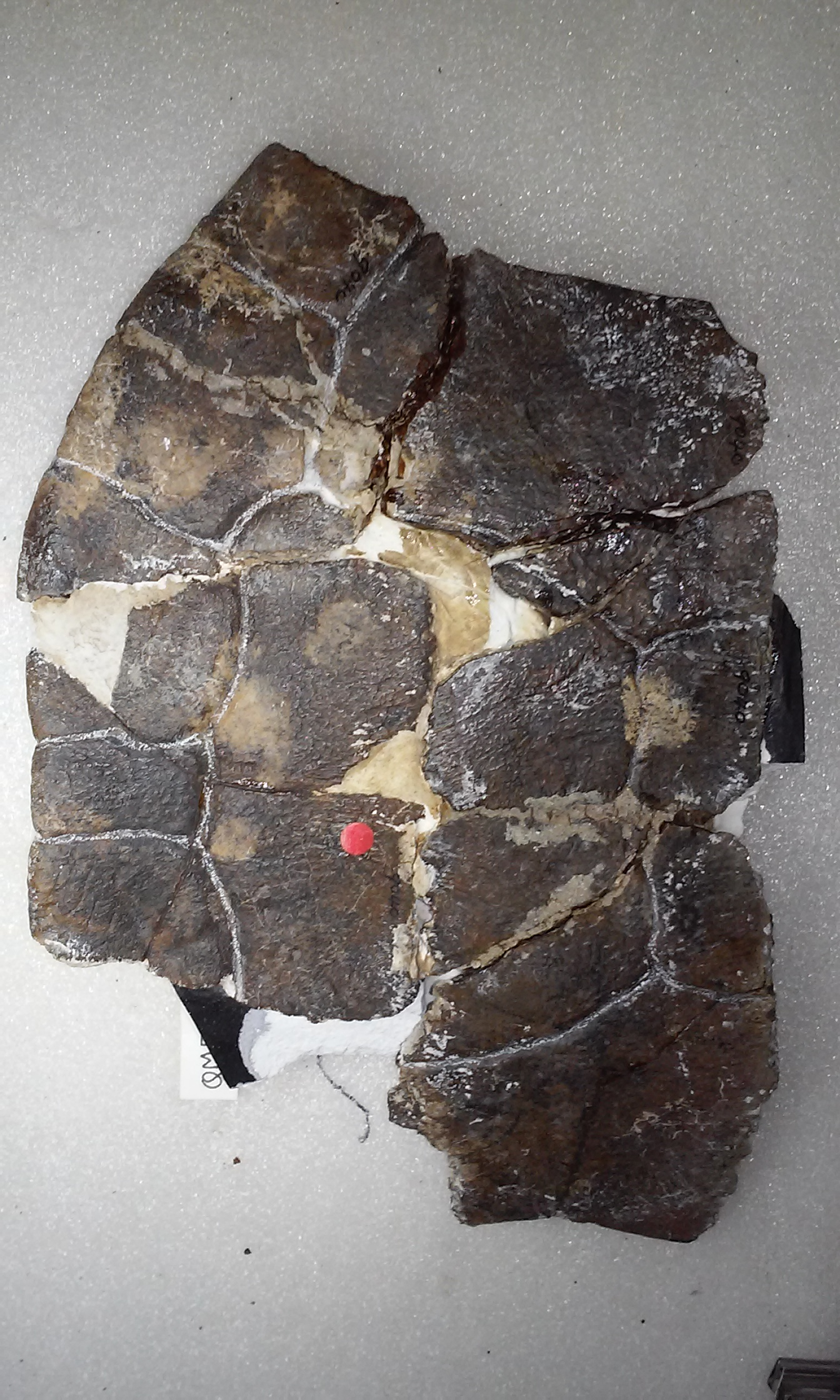

Scientific classification
- Kingdom: Animalia
- Phylum: Chordata
- Order: Testudines
- Suborder: Pleurodira
- Family: Chelidae
- Genus: Elseya
- Subgenus: Pelocomastes
- Species: E. uberrima

Binomial name
- Elseya uberrima (De Vis, 1897)

= Elseya uberrima =

Elseya uberrima Temporal range: Pliocene

Extinct species of turtle

Elseya uberrima is a Pliocene species of extinct Australian snapping turtle.

== Taxonomy ==
During his time at the Queensland Museum, Charles Walter De Vis described a number of fossil turtles from the Darling Downs region of Queensland, Australia. All four species described were declared a single diagnosable species by Thomson, 2000.

To avoid confusion, the synonymy for the species is:

- Elseya uberrima (De Vis, 1897)
  - Chelymys uberrima De Vis, 1897: 3
  - Chelymys antiqua De Vis 1897: 4
  - Chelymys arata De Vis 1897: 5
  - Pelocomastes ampla De Vis 1897: 6–7

This synonymy has made the generic name Pelocomastes a junior synonym of Elseya, and in their recent revision of that genus, Thomson et al. (2015) resurrected Pelocomastes as a subgenus to represent the Queensland clade of the Elseya. Therefore, Elseya (Pelocomastes) uberrima is the type species for this subgenus.

A) Lectotype of E. uberrima; B) lectotype of E. arata; C-D) dorsal and ventral views of the lectotype of P. ampla
