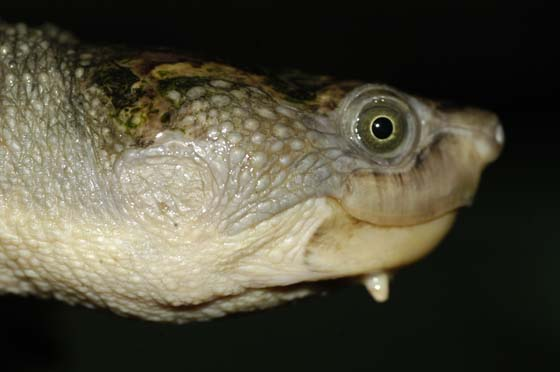

Conservation status
- Least Concern (IUCN 2.3)

Scientific classification
- Kingdom: Animalia
- Phylum: Chordata
- Class: Reptilia
- Order: Testudines
- Suborder: Pleurodira
- Family: Chelidae
- Genus: Elseya
- Subgenus: Hanwarachelys
- Species: E. schultzei

Binomial name
- Elseya schultzei (T. Vogt, 1911)

Synonyms
- Emydura schultzei T. Vogt 1911; Elseya schultzei — TTWG, 2014; Elsya (Hanwarachelys) schultzei — Thomson et al., 2015

= Elseya schultzei =

Species of New Guinea turtle

Elseya schultzei, commonly known as the Northern New Guinea snapping turtle or Schultze's snapping turtle, is a species of chelid turtle endemic to northern New Guinea.

== Etymology ==
The specific name, schultzei, is in honor of German ethnographer Leonhard Schultze-Jena.

== Taxonomy ==
E. schultzei has been largely considered as the same species as Elseya novaeguineae. However, recent studies such as Todd et al. (2013) and Georges et al. (2014) have shown that the species is distinct. Therefore, in their recent revision of the New Guinea Elseya the species was resurrected and restricted to the regions north of the Central Ranges of New Guinea.

== Geographic range ==
E. schulzei is found in New Guinea and Indonesia to the north of the central mountain ranges. It is separated geographically from Elseya novaeguineae, which is only found in West Irian, Indonesia, to the west of the central range and from Elseya rhodini which is only found to the south of the central ranges.

== See also ==
- Yolarnie Amepou
