= Bluff Downs fossil site =

Paleontological site in Queensland, Australia

Coordinates: 19°41′S 145°33′E

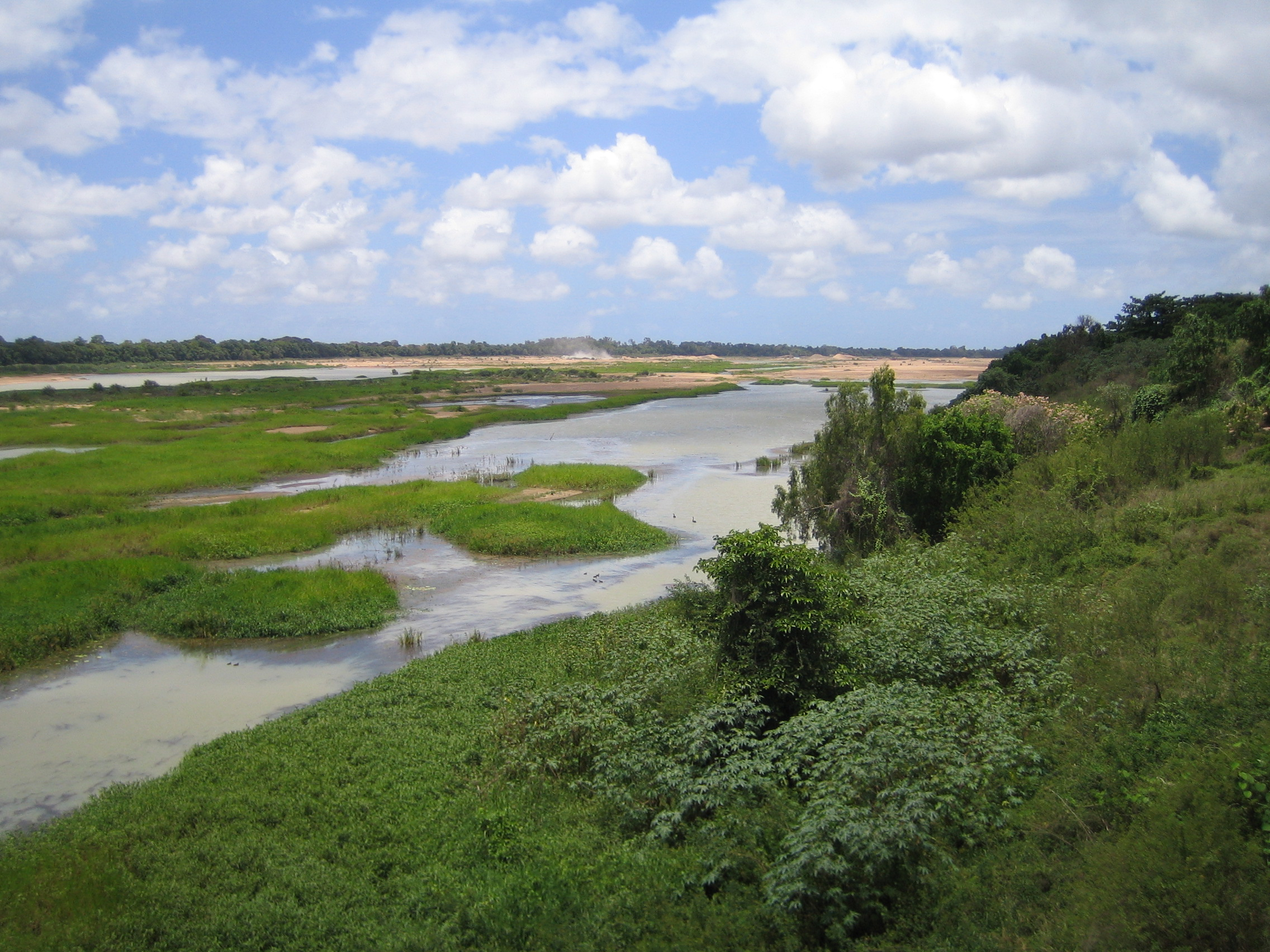
The Burdekin River in northern Queensland, of which the Allingham Creek is a tributary

The Bluff Downs fossil site is a paleontological site of Pliocene age in northern Queensland, Australia. It is one of the most significant fossil sites of Pliocene age in Australia due to its unique fauna and specific dating. The fossil site lies on the banks of the Allingham Creek on the pastoral property of Bluff Downs Station, northwest of Charters Towers on the Cape York Peninsula

== Dating ==
Precise dating of vertebrate fossil sites in Australia is rare, and many Cenozoic-age sediments remain undated. As of 2000, only two Pliocene vertebrate-bearing fossil faunas were specifically dated, Bluff Downs Local Fauna and the Hamilton Local Fauna in Victoria. Unusually, the Bluff Downs Local Fauna have been specifically dated. This is because there is a minimum age control in the form of a basalt layer (the Bluff Downs Flow) directly overlies the fossiliferous deposit. According to stratigraphy, the fossils must have been deposited before the basalt and thus, since the Bluff Downs Flow has been dated to 3.62 ±0.5 million years old; the fossils were deposited prior to this. The fossils were also deposited directly above another basalt flow, the Allensleigh Flow, allowing a maximum age control. The fossils were likely deposited between 5.2 and 3.6 million years ago during the late Pliocene period, which matches dates estimated through biocorrelation. The Allingham Formation has been radiometrically dated to no less than 4 ±0.12 million years old, placing it in the early Pliocene

== Geology ==
=== Volcanic Activity and Basalt Flows ===
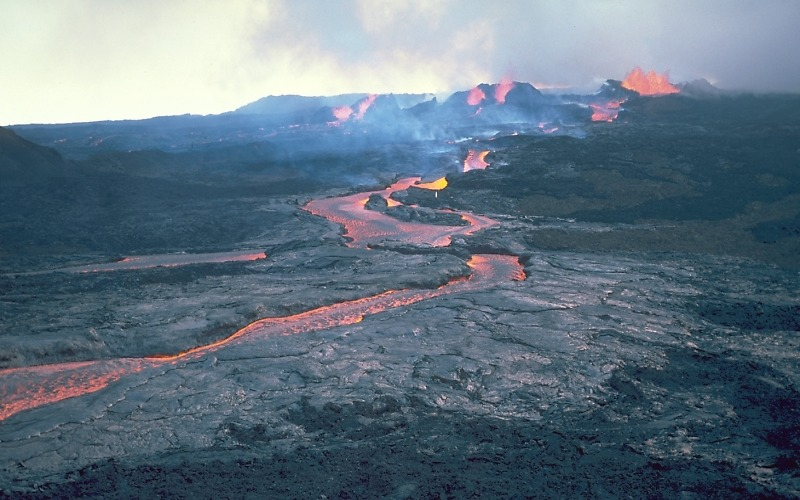
A lava flow at Mauna Loa, similar to those which formed the basalt deposits of northern Queensland

Bluff Downs fossil site describes a layer of fossiliferous sediment dating to the late Pliocene era that is sandwiched between basalt flows within the Nulla Basalt Province. Late Cenozoic basalts cover more than 28,000 square kilometres in northern Queensland, and were divided into four physiographic provinces and given relative ages by Twidale in 1956; the McBride, Chudleigh, Sturgeon and Nulla Basalt provinces. This basalt is present due to volcanic activity from at least four separate periods, the most recent of which was approximately 13,000 years ago, based on radiocarbon dating of sediment under the youngest of the flows, the Toomba flow. There was significant volcanic activity in the region 4.5-4.0, 2.3, 1.3 and 1.1 million years ago. Four million years ago, the landscape of northern Queensland would have been similar to Hawaii, with frequent lava flows, especially since the basalts were related to a central type of eruption not to fissures, and therefore were similar to those which can be observed today at Mauna Loa. The vents which the lavas came from appear to follow existing lineaments following a north-east direction in the valley, which lies on the eastern flank of the Great Dividing Range, and were at the head of this valley.

The lavas themselves are relatively thin, at a thickness of 30 metres to the east of Allensleigh but only 4 metres near Bluff Downs Station., this likely being due to the underlying topography. They form large plateaux which were noted by Twidale as peripherally dissected, and of a vesicular amygdaloidal nature with vivianite, zeolites and chalcedonic silica commonly found within amygdales. Bluff Downs Fossil Site is located within the Nulla Basalt Province.

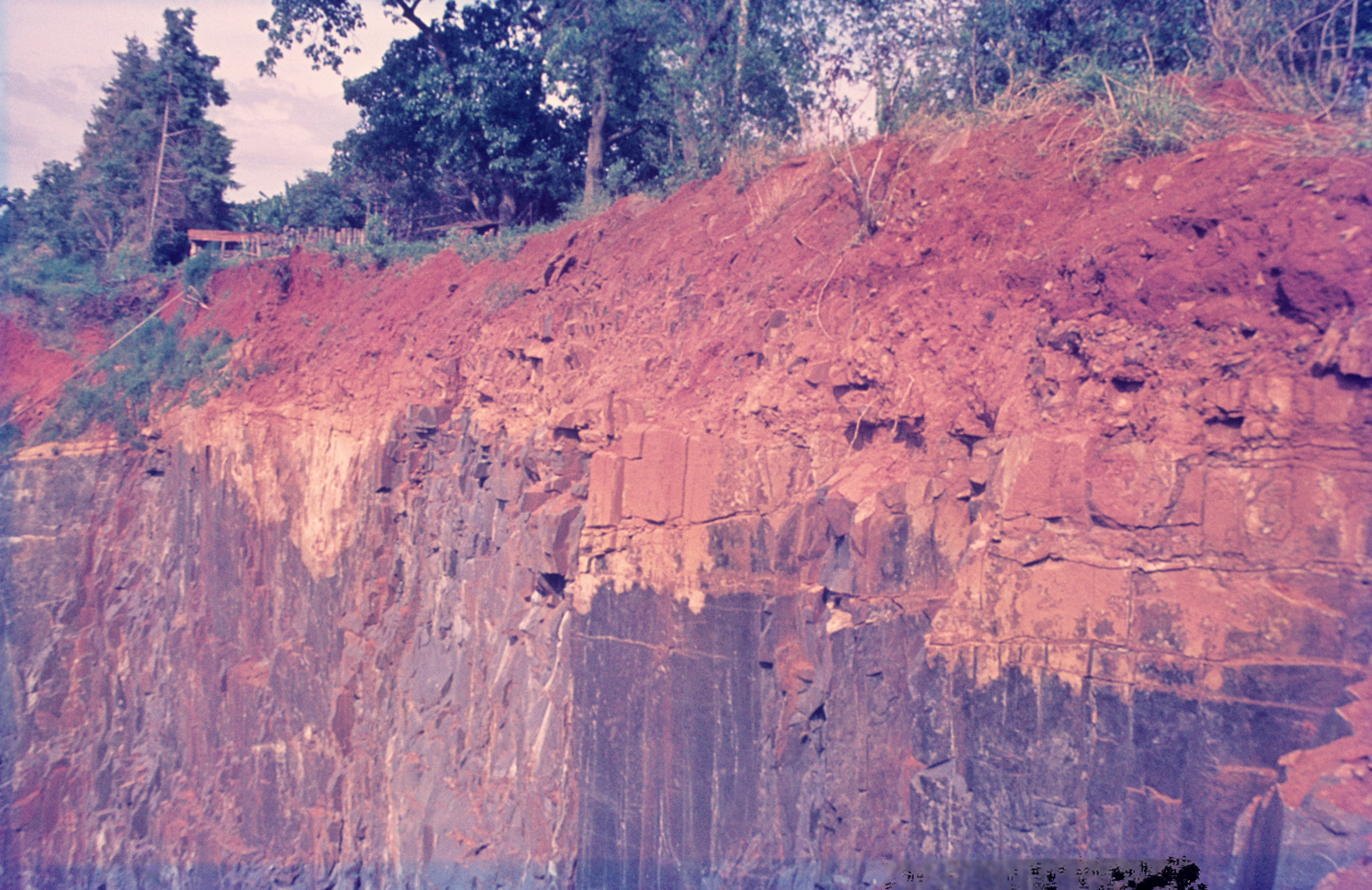
Laterite formation on basalt in Brasil, similar to lateritised sediments at Bluff Downs fossil site

==== Nulla Basalt Province ====
The Nulla Basalt Province covers approximately 4200 square kilometres and is dated to the late Pliocene or early Pleistocene and consists of multiple olivine basalt flows as the result of lava flows associated with volcanic activity 4.5-4.0, 2.3, 1.3 and 1.1 million years ago, according to radiogenic argon determination dating. The dating of these flows matches the ordering suggested by analysis of aerial photographs. The flows, which include the Allensleigh Flow and Bluff Downs Flow, overlie uneven Palaeozoic sedimentary, igneous and metamorphic rocks as well as sediments from the early Cenozoic, all of which have been weathered (lateritised) due to a humid and tropical palaeoenvironment.

===== Allensleigh Flow =====
The Allensleigh flow is the oldest and most widespread basalt flow in the Nulla Province, and responsible for the deposition of the Allingham Formation and thus, the presence of fossils, as it obliterated a channel, damming and causing drainage of the ancestral Burdekin River at the time of deposition. The flow is associated with the eruption that occurred between 4.5 and 4.0 million years ago.

===== Bluff Downs Flow =====
The Bluff Downs Flow is a basalt flow that directly overlies the Allingham Formation, and is dated to 3.62 ± 0.5 million years ago. Its position directly above the fossiliferous sediment helped to protect the fossils from erosion, thus ensuring their survival.

=== The Allingham Formation ===
The Allingham Formation, named by Archer and Wade in 1976, is a lake and stream deposit within the Nulla Basalt Province, containing the fossils which the Bluff Downs Local Fauna are attributed to. It consists of a mixture of sediment that originated on land and was washed away after eroding into nearby waterbodies (terrigenous sediment), clays, silts, sands (including calcareous sands), and Chara limestones (calcareous nodules that were deposited directly over the fossiliferous sediment and consequently overlain by basalt). These sediments were formed in lakes and rivers (i.e. are lacustrine and fluviatile), indicating the presence of various water bodies such as lakes, rivers and streams in the palaeoenvironment at the time of deposition. There were several different depositional events and analysis of the sediments suggests that during the early Pliocene, a stream widened to form a shallow lake. The formation could be as young as 4.0 to 3.6 million years old, with the fossils were likely deposited at the lower end of the period between 5.2 and 3.6 million years ago.

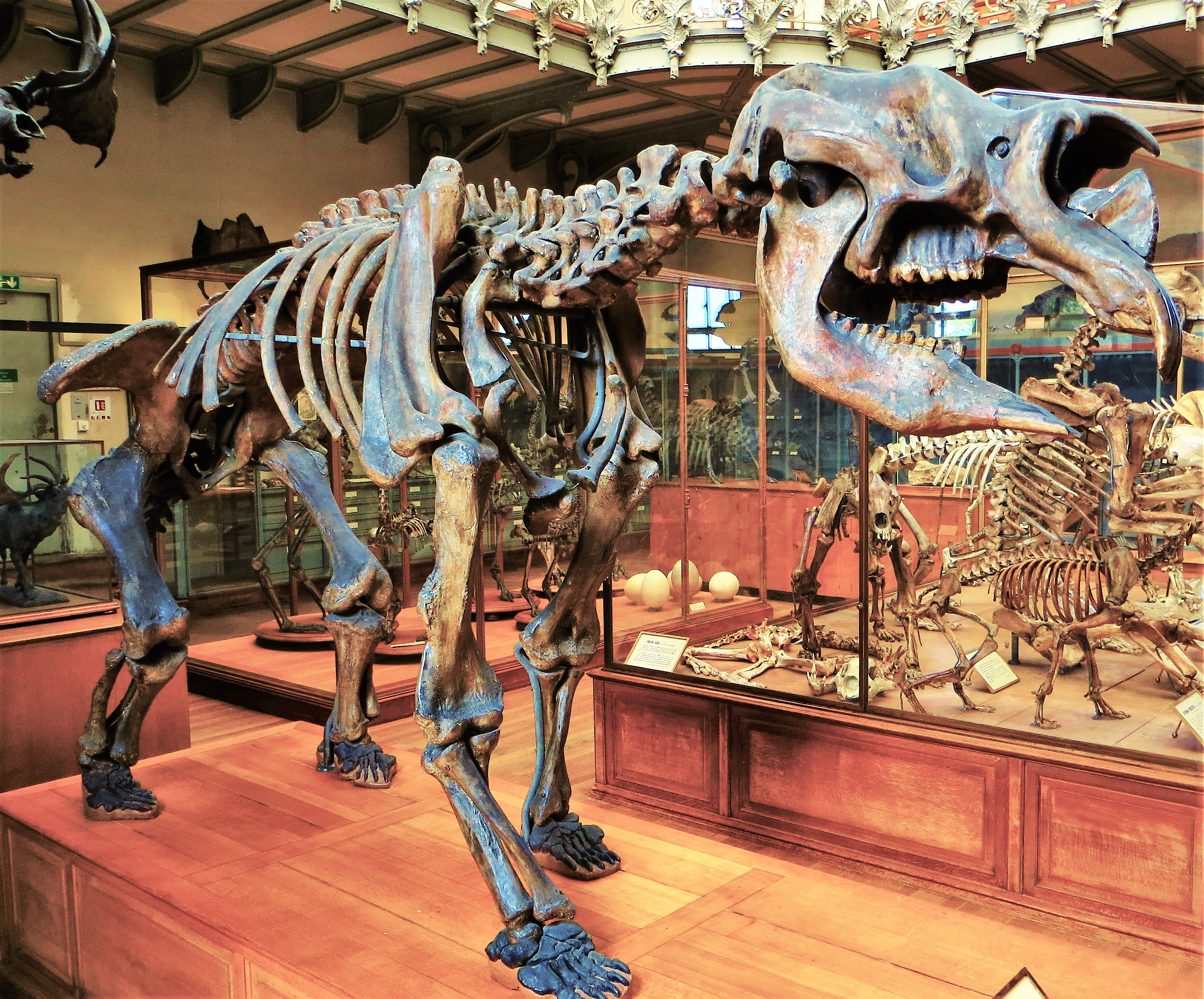
Skeleton of diprotodon optatum, an Australian megafaunal species

== Fossils ==
The fossils found at Bluff Downs fossil site consist of a diverse range of vertebrates dating to the Pliocene, found in the terrigenous sediments of the Allingham Formation. These include both broken and complete bones and skulls, though articulated skeletons (with the bones in the same position as upon the organism's death) are rare, and most organisms are found as isolated floats. Fossils were first discovered, collected and reported to the Queensland Museum in 1973. The Bluff Downs Local Fauna is derived from the vertebrate species found in the Allingham Formation.

== Bluff Downs Local Fauna ==
The Bluff Downs Local Fauna, named and described by Archer in 1976, includes numerous vertebrate species found at the Bluff Downs Fossil Site, many of which are similar to but slightly older than the Chinchilla fauna (associated with Chinchilla Fossil Site, also in Queensland), according to more ancestral physical features. This assemblage was noted to be considerably biodiverse by Archer, and features many ancestors of the species we now recognise as uniquely Australian, as well as unusual extinct species of megafauna, such as Diprotodonts and Thylacoleonids.

The Bluff Downs Local Fauna originally identified by Archer featured 22 taxa with 12 mammals, but this has since been expanded by further discoveries at the site. The fauna includes a wide range of marsupials from families that are still alive today (extant) as well as extinct families, and is typical of Australian Pliocene-era faunas. Several large reptilian predators, such as crocodiles and a giant varanid (monitor lizard), have been found, which has long puzzled palaeontologists as no large predatory terrestrial mammals have been found at the site.

=== Taxa Identified in 1976 ===
Below is a table of the taxa that were identified by Archer in 1976 and formed the Bluff Downs Local Fauna at that time. Various species within this table have since been confirmed and additional finds of fossils have led to greater biodiversity identified at the site.

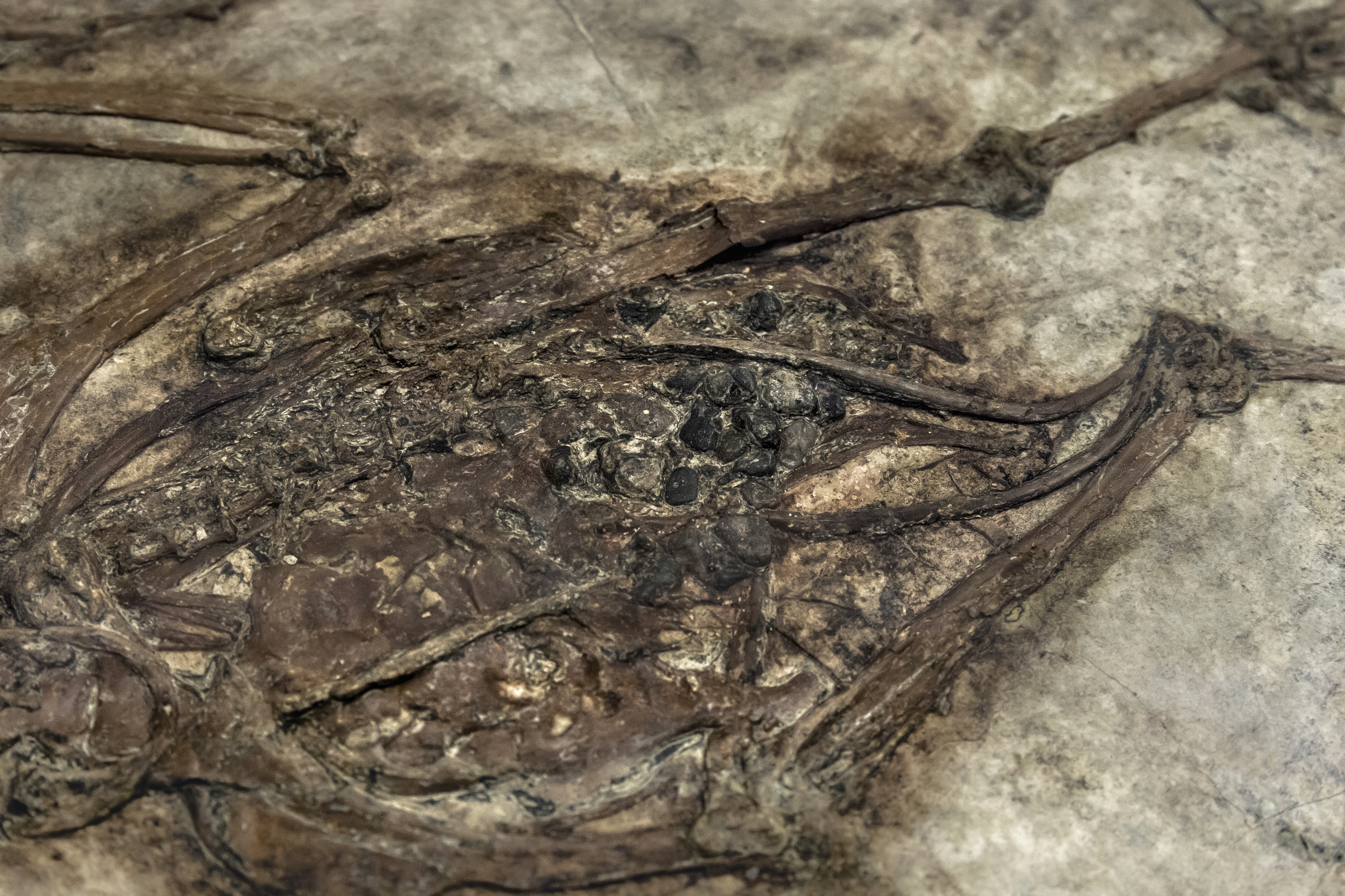
Gastroliths found within the ribcage of a Cretaceous-era waterbird: gastroliths are commonly used by herbivorous species lacking chewing abilities to grind food in the stomach

==== Invertebrate ====
Phylum	Subphylum	Fossil Finds	Species
Arthropoda	Crustacea	Gastroliths	Unidentified species: Crayfish commonly use gastoliths

==== Vertebrate ====
Superclass	Infraclass	Fossil Finds
Osteichthys	Teleostei	Spines and vertebra

Class	Family	Fossil Finds	Species and additional information
Reptilia	Chelidae	Most common fossils found at the site are fragments of shells	Chelodina sp.: 3 different chelid taxa have been identified (this is not unusual for a tropical river system, many of which have 4 or more genera within the same region)
Reptilia	Crododilidae	Crocodile teeth second most common fossils, likely multiple species, large vertebrae, limb bones, scutes, skull fragments	Palimnarchus sp. (megafaunal crodidilian): 3 taxa have since been identified: Pallimnarchus, Crodoylus porosus, Quinkana babarre (mekosuchine); a metatarsal was recovered in 1992 with significant trauma likely associated with intraspecific attacks e.g. territorial disputes
Reptilia	Agamidae	Small dentary fragment with seven teeth	Unidentified species: similar to Amphibolorus
Reptilia	Varanidae	Two vertebrae, a tooth that is twice as large as teeth of a seven foot Varanus salvadorii	Megalania sp. (giant goanna)
Reptilia	Boidae	Three vertebrae, very large	Bluff Downs Giant Python (Liasis dubudingala): similar to Morelia, vertebrae are unique from Australian pythons; an opportunistic feeder capable of climbing trees
Reptilia	Elapidae	Two small vertebrae	Unidentified species: venomous snakes e.g. cobras, similar to Pseudechis
Aves	Circoniidae	Tarsometatarsus	Xenorhyncus asiaticus (Blackheaded Stork)
Mammalia	Peramelidae	Isolated molar	Perameles allinghamensis (Bluff Downs Bandicoot)
	Vombatidae	Left dentary with four molars	Phascolonus lemley (megafaunal wombat)
	Phascolarctidae	Isolated molar	Koobor jimbarrati (small koala)
	Thylacoleonidae	Dentary fragment	Thylacoleo sp. (very small marsupial lion)
	Macopodidae	Partial jaw, several teeth	Protemnodon sp. (short-faced kangaroo)
		Fragmented dentaries and jaw	Macropus sp.: similar to Macropus dryas
		Isolated molar	Macropus sp.: similar to Macropus woodsi
		Two isolated molars	Thylogale (pademelon)
		Isolated molar	Small macropodine
	Diprotodontidae	Isolated premolar	Zygomaturus sp.
		One complete, two partial skulls, several dentaries, isolated teeth	Euryzygoma sp.
		Dentary fragments	Nototheriine, indeterminate genus
	Unidentified Families	Tooth fragments	Numbigilga ernielundeliusi: dental features cannot be referred to any family known from Bluff Downs or any other fossil site in Australia; otherwise unknown family, medium to large sized, probably marsupial, twinned cusps (some perameloids and phascolarctids)
Unidentified Class	Unidentified Families	Coprolites	Unidentified species: medium to large sized animal e.g. crocodilian, large snake, diprotodontid, deposited in water, some deposited on ground and carried into water

Other taxa of note include;

- possums: a pseudocheirid possum, Pseudochirops winteri, one of two arboreal mammals (the other being a phalangerid)
- darters: uncommon in the avian fossil record, these birds are primarily fish eating (piscivorous) and need smooth and open water to feed; they commonly live by permanent water bodies

== Palaeoenvironment ==
The palaeoenvironment of Bluff Downs during the Pliocene featured large water bodies and riparian forests. This is inferred from the presence of certain species which have specialised habitats, as well as the nature of the sediments within the Allingham Formation. The presence of fluviatile and lacustrine sedimentary deposits as well as presence of certain species such as pygmy geese and darters confirms the presence of extensive permanent water bodies, and short-necked chelids and long-necked tortoises suggest shallow, turbid lagoon were a feature of the prehistoric landscape. There was persistent freshwater in the region as fossils of Chara flora, crustaceans and fish have been found and short-necked chelids also indicate presence of well developed rivers, creeks and lagoons with abundant aquatic fauna. The area experienced a high level of precipitation and humidity, and the palaeoenvironment was similar to present-day Kakadu, and many species are similar across these two locations.

Mammals associated with terrestrial and arboreal habitats, such as ringtail possums, indicate that there was some closed forest habitat present. This forest would have been river-based (riparian) rainforest, and formed a minor component of the palaeoenvironment, as the paucity of possum fossils despite the use of screen washing of sediments suggests.
