= Peter Ouwens =

Dutch scientist

Pieter Anthonis Ouwens (14 February 1849, Amsterdam – 5 March 1922, Buitenzorg) was a Dutch scientist and Director of the Java Zoological Museum and Botanical Gardens. He is best known for writing the first formal description of the Komodo dragon (Varanus komodoensis) in 1912.

== Family ==
Ouwens was the child of Pieter Anthonis Ouwens, accountant in Amsterdam, and Caroline Reiniera Nagels. He studied at the Royal Military Academy in Breda from 1867. In 1871, he became lieutenant at the Infantry in the Dutch East Indies and by 1883 he had been promoted to captain. In January 1879 he married Johanna Vosmaer at Banda Aceh. They divorced a month after the birth of their only child in 1882 in Salatiga and Ouwens remarried Jeanne Dikkers in December 1883 in Purworejo. He remarried again in 1902 with Anna Josephina Soesman.

== Komodo dragon ==
He eventually became curator of the Zoological Museum in Buitenzorg (now Bogor). As such he received a photo and a skin of a Komodo dragon from Lieutenant Jacques Karel Henri van Steyn van Hensbroek who had been the first Westerner to observe the lizards and had been told that they could reach 6 to 7 meters. Ouwens dispatched a collector to Komodo who returned to Java with two adults and a young specimen. Ouwens named the species Varanus komodoensis in a publication of 1912. Ouwens became Officer of the Order of Orange-Nassau and died in Buitenzorg in 1922.
