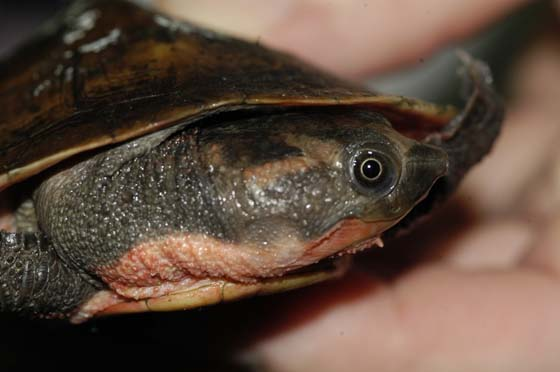

Scientific classification
- Domain: Eukaryota
- Kingdom: Animalia
- Phylum: Chordata
- Class: Reptilia
- Order: Testudines
- Suborder: Pleurodira
- Family: Chelidae
- Genus: Elseya
- Subgenus: Hanwarachelys
- Species: E. rhodini

Binomial name
- Elseya rhodini Thomson et al. 2015

= Elseya rhodini =

Species of New Guinea turtle

Elseya rhodini, the southern New Guinea stream turtle, is a recently described aquatic species of chelid turtle (Austro-South American side necks) found south of the central ranges of New Guinea. It inhabits small streams that flow into the major river drainage's south of the ranges.

== Etymology ==
The species was named in honor of Anders G. J. Rhodin the chairman emeritus of the IUCN Species Survival Commission Tortoise and Freshwater Turtle Specialist Group (TFTSG) and founder of the Chelonian Research Foundation (CRF) which publish the journal Chelonian Conservation and Biology he had in the past also been involved in research in Papua New Guinea having described the species Chelodina parkeri and Chelodina pritchardi.

== Taxonomy ==
Only recently separated from the western New Guinea stream turtle, Elseya novaeguineae, it was demonstrated that the Elseya of New Guinea were long term inhabitants of the island and had been subject to the major vicariance events from the formation of the Central Ranges. The degree of divergence was consistent between the molecular and morphological data and as such the species Elseya schultzei was resurrected and this new species was also described. In recognition of the three major clades within the Elseya that have been informally named for many years as the Queensland Elseya, New Guinea Elseya and northern Elseya names were formally applied to these clades. Elseya rhodini was placed in a new subgenus Hanwarachelys along with Elseya novaeguineae and Elseya schultzei.

== See also ==
- Yolarnie Amepou
