= International Union of Biological Sciences =

International non-governmental organization

International Union of Biological Sciences: Internationale Union der biologischen Wissenschaften (in German); Union internationale des sciences biologiques (in French); União Internacional de Ciências Biológicas (in Portuguese); Международный союз биологических наук (in Russian); 国际生物科学联合会 (in Chinese)
- Formation: 1919; 107 years ago
- Headquarters: Paris, France
- Members: 44 national members, 80 scientific members
- President: Karl-Josef DIETZ
- Vice-President: Le Kang
- Secretary-General: Renee BORGES
- Treasurer: Moemen S. Hanafy
- Website: www.iubs.org

The International Union of Biological Sciences ( IUBS ) is a non-profit organization and non-governmental organization founded in 1919 that promotes biological sciences internationally. As a scientific umbrella organization, it was a founding member of the International Council for Science (ICSU).

== History ==
The Union was founded in 1919 following the work of the Conference of Allied Academies of Sciences held in Brussels. Originally, the 'S' was not for 'Science' but for 'Societies'. After defining its constitution and organization in 1925, the IUBS adheres to the International Research Council (International Council for Science), which is now known as the International Council of Scientific Unions (ICSU). From 1925 to 1939, the IUBS worked on two main themes: information science and environment. This second project resulted in the creation of the World Conservation Union.

== Networking and cooperation ==
The Union was a founding member of the ICSU Scientific Committee and works closely with UNESCO. It also maintains relations with the World Health Organization (WHO), the Food and Agriculture Organization (FAO), and the United Nations Environment Programme (UNEP). It cooperates with the European Commission and numerous other organizations, agencies, and foundations.

== Organisation ==
The Union currently consists of:

- 44 national members, consisting of national science academies, research and scientific organizations; and
- 80 scientific members, including international scientific associations, societies or commissions of the various biological disciplines, from biology to zoology. New members are allowed under strict scientific guidelines.

The national and the academic members bring areas of biological science to the attention of the Union. The Union then reviews the members' suggestions. Approval is given in the General Assembly and the project progresses through conferences and then implementation through funding agencies.

=== Board ===
The Executive Committee consists of: the President, the former president, two Vice-Presidents, the Secretary, the Treasurer and other members of the Extended Board. The Board meets annually. The Secretariat, with its Executive Director coordinates the programs and activities.

=== General Assembly ===
In the General Assembly, each national member has one vote. The scientific members are invited to send one representative each to the talks and make programmatic proposals. The General Assembly elects the Executive Board for the proposed projects, selects the scientific programs of the Union, reviews the progress of scientific programs, collaborates with other international organizations and decides on the allocation of funding. The General Assembly takes place in parallel to a scientific conference, organized in cooperation with the National Union Committee of the host country.

=== International Federation of Mammalogists ===
The International Federation of Mammalogists (IFM) was founded in 1974 as the Theriology (Mammalogy) section. In 2006, it was separated, still under the guiding authority of the IUBS, and the name was changed. The International Theriological Congresses, now the International Mammalogical Congresses, were organized in 1974 with the first event (IMC 1) held in Moscow. Events were held in Brno in 1978, Helsinki 1982, Edmonton 1985, Rome 1989, Sydney 1993, Acapulco 1997, Sun City 2001, Sapporo 2005, Mendoza 2009, Belfast 2013 (IMC 11), Perth 2017 (IMC 12), Anchorage 2023 (IMC 13) in the Dena’ina Civic and Convention Center

== Programmes ==
The scientific programmes of the General Assembly are approved in accordance with the Statutes of the Union.

=== Examples of programmes ===
Diversitas, Human Dimensions of Biodiversity, Climate Change Integrative Biology (ICCB), Systematics Agenda, Biological Education (BioED), IUBS Bioethics Ethics Committee earlier, Bionomenclature, Biology and Traditional Knowledge, Biological Consequences of Global Change (BCGC) Darwin200, Biosystematics, Species 2000, Genomics and Evolution, Modernizing the codes to meet future needs of scientific communities (Biocode), Biology Research and Education Resources in Africa, Reproductive Biology, Aquaculture, Bio-Energy and Towards an Integrative Biology (TAIB), Global Species List Working Group (GSLWG).

== Publications ==
The institution publishes four times a year Biology International and other publications such as the IUBS Monograph Series, Methodology Manual Series and the Proceedings of the IUBS General Assemblies.

== See also ==
- Academy of Sciences
