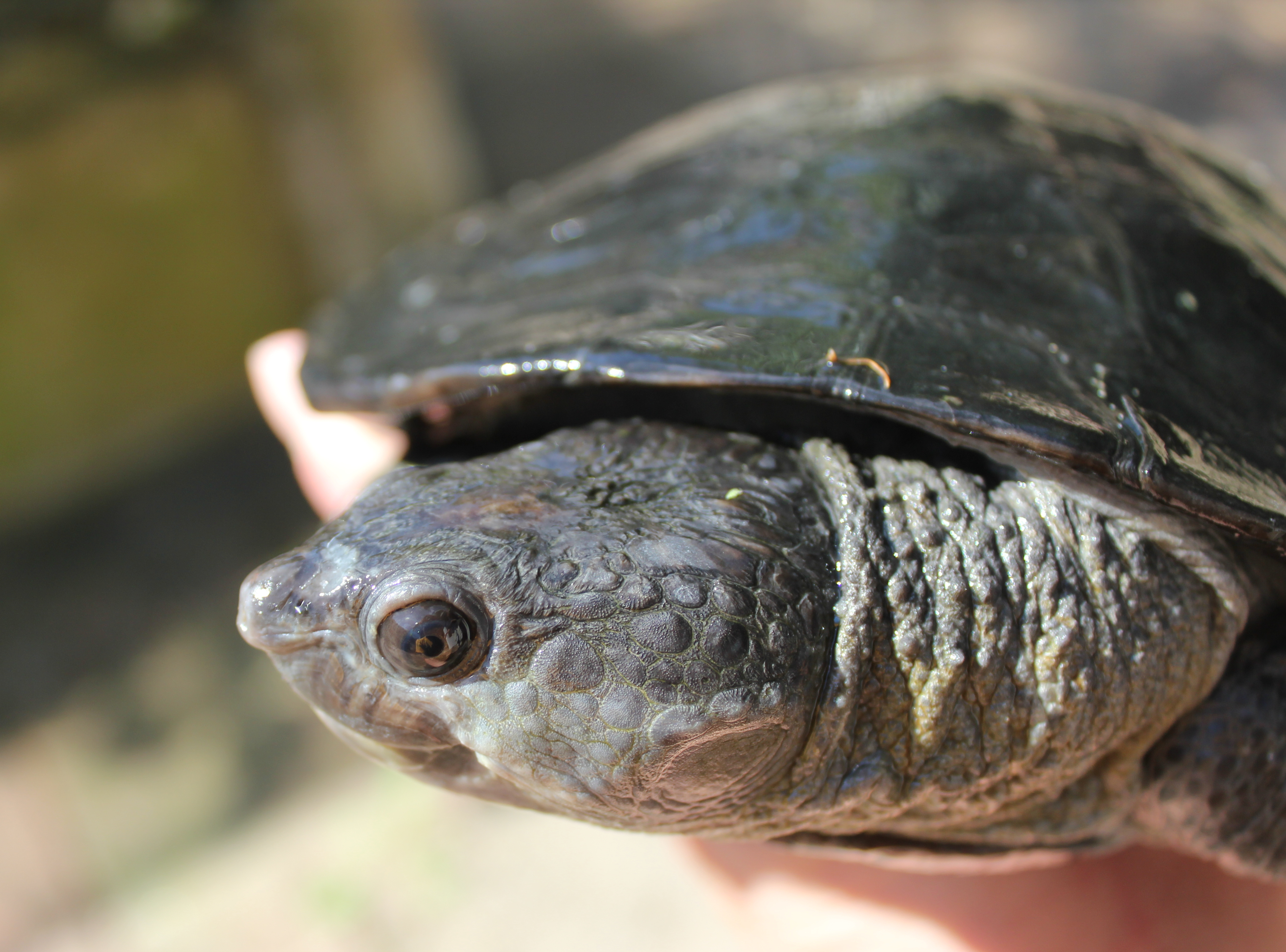
- Captive ''Elseya dentata in Australia.

Conservation status
- Least Concern (IUCN 2.3)

Scientific classification
- Domain: Eukaryota
- Kingdom: Animalia
- Phylum: Chordata
- Class: Reptilia
- Order: Testudines
- Suborder: Pleurodira
- Family: Chelidae
- Genus: Elseya
- Subgenus: Elseya
- Species: E. dentata

Binomial name
- Elseya dentata (Gray, 1863)

Synonyms
- Chelymys dentata Gray 1863:98; Chelymys elseyi Gray 1864:132 (nomen nudum); Chelymys elseya Gray 1870:76 (nomen nudum); Elseya intermedia Gray 1872:23

= Elseya dentata =

Species of turtle

Elseya dentata (Gray, 1863), the northern snapping turtle, is a large aquatic turtle found throughout many rivers in northern Western Australia and the Northern Territory. It is one of three species in the nominate subgenus Elseya.

== Etymology ==
This species is named for the serrated margin of the shell, mostly only visible in younger animals.

== Taxonomy ==
During their revision of the New Guinea Elseya a lectotype was set for this species. Further it was placed in a subgenus and as the type species of the genus it is therefore in the nominate subgenus.
