= Scott A. Thomson =

Australian herpetologist

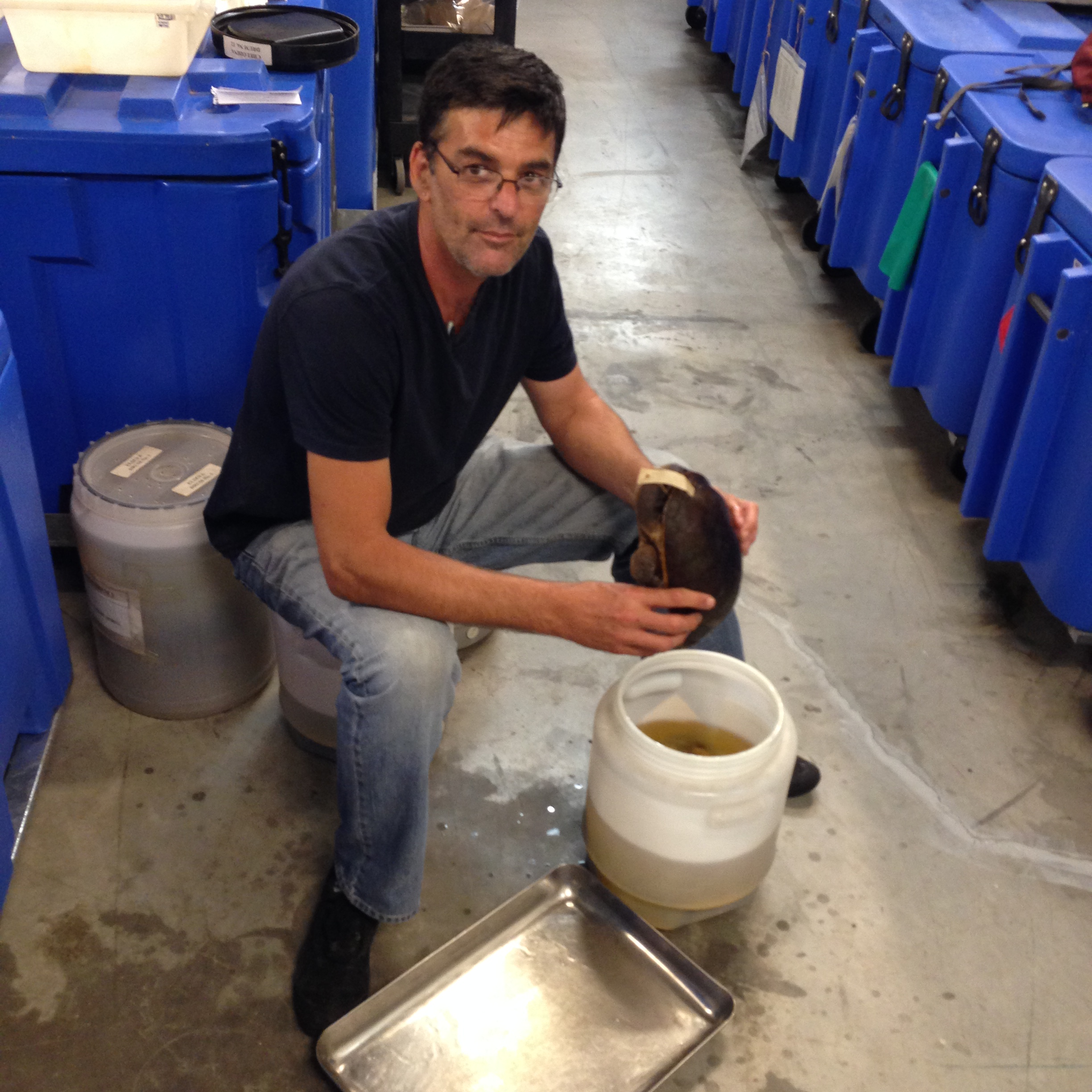
- Education: University of Canberra (B.Sc., M.Sc.)
- Scientific career
- Fields: Herpetology, taxonomy, palaeontology
- Workplaces: Institute for Applied Ecology at University of Canberra, Museum of Zoology of the University of São Paulo, Chelonian Research Institute

Scott A. Thomson is an Australian herpetologist, paleontologist, and taxonomist, specialising in turtles of the family Chelidae.

== Education ==
Thomson attended the University of Canberra for both his bachelor's and master's degrees in applied sciences, studying zoology and mathematics.

== Career ==
Thomson is a researcher at the Museum of Zoology of the University of São Paulo and curator at the Chelonian Research Institute in Oviedo, Florida. He is active in resolving nomenclatural issues, a member of the Tortoise and Freshwater Turtle Specialist Group of the IUCN's Species Survival Commission, and co-author of the 2015 checklist of extinct Pleistocene and Holocene turtles. Thomson advocates for science-based rather than political- or conservation-driven taxonomy.

Thomson has described several extant and fossil turtles, including:

- Chelodina burrungandjii Thomson, Kennett, and Georges 2000 – Arnhem snake-necked turtle, sandstone snake-necked turtle
- Chelodina canni McCord and Thomson 2002 – Cann's snake-necked turtle
- Chelodina (Chelydera) Thomson and Georges 2020
- Elseya (Hanwarachelys) Thomson et al. 2015
- Elseya albagula Thomson, Georges, and Limpus 2006 – white-throated snapping turtle, southern snapping turtle
- Elseya flaviventralis Thomson and Georges 2016 – yellow-bellied snapping turtle
- †Elseya nadibajagu Thomson and Mackness 1999 – ancient snapping turtle
- Elseya rhodini Thomson et al. 2015 – southern New Guinea stream turtle, Rhodin's stream turtle
- Myuchelys Thomson and Georges 2009
- †Rheodytes devisi Thomson 2000 – DeVis' river diver
