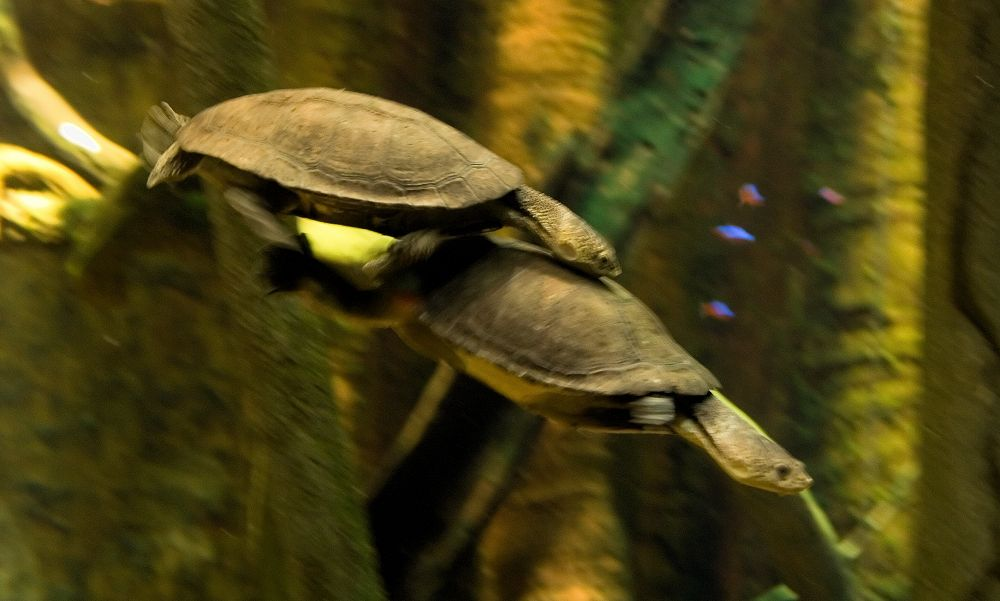

Conservation status
- Least Concern (IUCN 2.3)

Scientific classification
- Kingdom: Animalia
- Phylum: Chordata
- Class: Reptilia
- Order: Testudines
- Suborder: Pleurodira
- Family: Chelidae
- Genus: Phrynops
- Species: P. tuberosus

Binomial name
- Phrynops tuberosus (W. Peters, 1870)

Synonyms
- Species synonymy: Platemys tuberosa W. Peters, 1870; Hydraspis tuberosa — Gray, 1870; Phrynops tuberosa — Stejneger, 1909; Phrynops geoffroana tuberosa — L. Müller, 1939; Phrynops geoffroanus tuberosus — Wermuth & Mertens, 1961; Phrynops (Phrynops) tuberosus — Freiberg, 1981; Phrynops geoffroanus tuberculosa [sic] Miyata, 1982 (ex errore); Phrynops tuberosus — TTWG, 2021

= Phrynops tuberosus =

Species of turtle

Phrynops tuberosus, commonly known as the Cotinga River toadhead turtle, is a large species of side-necked turtle in the family Chelidae. The species is endemic to South America.

== Taxonomy ==
In the past, Phrynops tuberosus has been considered a subspecies of Phrynops geoffroanus, but since 2021 it is afforded full species status.
