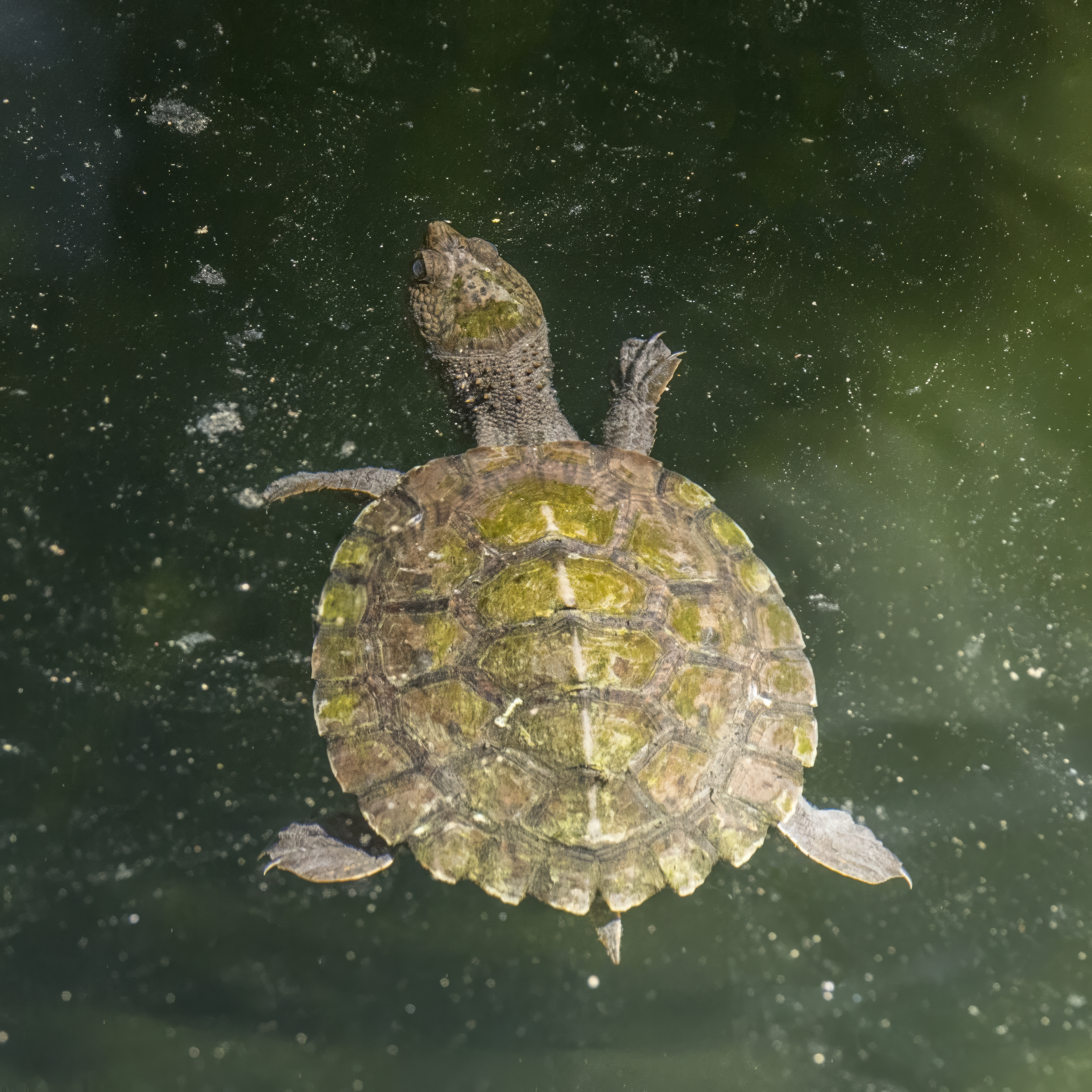
- Daintree rainforest, Queensland

Scientific classification
- Kingdom: Animalia
- Phylum: Chordata
- Class: Reptilia
- Order: Testudines
- Suborder: Pleurodira
- Family: Chelidae
- Genus: Myuchelys
- Species: M. latisternum

Binomial name
- Myuchelys latisternum (Gray, 1867)

Synonyms
- Elseya latisternum Gray, 1867; Euchelymys spinosa Gray, 1871; Elseya latisternon Gray, 1871 (ex errore); Elseya spinosa Gray, 1872; Emydura latisternum Boulenger, 1889; Elseya latisternum latisternum Blackmore, 1969

= Saw-shelled turtle =

Species of turtle

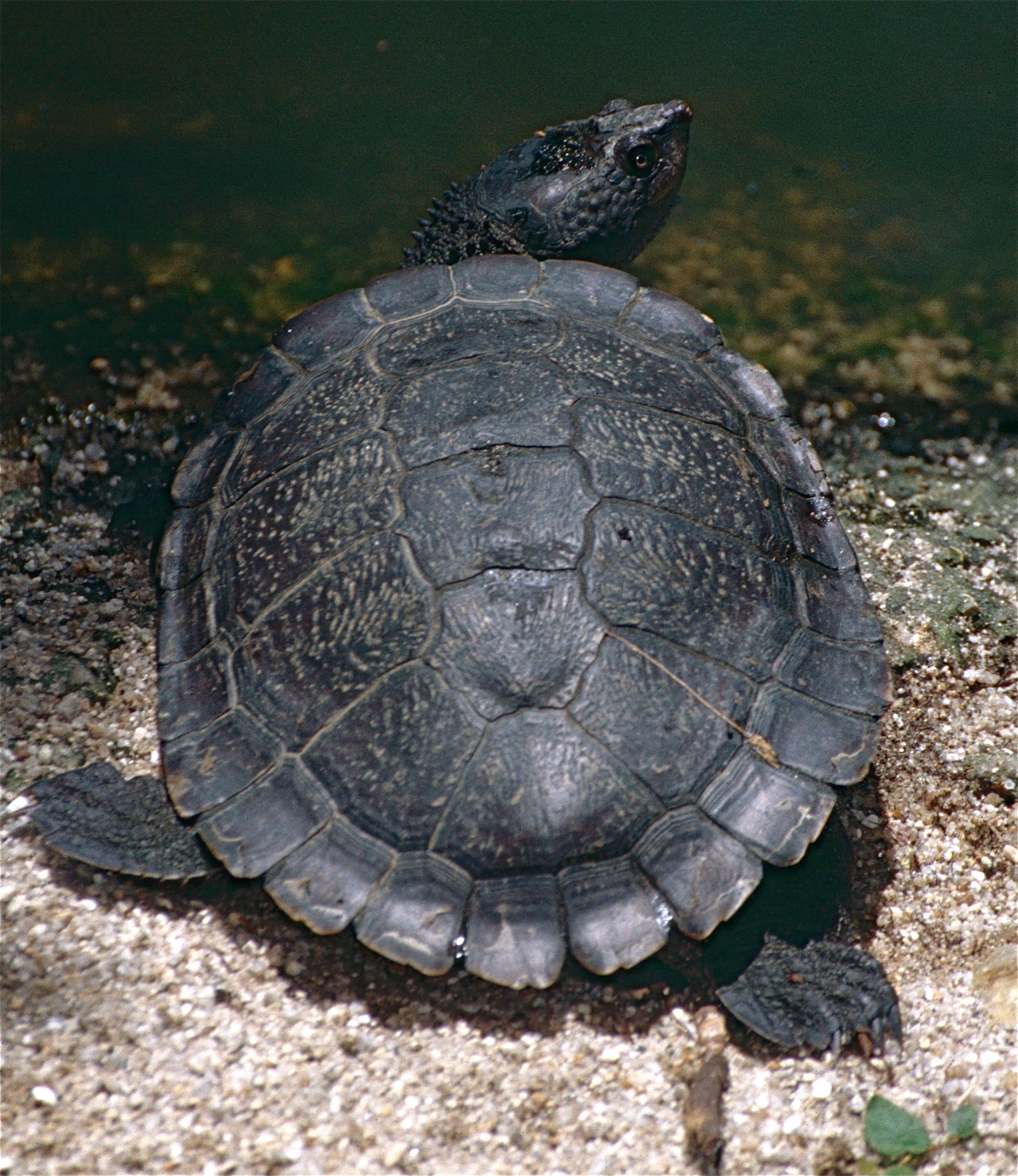
Port Douglas, Australia

The saw-shelled turtle (Myuchelys latisternum) is a species of turtle in the Chelidae family endemic to Australia, ranging along rivers and streams and connected swamps and lagoons from coastal Cape York Peninsula to northern New South Wales, with populations also noted as far south as Newcastle - (Williams River Catchment site of the former Tilligra Dam). They are thought to have been introduced to Lake Eacham in the Atherton Tablelands. Other common English names are: serrated snapping turtle or common sawshell turtle.

== Description ==
The female is considerably larger than the male, with a carapace up to 28 cm long compared to the males which rarely get longer than about 18 cm. The carapace is roughly oval and broad at the rear. They are not usually aggressive, but can bite fiercely. They can also emit a strong smell.

The shell has marginal serrations which are the reason for its common name. It retains some of these serrations throughout its life. "The head shield extends down the side of the head to just above the tympanum, and the top of the neck has prominent pointed tubercules (many of these with an apical sensory pit)."

The carapace is mainly brown to dark brown, commonly with some dark blotches. The plastron (underside) is yellowish. The head is large with a projecting snout and a horny plate on the top. The neck can fold sideways. The feet are webbed and also clawed. Hatchlings have serrated hind legs which become smooth as they mature.

== Nomenclatural history ==
Myuchelys latisternum (Gray, 1867) (common sawshell turtle)

- 1867 Elseya latisternum Gray, 1867, holotype, BMNH 1947.3.4.13, from North Australia.
- 1871 Euchelymys spinosa Gray, 1871, holotype, BMNH 1946.1.22.77, from North Australia. Synonymy

follows that of Gray (1872a) and Boulenger (1889).

- 2009 Myuchelys latisternum — Thomson & Georges, 2009 First use of combination.

The combination Wollumbinia latisternum (Gray, 1867) Wells, 2007, was declared unpublished and hence unavailable for use by Fritz & Havaš 2007.

== Reproduction and nesting ==
Myuchelys latisternum reaches sexual maturity at an SCL of 125–135 mm in males and 182–189 mm in females. Courtship behaviors continue throughout the year but mating is observed during mid January. There is no indication of large congregates of nesting sites, but instead, they are seen in ones or twos at dispersed localities along the watercourse. Nest have been seen in soil as far as 100 m from the water. The females nest from September to December. They can have three to four clutches in one season of 9 to 20 eggs which hatch before winter in about 60 days, with the incubation period shortened in southern regions. The eggs are variably described as either "hard-shelled (34 × 22 mm)", or as small and "flexible-shelled". Hatchlings from central Queensland measured 30 x 29 mm SCL x carapace width, while hatchlings from northern New South Wales averaged 32.5 × 22.5 mm.

== Feeding habits ==
The saw-shelled turtle is an opportunistic omnivore with a carnivorous preference. It feeds on fish, tadpoles, frogs, bivalves, crustaceans, snails, carrion, and aquatic and terrestrial insects. It is also one of the few native Australian animals successful in preying on the introduced and very poisonous cane toad (Rhinella marina) which is lethal to many freshwater turtles. Toads too large to swallow whole are first shredded with their front claws. They also eat vegetation including fruits, leaves, filamentous algae, and water weed.

== Behaviour ==
Like many other aquatic turtles, the saw-shelled turtle is able to obtain oxygen from water through skin, cloaca, and buccopharyngeal cavity, thus extending its ability to stay under water for prolonged periods.

== Habitat and ecology ==
Myuchelys latisternum is most often located in headwaters or tributaries of larger rivers in creeks, waterholes, dams, and lakes. However they are a highly adaptable species and have been seen in a variety of landscapes such as savannah woodlands, tropical rainforest, farmland, and semi-urban environments. Can be observed on logs and rocks adjacent to their habitat for basking, it is unknown if this is for thermoregulatory purposes or not.
