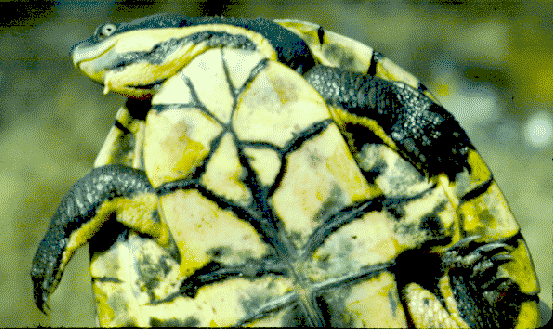
- Myuchelys

Scientific classification
- Kingdom: Animalia
- Phylum: Chordata
- Class: Reptilia
- Order: Testudines
- Suborder: Pleurodira
- Family: Chelidae
- Subfamily: Chelodininae
- Genus: Myuchelys; Thomson and Georges, 2009

Synonyms
- Flaviemys Le, Reid, McCord, Naro-Maciel, Raxworthy, Amato, and Georges, 2013:257

= Myuchelys =

Genus of turtles

The Myuchelys is a genus of turtles, the Australian saw-shelled turtles, in the family Chelidae and subfamily Chelodininae. They inhabit the headwaters and tributaries of rivers within their range and this led to the name Myuchelys, which is formed from the Aboriginal word myuna meaning clear water and the Greek chelys meaning turtle. They have a short neck and the intergular scute completely separates the gular scutes. They have no alveolar ridge separating them from the snapping turtles of the genus Elseya.

== Species ==
The genus currently contains these cryptic small species of freshwater turtles, endemic to eastern and northern Australia:

- Myuchelys bellii, Namoi River snapping turtle Gray, 1844
- Myuchelys georgesi, Bellinger River snapping turtle Cann, 1997
- Myuchelys latisternum, saw-shelled turtle Gray, 1867
- Myuchelys purvisi, Manning River snapping turtle

== Taxonomic history ==
The species Myuchelys latisternum was originally placed in the genus Elseya by Gray in 1867 but Elseya was redefined by George Albert Boulenger in 1889 to include species defined by the presence of an alveolar ridge. Hence, Myuchelys latisternum and Myuchelys novaeguineae were moved to the genus Emydura. In 1967, the two species were placed back in the genus Elseya by J. Goode, where they remained until recently.

During the time, the species Myuchelys bellii was basically lost to knowledge, having been misidentified as a South American species when described by Gray in 1844, and was in the genus Phrynops until this oversight was corrected by Cann in 1998. The species Myuchelys georgesi and Myuchelys purvisi were initially placed in the genus Elseya, but were identified as belonging to a unique clade along with Myuchelys latisternum and Myuchelys bellii using electrophoresis.

The first attempt to separate this group into its own genus was the genus Euchelymys (Gray, 1871), but this name was subsequently synonymised with Elseya by Boulenger (1889) and the name was made permanently unavailable when Lindholm (1929) set Euchelymys sulcifera (= Emydura macquarii) as the type species, effectively making the name Euchelymys a junior synonym of Emydura.

Another option investigated was the fossil form Pelocomastes, de Vis 1897; the species in this genus may have represented an extinct member of the latisternum group, but this was determined to be incorrect and the name Pelocomastes is now considered a junior synonym of Elseya.

The genus name Wollumbinia was erected by Wells, 2007, this paper was pointed out by Georges and Thomson to be in breach of the ICZN code defining a valid publication, ICZN Articles 8 and 9 and Recommendation 8D. As such this name is not considered valid. The genus encompassing these species was named Myuchelys by Thomson and Georges, 2009. Currently, this arrangement is considered the accepted name for the latisternum group by the IUCN, a single taxonomic checklist and by numerous workers in diverse disciplines. In the ensuing time the name Myuchelys has established usage as defined by the ICZN code.

In 2013, Le et al. found that one species, purvisi, was still paraphyletic and proposed a new monophyletic genus to handle this; purvisi was therefore moved to the genus Flaviemys. In 2017, the IUCN TTWG following the recommendation of Spinks et al. (2015) placed Flaviemys as a synonymy of Myuchelys.
