= Mendozachelys =

Mendozachelys Temporal range: Late Cretaceous

Scientific classification
- Kingdom: Animalia
- Phylum: Chordata
- Class: Reptilia
- Order: Testudines
- Suborder: Pleurodira
- Family: Chelidae
- Genus: †Mendozachelys
- Species: †M. wichmanni

Binomial name
- †Mendozachelys wichmanni De la Fuente et al., 2017

Extinct genus of turtles

Mendozachelys is an extinct genus of panchelid turtle that inhabited Argentina during the Late Cretaceous.
