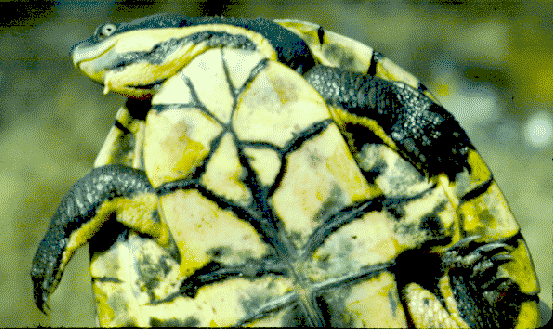

Conservation status
- Data Deficient (IUCN 2.3)

Scientific classification
- Kingdom: Animalia
- Phylum: Chordata
- Class: Reptilia
- Order: Testudines
- Suborder: Pleurodira
- Family: Chelidae
- Subfamily: Chelodininae
- Genus: Myuchelys; Le, Reid, McCord, Naro-Maciel, Raxworthy, Amato and Georges, 2013
- Species: M. purvisi

Binomial name
- Myuchelys purvisi (Wells & Wellington, 1985)

Synonyms
- Elseya purvisi Wells & Wellington, 1985; Elseya purvesi Georges & Thomson, 2006 (ex errore); Flaviemys purvisi

= Manning River snapping turtle =

Species of turtle

The Manning River snapping turtle (Myuchelys purvisi), or Manning River saw-shelled turtle, is a species of turtle in the family Chelidae, endemic to Australia.
