= Phrynops paranaensis =

Phrynops paranaensis Temporal range: late Miocene

Scientific classification
- Kingdom: Animalia
- Phylum: Chordata
- Class: Reptilia
- Order: Testudines
- Suborder: Pleurodira
- Family: Chelidae
- Genus: Phrynops
- Species: P. paranaensis

Binomial name
- Phrynops paranaensis (Wieland, 1923)

Synonyms
- Parahydraspis paranaensis Wieland 1923

Extinct species of turtle

Phrynops paranaensis is an extinct species of turtle in the family Chelidae. This fossil species is from the Huayquerian Ituzaingó Formation of the Paraná Basin, Argentina, likely to be late Miocene in origin.
