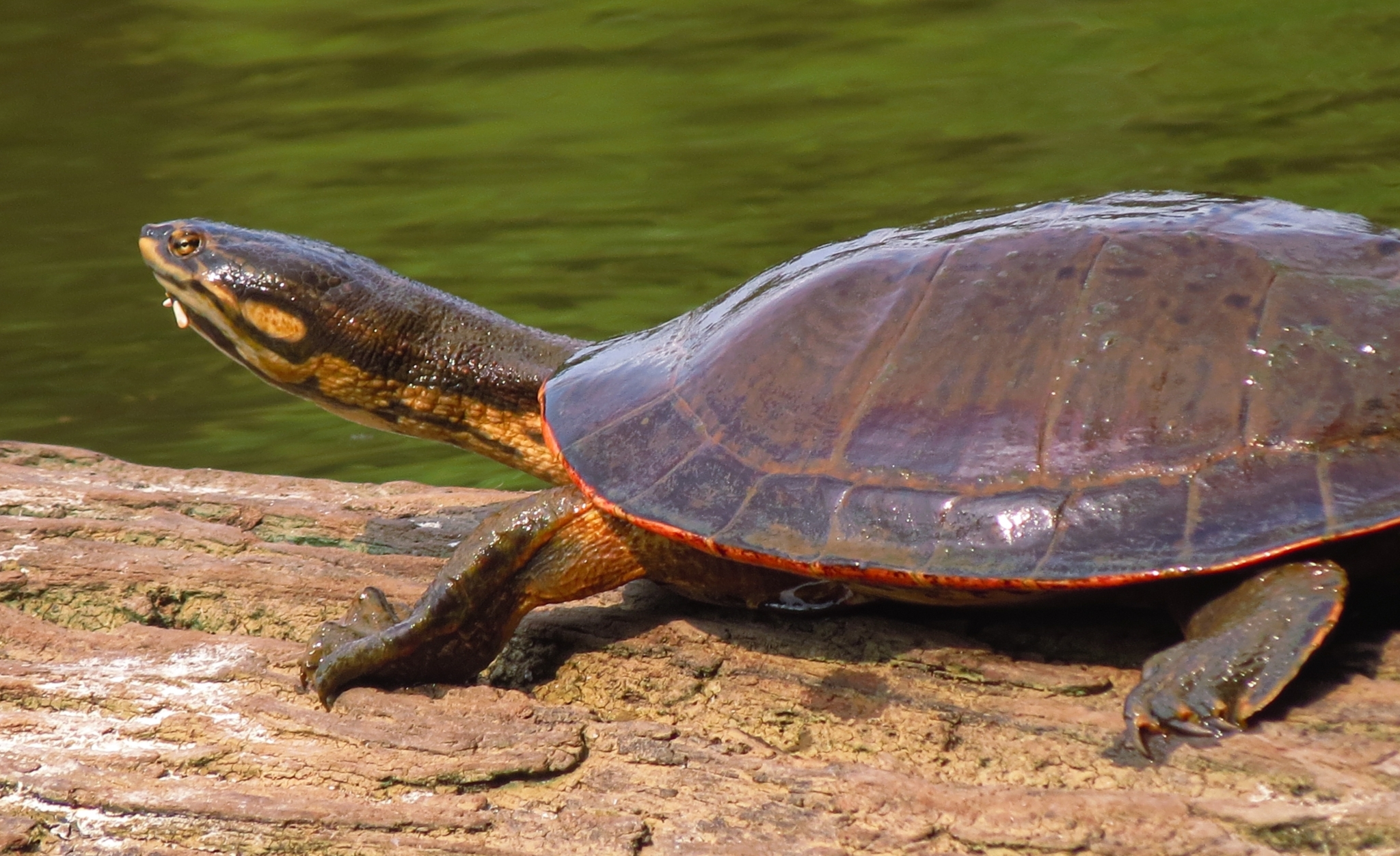
- In Brazil
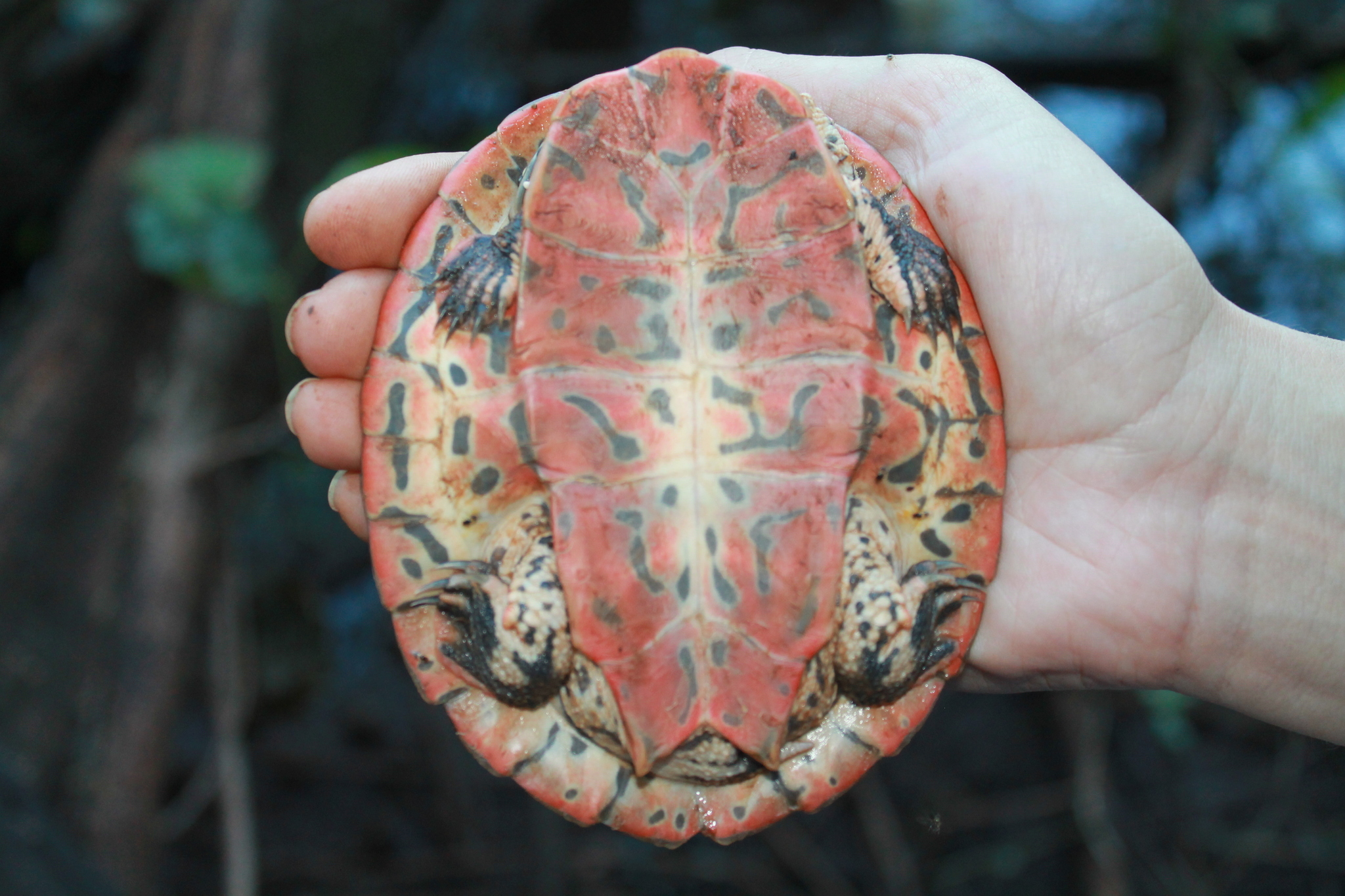
- Plastron, Brazil

Conservation status
- Least Concern (IUCN 2.3)

Scientific classification
- Kingdom: Animalia
- Phylum: Chordata
- Class: Reptilia
- Order: Testudines
- Suborder: Pleurodira
- Family: Chelidae
- Genus: Phrynops
- Species: P. geoffroanus

Binomial name
- Phrynops geoffroanus (Schweigger, 1812)

Synonyms
- Species Synonymy: Emys geoffroana Schweigger, 1812; Emys depressa Merrem, 1820; Emys viridis Spix, 1824; Chelodina geoffroana — Fitzinger, 1826; Phrynops geoffroanus — Wagler, 1830; Chelys (Hydraspis) depressa — Gray, 1831; Chelys (Hydraspis) viridis — Gray, 1831; Emys geoffroyana Gray, 1831 (ex errore); Hydraspis depressa — Gray, 1831; Hydraspis viridis — Gray, 1831; Platemys geoffroana — Wagler, 1833; Platemys geoffreana A.M.C. Duméril & Bibron, 1835 (ex errore); Platemys neuwiedii A.M.C. Duméril & Bibron, 1835; Platemys waglerii A.M.C. Duméril & Bibron, 1835; Hydraspis (Phrynops) geoffroana — Fitzinger, 1835; Phrynops geoffroana — Fitzinger, 1835; Emys geoffroiana Temminck & Schlegel, 1835 (ex errore); Hydraspis wagleri — Gray, 1844 (ex errore); Phrynops geoffroyana — Gray, 1844; Hydraspis geoffroyana — Gray, 1856; Platemys depressa — Strauch, 1862; Platemys geoffreyana Hensel, 1868 (ex errore); Platemys geoffroyana — Hensel, 1868; Platemys wagleri — Boulenger, 1889; Rhinemys geoffroana — Baur, 1890; Hydraspis boulengeri Bohls, 1895; Phrynops wagleri — Stejneger, 1909; Hydraspis lutzi Ihering, 1926; Phrynops geoffroana geoffroana — L. Müller, 1939; Phrynops geoffrayana — E. Williams, 1950; Phrynops geoffroanus geoffroanus — Wermuth & Mertens, 1961; Phrynops boulengeri — Pritchard, 1979; Phrynops lutzi — Pritchard, 1979; Phrynops (Phrynops) geoffroannus Seddon, Georges, Baverstock & McCord, 1997 (ex errore); Phrynops geoffranus Ippi & Flores, 2001 (ex errore)

= Phrynops geoffroanus =

Species of turtle

Phrynops geoffroanus, also commonly known as Geoffroy's side-necked turtle and Geoffroy's toadhead turtle, is a species of large side-necked turtle in the family Chelidae. The species is endemic to South America.

== Etymology ==
The specific name, geoffroanus, is in honor of French naturalist Étienne Geoffroy Saint-Hilaire.

== Geographic range ==
P. geoffroanus is found in southwestern Venezuela, southeastern Colombia, eastern Ecuador, and eastern Peru, southward and eastward through southwestern Brazil and northern Bolivia to Paraguay and northeastern Argentina, then northward through eastern Brazil. It also occurs in eastern Venezuela, and in adjacent Guyana.

== Habitat ==
The preferred natural habitat of P. geoffroanus is freshwater rivers.
