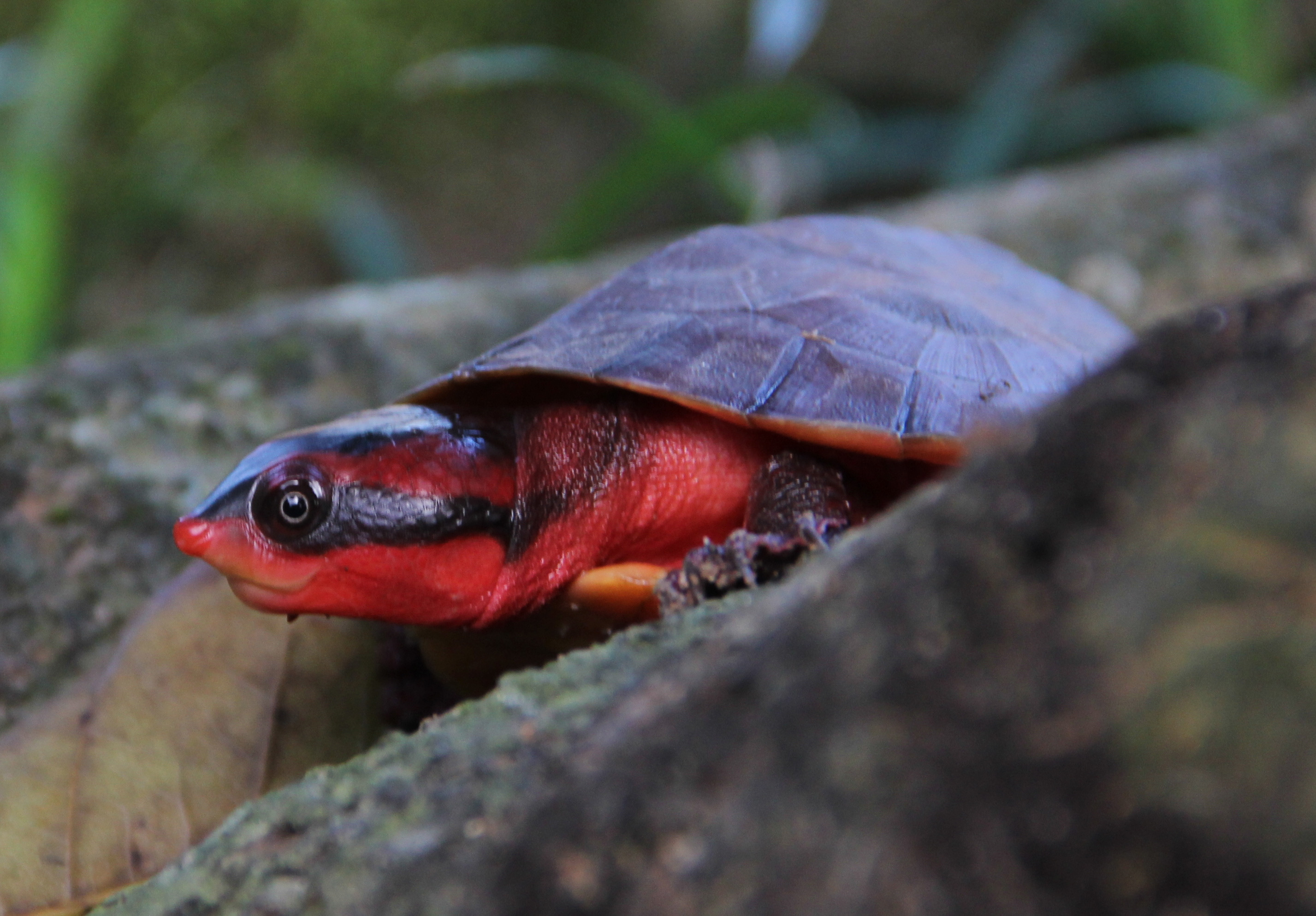

Conservation status
- Near Threatened (IUCN 3.1)

Scientific classification
- Kingdom: Animalia
- Phylum: Chordata
- Class: Reptilia
- Order: Testudines
- Suborder: Pleurodira
- Family: Chelidae
- Subfamily: Chelinae
- Genus: Rhinemys; Wagler, 1830
- Species: R. rufipes

Binomial name
- Rhinemys rufipes (Spix, 1824)
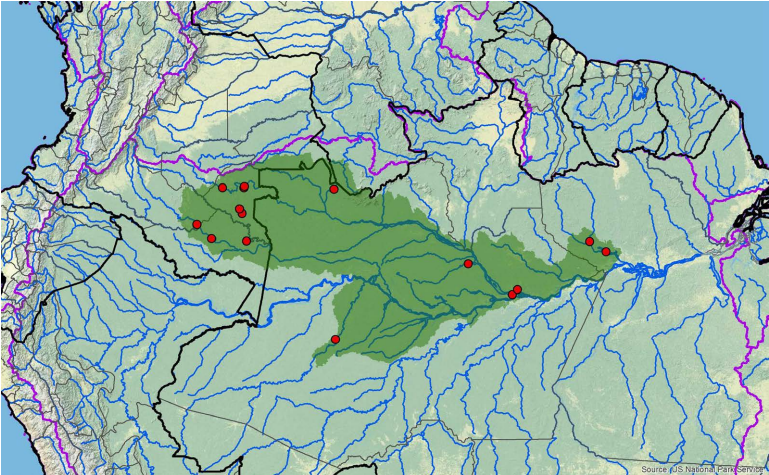
- Range

Synonyms
- Synonymy: Emys rufipes Spix, 1824; Hydraspis rufipes Bell, 1828; Rhinemys rufipes Wagler, 1830; Chelys (Hydraspis) rufipes Gray, 1831; Platemys rufipes Duméril & Bibron, 1835; Phrynops rufipes Gray, 1844; Hydraspis rufipes Boulenger, 1889; Rhinemys rufipes Baur, 1893

= Red side-necked turtle =

Species of turtle

The red side-necked turtle (Rhinemys rufipes), red turtle, red-footed sideneck turtle, William's toadhead turtle, or red-footed Amazon side-necked turtle is a monotypic species of turtle in the family Chelidae. It is found in Brazil, Colombia, and possibly Peru.

== Description ==
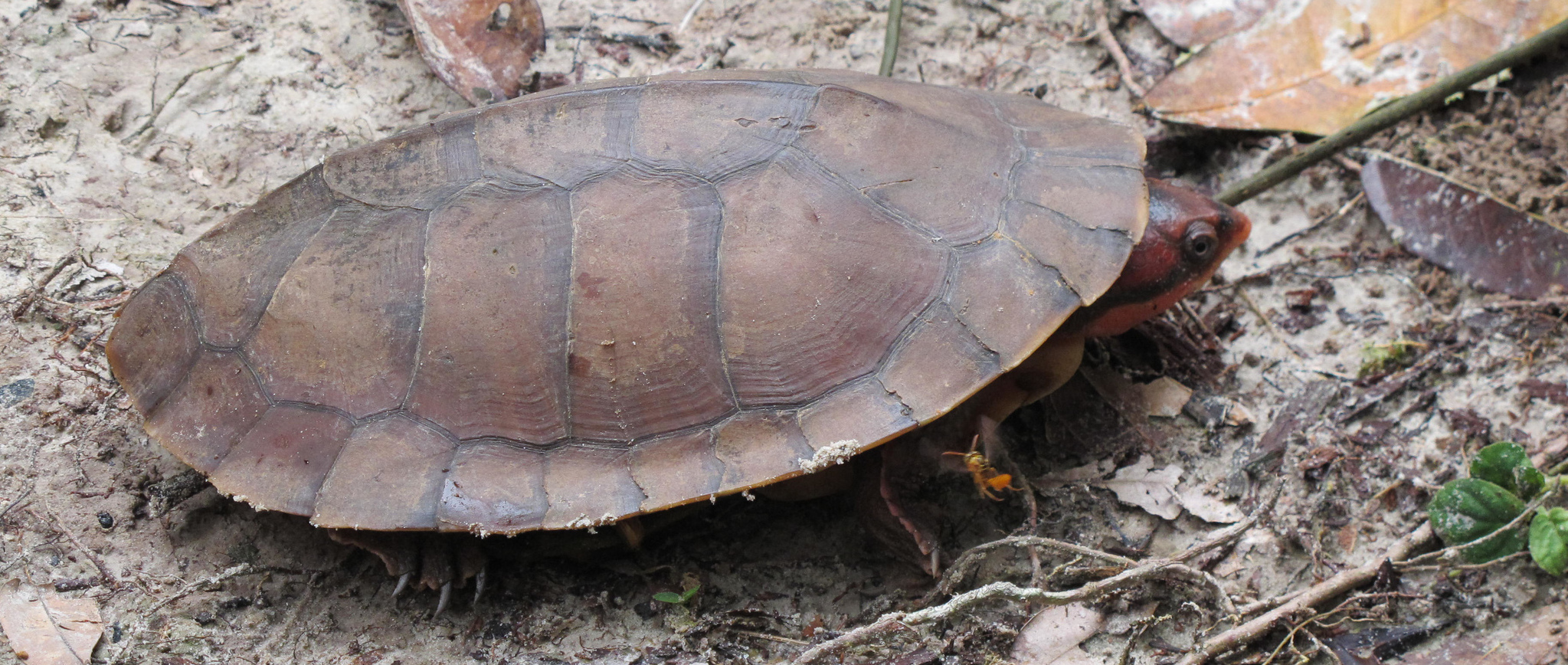
In Brazil

This species is dimorphic in size meaning the sexes show different characteristics. One study found that the largest female out of a group of 24 was 256 mm in carapace length. Out of that same group, the largest male was only 199 mm in carapace length. A study focused on determining how these turtles acquire their sex discovered that it is not environmentally determined rather, it is a genetic sex determination.

== Gallery ==
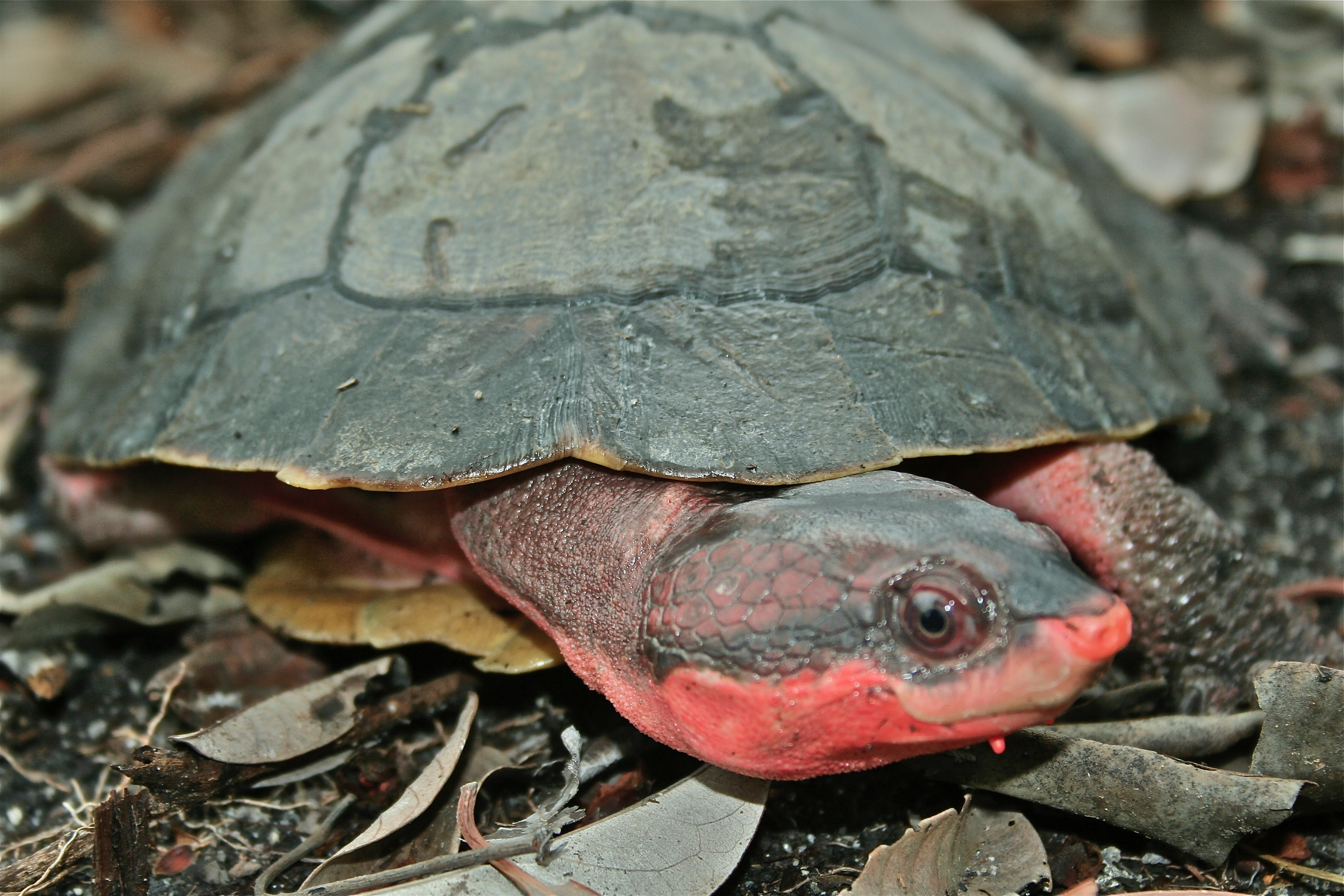

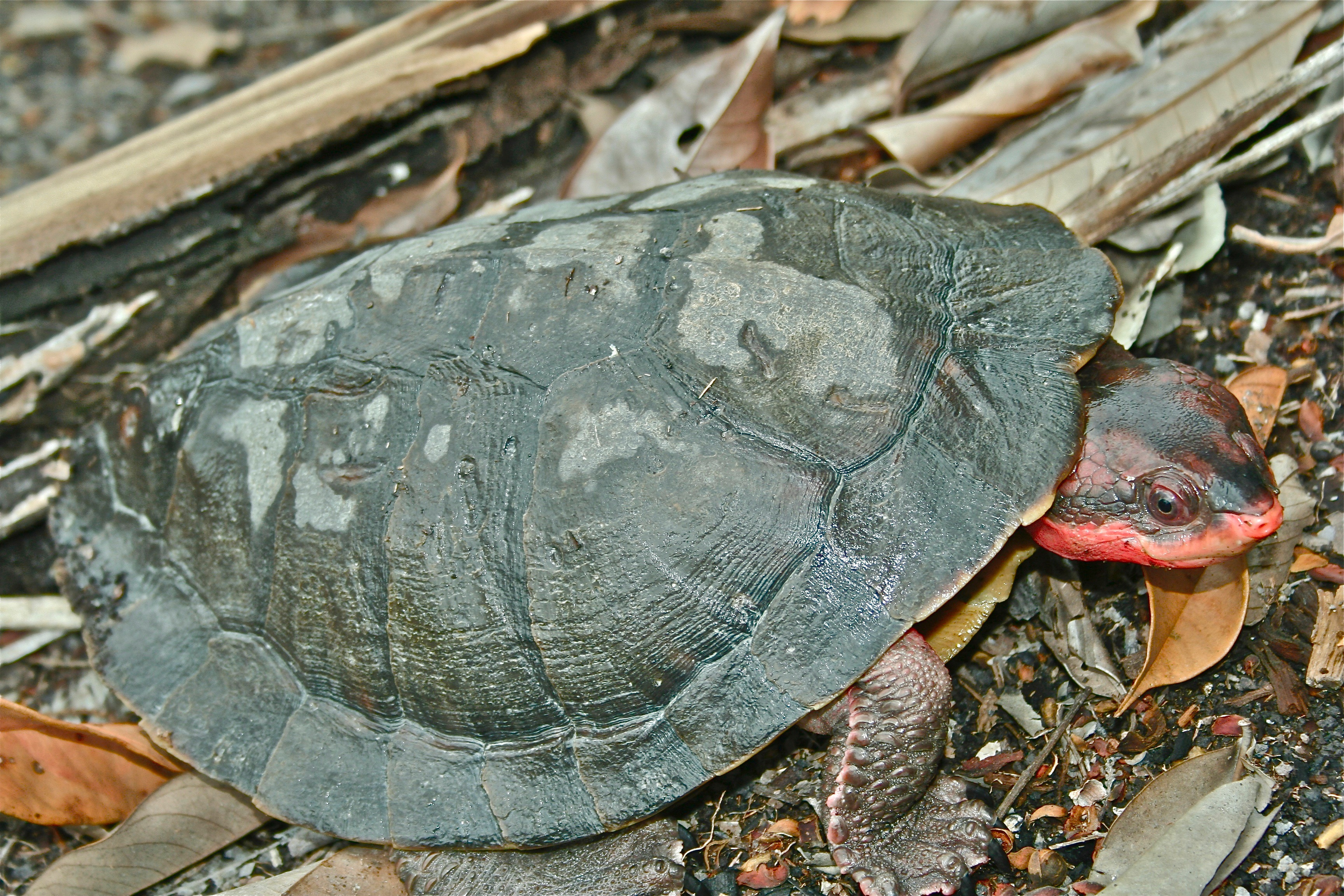

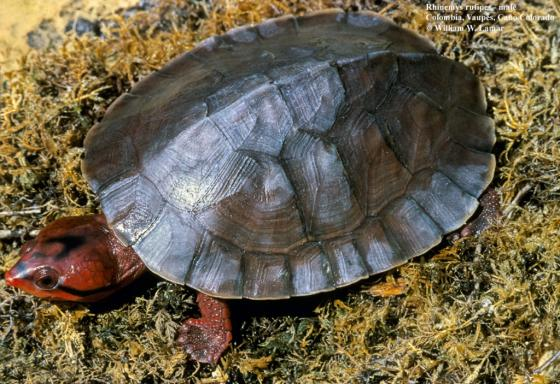

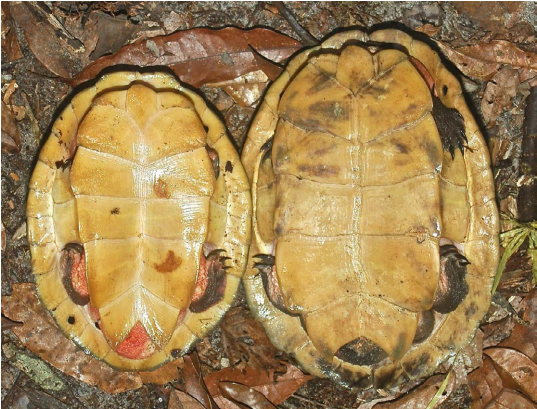
Male (left), female (right).
