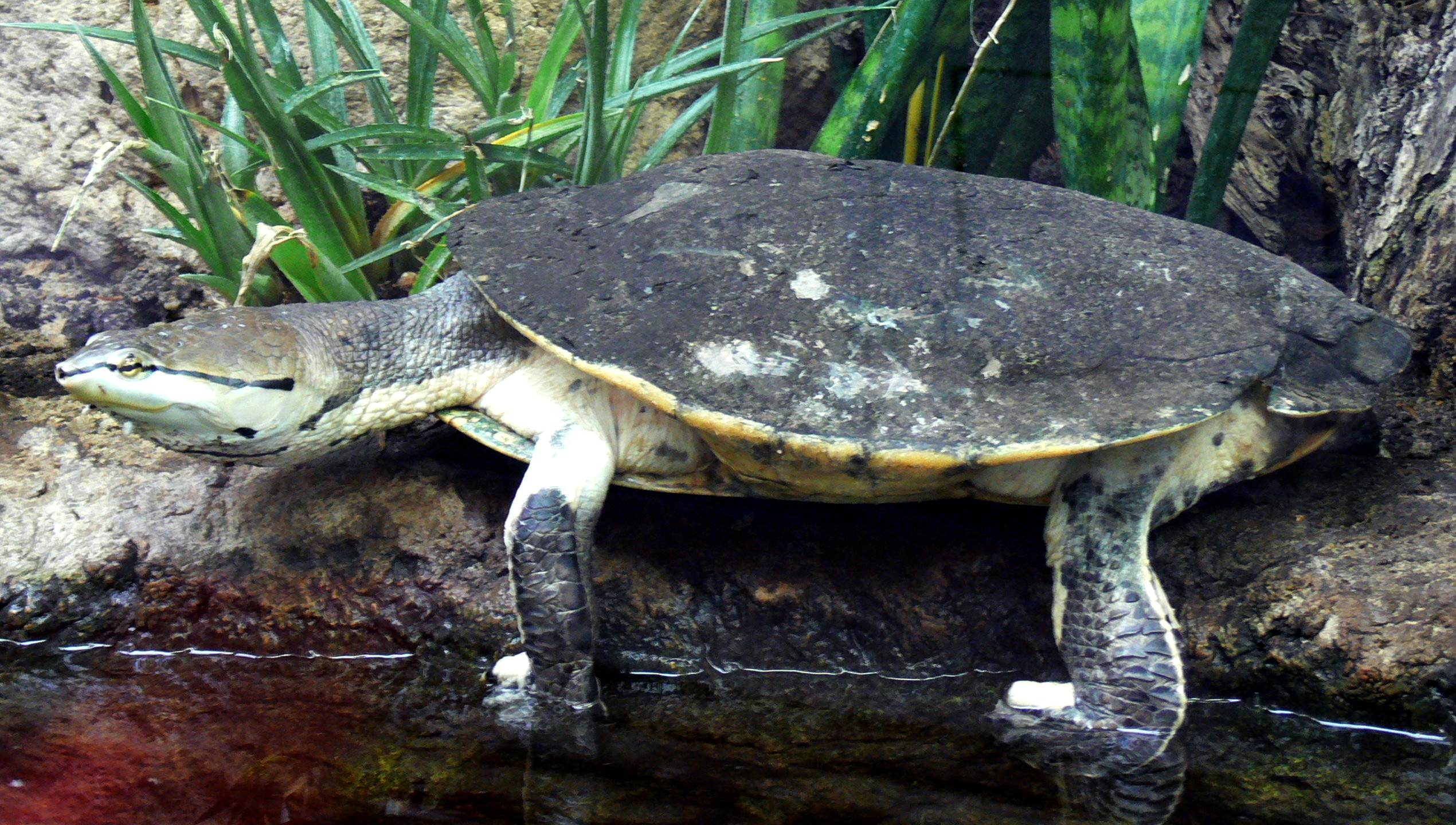
- Phrynops hilarii

Scientific classification
- Kingdom: Animalia
- Phylum: Chordata
- Class: Reptilia
- Order: Testudines
- Suborder: Pleurodira
- Family: Chelidae
- Subfamily: Chelinae
- Genus: Phrynops; Wagler 1830

Synonyms
- Spatulemys Gray 1872; Parahydraspis Wieland 1923

= Phrynops =

Genus of turtles

Phrynops is a genus of sidenecked turtles of the family Chelidae. Sometimes called the bearded toadheads, this genus inhabits waterways of South America, where it is widely distributed: they are found in the Orinoco to Amazon basin and São Francisco to Paraná and adjacent river basins of Colombia, Venezuela, the Guianas, Brazil, Paraguay, Uruguay and northeastern Argentina (Iverson, 1992).

Phrynops turtles generally achieve thermoregulation through areal basking. In order to best attain its goal, it tends to increase its basking time during mid-day during the winters to make up for the cold. Other factors such as food intake and reproduction underwater also influence the way it controls the temperature of its body. Although this is the main way it is able to maintain body temperature, food intake and reproduction rates are also influential in the matter.

== Species ==
Listed alphabetically by specific name.

- Phrynops geoffroanus (Schweigger, 1812) – Geoffroy's toadhead turtle, Geoffroy's side-necked turtle
- Phrynops hilarii (A.M.C. Duméril & Bibron, 1835) – Hilaire's toadhead turtle, Hilaire's side-necked turtle
- Phrynops tuberosus (W. Peters, 1870) – Cotinga River toadhead turtle
- Phrynops williamsi Rhodin & Mittermeier, 1983 – William's toadhead turtle, William's South American side-necked turtle
- †Phrynops paranaensis (Wieland, 1923)
