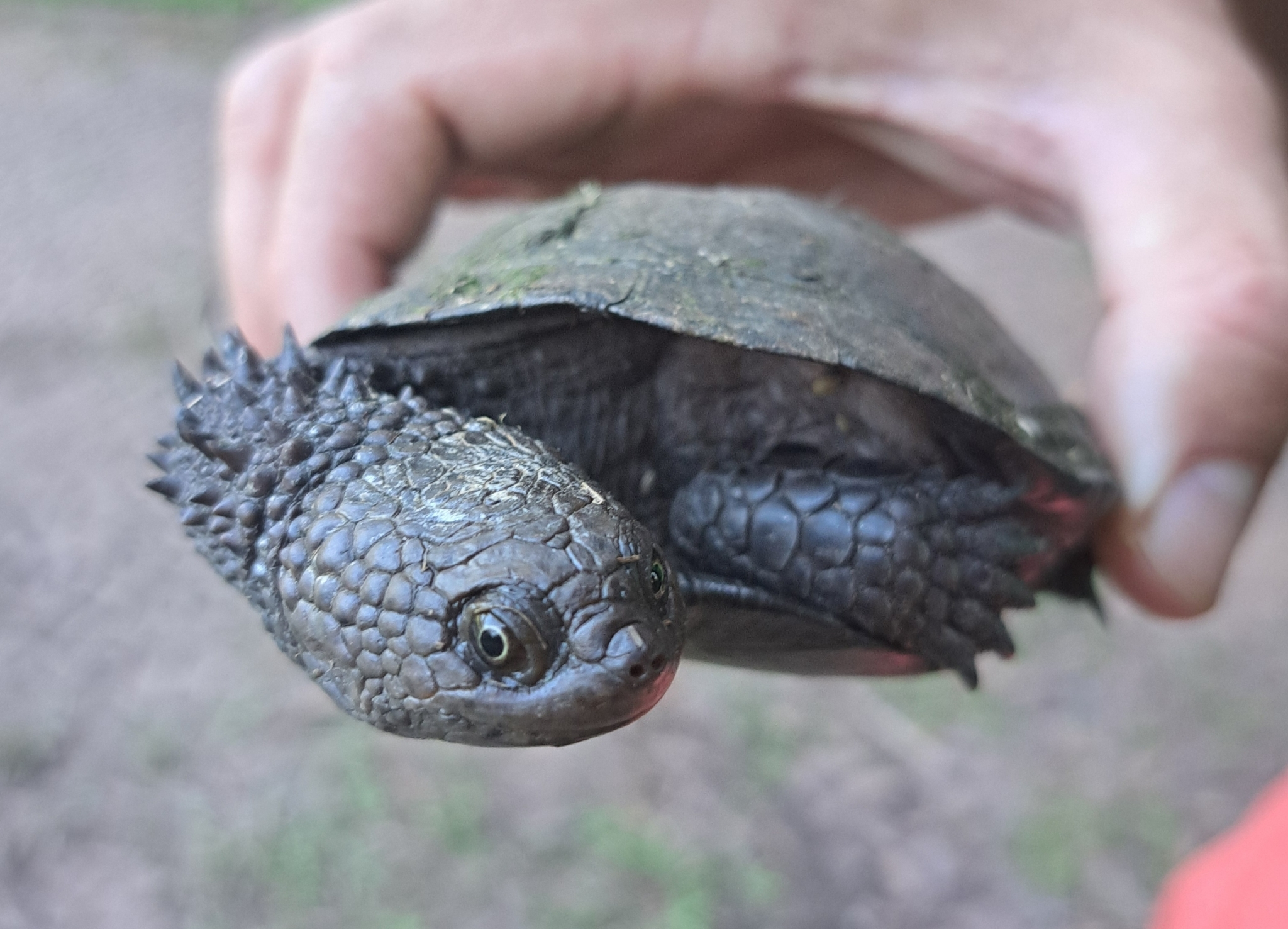
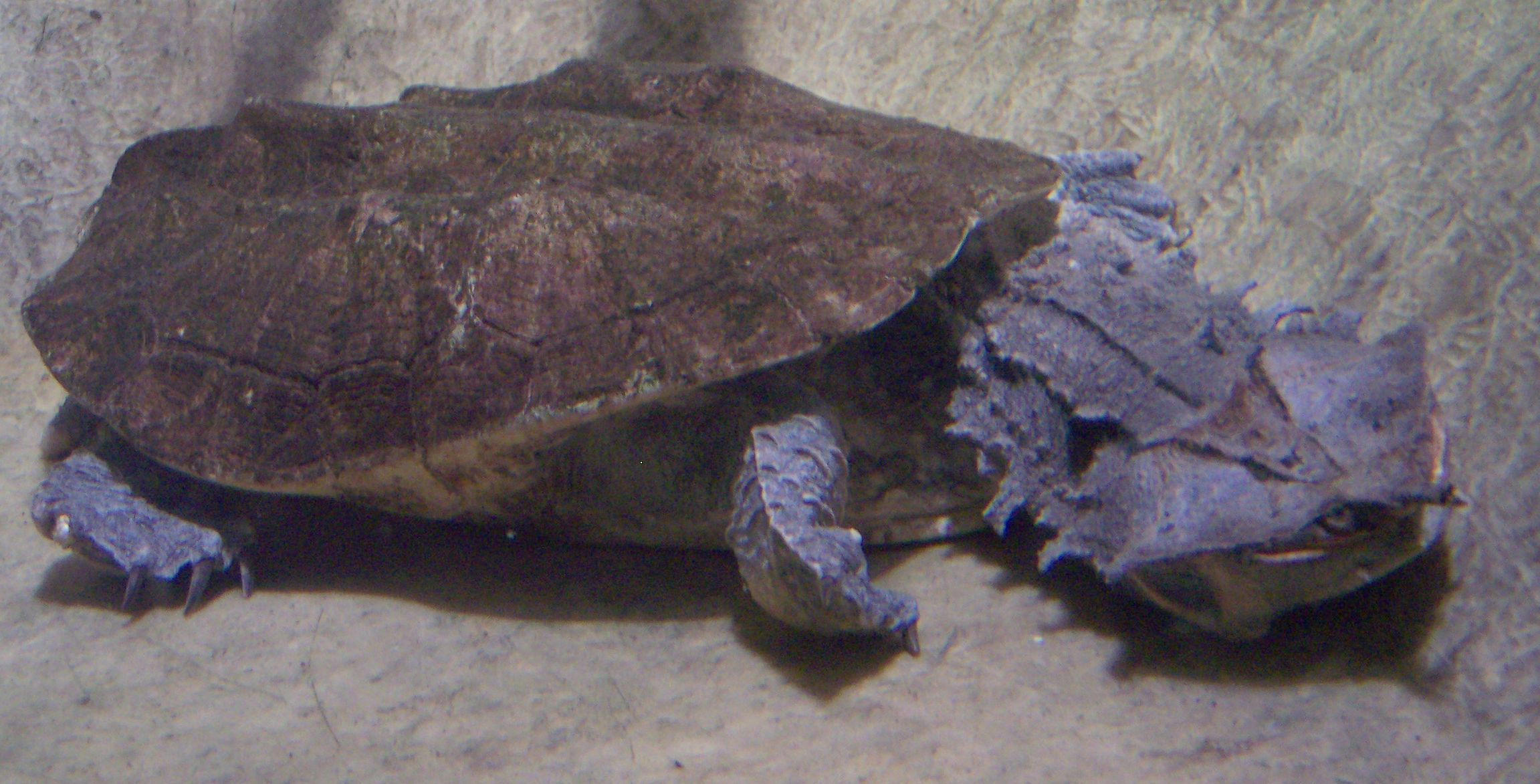
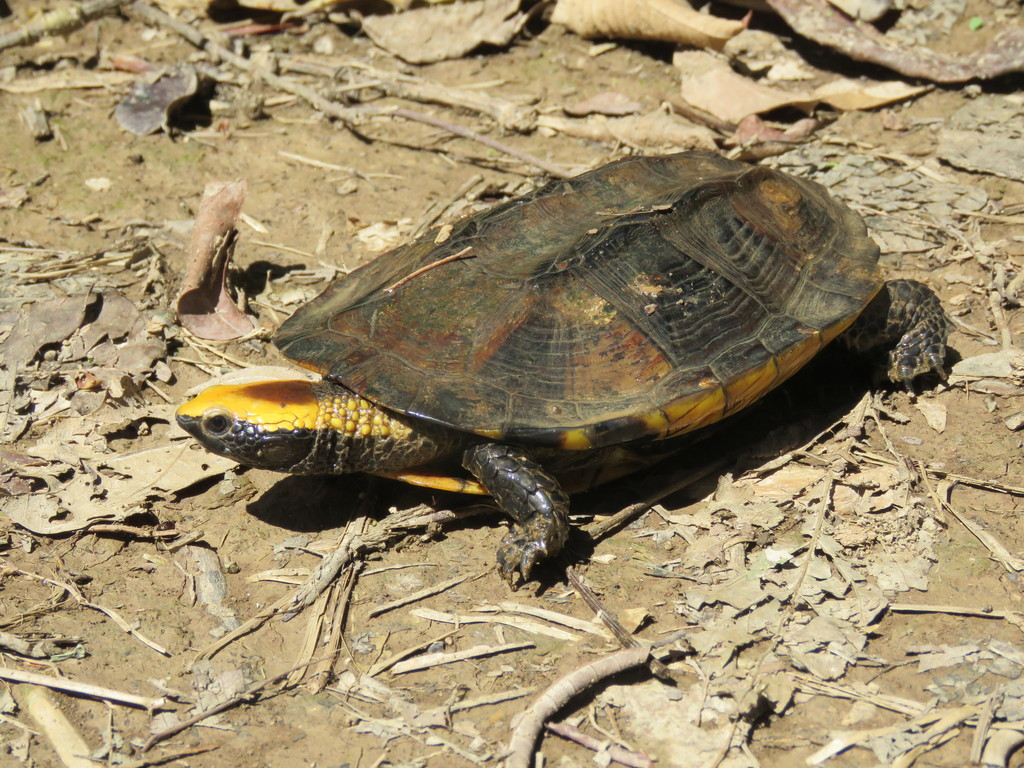
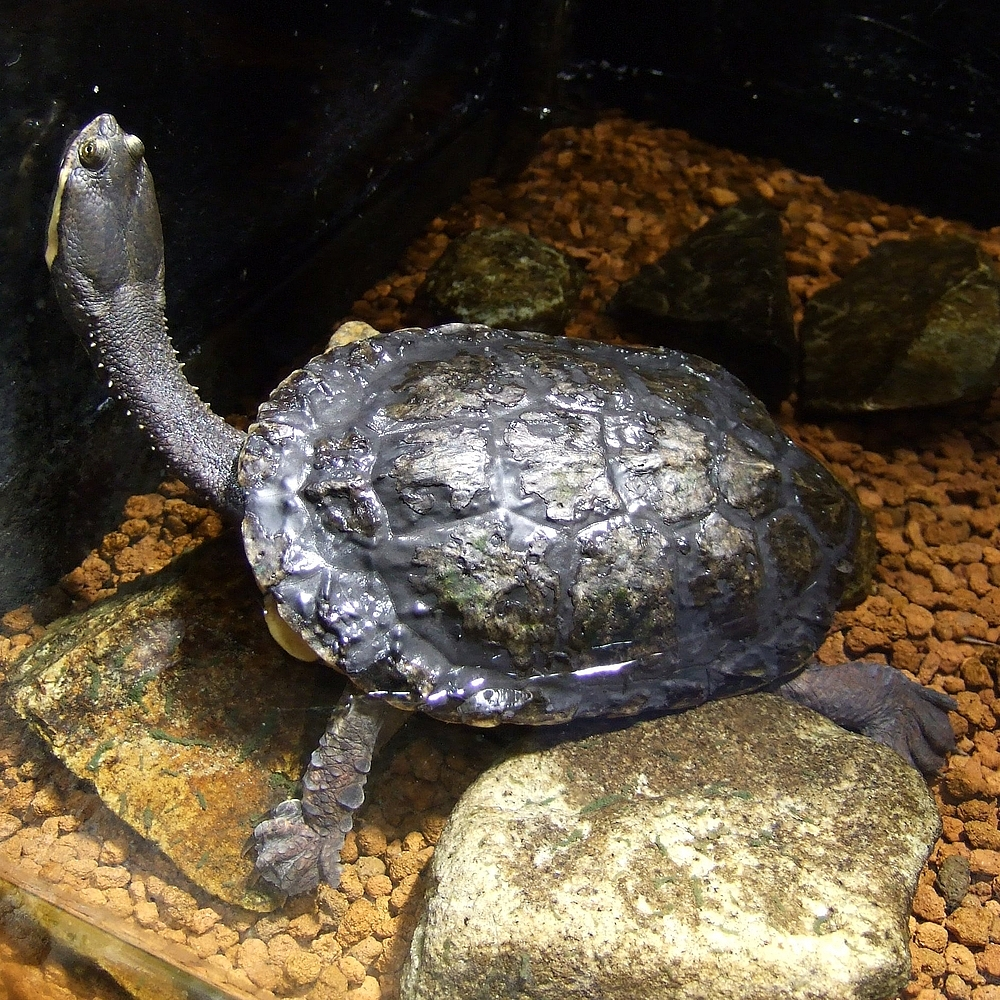
- Spine-necked turtle (Acanthochelys spixii) Type species of the type genus, Amazon mata mata (Chelus fimbriatus) Twist-necked turtle (Platemys platycephala) Snake-necked turtle (Hydromedusa tectifera)

Scientific classification
- Kingdom: Animalia
- Phylum: Chordata
- Class: Reptilia
- Order: Testudines
- Suborder: Pleurodira
- Family: Chelidae; Gray, 1831

Genera
- Around 20., see text

= Chelidae =

Chelidae Temporal range: Albian-Present

Family of turtles

Chelidae is one of three living families of the turtle suborder Pleurodira, and are commonly called Austro-South American side-neck turtles. The family is distributed in Australia, New Guinea, Eastern Indonesia, and throughout most of South America. It is a large family of turtles with a significant fossil history dating back to the Cretaceous. The family is entirely Gondwanan in origin, with no members found outside Gondwana, either in the present day or as a fossil.

== Description ==
Like all pleurodirous turtles, the chelids withdraw their necks sideways into their shells, differing from cryptodires that fold their necks in the vertical plane. They are all highly aquatic species with webbed feet and the capacity to stay submerged for long periods of time. The snake-necked species (genera Chelus, Chelodina, and Hydromedusa) are largely strike-and-gape hunters or foragers feeding on fish and invertebrates. The short-necked forms are largely herbivorous or molluscivorous, but are also opportunistic, with several species having specialized to eating fruits.

The highly aquatic nature of the group is typified by the presence of cloacal breathing in some species of the genera Elseya and Rheodytes. However, some species, such as the Australian eastern long-neck turtle (Chelodina longicollis) spend significant periods of time on land and are considered highly terrestrial.

The smaller members of the family include the Macleay River turtle (Emydura macquarii) at around 16 cm (6.3 in), twist-necked turtle (Platemys platycephala) at 18 cm (7.1 in) and the western swamp turtle (Pseudemydura umbrina) at 15 cm (5.9 in), whereas the larger species such as the mata mata (Chelus fimbriata) and the white-throated snapping turtle (Elseya albagula) both exceed 45 cm (18 in) in shell length.

Chelids exhibit XX/XY genetic sex determination, in contrast to most other turtles, which have temperature-dependent sex determination.

=== Shell morphology ===
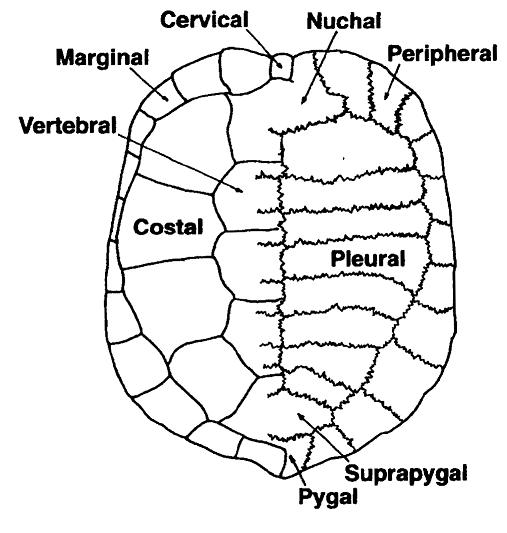
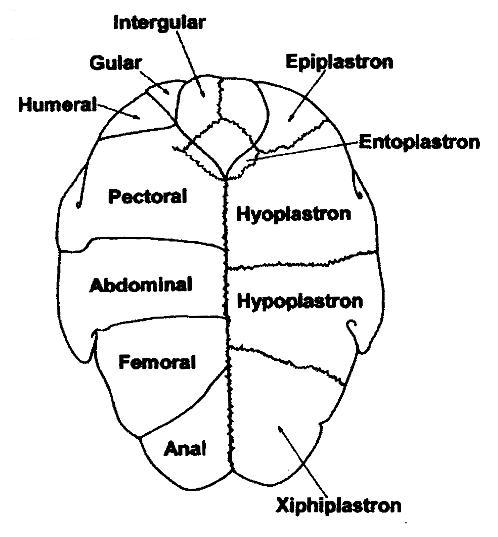
Scute and skeletal elements of the chelid carapace (top) and plastron (bottom)

Chelid turtles have unique shell morphology. The carapace often has reduced surface exposure of neural bones, or even none at all. This is due to less requirement for enlarged longissimus dorsi muscles in side-necked turtles.

The cervical scute is usually present, though it is absent in some species of Elseya and Myuchelys. Otherwise, the carapace has the usual complement of four costals, five vertebrals and twelve marginals (per side). Internally, the carapace is made of eight pleurals (per side), eleven peripherals (per side), a nuchal at the front and a suprapygal and pygal at the rear of the shell. As noted earlier, neurals, although always present, often exist as subsurface elements above the vertebral column.

The inside of the carapace is often heavily buttressed. This has sometimes been seen as a defense mechanism, a reinforcement of the shell against biting force, however Thomson (2003) demonstrated it is linked to feeding methods and the prevention of internal torsion of the shell.

The plastron of chelids does not contain any hinges as can appear in some cryptodire turtles. The scute pattern is a unique feature of Pleurodira and can be used to immediately identify a shell as belonging to this suborder. All cryptodires have 12 plastral scutes, whereas pleurodires have thirteen. The extra scute is called the intergular. The rest of the scutes and the skeletal structure beneath them are the same as all turtles: paired gulars, humerals, pectorals, abdominals, and anals. The skeletal elements consist of a single entoplastron, as well as paired epiplastra, entoplastra, hyoplastra, hypoplastra and xiphiplastra (Pritchard & Trebbau, 1984). The mesoplastra is absent, which separates them from the Pelomedusidae.

Key to Australasian Chelidae

1 Forelimbs each with five claws; gular scutes separated by the intergular; intergular scute in broad contact with the anterior margin of the plastron 2
– Forelimbs each with four claws; gular scutes in contact; intergular scute not in broad contact with the anterior margin of the plastron Chelodina

2 Intergular scute not in contact with the pectoral scutes 3
– Intergular scute contacts and partly separates the pectoral scutes Pseudemydura

3 Suture between the second and third costal scutes contacting the seventh marginal scute; suture between the third and fourth costal scutes contacting the ninth marginal scute 4
– Suture between the second and third costal scutes contacting the sixth marginal scute; suture between the third and fourth costal scutes contacting the eighth marginal scute Rheodytes

4 Surface of the temporal region covered with distinct regular scales or low tubercles; dorsal surface of the head with a prominent head shield which may be entire or fragmented; cervical scute present or absent 5
– Skin of the temporal region smooth, sometimes broken into regular scales of low relief; dorsal surface of head without a prominent head shield; cervical scute present (except as a rare variant) Emydura

5 Precloacal tail length greater than postcloacal length only in adult males; tail round in cross section; cloacal orifice round; tail always shorter than half of carapace length 6
– Tail distinctive and large; precloacal length greater than postcloacal length at all ages in both sexes; tail laterally compressed; cloacal orifice a longitudinal slit; tail up to 53% of carapace length in adult males Elusor

6 Prominent alveolar ridge on the triturating surfaces of the mouth; cervical scute absent (except as a rare variant); no prominent process of the head shield extending down the parietal ridge toward the tympanum Elseya
–Alveolar ridge absent; cervical scute absent in Australian species (except as a rare variant), present in New Guinea species (except as a rare variant); posterior process of the head shield extends laterally down the parietal ridge toward the tympanum Myuchelys

== Evolution ==
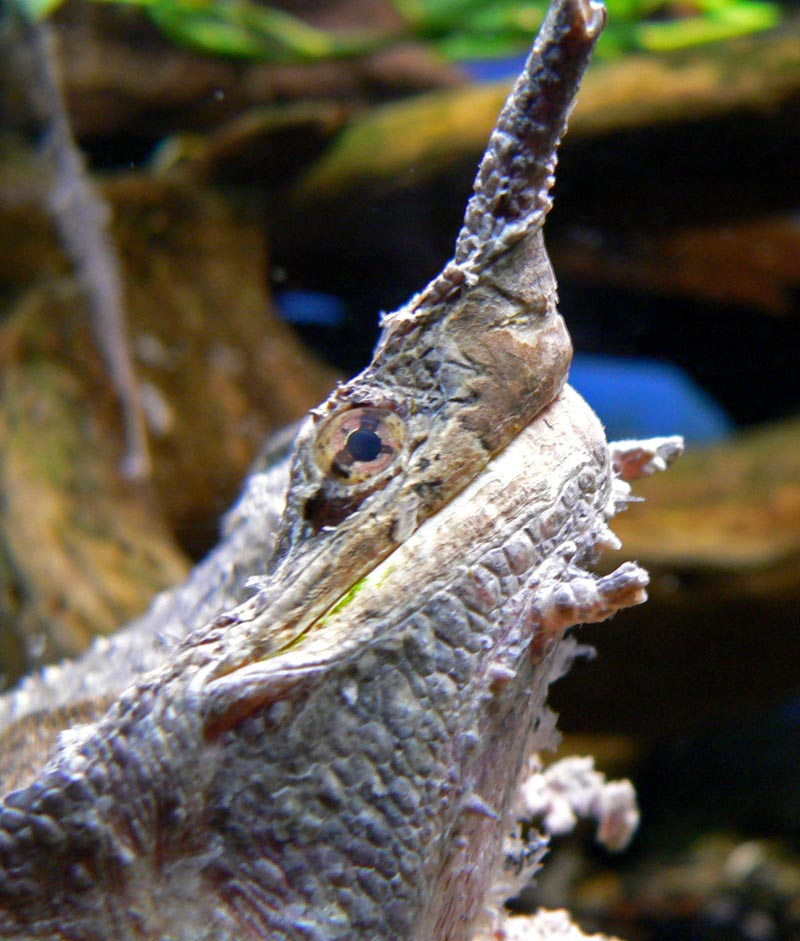
Head of mata mata, Chelus sp.

A number of theories of the relationships within the large chelid family have been posited. Using shared derived characters, an early attempt in the 1970s used strict parsimony to determine the three long-necked genera (Chelodina, Chelus, and Hydromedusa) were each other's closest relatives. This was accepted for some time, but brought into scrutiny, because the major differences between the genera showed they all appeared to have evolved independently of each other, hinging on the fact that although they had long necks, how they used them and their structures were different.

A number of additional data sets were developed that used electrophoresis and nuclear and mtDNA analysis; these all agreed on the independent evolution of the three long-necked clades. This was culminated in a reanalysis of the morphological data which demonstrated the convergence of the clades on a sweep of distinctive features needed for their piscivorous diets, Thomson, 2000. The subfamilies within Chelidae show the monophyly of the majority of the South American species and all the Australian species, with the far more ancient Hydromedusa as sister taxon to both these other groups.

The oldest records of Pan-Chelidae (the clade containing Chelidae and all other species more closely related to Chelidae than other pleurodires) first appear in the mid Cretaceous in South America and Australia, represented by Prochelidella cerrobarcinae from the Cerro Barcino Formation of Argentina, which dates from 118 to 110 million years ago, and indeterminate remains from the Griman Creek Formation, of New South Wales, Australia, dating to around 100 million years ago.

The family Chelidae contains about 60 species within around twenty genera:

Taxonomy after TTWG 2021

- Stem-group taxa
  - Genus †Bonapartemys Lapparent de Broin & de la Fuente, 2001 Bajo Barreal Formation, Argentina, Late Cretaceous (Cenomanian-Turonian)
  - Genus †Calvarichelys Oriozabala 2025 La Colonia Formation, Argentina, Late Cretaceous (Campanian-Maastrichtian)
  - Genus †Linderochelys de la Fuente et al., 2007 Río Neuquén Subgroup, Argentina, Late Cretaceous (Turonian-Coniacian)
  - Genus †Lomalatachelys Lapparent de Broin & de la Fuente 2001 Bajo de la Carpa Formation, Argentina, Late Cretaceous (Santonian)
  - Genus †Palaeophrynops Lapparent de Broin & de la Fuente 2001 Los Alamitos Formation, Argentina, Late Cretaceous (late Campanian -lower Maastrichtian)
  - Genus †Prochelidella Lapparent de Broin & de la Fuente 2001 Cerro Barcino Formation, Argentina, Early Cretaceous (Aptian-Albian) Candeleros Formation, Argentina, Cenomanian Bajo Barreal Formation, Argentina, Cenomanian-Turonian Portezuelo Formation, late Turonian – early Coniacian
  - Genus †Salamanchelys Bona, 2006 Salamanca Formation, Argentina, Paleocene (Danian)
  - Genus †Parahydraspis Wieland 1923 Ituzaingó Formation, Argentina, Miocene (Huayquerian)
  - Family Chelidae Gray, 1831 (Crown group)
    - Subfamily Chelodininae Baur 1893
      - Genus †Birlimarr Megirian & Murray 1999 Camfield Beds, Northern Territory, Australia, Middle Miocene
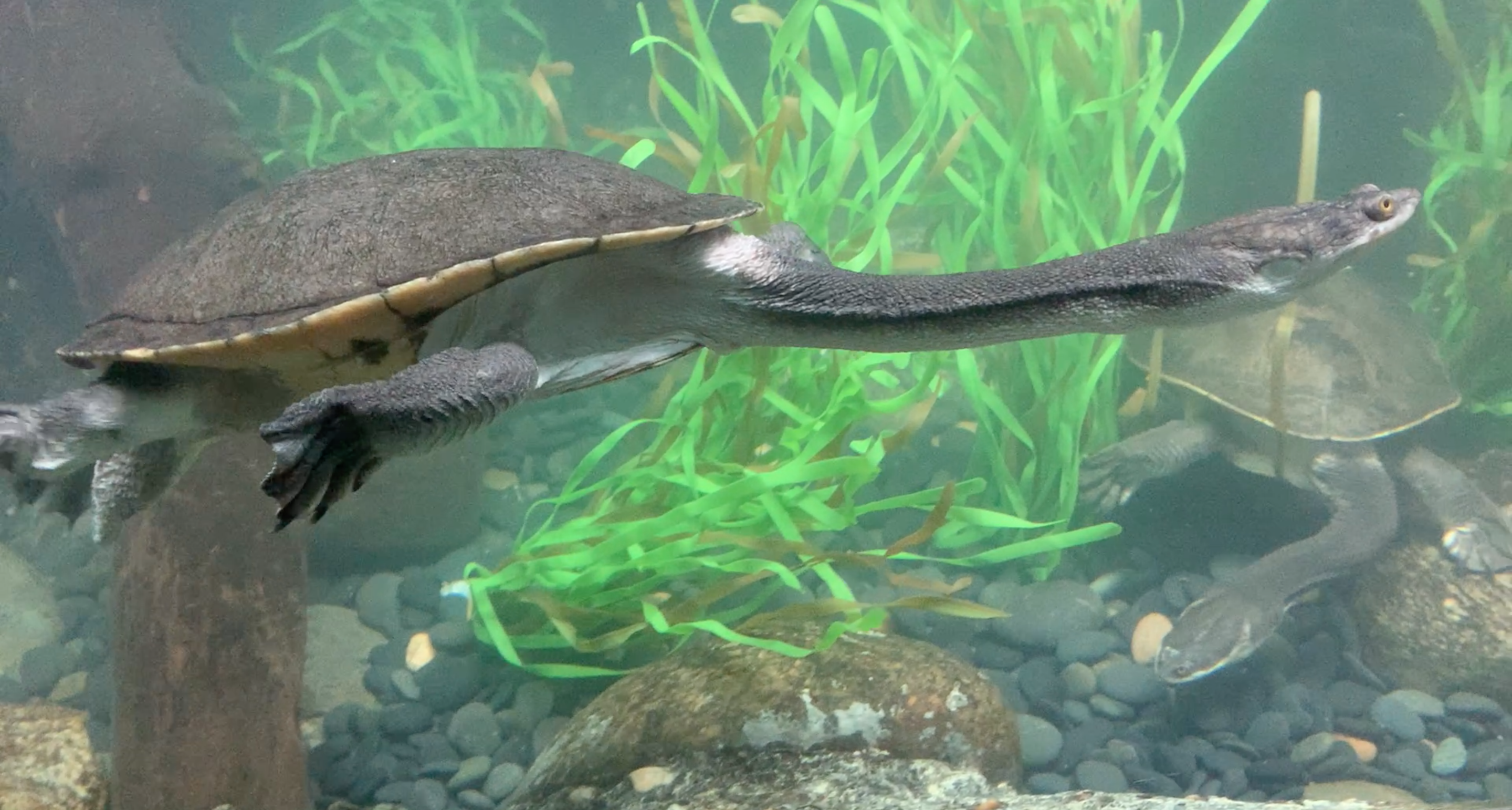
        Chelodina expansa
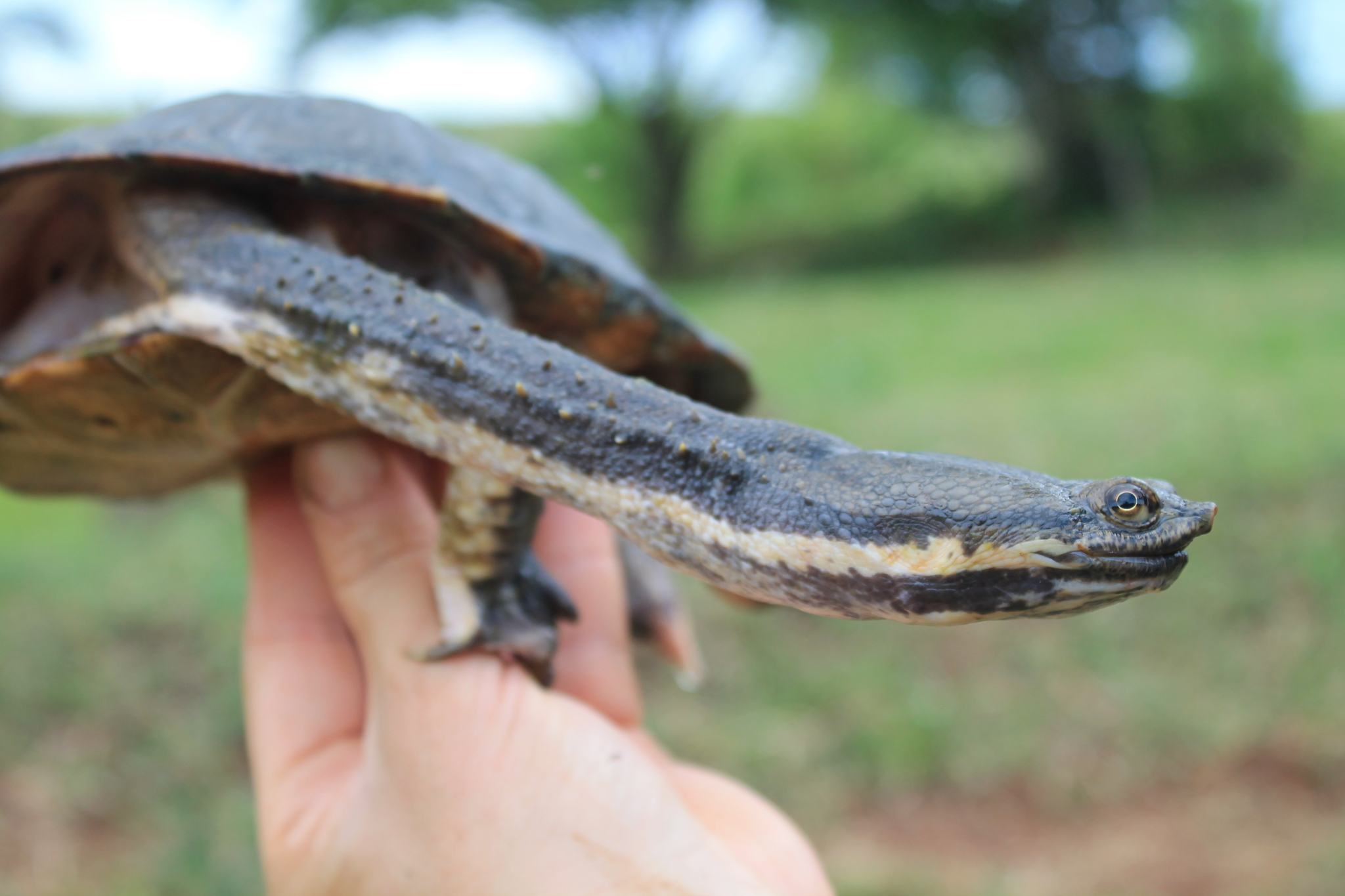
        Hydromedusa tectifera
      - Genus Chelodina Fitzinger 1826 – Australian snake-necked turtles
    - Subfamily EmydurinaeGaffney, 1977
      - Genus Elseya Gray 1867 – Australian snapping turtles
      - Genus Emydura Bonaparte 1836 – Australian short-necked turtles
      - Genus Elusor, Cann & Legler, 1994 – Mary River turtle
      - Genus Myuchelys Thomson & Georges 2009 – Australian saw-shelled turtles
      - Genus Rheodytes Legler & Cann, 1980 – Fitzroy River turtles
    - Subfamily Chelinae Gray, 1825
      - Genus Chelus Duméril 1806 – matamata turtles
      - Genus Acanthochelys Gray, 1873 – South American side-necked swamp turtles
      - Genus Mesoclemmys – including gibba turtle
      - Genus Phrynops – toad-headed turtles
      - Genus Platemys Wagner 1830 – twist-necked turtles
      - Genus Ranacephala McCord, Joseph-Ouni & Lamar 2001 – Hoge's side-necked turtle
      - Genus Rhinemys – red-headed side-necked turtle
    - Subfamily Hydromedusinae Baur, 1893
      - Genus Hydromedusa Wagler 1830 – South American snake-necked turtles
      - Genus †Yaminuechelys de la Fuente et al. 2001 Anacleto Formation, Argentina, Santonian-Campanian La Colonia Formation, Allen Formation, Los Alamitos Formation, Argentina, Campanian-Maastrichtian, Salamanca Formation, Roca Formation, Argentina, Paleocene (Danian)
    - Subfamily Pseudemydurinae Zhang et al., 2017
      - Genus Pseudemydura Siebenrock 1901 – western swamp tortoise

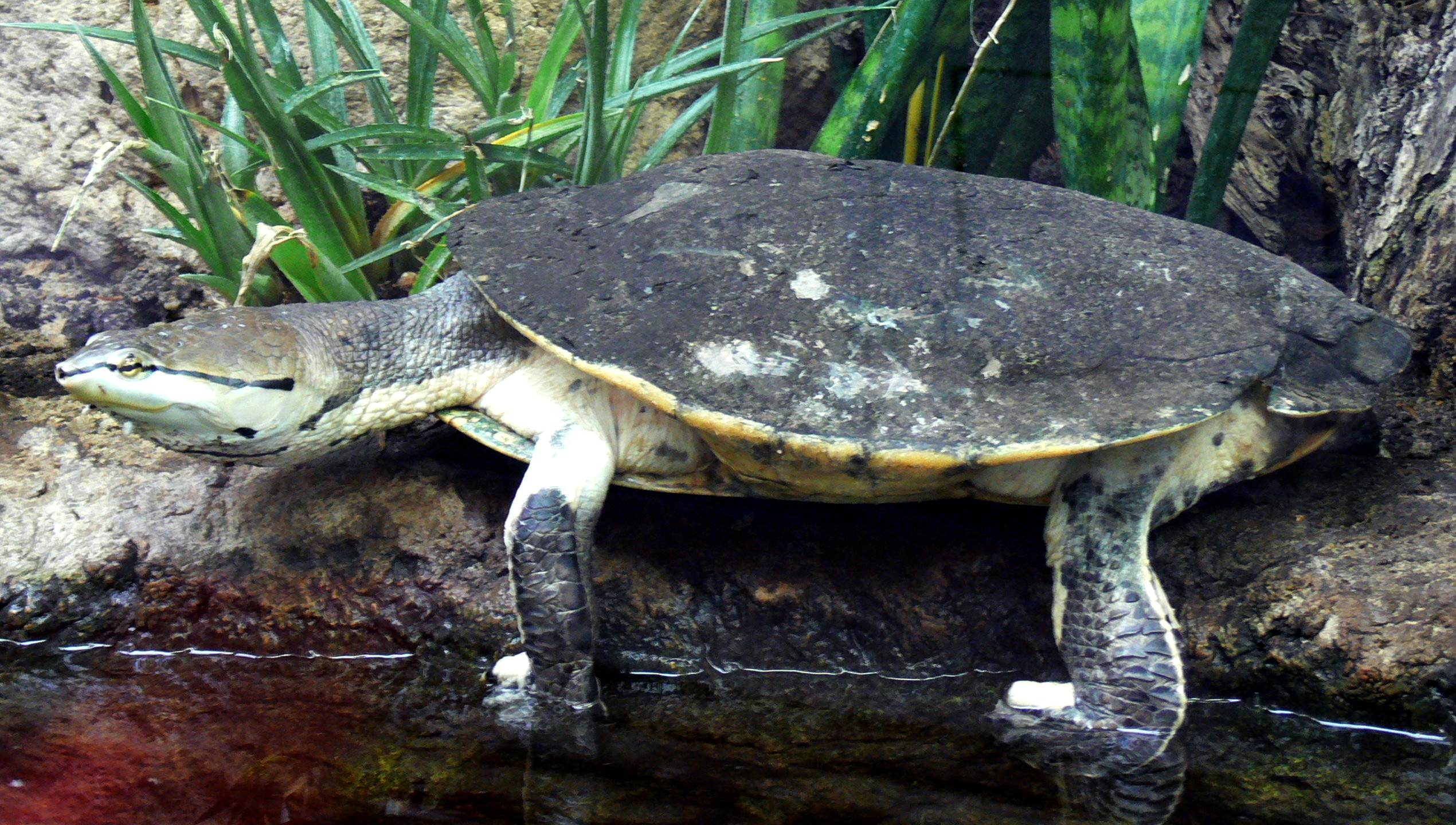
Phrynops hilarii

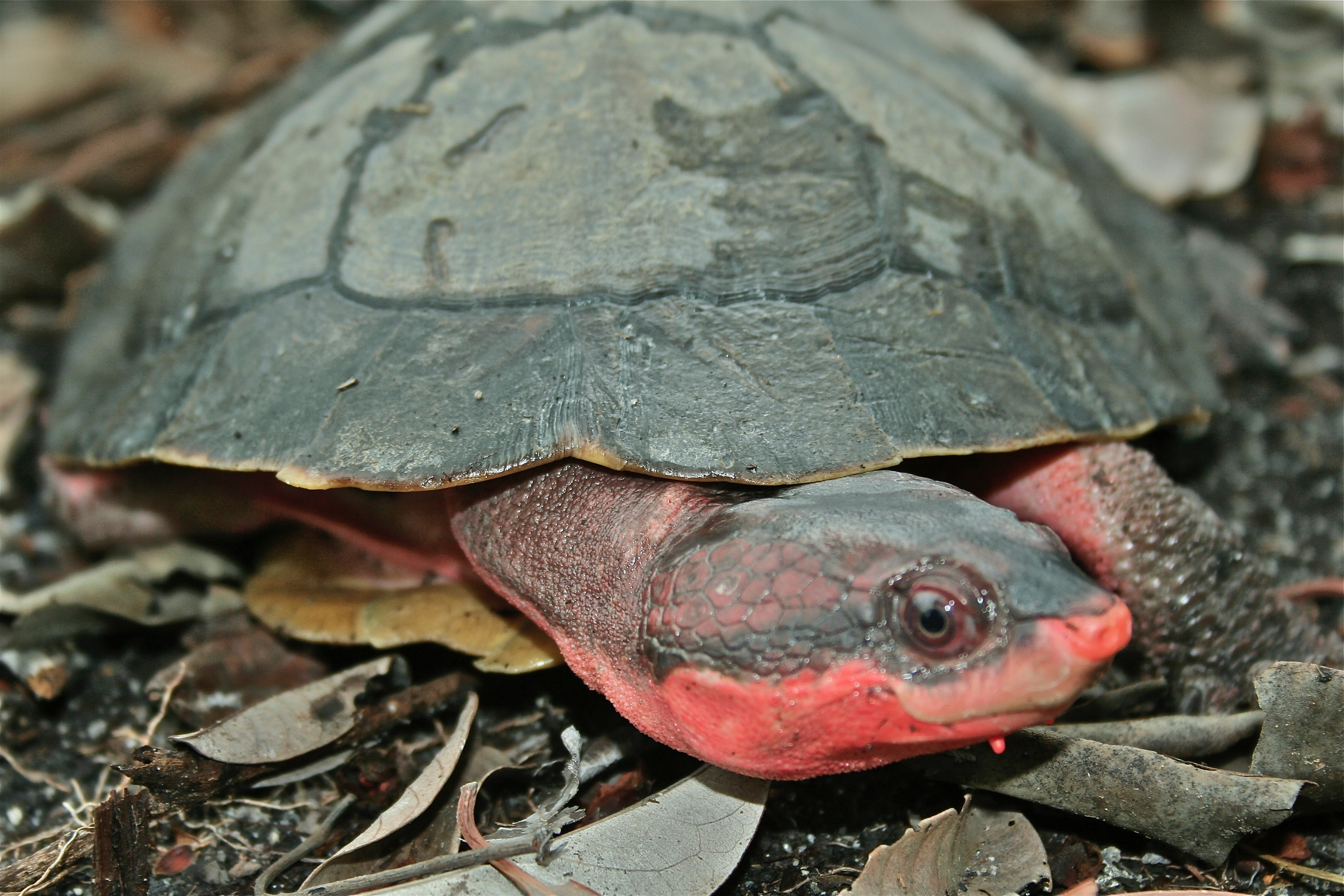
Rhinemys rufipes

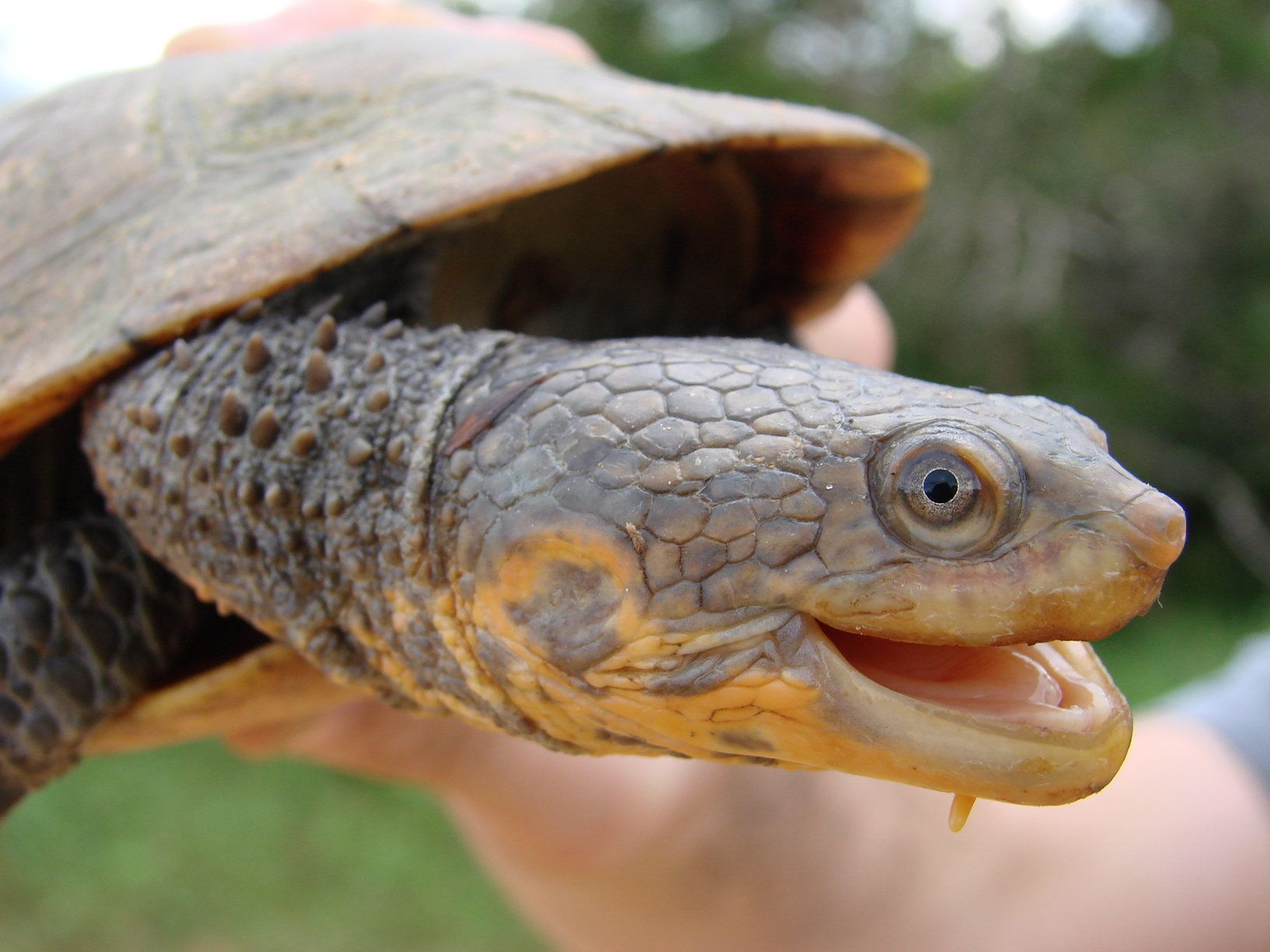
Mesoclemmys tuberculata

The following cladogram is based on a 2025 phylogenetic analysis of pan-chelids using Bayesian inference:

- - Araripemys barretoi
  - Pelomedusoides
- Pan‑Chelidae
  - - Rionegrochelys
    - - Phrynops paranaensis
      - - Bonapartemys
        - - - Mendozachelys
            - Calvarichelys
          - - Lomalatachelys
            - Palaeophrynops
  - - Prochelidella
    - Chelidae
      - Hesperochelida
        - - Hydromedusa
          - Yaminuechelys
        - Chelinae
          - Chelus
          - - - - Mesoclemmys
                - Phrynops
              - - Platemys
                - Acanthochelys
            - - Mesoclemmys
              - - - Mesoclemmys
                  - Rhinemys
                - Mesoclemmys
      - Austrochelida
        - - Chelodina alanrixi
          - Chelodininae
            Chelodina
        - - Pseudemydura
          - - - - Rheodytes
                - Elusor
              - - Birlimarr
                - Flaviemys
            - - Elseya
              - - Myuchelys
                - Emydura

The following cladogram is based on a maximum parsimony, total-evidence analysis of pan-Chelidae by Holley, Sterli, and Basso (2020), combining both morphological and genetic evidence:

- Stem-Chelidae (South American)
  - Prochelidella cerrobarcinae
  - - Rionegrochelys caldieroi
    - - Phrynops paranaensis
      - - - Palaeophrynops patagonicus
          - Bonapartemys bajobarrealis
        - - Mendozachelys wichmanni
          - Lomalatachelys nuequina
- Chelidae
  - Australian clade
    - Chelodina (polytomy)
    - - Pseudemydura
      - - Birlimarr gaffneyi
        - - - Rheodytes
            - - Elusor
              - Flaviemys
          - - Elseya
            - - Emydura
              - Myuchelys
  - South American clade
    - - - Hydromedusa casamayorensis
        - Yaminuechelys gasparinii
        - Yaminuechelys major
      - Hydromedusa
    - - Chelus
      - - Mesoclemmys
        - - - Phrynops
            - Mesoclemmys
            - Rhinemys
          - - Platemys
            - Acanthochelys

== External links and further reading ==
- Chelidae
- Gondwanan turtle site
