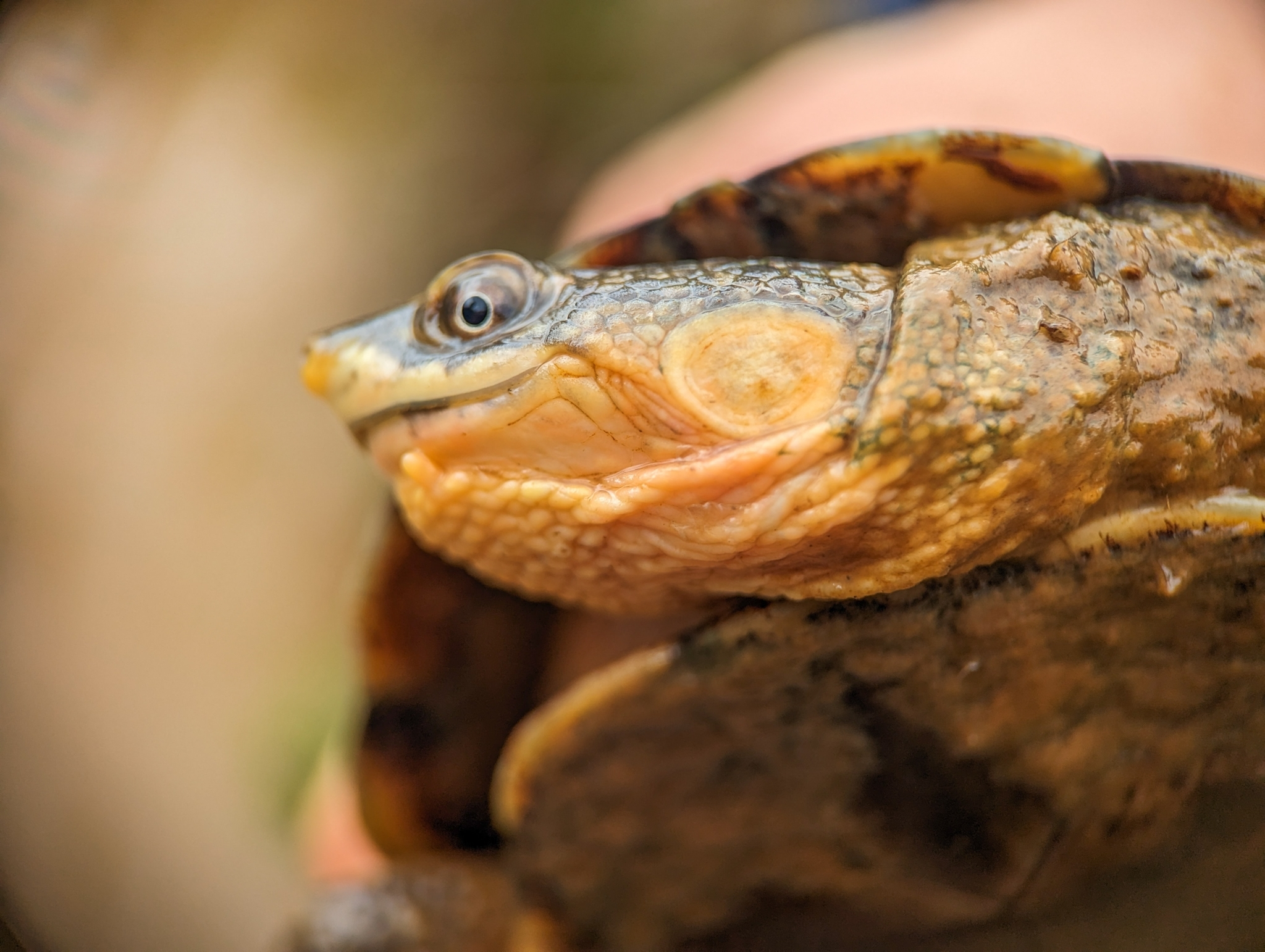

Conservation status
- Near Threatened (IUCN 2.3)

Scientific classification
- Kingdom: Animalia
- Phylum: Chordata
- Class: Reptilia
- Order: Testudines
- Suborder: Pleurodira
- Family: Chelidae
- Genus: Mesoclemmys
- Species: M. vanderhaegei

Binomial name
- Mesoclemmys vanderhaegei (Bour, 1973)
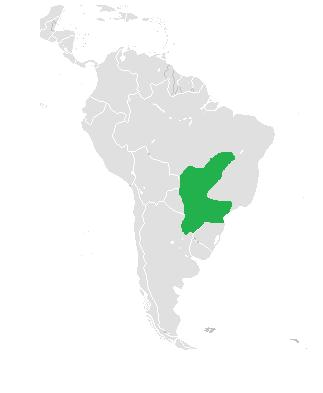

Synonyms
- Synonymy: Phrynops schoepfii Fitzinger in Diesing, 1840 (nomen nudum); Phrynops paraguayensis Vanzolini in Donoso-Barros, 1965 (nomen nudum); Phrynops tuberculatus vanderhaegei Bour, 1973; Phrynops (Batrachemys) vanderhaegei — Pritchard, 1979; Batrachemys vanderhaegei — Lema, 1994; Bufocephala vanderhaegei — McCord, Joseph-Ouni & Lamar, 2001; Bufocephalus vanderhaegei — Joseph-Ouni, 2004; Mesoclemmys vanderhaegei — Bour & Zaher, 2005; Bufocephala (Phrynops) vanderhaegi [sic] Bonin, Devaux & Dupré, 2006 (ex errore)

= Vanderhaege's toad-headed turtle =

Species of turtle

Vanderhaege's toad-headed turtle (Mesoclemmys vanderhaegei) is a species of turtle in the family Chelidae. The species is endemic to South America.

== Etymology ==
The specific name, vanderhaegei, is in honor of Maurice Vanderhaege, who is an expert in breeding reptiles in terraria.

== Description ==
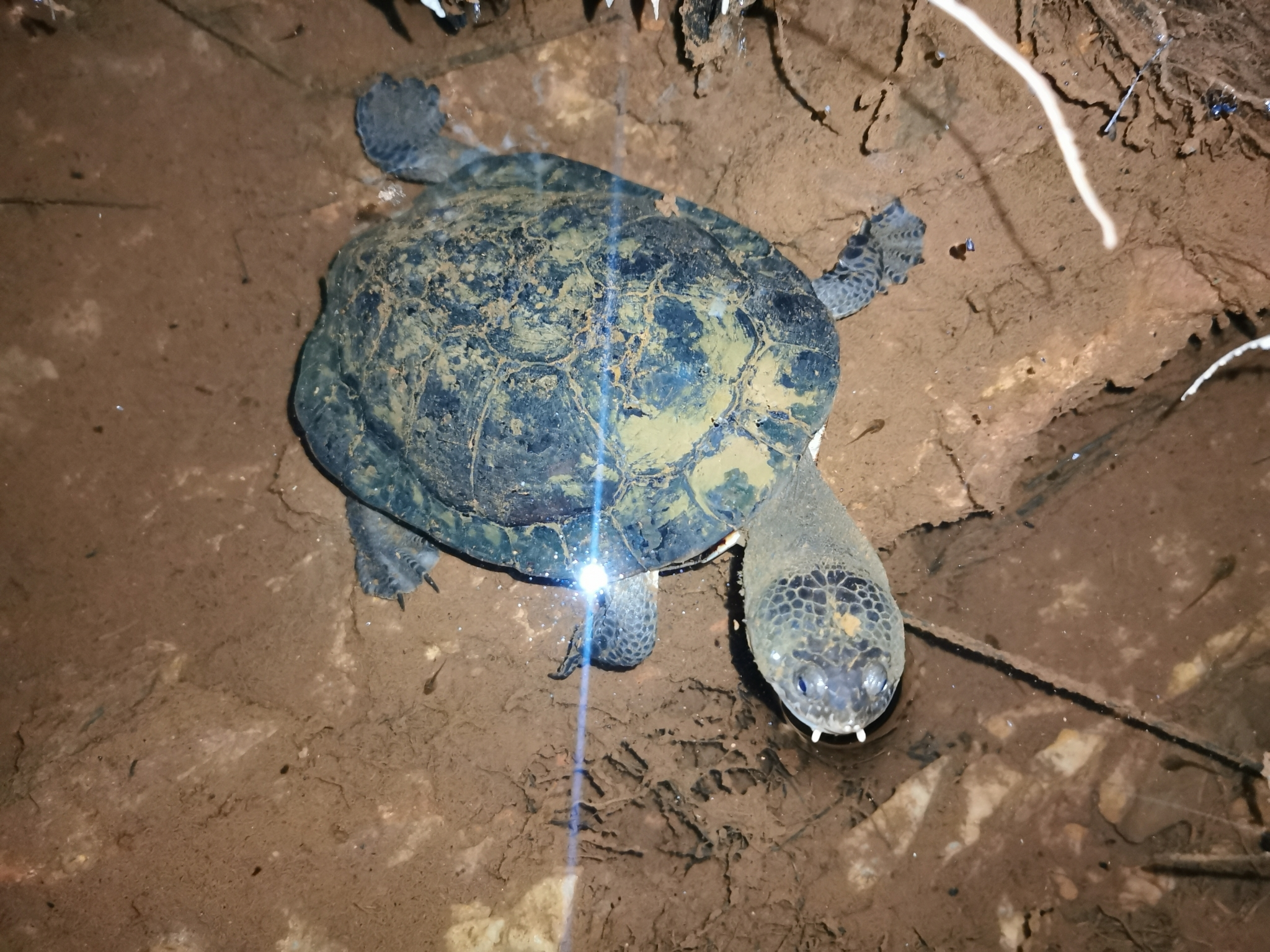
Vanderhaege's toad-headed turtle

M. vanderhaegei may grow to a carapace length of 27 cm (11 in). The ellipsoidal carapace, similar to that of M. gibbus but with a low medial groove, is somewhat serrated with a shallow subcaudal notch, and usually broadest at the 8th marginals and highest on the 3rd vertebral. Some rough striations may occur on the scutes. Vertebrals are broader than long. The carapace is brown to gray or black. The plastron covers much of the carapacial opening, is slightly upturned anteriorly, and is posteriorly notched. The intergular scute completely separates the gulars, but not the humerals, and is slightly shorter than, or about the same length as, its distance from the abdominals. The plastral formula is variable, but the femoral, abdominal and intergular scutes are usually longest. The plastron is yellow with a brown to black pattern which usually extends between the pectorals and femorals. Head and neck are considerably shorter than the carapace. The snout slightly protrudes and the upper jaw is neither notched nor serrated. Head and neck are gray, throat and chin yellow, and the yellowish upper jaws are seldom marked with dark pigment. Some orange vermiculations may occur on the head, and the lower jaw may be red. Other skin is gray to olive, and there is a fringe of large scales on the outer border of the forelimbs. Males have slightly longer, thicker tails with the vent nearer the tip, and a deep plastral notch. Females have a shallow plastral notch.

== Habitat and geographic range ==
Mesoclemmys vanderhaegei is known only from densely vegetated rivers and swamps in southern Brazil, Paraguay, and northern Argentina; possibly it also occurs in Bolivia and Uruguay.

== Natural history ==
Vanderhaege's toad-headed turtle is little known. M. vanderhaegei is diurnally active and carnivorous, and was characterized by Cei (1993) as aggressive, with a ferocious temper.

== Reproduction ==
Cei (1993) reports that the ellipsoidal eggs of M. vanderhaegei are 35 mm × 28 mm (1.4 in × 1.1 in).

== Taxonomy ==
Mesoclemmys vanderhaegei is closely related to M. gibbus, and may even be a subspecies of that species. It was first described by Bour (1973) as a subspecies of the broad-headed M. tuberculatus, but was raised to full species rank by Bour and Pauler (1987).

== Conservation status ==
IUCN Red List Status (1996) Lower risk: near threatened.
