= Peter Paul van Dijk =

Dutch conservation herpetologist

- Born: 1967 (age 58–59); Netherlands
- Education: National University of Ireland, Galway
- Known for: Conservation of Asian freshwater turtles
- Awards: Behler Turtle Conservation Award (2017)
- Scientific career
- Fields: Herpetology, Conservation biology
- Workplaces: Conservation International

Peter Paul van Dijk (born 1967) is a Dutch herpetologist and conservationist. His main focus is on the freshwater turtles of Southeast Asia.

== Biography ==
Van Dijk grew up in the Netherlands. In 1986, he moved to Ireland, where he studied Zoology at the University College Galway. He received his B.Sc. with honors in 1990 and continued with a research-based Ph.D. program, for which he received a postgraduate and travel scholarship from the National University of Ireland. During this period, he worked as a research associate at Chulalongkorn University in Bangkok, conducting ecological studies of the Elongated tortoise (Indotestudo elongata) in western Thailand. Alongside his doctoral work, Van Dijk was involved in numerous conservation-oriented research projects in Thailand focusing on forest and freshwater biodiversity and wetland management.

In 1998, Van Dijk earned his Ph.D. from the National University of Ireland with a dissertation titled The natural history of the elongated tortoise Indotestudo elongata (Blyth, 1853) (Reptilia: Testudines) in a hill forest mosaic in western Thailand with notes on sympatric turtle species. During his postdoctoral period, he continued conservation fieldwork in Thailand, including serving as lead implementer for a commissioned study on the status of land and freshwater turtles for the IUCN. He also participated in the third environmental impact assessment for the proposed Kaeng Sua Ten Dam. Concerned about the growing exploitation of turtles across Asia, Van Dijk transitioned from academia to the non-governmental conservation sector in December 1999. He applied for and was appointed as Senior Programme Officer at TRAFFIC Southeast Asia (TSEA), the regional branch of the global TRAFFIC network, a joint wildlife trade monitoring program of the IUCN and the WWF, based in Malaysia and covering all eleven ASEAN member states. His first assignment was to participate in a regional workshop on the trade of Asian turtles, form a working group to assess the conservation status of Asian land and freshwater turtles for the IUCN Red List, and edit the meeting proceedings. The resulting communiqué and recommendations were instrumental in expanding regulatory measures for freshwater turtles under the CITES.

In addition to organizational priorities such as ivory and timber trade monitoring, Van Dijk continued to focus on the trade in freshwater and land turtles. He authored the proposal for the Federal Agency for Nature Conservation (BfN) to develop medium- and long-term conservation measures for turtles in Asia. The project was completed in June 2003, having successfully proposed the inclusion of seven turtle species in CITES trade regulations and providing a detailed analysis of the state and trends of the Asian turtle trade.

Following a strategic shift at TRAFFIC away from species-specific projects, van Dijk left TSEA in September 2002 for personal reasons and returned to the Netherlands to concentrate exclusively on the conservation of land and freshwater turtles. His work included completing the BfN project for TRAFFIC, contributing editorially to the Conservation Biology of Tortoises & Freshwater Turtles project for the Chelonian Research Foundation, and preparing five further proposals on behalf of the United States and Indonesia for the inclusion of six additional freshwater turtle species under CITES trade regulations. In total, Van Dijk prepared nine proposals leading to the listing of 13 freshwater turtle species in the CITES appendices, all of which were adopted by the respective parties, including the United States, China, Germany, and Indonesia.

In November 2004, Van Dijk became Director of the Tortoise and Freshwater Turtle Conservation Program at Conservation International (CI). His main responsibilities include analyzing turtle trade, managing the IUCN Red List assessment process for tortoises and freshwater turtles, and developing and implementing conservation actions worldwide, including work with legislative and regulatory bodies in the United States and internationally. Since 1994, van Dijk has been a member of the IUCN Tortoise and Freshwater Turtle Specialist Group (TFTSG), and since 2000, he has served as the group’s Deputy Chair. The TFTSG is the leading expert body on turtle biology and conservation within the IUCN, comprising around 300 members worldwide. He also serves on the advisory board of the Turtle Survival Alliance, a 501(c)(3) nonprofit organization based in Texas, and the scientific board of the Asian Turtle Conservation Network in Vietnam. He is a founding member of the Turtle Conservation Fund, a cross-organizational funding initiative supporting critical turtle conservation actions globally.

Van Dijk is co-editor of the monograph series Conservation Biology of Tortoises & Freshwater Turtles and a member of the editorial boards of Chelonian Conservation and Biology—the first journal devoted exclusively to turtle conservation—and Emys.

== Awards and eponyms ==
In 2017, Van Dijk received the “Behler Turtle Conservation Award” from the IUCN/SSC Tortoise and Freshwater Turtle Specialist Group for his contributions to freshwater turtle conservation in Southeast Asia.

In 2003, William Patrick McCord and Peter C. H. Pritchard named the Burmese narrow-headed softshell turtle (Chitra vandijki) in his honor.
