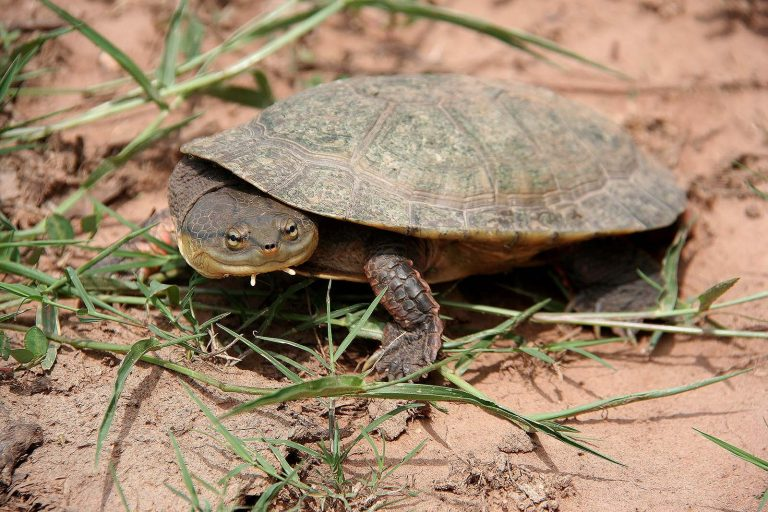

Conservation status
- Critically Endangered (IUCN 2.3)

Scientific classification
- Kingdom: Animalia
- Phylum: Chordata
- Class: Reptilia
- Order: Testudines
- Suborder: Pleurodira
- Family: Chelidae
- Genus: Mesoclemmys
- Species: M. dahli

Binomial name
- Mesoclemmys dahli (Zangerl & Medem, 1958)

Synonyms
- Phrynops (Batrachemys) dahli Zangerl & Medem, 1958; Batrachemys dahli — Zangerl & Medem, 1958 (recombination); Phrynops nasutus dahli — Zangerl & Medem, 1958 (recombination); Mesoclemmys dahli — Zangerl & Medem, 1958 (recombination)

= Dahl's toad-headed turtle =

Species of turtle

Dahl's toad-headed turtle (Mesoclemmys dahli) is a medium-sized species of side-necked turtle in the family Chelidae. This critically endangered freshwater turtle is endemic to northern Colombia, where it lives in small pools, streams, and swamps, but aestivates on land.

== Etymology ==
The specific name, dahli, is in honor of Swedish-born Colombian ichthyologist George Dahl (1905-1979), who collected the type specimen.

== Appearance ==
M. dahli has an olive to brown carapace, which is oval to elliptical (to 22.9 cm [9.0 in]) and widest behind the middle with a slightly serrated posterior rim. It is somewhat flattened dorsally, and the lateral marginals are upturned. A poorly developed vertebral keel may be present in juveniles and some adults. The flared 1st vertebral is the largest and broader than long, as is also the flared 5th. The 2nd and 3rd vertebrals are also usually broader than long, but the 4th, the smallest of the series, may be slightly longer or as long as broad. The cervical scute is normally longer than broad. The well-developed plastron is notched posteriorly. Its fore lobe is longer and broader than the hind lobe; the narrowness of the posterior lobe is particularly noticeable in males, and its breadth is only 36-38% of the plastral length. The bridge is relatively broad. We have seen few specimens of Mesoclemmys dahli, but in those measured the plastral formula was: intergul > fem > abd > pect > an > hum >< gul. The intergular completely separates the gulars. Plastron, bridge, and undersides of the marginals are cream to yellow with gray pigment outlining the seams. The head is large and broad with a slightly projecting snout and slightly notched upper jaw. There are two chin barbels, and the dorsal surface of the head is covered with small to large, irregularly shaped scales. Dorsally, the head is gray to olive brown, but the upper jaw, tympanum, and sides are cream to yellow. Lower jaw, chin, and barbels are yellow. The neck is gray dorsally but lighter ventrally. No horny tubercles are present on the neck. Limbs and tail are gray to olive brown on the outside but lighter beneath.

Males have longer, thicker tails, narrower posterior plastral lobes, and narrower heads. The head of the female is swollen behind the eyes..

== Genetics ==
The karyotype of M. dahli is 2n = 58: 22 macrochromosomes, 36 microchromosomes. It differs from that of M. nasuta in having the 8th chromosome pair biarmed.

== Distribution ==
M. dahli is only known from the lower Magdalena and Sinú river basins in the Atlántico, Bolívar, Córdoba and Sucre Departments in northern Colombia.

== Habitat ==
Medem (1966) reported that the habitat at the type locality of M. dahli was originally ponds and small brooks within forests, but with the clearing of the woodlands the entire area around the type locality has been transformed into pastures. There, turtles seem to prefer shallow, quiet water bodies, where they fill a bottom-dwelling niche. Aestivation occurs during dry periods.

== Reproduction ==
Medem (1966) reported the mating season of M. dahli in Colombia as June and July with nesting occurring mainly in September and October, but it may extend through the year. Apparently several clutches of one to six eggs are laid by each female. The white eggs are ellipsoidal (29-35 x 23–28 mm) with brittle shells, and hatchlings have carapaces about 28–30 mm long.

== Diet ==
M. dahli is predominantly carnivorous, feeding on snails, aquatic insects, other aquatic invertebrates, fish, and amphibians; carrion is also eaten.
