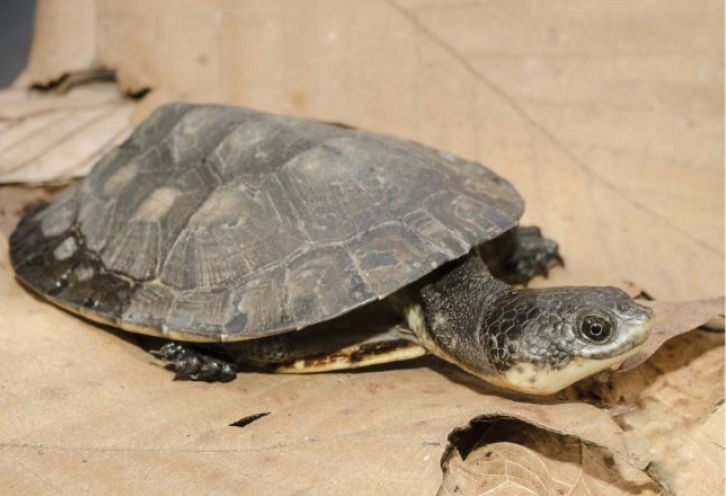
- Mesoclemmys gibba

Scientific classification
- Kingdom: Animalia
- Phylum: Chordata
- Class: Reptilia
- Order: Testudines
- Suborder: Pleurodira
- Family: Chelidae
- Subfamily: Chelinae
- Genus: Mesoclemmys; Gray, 1873

Synonyms
- Mesoclemmys Gray, 1873:305; Batrachemys Stejneger, 1909:126; Bufocephala McCord, Joseph-Ouni, and Lamar 2001:715; Ranacephala McCord, Joseph-Ouni, and Lamar 2001:715

= Mesoclemmys =

Genus of turtles

Mesoclemmys is a genus of South American turtles in the family Chelidae.

== Species ==
Species include:

- Mesoclemmys dahli (Zangerl & Medem, 1958) – Dahl's toad-headed turtle
- Mesoclemmys gibba (Schweigger, 1812) – Gibba turtle
- Mesoclemmys heliostemma (McCord, Joseph-Ouni & Lamar, 2001)
- Mesoclemmys jurutiensis Cunha, Sampaio, Carneiro & Vogt, 2021
- Mesoclemmys nasuta (Schweigger, 1812)
- Mesoclemmys perplexa Bour & Zaher, 2005
- Mesoclemmys raniceps (Gray, 1856) – Amazon toad-headed turtle
- Mesoclemmys sabiniparaensis Cunha, Sampaio, Carneiro, Vogt, Mittermeier, Rhodin & Andrade, 2022
- Mesoclemmys tuberculata (Luederwaldt, 1926) – Tuberculate toad-headed turtle
- Mesoclemmys vanderhaegei (Bour, 1973) – Vanderhaege's toad-headed turtle
- Mesoclemmys zuliae (Pritchard & Trebbau, 1984) – Zulia toad-headed turtle
- †Mesoclemmys vanegasorum (Cadena et al., 2020) – La Victoria Formation, Laventan Colombia

Nota bene: A binomial authority in parentheses indicates that the species was originally described in a genus other than Mesoclemmys.
