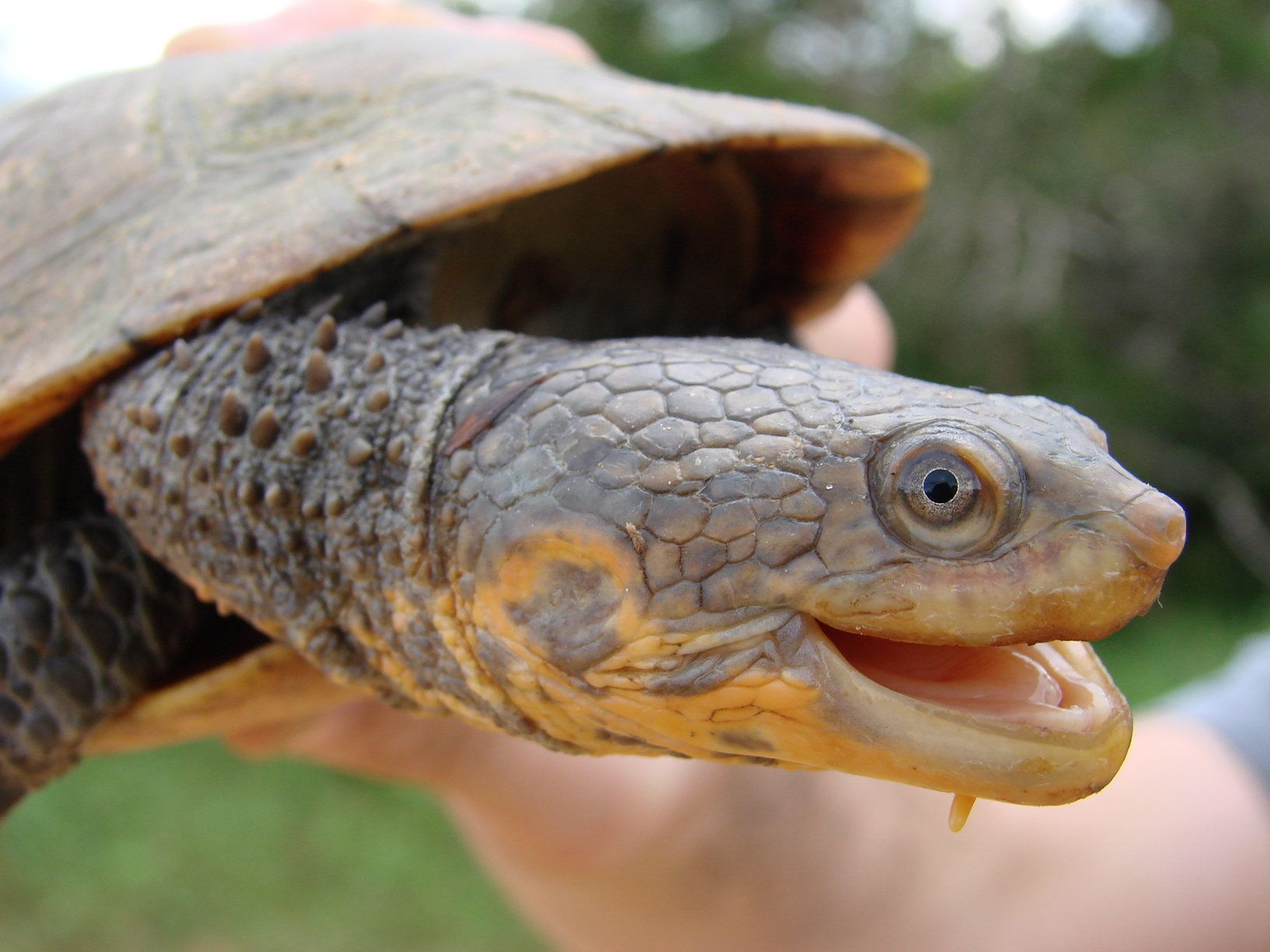

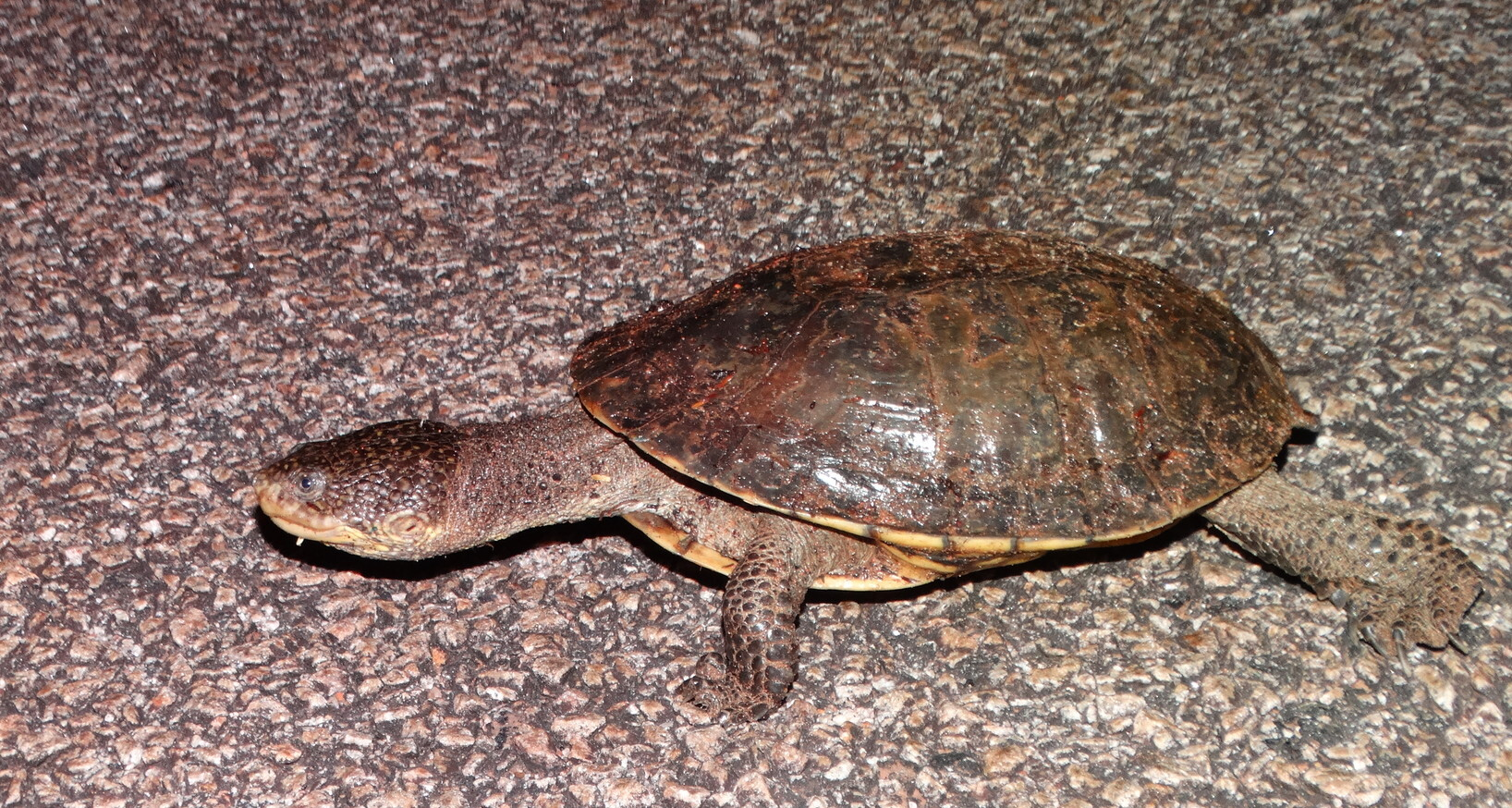

Scientific classification
- Kingdom: Animalia
- Phylum: Chordata
- Class: Reptilia
- Order: Testudines
- Suborder: Pleurodira
- Family: Chelidae
- Genus: Mesoclemmys
- Species: M. tuberculata

Binomial name
- Mesoclemmys tuberculata (Luederwaldt, 1926)

Synonyms
- List: Rhinemys tuberculata Luederwaldt, 1926; Batrachemys tuberculata Fróes, 1957; Phrynops (Batrachemys) tuberculata Zangerl & Medem, 1958; Phrynops (Batrachemys) tuberculatus Mertens, 1970; Phrynops tuberculatus tuberculatus Bour, 1973; Batrachemys tubercalata Nutaphand, 1979 (ex errore); Phrynops tubercularis Rogner, 1996 (ex errore); Mesoclemmys tuberculata Bour & Zaher, 2005

= Mesoclemmys tuberculata =

Species of turtle

The tuberculate toad-headed turtle, Mesoclemmys tuberculata is a species of freshwater turtle. It is found in northeastern Brazil. The species was first described by the German-born Brazilian zoologist Hermann Luederwaldt in 1926 as Rhinemys tuberculata.

== Morphology ==
The carapace ranges from light brown to black. The plastron is yellow-orange. The head and neck have a dark grey dorsal surface and a lighter yellow to gray ventral surface. The neck is protected by cone-shaped tubercules, from which the species derives its common name.

Female tuberculate toad-headed turtles are larger and heavier than males. Male turtles have a mean carapace length of around 18 cm while females average around 21 cm. The largest known specimen, a female in captivity, had a carapace length of 23.5 cm. Male turtles have longer and thicker tails than females.

== Distribution ==
The tuberculate toad-headed turtle inhabits semi-arid and coastal ecosystems in northeastern Brazil. It lives in rivers, ponds, lakes, temporary streams and manmade ponds and reservoirs. The turtles show a preference for slow-moving bodies of water. They migrate between bodies of water, likely in response to resource availability.

== Ecology ==
A survery of tuberculate toad-headed turtles in northeastern Brazil found that the species feeds mainly on Odonata (dragonfly and damselfly) nymphs. The turtles also fed on other aquatic insects. The remains of terrestrial insects, fish, shrimp, mollusks, and snakes (genus Epictia) have also been found among the stomach contents of studied individuals.

The turberculate toad-headed turtle is parasitized by helminths which the turtle likely acquires through the ingestion of the parasites primary host insects. The nematode Spiroxys figueiredoi has been shown to cause erosive ulceration of the turtle's gastric mucosa. The turtle is also parasitized by the nematodes Serpinema monospiculatus and Physaloptera retusa. One study noted a positive correlation between carapace length and helminth abundance, with larger individuals hosting more parasites than smaller individuals.

The argentine black and white tegu (Salvator merianae) has been observed preying on tuberculate toad-headed turtle nests.

== Reproduction ==
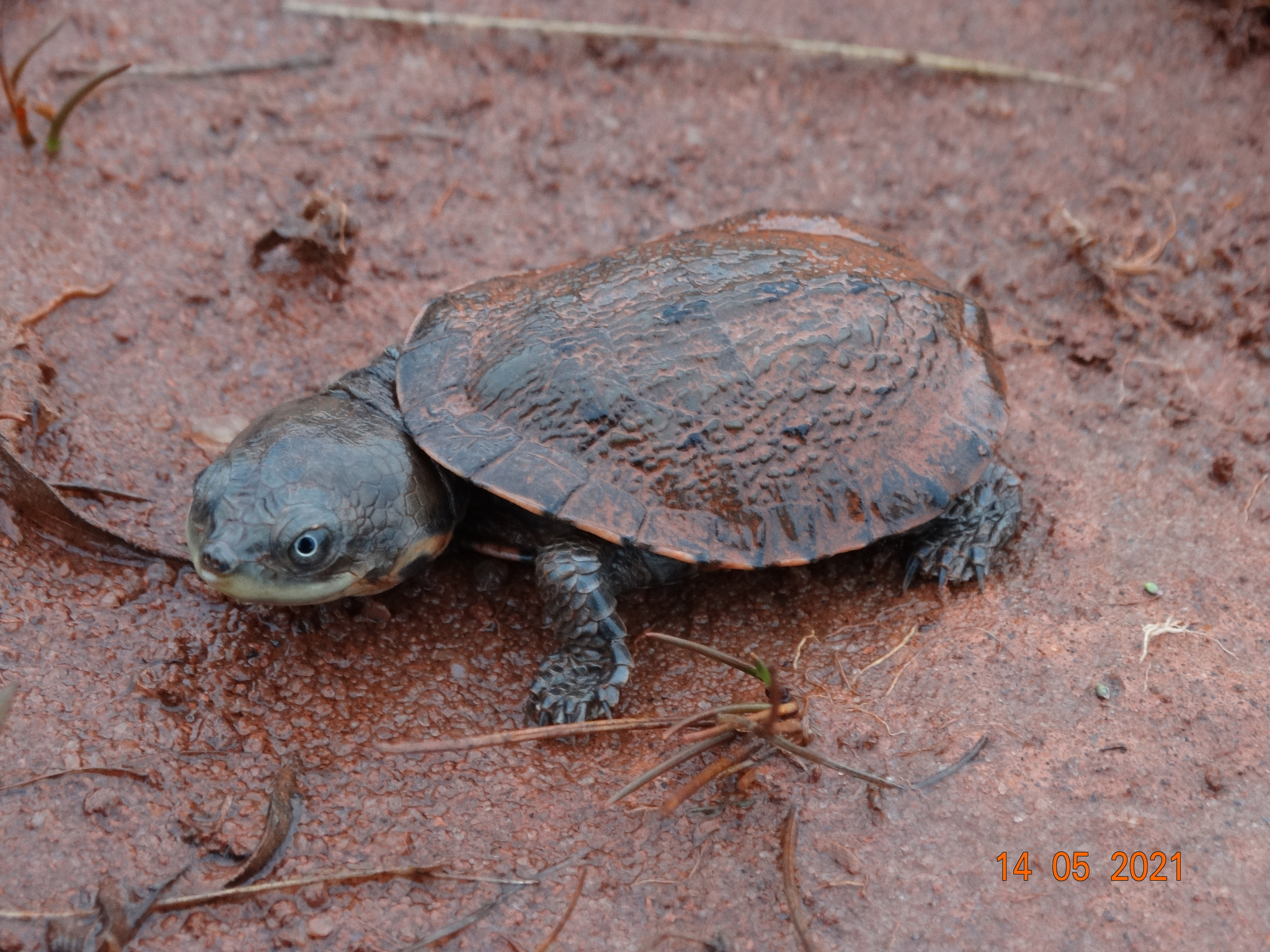
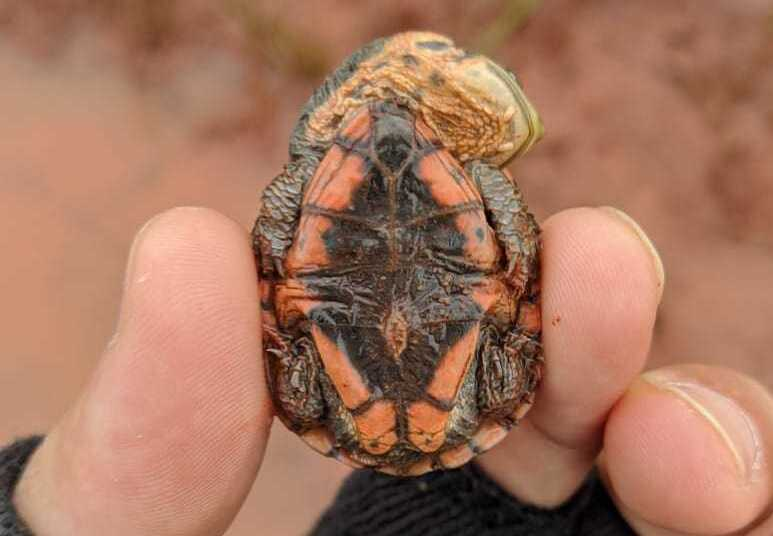
Hatchling

Females are thought to reach reproductive maturity at around 12 − 13 cm in length. Females have been found to simultaneously carry eggs and developed vitellogenic follicles, suggesting that they lay more than one clutch of eggs in a single breeding season. The eggs are slightly ellipsoid in shape.

The carapaces of the hatchlings are dark brown with an orange border and black and gray spots. The carapace is more oval in shape than that of the adult turtle.

== Conservation status ==
The tuberculate toad-headed turtle is threatened by habitat loss due to deforestation for agricultural purposes. The presence of invasive species such as Trachemys dorbigni, the T. scripta scripta, and T. scripta elegans may compete with the turberculate toad-headed turtle for resources. The presence of invasive turtle species also presents a disease risk to native turtle populations.

M. tuberculata is also consumed by local populations, used in traditional medicines, and occasionally sold for use in the pet trade.

The species has been successfully bred in captivity.
