= Kittipong Jaruthanin =

Kittipong Jaruthanin (Thai: กิตติพงษ์ จารุธาณินทร์ or spelt Kittipong Jarutanin; born 1958 in Bangkok) is a Thai nature explorer, ichthyologist, collector, and aquarist known for his extensive fieldwork across Thailand and neighbouring regions. He has explored river basins such as the Mekong, Mae Klong, Salween, and Chao Phraya, as well as unique ecosystems like the Sirindhorn Peat Swamp Forest, the largest peat swamp in Thailand.

Kittipong developed a deep interest in freshwater fish from a young age and has been actively involved in fish collection since 1975. In 1982, he focused his research on the paradise threadfin (Polynemus paradiseus), captured from the mouth of the Bangkok Noi Canal near Phra Pinklao Bridge. He is credited as the first person in the world to successfully raise this wild-caught species in captivity, a groundbreaking achievement in freshwater fishkeeping and ichthyology in Thailand.

As a discoverer and collaborator, he has contributed numerous freshwater fish and aquatic animal specimens to taxonomy and scientific study, helping to identify many new species worldwide. Notable examples include the giant freshwater stingray (Himantura chaophraya), thinlip barb (Probarbus labeaminor), Schistura jarutanini, S. kayosonei, roughback whipray (Himantura kittipongi), and the Burmese narrow-headed softshell turtle (Chitra vandijki).

In the case of the Burmese narrow-headed softshell turtle, Kittipong personally conducted thorough research to confirm it as a new species. Unfortunately, due to delays in the data transmission process, the scientific name he proposed was deemed a synonym (nomen nudum) and thus is not officially recognized.

Beyond his scientific pursuits, he is a frequent contributor to aquarium magazines in Thailand. He also owns an aquarium shop specializing in wild-caught fish, located at the Sunday Market within Chatuchak Weekend Market in Bangkok. Additionally, he operates a small private zoo called "Home Zoo," where he keeps exotic pets and rare species such as capybara (Hydrochoerus hydrochaeris), flamingos (Phoenicopteridae), Asian narrow-headed softshell turtle (Chitra chitra), Malaysian giant turtle (Orlitia borneensis), albino elephant trunk snake (Acrochordus javanicus), Australian lungfish (Neoceratodus forsteri), Lyle's flying fox (Pteropus lylei), Chinese water dragon (Physignathus cocincinus), and even the famous coco de mer palm (Lodoicea maldivica).
