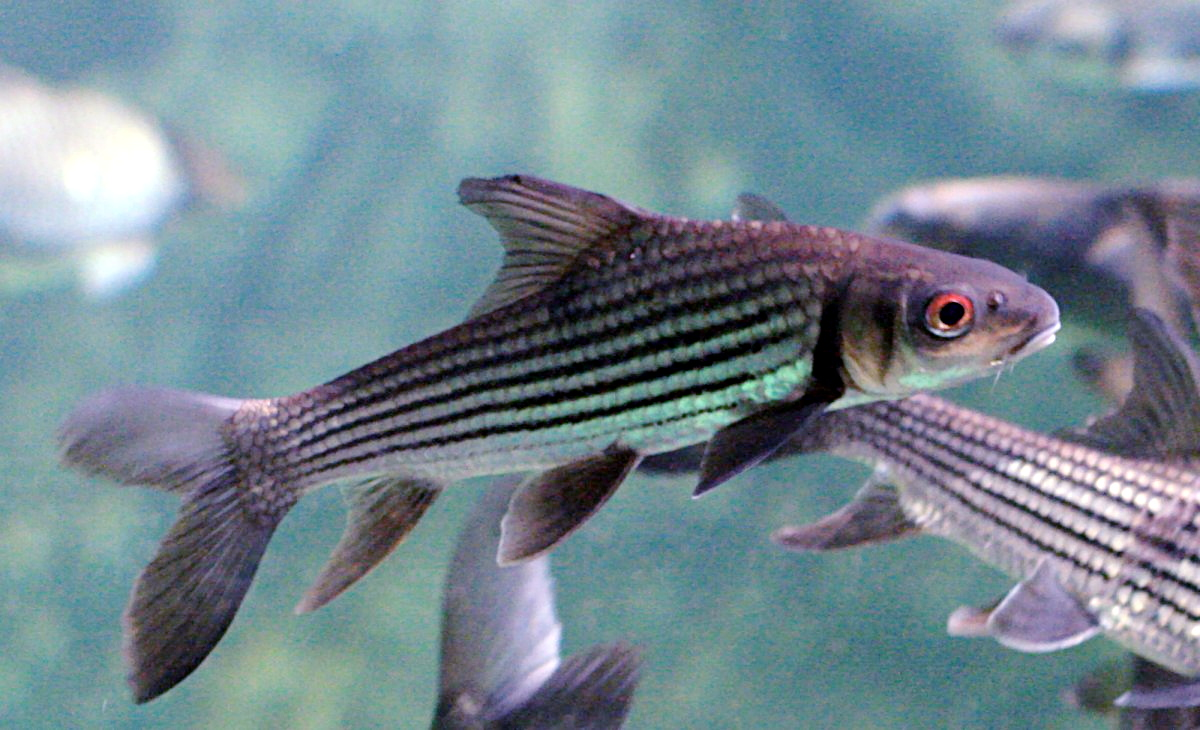

Conservation status
- Critically Endangered (IUCN 3.1)
- CITES Appendix I

Scientific classification
- Kingdom: Animalia
- Phylum: Chordata
- Class: Actinopterygii
- Division: Teleostei
- Order: Cypriniformes
- Family: Cyprinidae
- Genus: Probarbus
- Species: P. jullieni

Binomial name
- Probarbus jullieni Sauvage, 1880

= Jullien's golden carp =

Species of fish

The Jullien's golden carp (Probarbus jullieni) is a species of endangered freshwater ray-finned fish in the family Cyprinidae found in Southeast Asian river basins. Its existence is being threatened by various economic activities, such as large-scale agriculture and the building of dams for hydropower.

== Etymology and taxonomic history ==
The Jullien's golden carp was named by French paleontologist, ichthyologist, and herpetologist Henri Émile Sauvage. Other commonly used names for this fish are the carpilla ikan temoleh and the seven-striped barb.

Named in honor of J. Jullien, who collected the type specimen, possibly physician-zoologist Jules Jullien (1842–1897), who served as ship's doctor on a number of French expeditions and (later, in 1888) as president of the Zoological Society of France.

This fish is a species of freshwater ray-finned fish in the order Cypriniformes. Some defining characteristics of fish in the Cypriniform order is that they are generally found in freshwater, are ray-finned, and lack proper spines. There are 26 families in this order, and the Jullien's golden carp is part of the family Cyprinidae. Cyprinidae includes more species of fish than any other fish family. Two common types of fish found in this family are carp and minnows, both of which are characterized by their convex dorsal and ventral surfaces, lack of adipose fin, and thin lips.

== Description ==
=== Identification ===
This fish has many identifying characteristics. Most noticeable are its five longitudinal stripes above its lateral line. For its teeth, it has large pharyngeal teeth in a single row. Pharyngeal teeth are located in the throat of some species of fish, specifically the pharyngeal arch of these fishes' throats. In order to feel, it has maxillary barbels—whisker like appendages that serve as tactile organs near its mouth. These whiskers allow it to better feel its surroundings. For movement, it has a dorsal fin with one spine and nine branched rays and five branched anal rays. Its maximum total length is approximately 165 cm (65 in) and its maximum weight is approximately 70 kg (150 lb). It can live up to 50 years and gradually grows in size over time. This is responsible for its large size.

=== Behavior ===
This fish eats freshwater shellfish, prawns, and aquatic plants. They tend to eat more during the wet season, when food is abundant, and less during the dry season, when food is scarce. Like many other river fish, its lifecycle is dependent on monsoon rains, which means that the Jullien's golden carp occupies different regions throughout the year depending on the season.

=== Reproduction ===
This fish is migratory, and its migratory pattern centers around its mating season. Adults migrate upstream during the dry season to form spawning communities in deep pools of low water. Once the spawning is over, the recently hatched fish enter floodplains during the rainy season. This means that its migratory pattern centers around the shift from dry to rainy season. This migratory pattern is vital for the survival of this endangered species, but various threats to its habitat, such as aquaculture and hydropower development threaten this pattern, and thus their existence.

=== Habitat ===
Historically, this fish was found in the Mekong, Irrawaddy, Chao Phraya, Meklong, Pahang, and Perak River Basins of Southeast Asia, specifically in Thailand, Laos, Cambodia, Vietnam, Myanmar, and Malaysia. Now, this fish is found mainly in the Mekong River Basin, however there are some small populations in the Pahang and Perak River basins. In these river basins, Jullien's carp are found in fast rapids and clear pools of water. During the rainy season they live in deep waters, but during the dry season, which is also their spawning season, they live in shallow waters.

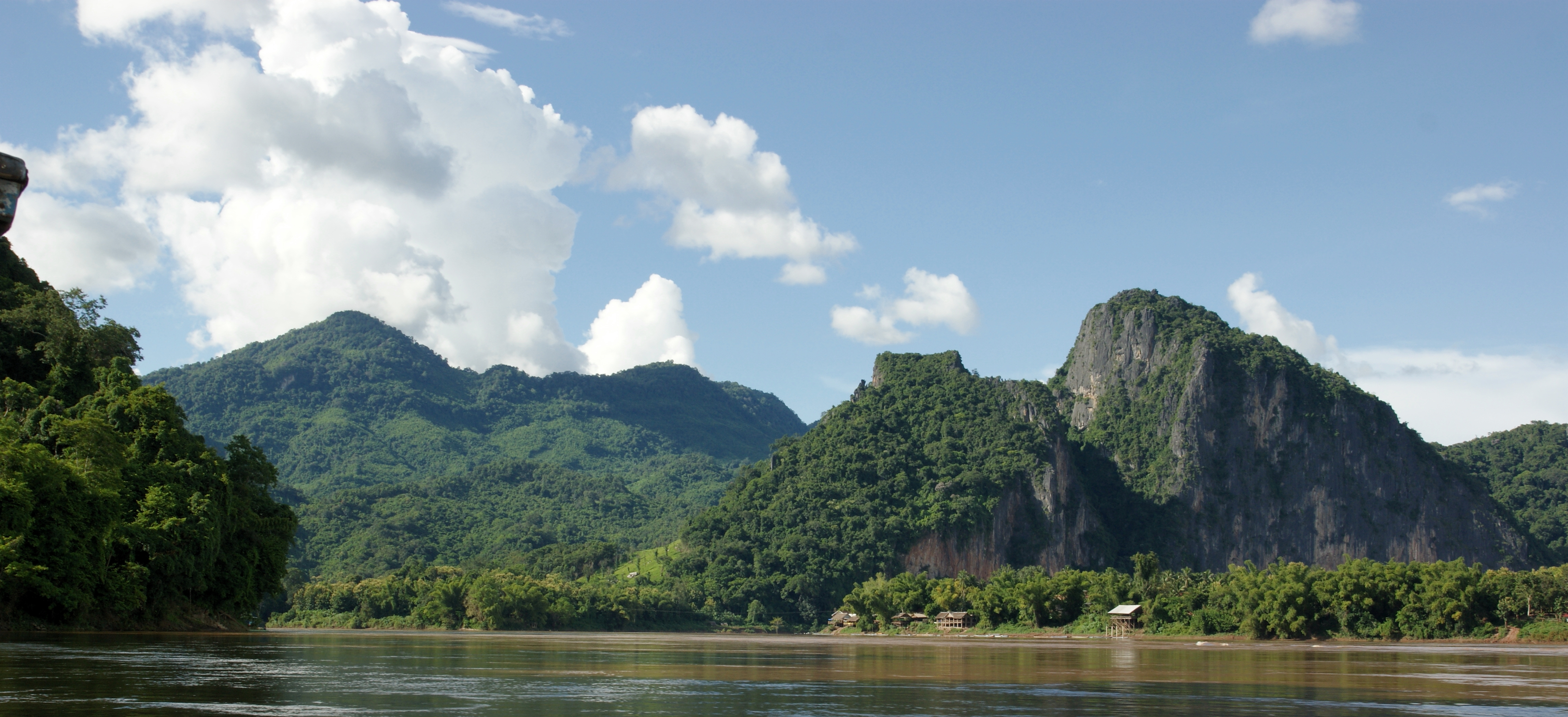
A view of the Mekong River at Luang Prabang in Laos

== Threats ==
=== Aquaculture ===
Increasingly, these fish are being breed artificially for aquaculture. This is a common practice in Laos and Thailand. In order to capture wild fish, aquaculture sites set up large-mesh gill netting at spawning sites. Not only does this capture many wild Jullien's golden carp, but it also stops them from spawning, further diminishing their numbers.

The Fisheries Department in Batu Berendam, Malacca in Malaysia are developing and applying spawning techniques through its Fresh Water Fisheries Research Centre. The economic component of this project is paramount, with the goal of the project to increase the aquaculture production target to 200,000 tons of fish by 2010. As of 2012, this number has been greatly surpassed and there are now approximately 2.5 million metric tons of fish, including the Jullien's golden carp, being harvested per year. The value of this harvest is estimated at US$3.6 to 6.5 billion. The goal of this project is to boost production of freshwater fish, creating more of a commodity that is valued by consumers. This means that little effort is being made to preserve the endangered species of fish they are breeding, such as the Jullien's golden carp.

=== As food ===
This fish is a popular delicacy in Southeast Asia, but because they are so rare they are very expensive. They are usually sold for RM1,000. Due to its cost, the Jullien's golden carp is only commercially served in a select few restaurants in Southeast Asia, specifically in Malaysia and Myanmar. This contributes to the illegal fishing of these fish in prohibited, conservation areas. The problem is that, although these fish can be bought more cheaply and readily from aqua fisheries, wild caught ones are more in demand. Recently, the opening up of countries like Myanmar and the subsequent increase in tourism has led to an increased "exotic food enthusiast" market in Southeast Asia. This market encourages local fisherman to go into the red zone, an area of wildlife conservation where the public is only allowed to engage in small-scale fishing. However, the Burmese government stated in March, 2014 that the Jullien's golden carp's special protection program makes fishing for them from February to April illegal. However, other times of the year the regulations surrounding the fishing, capturing, and selling of fish such as the Jullien's golden carp are much more relaxed. This has made the overfishing of the Jullien's golden carp both easy and common.

=== Hydropower development ===
In 1994, the Mekong River Commission (MRC) identified 12 sites for dams in the major rivers of Laos, Thailand, and Cambodia. This has since expanded to include Myanmar.

Since the Irrawaddy River Basin is one of the last areas of refuge for the Jullien's golden carp, the recent creation of the Myitsone Dam in Myanmar is further threatening its existence. However, as of 2011, the usage of this dam is suspended due to international, regional, and national conservation efforts.

The Xayaburi Dam in Lao PDR is another hydropower threat. Since the Jullien's golden carp has a relatively large population in the Mekong River, the consequences of this dam could be disastrous. The Mekong River Commission estimates that this dam could disastrously impact the movements of migratory fish and reduce the amount of fish caught by 270,000 to 600,000 metric tons. What makes these numbers problematic is the fact that they would mainly affect the local people. What happens with dams is that migratory fish are unable to move upstream and thus are caught in artificial lakes created by the dams. This would create a new fish supply for the state, while decreasing the fish supply for the local people.

By threatening the existence of fish such as the Jullien's golden carp, these dams are also threatening the existence of fisheries in the long-term. Thus, although in the short-term these dams will provide much economic stimulus, Lao PDR is estimated to obtain $2.5 billion a year in revenue. Although these dams and the hydropower they create aid in placating the energy demand in Southeast Asia, this energy demand is destroying the regions traditionally sustainable, local industries. The fishing and agriculture industries in the Mekong River Basin stand to lose $500 million a year if the Myitsone and The Xayaburi Dams continue operating or if any new dams are built. This is according to the study being done by the Mekong River Commission (MRC).

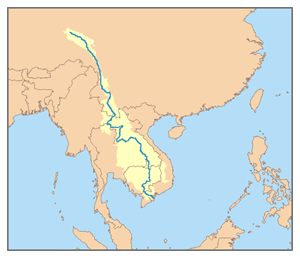
A map of the Mekong River basin

The creation of dams and their negative effect on fish is not a new concept. Many opponents of these dams are citing the more than 3,000 dams that have been built along the Zhujiang River during the last 40 years as relating to the Myitsone and Xayaburi Dams. In the Zhujiang River, the numbers of many migratory fish, such as many major carp species, have fallen. This shows what could happen to migratory fish such as the Jullien's golden carp. Another fact that relates the Jullien's carp to the carp species affected by dams in the Zhujiang River is the fact that they are both carps. Thus, the similarities concerning the carp species in the Zhujiang River and the Jullien's golden carp is telling of what could happen to the Jullien's carp if the Myitsoone and Xayaburi Dams continue.

=== Pollution through deforestation ===
Through the drainage of peat swamp forests, the acidity of river systems such as the Mekong River Basin has dramatically increased. Thus, the River Valleys become drainage basins and are known as "blackwater streams." This pollution through deforestation also affects the local people. In Le Grand Lac of Cambodia, which is connected to the Mekong River Basin by the Tonlé Sap River, deforestation has caused pollution, which in turn has created a reduction of food, erosion, and siltation. Although there is legislation in many countries of Southeast Asia, such as Thailand, Indonesia, and Malaysia, this legislation is weakly enforced. Furthermore, after deforestation occurs, the land that used to be forests is filled in with cash crops. These cash crops require much energy in order to be produced and harvested, and the run-off from this energy goes into rivers and river basins. This affects the runoff patterns of these areas, hurting the lifecycles of freshwater fish, as well as local fishing industries. Since the lifecycle of the Jullien's golden carp is dependent upon seasonal shifts in river/lake water (such as shifts in currents), the pollution of rivers and lakes is Southeast Asia has diminished their numbers.

=== Pollution through agriculture production ===
Although anti-pollution legislation is present both collectively in Southeast Asia and nationally in Southeast Asian countries, it is rarely enforced. This is due to the mentality to economic expansion through modernization present in Southeast Asian states. Much of this expansion is not done by the locals, but by the governments of Southeast Asian countries. Industries in Southeast Asian have expanded without proper water treatment facilities, causing its rivers to be oxygen-poor for much of the year. Although the agriculture techniques in Southeast Asia are becoming more modern, this increase is cash crops is coming at the expense of the regions other large industry: fish. This means that this region will lack industry diversification.

== Conservation ==
=== International efforts ===
The Mekong River Commission (MRC), established in 1995, had now become an independent international oversight organization instead of a United Nations body. It has four member countries, Lao PDR, Thailand, Cambodia, and Vietnam, and the purpose of this organization is to create studies before any dams or other public works projects are put in place in the Mekong River Basin of any of its connecting rivers. However, since this body is merely an oversight organization, it lacks legal authority.

Recently, NGOs expressed concern about the creation of the Myitsone Dam. These human rights groups and environmental Non-governmental Organizations (NGOs) with Burmese opposition leader Aung San Suu Kyi to pressure the Burmese government to halt the usage of the Myitsone Dam. However, these groups also lacked legal authority. Thus, these groups relied on rallying international pressure to stop the usage of the Myitsone Dam. This has led to a large activist movement against the dam, and, due to Myanmar's recent status as a democratic country; the country has listened to the complaints of its people. However, activists in Myanmar fear that this is merely meant to placate them, and fear that usage of the Myitsone Dam will continue in the near future.

Many Southeast Asian countries have research groups that are creating their own studies to show the negative effects that dams have on the environment, specifically water and fish. The International Water Management Institute (IWMI) in Lao PDR is one such group. These research groups, including the one listed above may be regionally based, but they are part of the internal effort to stop environmental degradation. The IWMI is part of the Consultative Group on International Agriculture Research; along with 15 other nonprofit research groups, private foundations, and international organizations. This shows the increasing trend of regional research groups partnering with NGOs to gain more power and create more change.

=== Regional and national efforts ===
In Bandar Tenggara near Desaru in Johor, Malaysia, there is a project called Vita Tenggarra that centers around the breeding of threatened or nearly extinct fresh water fish found in the river basins of Southeast Asia. One of the fish they are breeding is the Jullien's golden carp. In their 24ha lake and over 30 ponds situated on 405 hectares of land, this sanctuary is trying to fight the effects of overfishing and pollution. This pollution comes from the use of agro-chemicals to poison and harvest fish. Although the initial purpose of this conservation fishery will be to breed fish like the Jullien's golden carp simply to preserve them for future generations, the end goal of this project is to make food aquaculture an important economic activity in the region. Since this company is funded by Pelangi Bhd, a Malaysia company that deals with the investment and development of real estate property, the actions of this project can be interpreted as state-building activities instead of conservation based activities. However, while the end goal of this project is to create an industry, this project wants this industry to be sustainable. Thus, this project is advocating that recreational and sport fishing be practiced via the "catch and release" method. This method will attempt to curtail the effects of overfishing that contributed to the Jullien's golden carp's endangerment. Thus, national efforts such as the Vita Tenggarra project may be economically motivated, but their end goal is to create both a sustainable industry and increased environmental policies.

The Mekong River Commission (MRC) is attempting to establish a 10-year suspension on mainstream dams such as the Myitsone Dam in Myanmar and the Xayaburi Dam in Lao PDR. If this commission is established, research will be conducted to see what the long-term cultural, environmental, and economic repercussions of these dams will be. Burma's President Thein Sein admitted on October 1, 2011, that he was establishing this commission and related study due to public pressure both internally and externally. Also as of 2011, the Burmese government has halted usage of the US$3.6 billion Myitsone Dam project in the Irrawaddy River due to environmental concerns. The fact that this dam would displace 63 ethnic Kachin villages from their homes, and that it would flood 296 sq mi (770 km^{2}) are also factors that contributed to the creation of this study and to the decision to suspend the usage of the dam. In relation to the Jullien's golden carp, this flooding would come from the Irrawaddy River, which is one of the homes of the Jullien's golden carp. This flooding would disrupt the migratory habit. However, this commission has not stopped the usage of the US$3.8 billion Xayaburi Dam. This came as a surprise due to its opposition by international environmental groups and some international donors.

== See also ==
- Mekong giant catfish
- Mekong River Commission
- Mekong
- Myitsone Dam
- Xayaburi Dam
