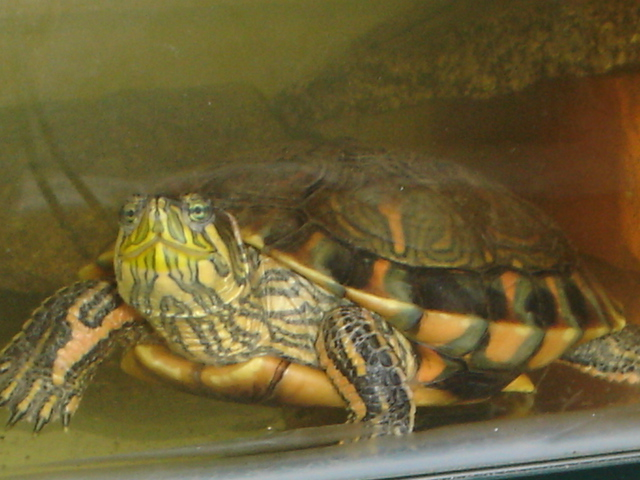

Scientific classification
- Domain: Eukaryota
- Kingdom: Animalia
- Phylum: Chordata
- Class: Reptilia
- Order: Testudines
- Suborder: Cryptodira
- Superfamily: Testudinoidea
- Family: Emydidae
- Genus: Trachemys
- Species: T. dorbigni
- Subspecies: T. d. dorbigni

Trinomial name
- Trachemys dorbigni dorbigni (A.M.C. Duméril & Bibron, 1835)

= Trachemys dorbigni dorbigni =

Southern D'Orbigny's slider

Subspecies of turtle

Trachemys dorbigni dorbigni, also known as the Southern D'Orbigny's slider or simply Orbigny's slider, is a relative of the pond slider.

== Appearance ==
The shell of Orbigny's slider is an elongated oval, up to 26.7 cm in length. Females have a distinct dome. Males have a moderate dome. The general color is a brownish-green shade with markings of red, orange, or yellow on each scute. The skin is also brownish green.

== Habitat ==
Orbigny's slider is found in Brazil, primarily along Rio Guaiba drainage area. It is often found throughout Uruguay and drainages in northeastern Argentina. This species appears to prefer waters with slow to moderate currents.
