= Zulia toad-headed sideneck =

Conservation status
- Vulnerable (IUCN 3.1)

Scientific classification
- Kingdom: Animalia
- Phylum: Chordata
- Class: Reptilia
- Order: Testudines
- Suborder: Pleurodira
- Family: Chelidae
- Genus: Mesoclemmys
- Species: M. zuliae

Binomial name
- Mesoclemmys zuliae (Pritchard & Trebbau, 1984)

Synonyms
- Phrynops (Batrachemys) zuliae Pritchard & Trebbau, 1984; Batrachemys zuliae — Groombridge, 1988; Mesoclemmys zuliae — Bour & Zaher, 2005

Species of turtle

The Zulia toad-headed sideneck (Mesoclemmys zuliae), also known commonly as the Zulia toad-headed turtle, is a species of turtle in the family Chelidae. The species is endemic to Venezuela.

== Etymology ==
The specific name, zuliae, refers to the Venezuelan state of Zulia.

== Geographic range ==
The type locality of M. zuliae is Cano Madre Vieja near El Guayabo, Distrito Colón, Zulia, Venezuela.

== Habitat ==
The preferred natural habitat of M. zuliae is freshwater inland bodies of water.
