= Trachemys dorbigni brasiliensis =

Scientific classification
- Kingdom: Animalia
- Phylum: Chordata
- Class: Reptilia
- Order: Testudines
- Suborder: Cryptodira
- Family: Emydidae
- Genus: Trachemys
- Species: T. dorbigni
- Subspecies: T. d. brasiliensis

Trinomial name
- Trachemys dorbigni brasiliensis (Van Denburgh 1895)

Subspecies of turtle

Trachemys dorbigni brasiliensis, the northern D'Orbigny's slider, is a subspecies of D'Orbigny's slider from Brazil, though validity of this subspecies is disputed. It belongs to the same genus as the pond slider.
