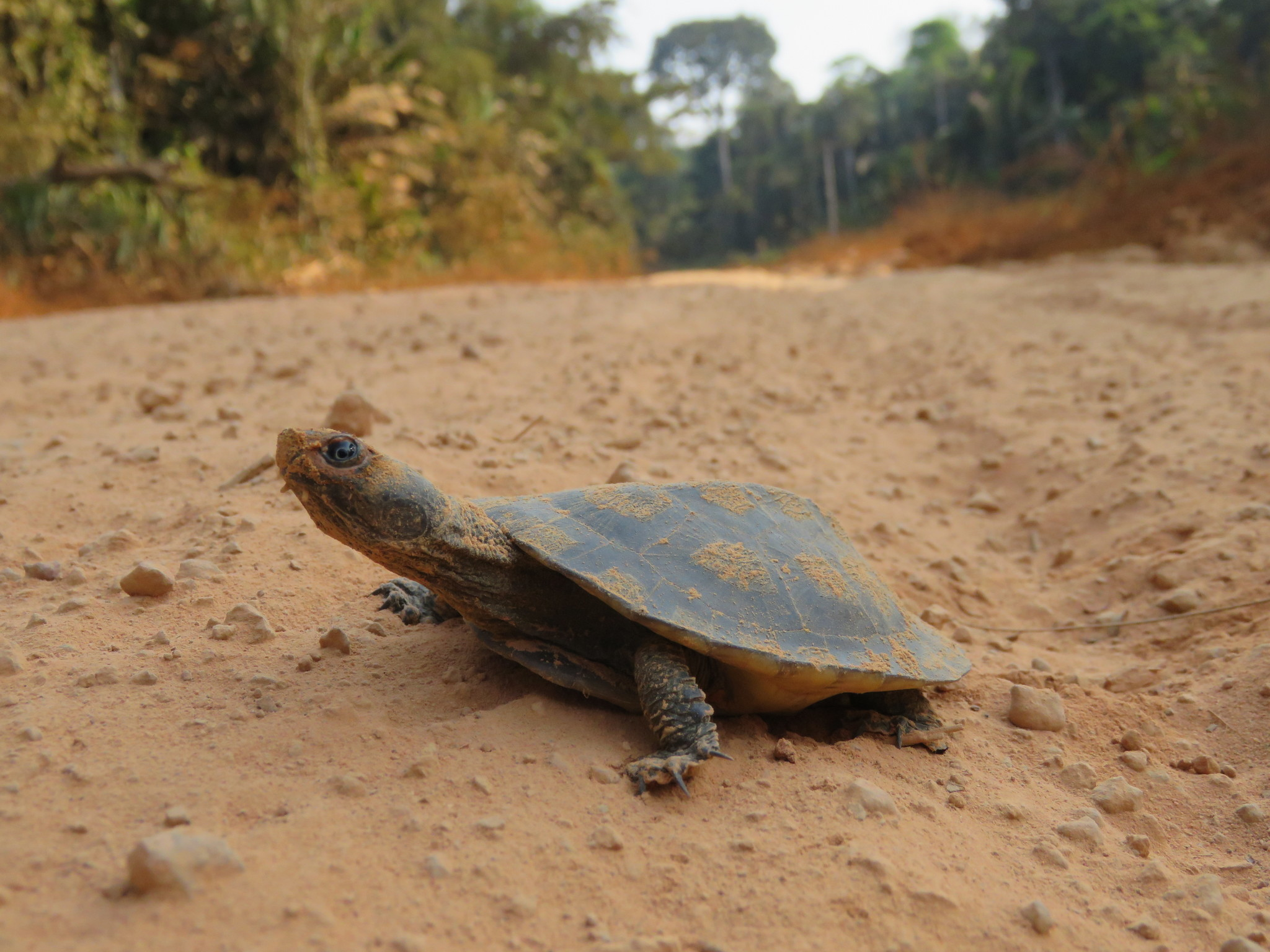
- In Bolivia

Scientific classification
- Domain: Eukaryota
- Kingdom: Animalia
- Phylum: Chordata
- Class: Reptilia
- Order: Testudines
- Suborder: Pleurodira
- Family: Chelidae
- Genus: Mesoclemmys
- Species: M. raniceps

Binomial name
- Mesoclemmys raniceps (Gray, 1856)

Synonyms
- List: Hydraspis raniceps Gray, 1856; Platemys raniceps Strauch, 1862; Phrynops walbaumi Fitzinger, 1904 (nomen nudum); Phrynops wermuthi Mertens, 1969; Phrynops tuberculatus wermuthi Bour, 1973; Phrynops nasuta wermuthi Pritchard, 1979; Phrynops raniceps Bour & Pauler, 1987; Batrachemys raniceps Cabrera, 1998; Batrachemys raniceps raniceps Joseph-Ouni, 2004; Batrachemys raniceps wermuthi Joseph-Ouni, 2004; Mesoclemmys raniceps Bour & Zaher, 2005

= Mesoclemmys raniceps =

Species of turtle

Mesoclemmys raniceps is a side-necked turtle found in the Amazon basin and Orinoco basin.

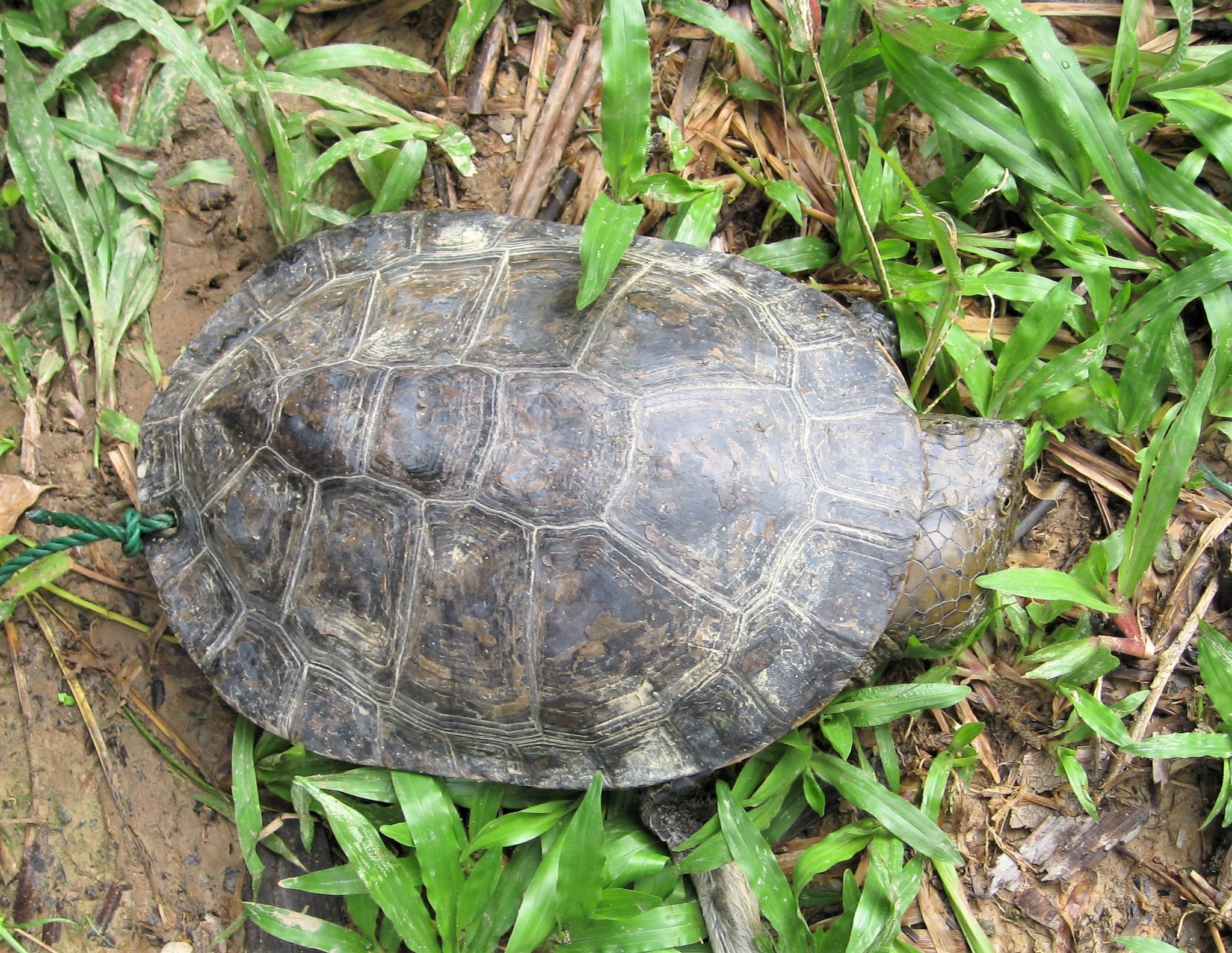
Maynas Province, Peru

Little is known about the turtle's life cycle, but there is evidence that the females can lay a clutch of 4-8 eggs several times in the year. Males are usually smaller than females in length. Males can be distinguished from females by the prominent white scales they have on the external border of their skin which cover the tibia. Mesoclemmys raniceps can be identified by the black stripe on each side of their head which extends from the snout through the eyes and ends at the exterior end, the tympani.
