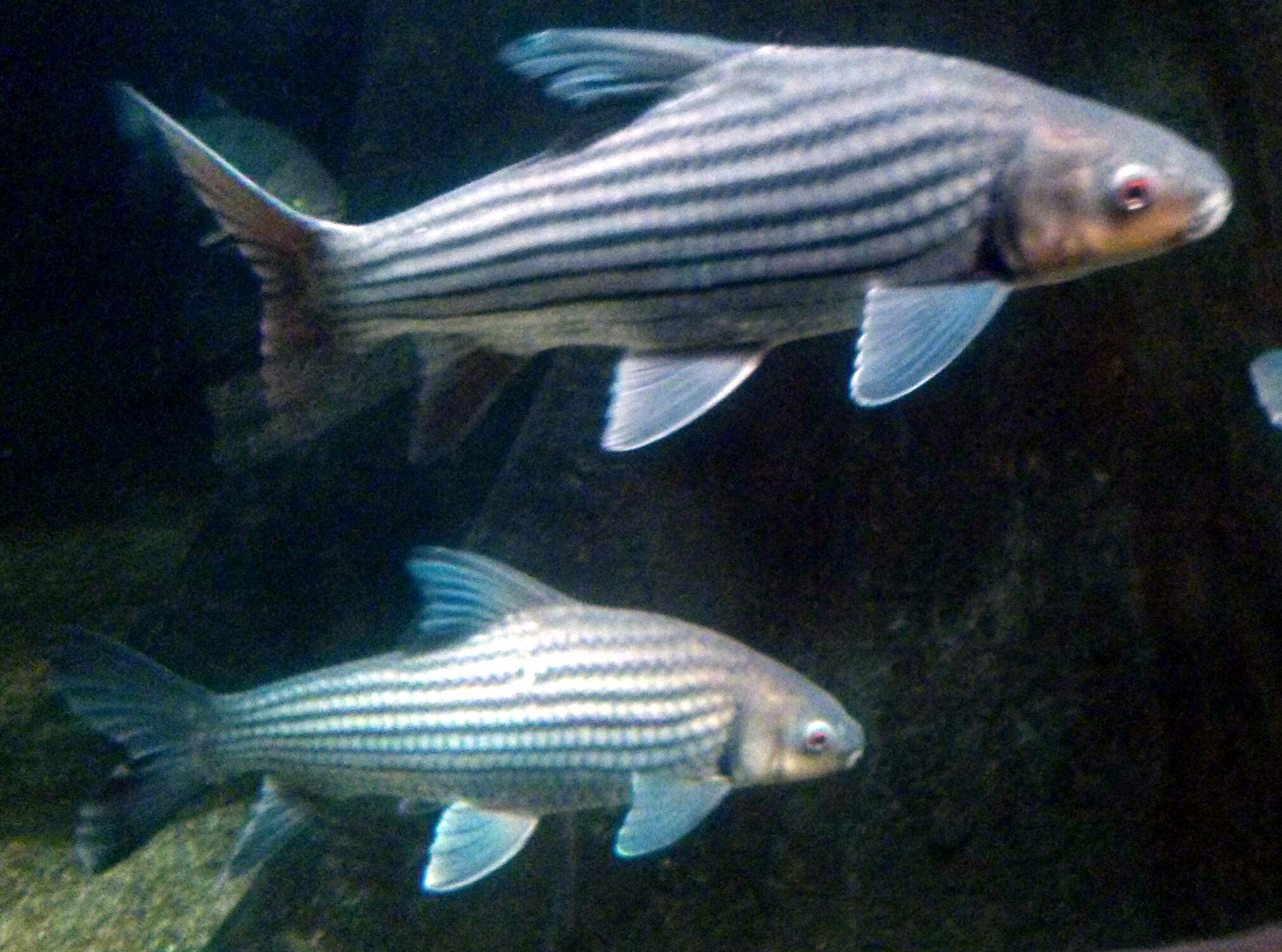
- At Aqua Totto Gifu, Japan

Conservation status
- Endangered (IUCN 3.1)

Scientific classification
- Kingdom: Animalia
- Phylum: Chordata
- Class: Actinopterygii
- Division: Teleostei
- Order: Cypriniformes
- Family: Cyprinidae
- Genus: Probarbus
- Species: P. labeamajor

Binomial name
- Probarbus labeamajor T. R. Roberts, 1992

= Probarbus labeamajor =

Species of fish

Probarbus labeamajor, the thicklip barb, is a species of freshwater ray-finned fish in the family Cyprinidae, the family which includes the carps, barbs, minnows and related fishes. This species is endemic to the Mekong mainstream and large tributaries in Laos, Cambodia and Thailand.
