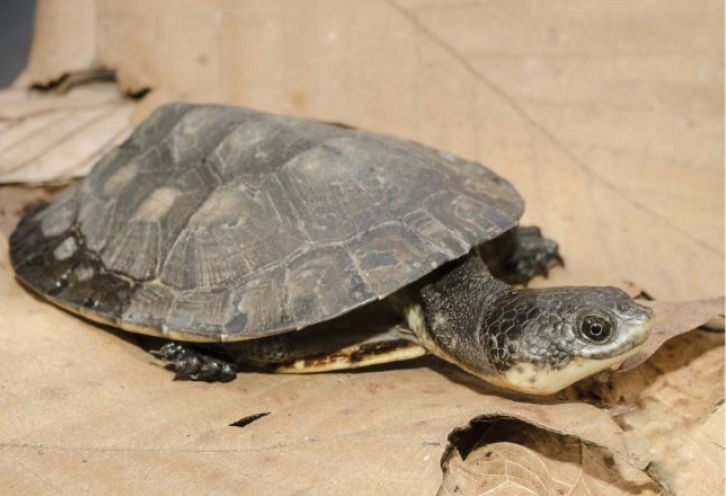
- Mesoclemmys gibba

Conservation status
- Least Concern (IUCN 2.3)

Scientific classification
- Domain: Eukaryota
- Kingdom: Animalia
- Phylum: Chordata
- Class: Reptilia
- Order: Testudines
- Suborder: Pleurodira
- Family: Chelidae
- Genus: Mesoclemmys
- Species: M. gibba

Binomial name
- Mesoclemmys gibba (Schweigger, 1812)

Synonyms
- Species Synonymy: Emys gibba Schweigger, 1812; Emys stenops Spix, 1824; Hydraspis stenops Bell, 1828; Rhinemys gibba Wagler, 1830; Hydraspis cayennensis gibba Gray, 1831; Platemys gibba Duméril & Bibron, 1835; Platemys miliusii Duméril & Bibron, 1835; Hydraspis (Podocnemis) gibba Fitzinger, 1835; Phrynops miliusii Gray, 1844; Phrynops gibbus Diesing, 1850; Hydraspis miliusii Gray, 1856; Hydraspis gordoni Gray, 1868; Hydraspis bicolor Gray, 1873; Mesoclemmys gibba Gray, 1873; Mesoclemys gibba Orcés, 1949; Mesoclemys giba Donoso-Barros, 1956 (ex errore); Phrynops (Mesoclemmys) gibba Medem, 1960; Mesoclemmys gibbus Richard, 1999

= Mesoclemmys gibba =

Species of turtle

Mesoclemmys gibba, known as the toadhead turtle or gibba turtle, is a small side necked turtle found in a wide area of South America, in Peru, Ecuador, Colombia, Venezuela, Trinidad, Guyana, Surinam, Paraguay, and parts of Brazil.
