= Schistura jarutanini =

Conservation status
- Vulnerable (IUCN 3.1)

Scientific classification
- Kingdom: Animalia
- Phylum: Chordata
- Class: Actinopterygii
- Division: Teleostei
- Order: Cypriniformes
- Family: Nemacheilidae
- Genus: Schistura
- Species: S. jarutanini

Binomial name
- Schistura jarutanini Kottelat, 1990

Species of fish

Schistura jarutanini is a species of stone loach that is endemic to Thailand.

The specific name is in honor of Kittipong Jarutanin, a Thai ichthyologist and aquarist who collected the type specimen.

== Distribution ==
This species is endemic to Thailand, specifically to the rivers of Khwae Yai and Khwae Noi which are the major tributaries of the Mae Klong and Kasat rivers which flows south to the Gulf of Thailand and westward to the Adaman Sea respectively. They can be found in creeks and rivers that are small to midsize in range. They are often found in rivers that flow over gravel and cobble.

When this species was originally described, it was thought to be a troglodytic species inhabiting caves. This is because when the specimens used to describe the species were collected, they were collected from an underground stream that was thought to Khwae Yai drainage system in the Mae Klong River basin, western Thailand. It is now known that this species rarely inhabits caves and is instead epigean.

== Description ==
This species grow to an average length of 38.5 mm but their sizes can range from 22.6–62.0 mm. The eye diameter is around 0.45 mm. They have 8 and a half branched dorsal-fin rays and 17 branched caudal-fin rays with 9 upper and 8 lower. They have 5 and a half branched anal-fin rays.

This species lacks red on the fins and a wide light-colored bar just before the base of the caudal fin. The black bar is mostly restricted to the lower half of the caudal-fin base and a black spot on the unbranched rays in the dorsal margin of the caudal fin.

== Taxonomy ==
Schistura jarutanini is a stone loach meaning that it belongs to the family Nemacheilidae. The most closely related species to Schistura jarutanini is Schistura mahnerti.

== Sources ==
Froese, Rainer; Pauly, Daniel (eds.). "Schistura jarutanini". FishBase. December 2012 version.
