= Schistura kaysonei =

Conservation status
- Vulnerable (IUCN 3.1)

Scientific classification
- Kingdom: Animalia
- Phylum: Chordata
- Class: Actinopterygii
- Order: Cypriniformes
- Family: Nemacheilidae
- Genus: Schistura
- Species: S. kaysonei

Binomial name
- Schistura kaysonei Vidthayanon & Jaruthanin, 2002

Species of fish

Schistura kaysonei, the Laotian cave loach, is a species of ray-finned fish in the genus Schistura. It is endemic to Laos where only found in streams in caves. Like other cave-adapted fish, it is blind and has little pigmentation. This troglobitic species has been recorded from only a single cave in a karst landscape in Khammouane Province in Laos. Here it can be found around 100m from the cave entrance and its diet is thought to be organic detritus, such as bat guano, and micro-organisms. It is threatened by a decline in the quality and quantity of the water flowing through the case, caused by deforestation and increased agriculture, as well as potential overfishing for the aquarium trade. The specific name honours Kaysone Phomvihane (1920–1992), who was president of Laos.
