= Burmese narrow-headed softshell turtle =

Conservation status
- Critically Endangered (IUCN 3.1)
- CITES Appendix I

Scientific classification
- Kingdom: Animalia
- Phylum: Chordata
- Class: Reptilia
- Order: Testudines
- Suborder: Cryptodira
- Family: Trionychidae
- Genus: Chitra
- Species: C. vandijki

Binomial name
- Chitra vandijki McCord & Pritchard, 2003

Synonyms
- Chitra burmanica Jaruthanin, 2002 (nomen nudum); Chitra vandijki McCord & Pritchard, 2003

Species of turtle

The Burmese narrow-headed softshell turtle (Chitra vandijki), also known commonly as the Myanmar narrow-headed softshell turtle and Van Dijk's chitra, is a species of turtle in the family Trionychidae. The species is native to Southeast Asia.

== Etymology ==
The specific name, vandijki, is in honor of Dutch herpetologist Peter Paul van Dijk.

== Description ==
Chitra vandijki is one of the largest freshwater turtles in the world, with a straight-line carapace length of at least 1 m (3.3 ft).

== Geographic distribution and habitat ==
Chitra vandijki is found in Myanmar, specifically the Irrawaddy and Chindwin river drainages, and northwestern Thailand. It is possible that it lives in the Sittaung River as well.

== Ecology and behavior ==
Barely anything is known about the ecology of Chitra vandijki in the wild, other than that it is fully aquatic.

== Conservation ==
The conservation status of Chitra vandijki has been evaluated as Critically Endangered by the IUCN, and populations are believed to be declining due to overharvesting for southern Chinese food markets. It is believed that establishing a protected area around parts of the Irrawaddy and Chindwin rivers would help this species, but it has not been done yet. People have also struggled to successfully keep C. vandijki in captivity.

On July 23, 2018, members of the TSA's and WCS's turtle conservation program in Myanmar excavated the nests of female C.vandijki on the banks of the Chindwin River in order to translocate them to a protected hatchery in Linpha Village. The program also incubated eggs from the critically endangered Burmese roofed turtle (Batagur trivittata). 67 individual Burmese narrow-headed softshell turtles from the program hatched on September 30.
