= Mesoclemmys perplexa =

Scientific classification
- Kingdom: Animalia
- Phylum: Chordata
- Class: Reptilia
- Order: Testudines
- Suborder: Pleurodira
- Family: Chelidae
- Genus: Mesoclemmys
- Species: M. perplexa

Binomial name
- Mesoclemmys perplexa Bour & Zaher, 2005

Species of turtle

Mesoclemmys perplexa is a species of turtle from Northeast Brazil.
