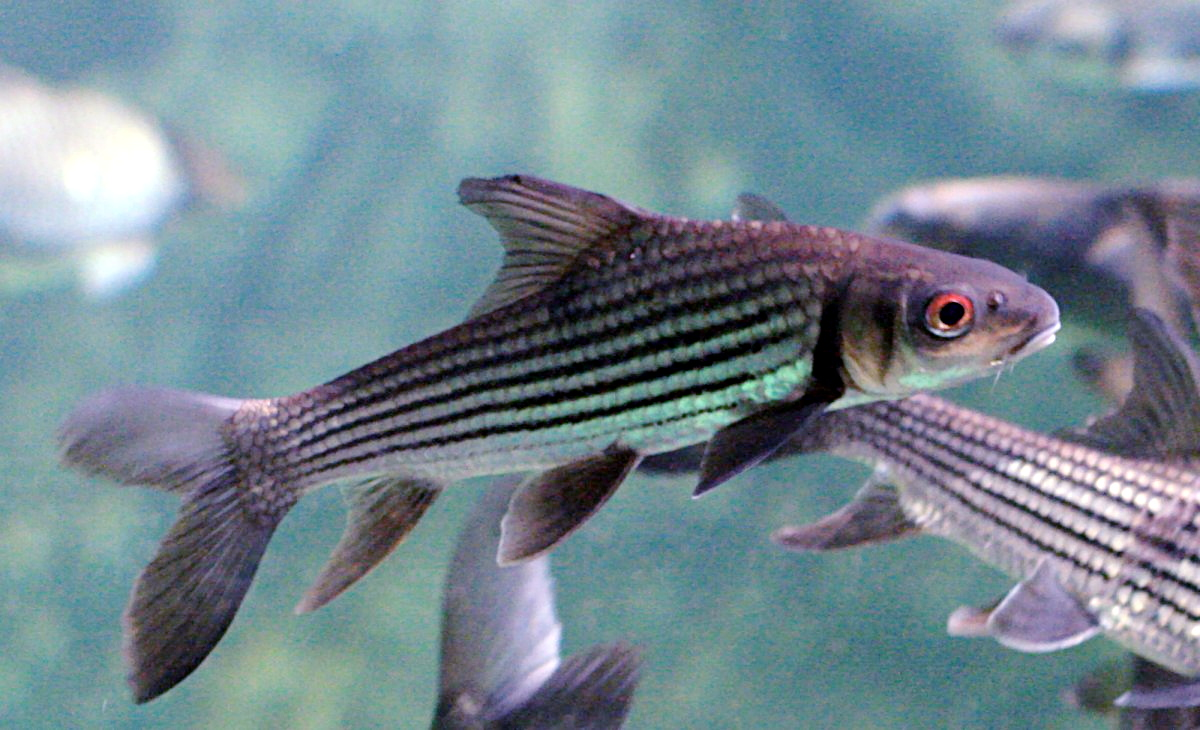
- Probarbus jullieni

Scientific classification
- Domain: Eukaryota
- Kingdom: Animalia
- Phylum: Chordata
- Class: Actinopterygii
- Order: Cypriniformes
- Family: Cyprinidae
- Subfamily: Probarbinae
- Genus: Probarbus; Sauvage, 1880

Type species
- Probarbus jullieni Sauvage, 1880

Species
- See text.

= Probarbus =

Genus of fishes

Probarbus is a genus of cyprinid freshwater fish found in Mainland Southeast Asia, especially the Mekong River. The species in this genus are all large fish that are up to 1.5 m (4.9 ft) in standard length and weigh up to 70 kg (150 lb).

== Species ==
Probarbus contains the following species:

- Probarbus jullieni Sauvage, 1880 (Jullien's golden carp, Isok barb)
- Probarbus labeamajor T. R. Roberts, 1992 (Thicklip barb)
- Probarbus labeaminor T. R. Roberts, 1992 (Thinlip barb)
