= Mesoclemmys nasuta =

Scientific classification
- Domain: Eukaryota
- Kingdom: Animalia
- Phylum: Chordata
- Class: Reptilia
- Order: Testudines
- Suborder: Pleurodira
- Family: Chelidae
- Genus: Mesoclemmys
- Species: M. nasuta

Binomial name
- Mesoclemmys nasuta (Schweigger, 1812)

Synonyms
- Emys nasuta Schweigger, 1812; Emys barbatula Gravenhorst, 1829; Rhinemys nasuta Wagler, 1830; Emys nasua Gray, 1831 (ex errore); Hydraspis barbatula Gray, 1831; Platemys schweiggerii Duméril & Bibron, 1835; Hydraspis (Rhinemys) nasuta Bonaparte, 1836; Platemys nasuta Strauch, 1862; Hydraspis maculata Gray, 1873; Platemys schweiggeri Boulenger, 1889 (ex errore); Phrynops walbaumi Fitzinger, 1904 (nomen nudum); Batrachemys nasuta Stejneger, 1909; Phrynops (Batrachemys) nasuta Zangerl & Medem, 1958; Phrynops nasutus Mertens, 1970; Phrynops nasatus Bour, 1973 (ex errore); Phrynops nasutus nasutus Bour, 1973; Hydraspis macula Lescure & Fretey, 1975 (ex errore); Phrynops nasuta nasuta Pritchard, 1979; Batrachemys nasutus Anan'eva, 1988; Mesoclemmys nasuta Bour & Zaher, 2005

Species of turtle

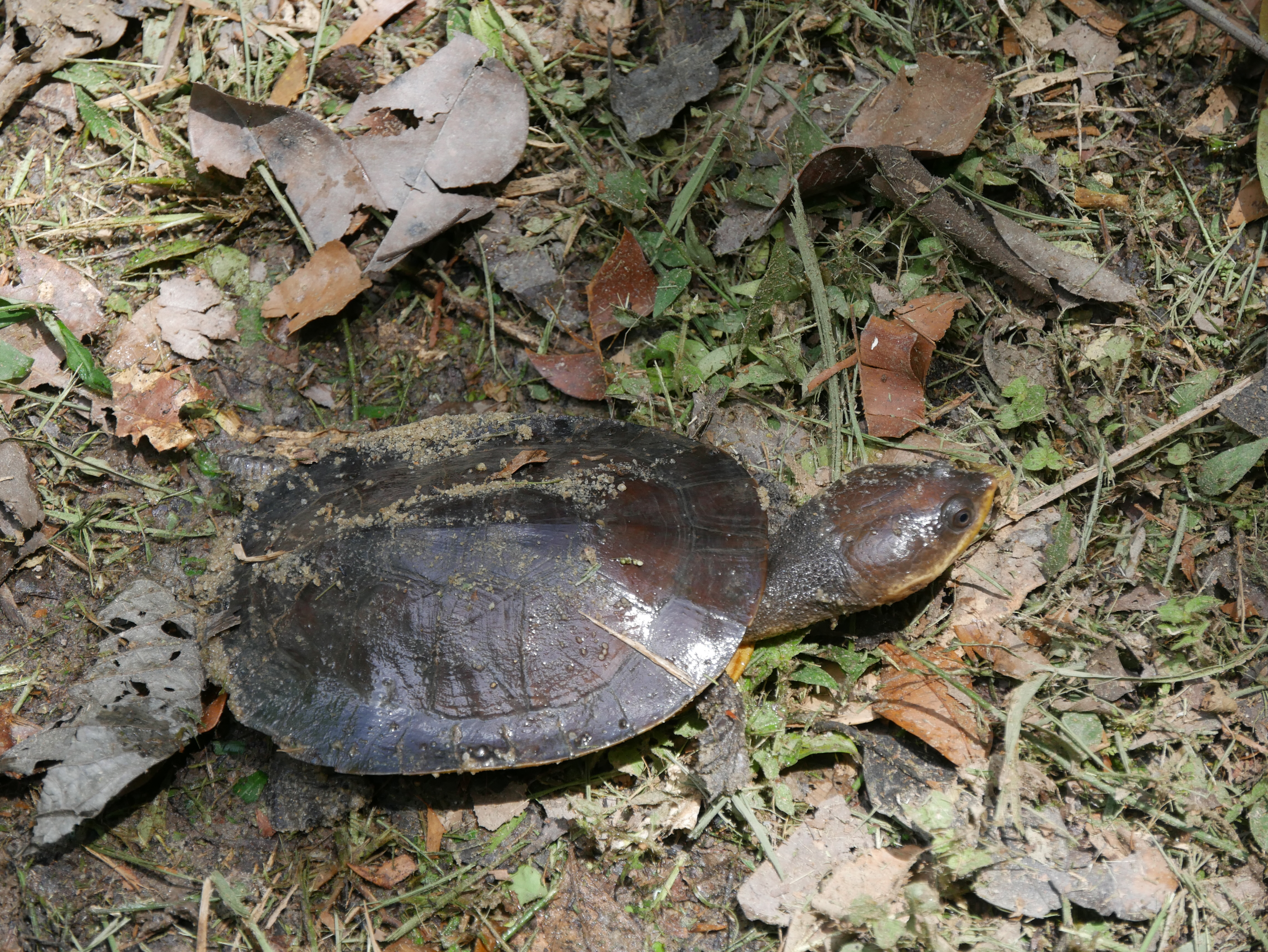

Mesoclemmys nasuta is a species of turtle that lives in Bolivia, Colombia, Peru, Brazil and the Guyanas (north-eastern South America).

A study found that this durophagous species (feeding on hard-shelled animals) had the highest bite force out of 28 species measured, at 432 N (97 lbf).
