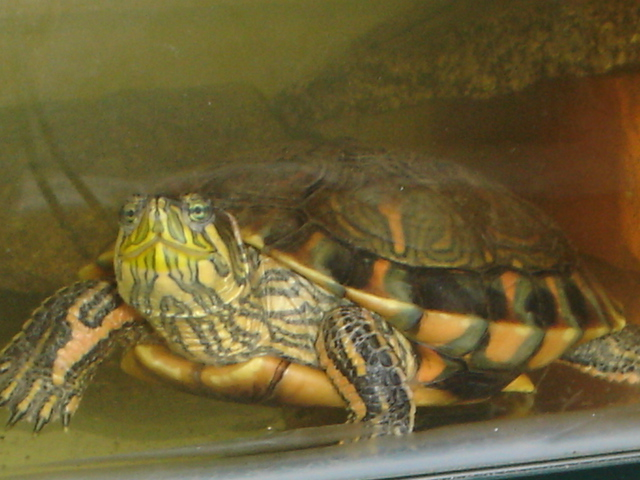
- Trachemys dorbigni

Scientific classification
- Kingdom: Animalia
- Phylum: Chordata
- Class: Reptilia
- Order: Testudines
- Suborder: Cryptodira
- Family: Emydidae
- Genus: Trachemys
- Species: T. dorbigni

Binomial name
- Trachemys dorbigni (A.M.C. Duméril & Bibron, 1835)

Subspecies
- Trachemys dorbigni brasiliensis; Trachemys dorbigni dorbigni

Synonyms
- Emys dorbigni Duméril & Bibron, 1835; Clemmys (Rhinoclemmys) orbignyi Fitzinger, 1835; Emys dorbignii Gray, 1844 (ex errore); Emys orbignyi — d'Orbignyi & Bibron, 1847; Clemmys dorbignii — Strauch, 1862; Clemmys dorbignyi — Boulenger, 1886; Chrysemys dorbignyi — Boulenger, 1889; Emys dorbignyi — Siebenrock, 1909; Pseudemys dorbigni — Mertens, Müller & Rust, 1934; Chrysemys (Trachemys) dorbigni — McDowell, 1964; Pseudemys dorbignyi — Pritchard, 1967; Pseudemys dorbignyi brasiliensis Freiberg, 1969; Pseudemys dorbignyi dorbignyi — Freiberg, 1969; Pseudemys scripta dorbigni — Moll & Legler, 1971; Pseudemys dorbigni brasiliensis — Wermuth & Mertens, 1977; Pseudemys dorbigni dorbigni — Wermuth & Mertens, 1977; Pseudemys dorbigny Moll, 1979 (ex errore); Pseudemys scripta dorbignyi — Pritchard, 1979; Pseudemys scripta brasiliensis — Smith & Smith, 1980; Chrysemys scripta dorbignyi — Mittermeier, Medem & Rhodin, 1980; Chrysemys dorbigni brasiliensis — Freiberg, 1981; Chrysemys dorbigni dorbigni — Freiberg, 1981; Chrysemys scripta brasiliensis — Obst, 1983; Chrysemys scripta dorbigni — Obst, 1983; Trachemys scripta brasiliensis — Iverson, 1985; Trachemys scripta dorbigni — Iverson, 1985; Trachemys scripta dorbignyi — Waller & Chebez, 1987; Trachemys dorbignyi — Alderton, 1988; Trachemys dorbigni — Waller, 1988; Trachemys dorbigni brasiliensis — Ernst & Barbour, 1989; Trachemys dorbigni dorbigni — Ernst & Barbour, 1989; Trachemys dorbignii brasiliensis — Bour, 2003; Trachemys dorbignii dorbignii — Bour, 2003; Trachemys dorbigny — Fabius, 2004

= D'Orbigny's slider =

Species of turtle

D'Orbigny's slider (Trachemys dorbigni) also commonly known as the black-bellied slider, and in Brazil as tartaruga-tigre or tartaruga-tigre-d'água (which mean "tiger turtle" and "water tiger turtle" in Portuguese), is a species of water turtle in the family Emydidae. The species is found in southern Brazil, northeastern Argentina, and Uruguay.

== Etymology ==
The specific name, dorbigni, is in honor of French naturalist Alcide d'Orbigny.

== Habitat ==
Trachemys dorbigni is usually found in bodies of water such as lakes, marshes, streams and rivers. It has a preference for waters with low or moderate currents, soft bottoms and abundant aquatic vegetation.

== Description ==
The gender of Trachemys dorbigni can be determined by the form of the plastron, which after a few years of life, shows differences between male and female. The males has a penis that is located in the tail and becomes apparent only during the mating season when it is inserted into the female's cloaca. D'Orbigny's slider has a life span of between 30 and 100 years in captivity.

Hatchlings weigh 11 grams (0.39 oz) with a 3.5 cm (1.4 in) carapace. The average growth rate is about 3 cm (1.2 in) per year in the wild, but in captivity it can grow faster being able to grow over 9 cm (3.5 in) in a year. The female can grow up to 30 cm (12 in) straight-line carapace length and weigh over 2.7 kg (6.0 lb), while the male can only grow to 25 cm (9.8 in). When the male reaches sexual maturity (after 2 years), it acquires a dark color, while the female keeps the same green after maturity (at 5 years).

=== Sexual dimorphism ===
The sex identification is only possible when adult, at 5 or 6 years. The female is bigger and may reach 30 cm (12 in) in length and has the plastron (bottom shell) slightly convex so as to provide more space for eggs. The male reaches 20–25 cm (7.9–9.8 in) and has a longer and bulkier tail. Furthermore, the male plastron is straight or slightly concave to fit better upon females when mating.

The male's cloaca is located 2/3 the distance between the tail beginning and the shell, while the female is very close to the shell.

== Reproduction ==
The female Trachemys dorbigni produces an average of 10 eggs per buried nest; usually it buries two nests per season. Incubation ranges from 2 to 4 months. The eggs are laid under approximately 10 cm (3.9 in) of sand. The eggs are white-colored. Each egg on average measures 39.3 mm (1.55 in) in length and 25.8 mm (1.02 in) in width, weighing on average 14.9 g (0.53 oz).

Only 31% of the female population lays eggs each year.

The sex of baby turtles is determined by the temperature of the sand during incubation, lower temperatures increase the number of females.

== Diseases ==
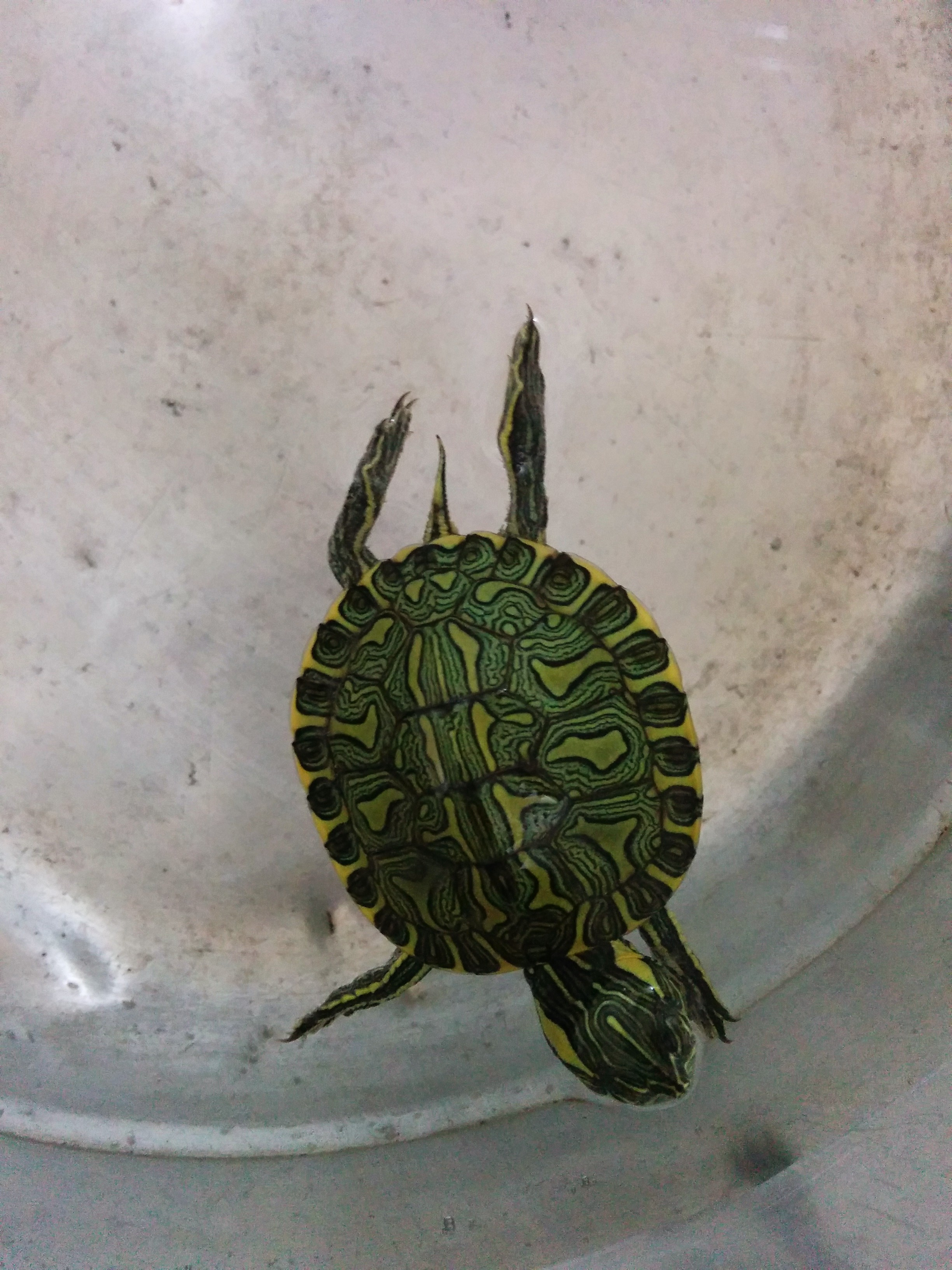
Baby D'Orbigny slider with pneumonia

Trachemys dorbigni is susceptible to diseases such as pneumonia, dystocia, bone decalcification, vitamin deficiency, gastroenteritis, and prolapses.

Pet owners must avoid using small objects as decoration in its tank, because it tends to eat everything it can. Ingesting small objects, such as pebbles and plastic decorations, may lead to gut impaction, which is very likely to require surgical intervention.

Despite being very hardy, it may have rachitis, a disease that makes the shell soft due to protein deficiency. This condition may be corrected by adding protein to meals, especially fish.

Placing the turtle on abrasive surfaces can also cause injuries to the plastron, and such injuries can provide an entrance point for fungi and bacteria.

Allowing the animal to maintain its body temperature around an optimal point, between 28 and 34 degrees Celsius (82 and 93 degrees Fahrenheit), is a necessity. Providing the turtle with daily sun light or special UV light so that it can properly metabolize vitamin D will avoid metabolic issues.

== Diet ==
An omnivorous turtle, Trachemys dorbigni can eat almost anything in nature such as shrimps, vegetables, fruit, carrion, small fishes, snails, and worms.

During the first two years of life this turtle is mainly carnivorous, eating small animals and carrion, but then it switches to being mainly vegetarian, eating more vegetables and algae then meat.

== Diet in captivity ==
For pet keepers it is recommended that you feed Trachemys dorbigni more than once every day in the first two-years, then shift to feeding once every two days.

== Protection ==
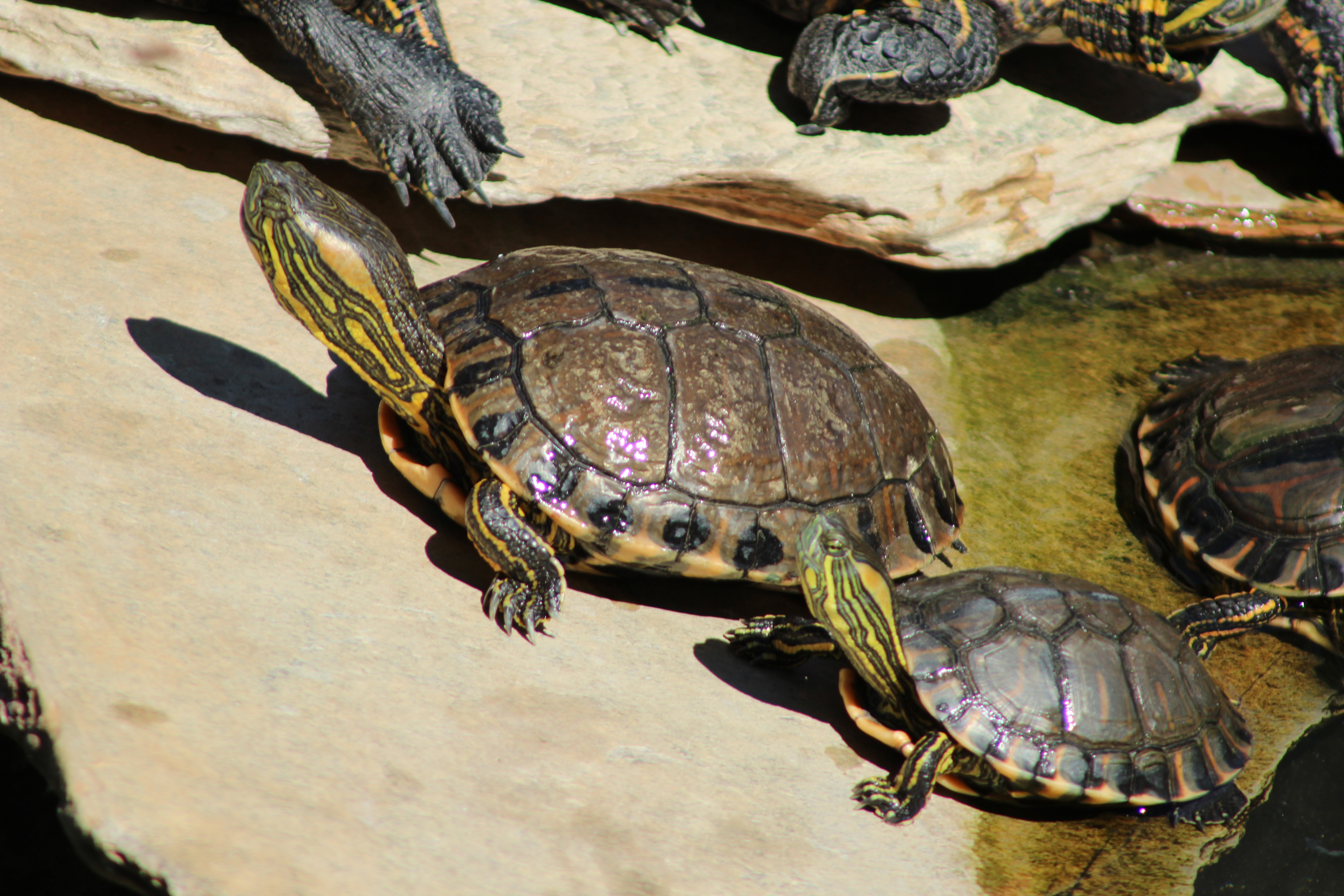
D' Orbigny's slider in Uruguay

=== Brazil ===
In Brazil the species Trachemys dorbigni can be owned only with specific documentation. The purchase invoice must contain the popular and scientific name, and designate the number of animals. Also required is a certificate of origin, invoice number, and the number of commercial breeding of wildlife as recorded in the Brazilian IBAMA.

It is forbidden to release the T. dorbigni in nature, and doing so is subject to the penalties provided in laws No. 6.938/81 and No. 9.605/98.

If the owner can no longer keep it, the store that made the sale is obliged to take the animal back, and the animal will be shipped back to the only farm allowed to breed them in Brazil.

=== Uruguay ===
In Uruguay T. dorbigni can only be owned with specific documentation and, as it is a protected species, commercialization is forbidden.
