= Probarbus labeaminor =

Conservation status
- Near Threatened (IUCN 3.1)

Scientific classification
- Kingdom: Animalia
- Phylum: Chordata
- Class: Actinopterygii
- Order: Cypriniformes
- Family: Cyprinidae
- Genus: Probarbus
- Species: P. labeaminor

Binomial name
- Probarbus labeaminor T. R. Roberts, 1992

Species of fish

Probarbus labeaminor, the thinlip barb, is a species of freshwater ray-finned fish in the family Cyprinidae, which includes the carps, barbs, minnows and related fishes. The thinlip barb is endemic to the Mekong in Laos, Thailand and Cambodia. It occurs between the Mun River and Nakhon Phanom in Thailand in the mainstream of the Mekong, and may also be found in the larger tributaries.
