= Peter Pritchard =

English-born American zoologist (1943–2020)

Dr. Peter Pritchard
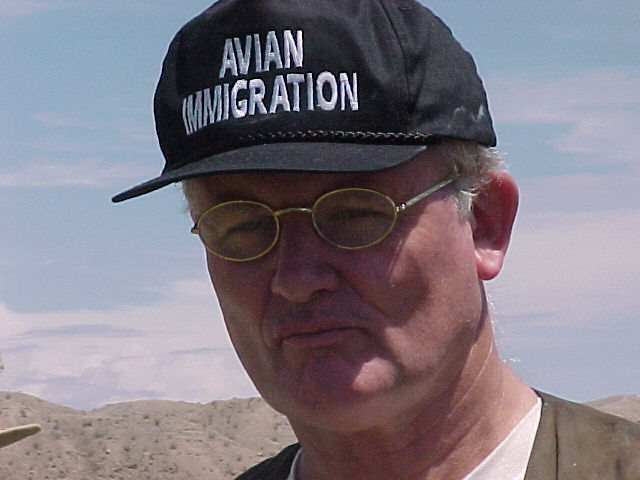
- Born: June 26, 1943; England
- Died: February 25, 2020 (aged 76)
- Education: University of Florida; Oxford University
- Known for: Work for the Conservation of turtles
- Scientific career
- Fields: Zoology
- Workplaces: Chelonian Research Institute

Peter Charles Howard Pritchard (June 26, 1943 – February 25, 2020) was a leading turtle zoologist. Pritchard was educated at Oxford University and the University of Florida, where he received a Ph.D. and specialized in Zoology. He was most commonly known for his career of almost 40 years for the conservation of turtles.

He worked with the World Wildlife Fund, spending four years there before joining Audubon Florida in 1973 as assistant executive director, senior vice president and acting president. In 1997, he founded a turtle conservation organization called the Chelonian Research Institute in Oviedo, Florida. Scott A. Thomson, curator of the Chelonian Research Institute notes that the CRI has 14500 tortoise and turtle specimens registered with some 2000 unregistered specimens. The collection comprises 100% of all turtle genera, 86% of all species and 72% of all subspecies – the third largest and most complete collection in the world.

Pritchard also travelled to Guyana for his career, the South American country that is home to four of the world's seven known sea turtle species: the leatherback, green, hawksbill and the olive ridley. He also named several species of turtle for example Mesoclemmys zuliae and Chitra vandijki. He also worked with the Lokono during his turtle conservation experience in Guyana.

Along the way, Pritchard's own scholarship has benefited from centuries' worth of tribal turtle knowledge. He has also done extensive study and written books about alligator snapping turtles and Galapagos tortoises.

Pritchard died on February 25, 2020.

== Eponyms ==
Pritchard is honored in the scientific names of three turtles, Podocnemis pritchardi †, Chelodina pritchardi and Mauremys pritchardi.
