= Ignatiana =

Ignatiana may refer to:

- a Syriac version of the Bible
- a variant of the given name Tatyana
- a taxonomic synonym of the plant genus Strychnos

== Species Latin names ==
- Ignatiana philippinica, Loureiro, a synonym for Strychnos ignatia, a bean tree native to the Philippines and parts of China
- Amphisbaena ignatiana, Vanzolini, 1991, a worm lizard species in the genus Amphisbaena found in Brazil
