= A. leucocephala =

A. leucocephala may refer to:

- Amazona leucocephala, a medium-sized green parrot
- Amphisbaena leucocephala, Peters, 1878, a worm lizard species in the genus Amphisbaena
- Armeria leucocephala, a flowering plant species in the genus Armeria
- Arundinicola leucocephala, a small passerine bird in the tyrant flycatcher family

== See also ==
- Leucocephala (disambiguation)
