= Munoai =

Munoai may refer to:

- Amphisbaena munoai, Klappenbach, 1966, a worm lizard species in the genus Amphisbaena found in Brazil
- Leptotyphlops munoai, a blind snake species

== Subspecies ==
- Leopardus braccatus munoai, Ximenez, 1961, a subspecies of the Pantanal cat, a small feline of Brazil, Paraguay, and Uruguay
