= Amphisbaena albocingulata =

Conservation status
- Least Concern (IUCN 3.1)

Scientific classification
- Kingdom: Animalia
- Phylum: Chordata
- Class: Reptilia
- Order: Squamata
- Clade: Amphisbaenia
- Family: Amphisbaenidae
- Genus: Amphisbaena
- Species: A. albocingulata

Binomial name
- Amphisbaena albocingulata Boettger, 1885

Species of lizard

Amphisbaena albocingulata is a worm lizard species in the family Amphisbaenidae. It is endemic to Paraguay. It is light brown in coloration, distinguishable from other lizards in the genus by a rounded snout and visible caudal autotomy.

== Taxonomy ==
Amphisbaena albocingulata was formally described in 1885 by the German zoologist Oskar Boettger based on a specimen collected from Paraguay. Boettger indicated the holotype of albocingulata could possibly be a juvenile of Amphisbaena darwini, with which George Boulenger had synonymized Aporarchus prunicolor, but treated it as a distinct species because of differences in the head scalation. In 1966, in his taxonomic revision of the Amphisbaena darwini species complex, the American zoologist Carl Gans revived Amphisbaena prunicolor as a full species and demoted A. albocingulata to the status of a subspecies. The Brazilian herpetologist Paulo Vanzolini raised albocingulata to the status of a full species again in 2002. This arrangement has been maintained by subsequent authorities. Its specific epithet is derived from the Latin words albus and cingulata, meaning 'white-belted'.

== Description ==
Amphisbaena albocingulata is a small, thin species for its genus, reaching a snout–vent length of 121.0–138.0 mm (4.76–5.43 in). It is a unicolor light brown in color, with a slightly darker tail. It can be distinguished from other lizards in the genus by a rounded snout and visible caudal autotomy.

== Distribution and habitat ==
Amphisbaena albocingulata is endemic to Paraguay, where it is known from the departments of Central, Asunción, and Paraguarí. A specimen of the species from Brasília in Brazil is of uncertain provenance and may be mislabelled, while a record from Argentina was a misidentified Amphisbaena heterozonata.
