= Helmeted worm lizard =

Helmeted worm lizard is a common name for some amphisbaenian species

Helmeted worm lizard may refer to:

- Amphisbaena acangaoba, native to Brazil
- Monopeltis galeata, native to Central Africa
