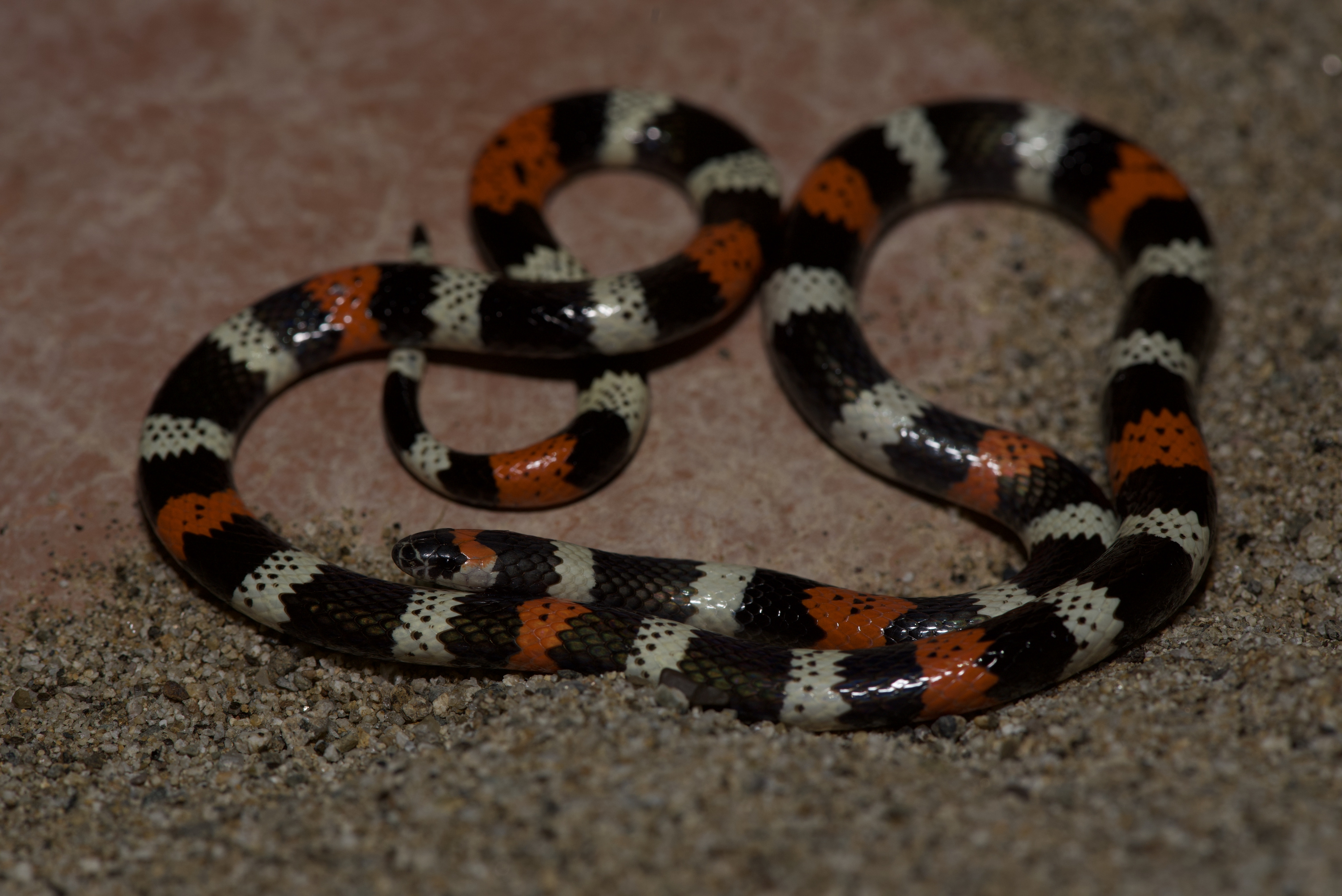
- Micrurus tschudii olssoni from Northern Peru

Conservation status
- Least Concern (IUCN 3.1)

Scientific classification
- Kingdom: Animalia
- Phylum: Chordata
- Class: Reptilia
- Order: Squamata
- Suborder: Serpentes
- Family: Elapidae
- Genus: Micrurus
- Species: M. tschudii

Binomial name
- Micrurus tschudii (Jan, 1858)
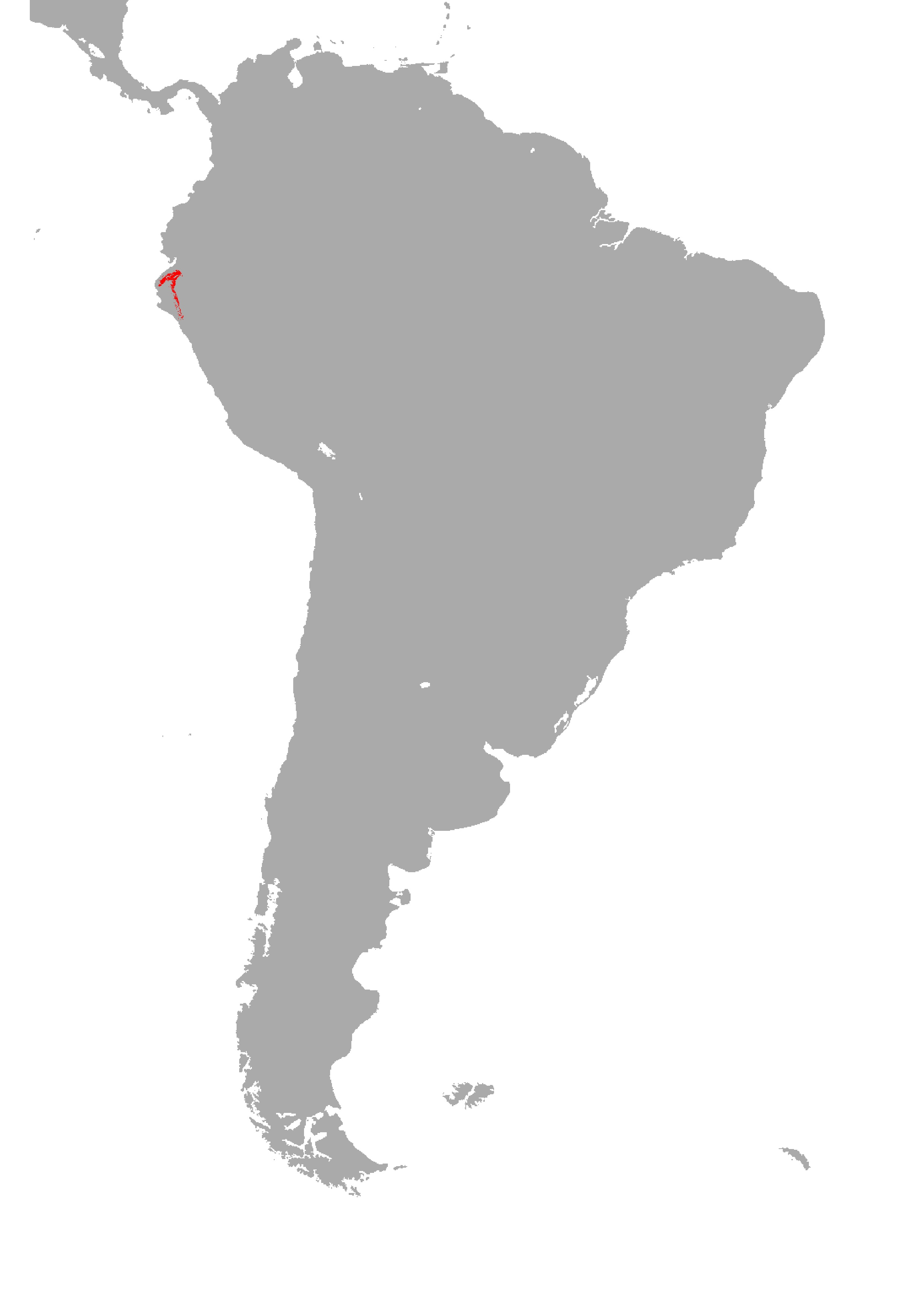

Synonyms
- Elaps tschudii Jan, 1858

= Micrurus tschudii =

Species of snake

Micrurus tschudii, also known commonly as the desert coral snake and coral del desierto in South American Spanish, is a species of venomous snake in the family Elapidae. The species is native to extreme western South America. There are two recognised subspecies.

== Geographic distribution ==
Micrurus tschudii is found on Pacific slopes in Ecuador and Peru.

== Etymology ==
The species Micrurus tschudii is named in honour of Johann Jakob von Tschudi.

The subspecies Micrurus tschudii olssoni is named in honour of American palaeontologist Axel A. Olsson of the Field Museum of Natural History, who collected the holotype.

== Subspecies ==
Two subspecies are recognised as being valid, including the nominotypical subspecies.

- Micrurus tschudii olssoni K. Schmidt & F. Schmidt, 1925 – northern desert coral snake, coral norteña del desierto – southern Ecuador, northwestern Peru
- Micrurus tschudii tschudii (Jan, 1858) – southern desert coral snake, coral sureña del desierto – western Peru

== Description ==
Micrurus tschudii is fairly small for its genus, with adults usually growing to a total length (tail included) of 45–55 cm (18–22 in). The maximum recorded total length is 73 cm (29 in).

Like many New World coral snakes, the colour pattern consists of red, white (or yellow), and black rings, with the black rings arranged in triads. The head is black, with a red crossband on the frontal and parietal scales, which is followed by the first black ring of the first triad. All of the triads are complete, continuing onto the tail. Some of the dorsal scales included in the red and white rings are tipped with black.

The two subspecies differ in scalation as follows.

- M. t. tschudii: Males have 188–213 ventrals and 27–33 subcaudals, and females have 206–224 ventrals and 25–31 subcaudals.
- M.t. olssoni: Males have 187–203 ventrals and 24–30 subcaudals, and females have 197–209 ventrals and 25–29 subcaudals.

== Habitat ==
The preferred natural habitats of Micrurus tschudii are forest and shrubland, in dry valleys, at elevations from near sea level to 1,500 m (4,900 ft).

== Behaviour ==
Micrurus tschudii is terrestrial.

== Diet ==
Micrurus tschudii is known to prey on amphisbaenians such as Amphisbaena occidentalis, lizards such as geckos of the genus Phyllodactylus, and colubrid snakes.
