= Amphisbaena maranhensis =

Scientific classification
- Domain: Eukaryota
- Kingdom: Animalia
- Phylum: Chordata
- Class: Reptilia
- Order: Squamata
- Clade: Amphisbaenia
- Family: Amphisbaenidae
- Genus: Amphisbaena
- Species: A. maranhensis

Binomial name
- Amphisbaena maranhensis Gomes & Maciel, 2012

Species of reptile

Amphisbaena maranhensis is a species of worm lizard found in Brazil in the state of Maranhão. The species name is a reference to the state in which it is found

This species was discovered in 2012 and is only known to exist in Loreto, Maranhão.
