= A. arenaria =

A. arenaria may refer to:

An abbreviation of a species name. In binomial nomenclature the name of a species is always the name of the genus to which the species belongs, followed by the species name (also called the species epithet). In A. arenaria the genus name has been abbreviated to A. and the species has been spelled out in full. In a document that uses this abbreviation it should always be clear from the context which genus name has been abbreviated.

Some of the most common uses of A. arenaria are:

- Ammophila arenaria, the European marram grass or European beachgrass, a grass species native to the coastlines of Europe and North Africa
- Amphisbaena arenaria, a worm lizard species found in Brazil

== See also ==
- Arenaria (disambiguation)
