= Amphisbaena absaberi =

Conservation status
- Data Deficient (IUCN 3.1)

Scientific classification
- Kingdom: Animalia
- Phylum: Chordata
- Class: Reptilia
- Order: Squamata
- Clade: Amphisbaenia
- Family: Amphisbaenidae
- Genus: Amphisbaena
- Species: A. absaberi

Binomial name
- Amphisbaena absaberi (Strüssmann & Carvalho, 2001)
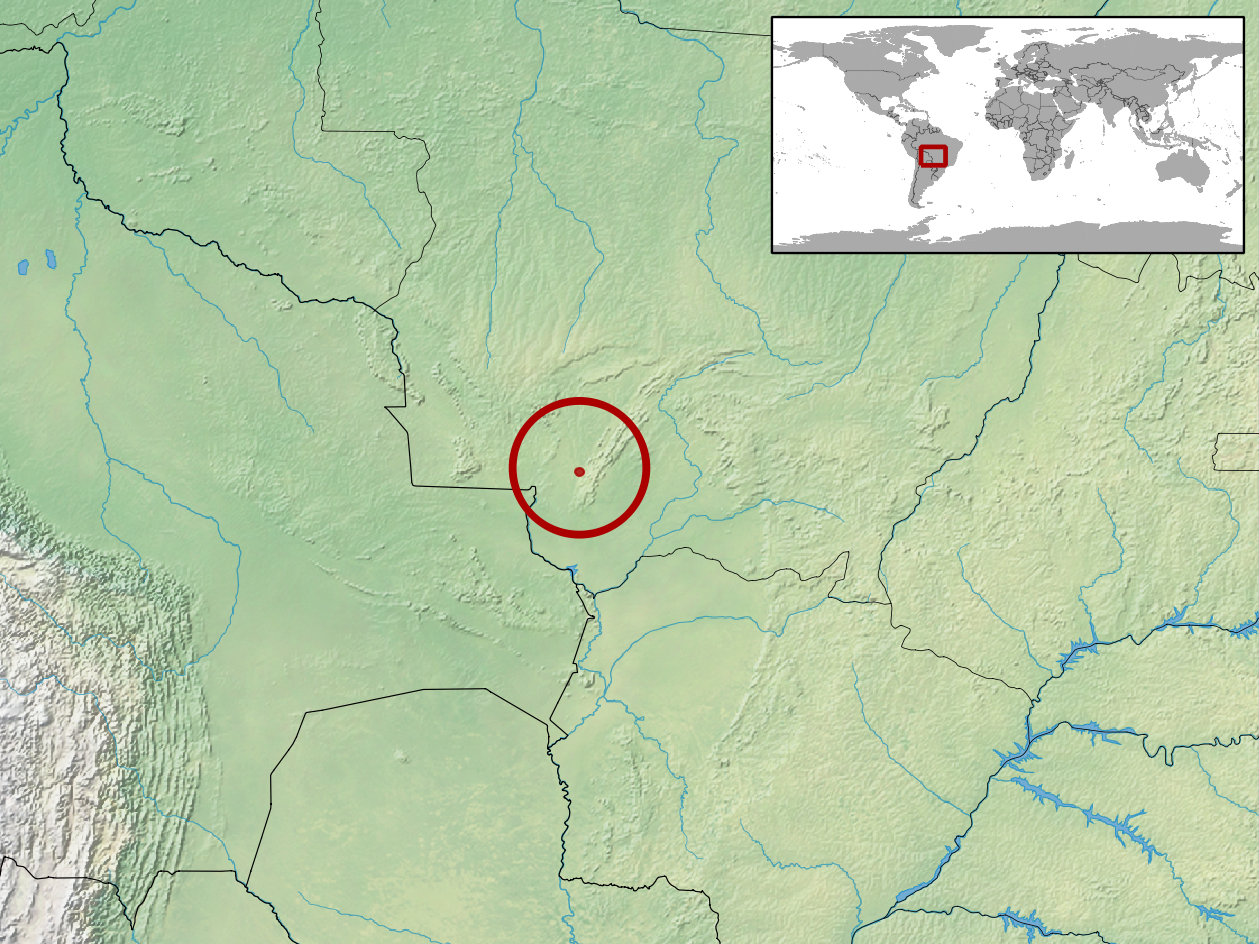

Species of lizard

Amphisbaena absaberi is a worm lizard species in the family Amphisbaenidae. It is endemic to Brazil, and is known only from its type location.

== Etymology ==
Amphisbaena absaberi is named in honor of Brazilian geographer Aziz Nacib Ab'Sáber.

== Taxonomy ==
The holotype of this species was collected on 15 January 1993 in Cáceres, Brazil, in a cerradão area disturbed by bulldozer activity. Originally classified as Cerclophia absaberi, it was transferred to genus Amphisbaena in 2009 following the completion of a phylogenetic study.

== Description ==
Amphisbaena absaberi has a snout-vent length (SVL) of approximately 300mm and a mass of up to 22g, with males slightly larger than females. Total body length is up to 325mm. The holotype is light brown on its dorsal surface with its tail a conspicuously darker shade of brown. The tail itself is rounded and compressed. It has 239-242 body annuli and two precloacal pores. Its head is compressed relative to other members of its genus, and it has a distinct dorsal sulcus and a segmented caudal keel.

== Ecology ==
What little is known of the ecology of Amphisbaena absaberi is inferred from its holotype and paratypes. Like many others of its genus, Amphisbaena absaberi is fossorial and is likely insectivorous.
