= Barbour's worm lizard =

Scientific classification
- Kingdom: Animalia
- Phylum: Chordata
- Class: Reptilia
- Order: Squamata
- Clade: Amphisbaenia
- Family: Amphisbaenidae
- Genus: Amphisbaena
- Species: A. anomala

Binomial name
- Amphisbaena anomala Barbour, 1914

Species of lizard

Barbour's worm lizard (Amphisbaena anomala) is a worm lizard species in the family Amphisbaenidae. It is endemic to Brazil.
