= Gonâve worm lizard =

Conservation status
- Critically Endangered (IUCN 3.1)

Scientific classification
- Kingdom: Animalia
- Phylum: Chordata
- Class: Reptilia
- Order: Squamata
- Clade: Amphisbaenia
- Family: Amphisbaenidae
- Genus: Amphisbaena
- Species: A. gonavensis

Binomial name
- Amphisbaena gonavensis Gans & Alexander, 1962

Species of lizard

The Gonâve worm lizard (Amphisbaena gonavensis) is a worm lizard species in the family Amphisbaenidae. It is endemic to Gonâve Island.
