= Innocent worm lizard =

Conservation status
- Vulnerable (IUCN 3.1)

Scientific classification
- Kingdom: Animalia
- Phylum: Chordata
- Class: Reptilia
- Order: Squamata
- Clade: Amphisbaenia
- Family: Amphisbaenidae
- Genus: Amphisbaena
- Species: A. innocens

Binomial name
- Amphisbaena innocens Weinland, 1862

Species of lizard

The innocent worm lizard (Amphisbaena innocens) is a worm lizard species in the family Amphisbaenidae. It is endemic to Hispaniola.
