= Amphisbaena hoogmoedi =

Scientific classification
- Kingdom: Animalia
- Phylum: Chordata
- Class: Reptilia
- Order: Squamata
- Clade: Amphisbaenia
- Family: Amphisbaenidae
- Genus: Amphisbaena
- Species: A. hoogmoedi

Binomial name
- Amphisbaena hoogmoedi Oliveira, Vaz-Silva, Santos, Graboski, Teixeira, Dal Vechio & Ribeiro, 2018

Species of lizard

Amphisbaena hoogmoedi is a species of worm lizard in the family Amphisbaenidae. The species is endemic to Brazil.

== Etymology ==
The specific name, hoogmoedi, is in honor of Dutch herpetologist Marinus Steven Hoogmoed.

== Geographic range ==
A. hoogmoedi is found in the state of Pará, Brazil.

== Description ==
Medium-sized for an amphisbaenid, the maximum recorded snout-to-vent length (SVL) for A. hoogmoedi is 29.1 cm (11.5 in).
