= Amphisbaena lumbricalis =

Conservation status
- Endangered (IUCN 3.1)

Scientific classification
- Kingdom: Animalia
- Phylum: Chordata
- Class: Reptilia
- Order: Squamata
- Suborder: Lacertoidea
- Clade: Amphisbaenia
- Family: Amphisbaenidae
- Genus: Amphisbaena
- Species: A. lumbricalis

Binomial name
- Amphisbaena lumbricalis Vanzolini, 1996
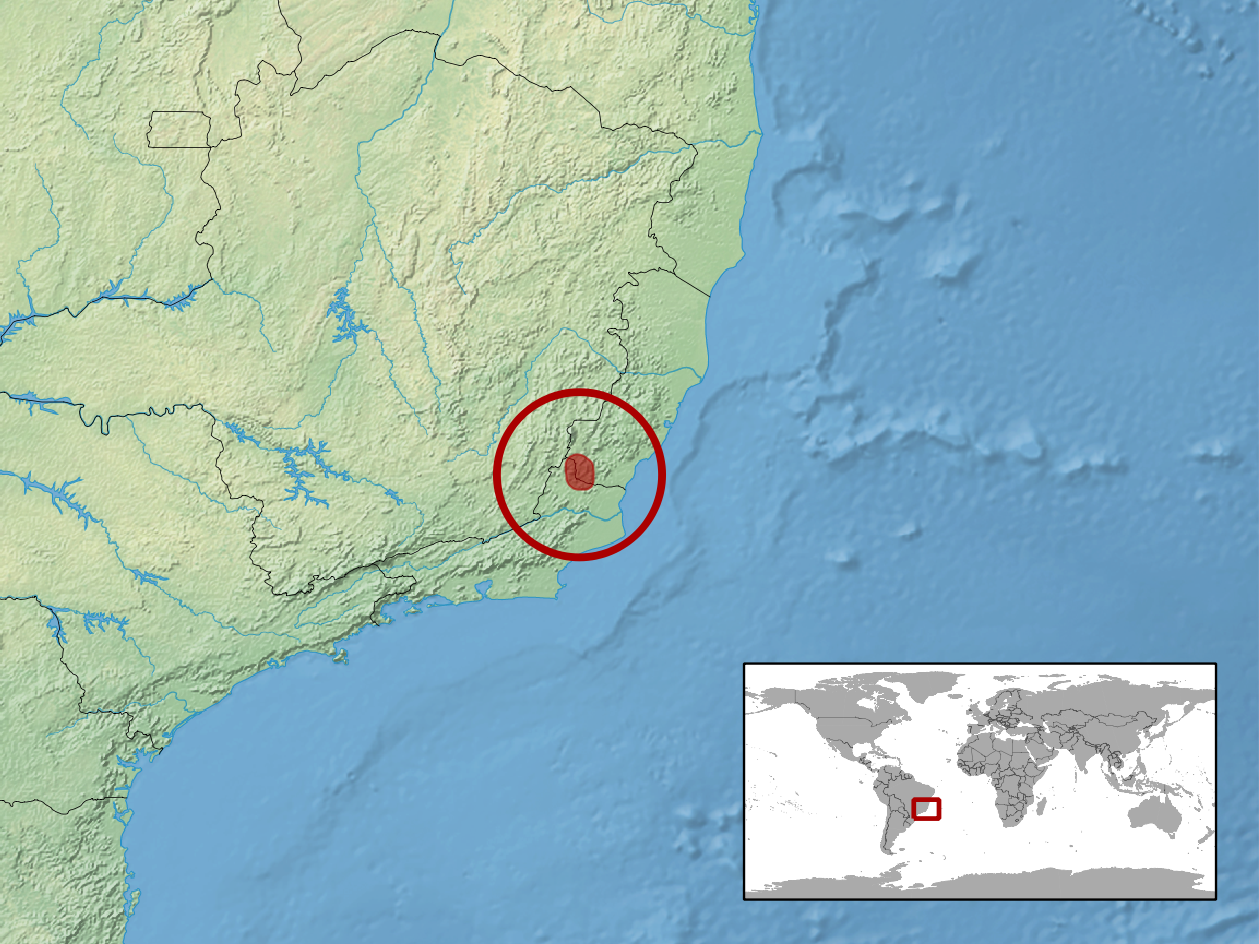

Species of lizard

Amphisbaena lumbricalis is a species of worm lizard found in Brazil.
