= Amphisbaena littoralis =

Scientific classification
- Kingdom: Animalia
- Phylum: Chordata
- Class: Reptilia
- Order: Squamata
- Clade: Amphisbaenia
- Family: Amphisbaenidae
- Genus: Amphisbaena
- Species: A. littoralis

Binomial name
- Amphisbaena littoralis Roberto, Brito, & Ávila, 2014

Species of lizard

Amphisbaena littoralis is a species of worm lizards found in Brazil.
