= Amphisbaena caetitensis =

Scientific classification
- Kingdom: Animalia
- Phylum: Chordata
- Class: Reptilia
- Order: Squamata
- Clade: Amphisbaenia
- Family: Amphisbaenidae
- Genus: Amphisbaena
- Species: A. caetitensis

Binomial name
- Amphisbaena caetitensis Almeida, Freitas, Silva, Costa-Valverde, Rodrigues, Pires, & Mott, 2018

Species of lizard

Amphisbaena caetitensis is a worm lizard species in the family Amphisbaenidae. It is endemic to Brazil.
