= Amphisbaena roberti =

Scientific classification
- Kingdom: Animalia
- Phylum: Chordata
- Class: Reptilia
- Order: Squamata
- Clade: Amphisbaenia
- Family: Amphisbaenidae
- Genus: Amphisbaena
- Species: A. roberti

Binomial name
- Amphisbaena roberti Gans, 1964

Synonyms
- Amphisbaena roberti Gans, 1964; Cercolophia roberti — Vanzolini, 1992; Amphisbaena roberti — Mott & Vieites, 2009

Species of lizard

Amphisbaena roberti is a species of worm lizard in the family Amphisbaenidae. The species is endemic to South America.

== Etymology ==
The specific name, roberti, is in honor of German herpetologist Robert Mertens.

== Geographic range ==
A. roberti is found in Brazil (Goiás, Minas Gerais, Paraná, São Paulo) and Paraguay.

== Reproduction ==
A. roberti is oviparous.
