= Amphisbaena kraoh =

Scientific classification
- Domain: Eukaryota
- Kingdom: Animalia
- Phylum: Chordata
- Class: Reptilia
- Order: Squamata
- Clade: Amphisbaenia
- Family: Amphisbaenidae
- Genus: Amphisbaena
- Species: A. kraoh

Binomial name
- Amphisbaena kraoh (Vanzolini, 1971)

Species of lizard

Amphisbaena kraoh is a species of worm lizards found in Brazil.
