= Amphisbaena steindachneri =

Conservation status
- Least Concern (IUCN 3.1)

Scientific classification
- Kingdom: Animalia
- Phylum: Chordata
- Class: Reptilia
- Order: Squamata
- Clade: Amphisbaenia
- Family: Amphisbaenidae
- Genus: Amphisbaena
- Species: A. steindachneri

Binomial name
- Amphisbaena steindachneri Strauch, 1881

Synonyms
- Amphisbaena steindachneri Strauch, 1881; Rhinoblanus oxyrhynchus Strauch, 1881; Cercolophia steindachneri — Dirksen & De la Riva, 2000; Amphisbaena steindachneri — Mott & Vieites, 2009

Species of lizard

Amphisbaena steindachneri is a species of worm lizard in the family Amphisbaenidae. The species is endemic to South America.

== Etymology ==
The specific name, steindachneri, is in honor of Austrian herpetologist Franz Steindachner.

== Geographic range ==
A. steindachneri is found in Bolivia, Brazil, and Paraguay.

== Habitat ==
The preferred natural habitat of A. steindachneri is savanna.

== Reproduction ==
A. steindachneri is oviparous.
