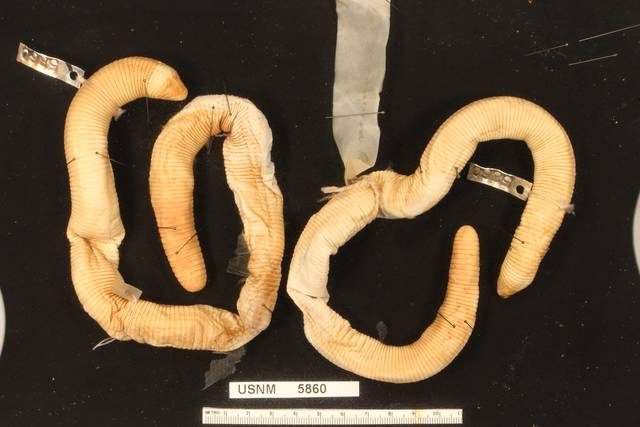

Conservation status
- Least Concern (IUCN 3.1)

Scientific classification
- Kingdom: Animalia
- Phylum: Chordata
- Class: Reptilia
- Order: Squamata
- Suborder: Lacertoidea
- Clade: Amphisbaenia
- Family: Amphisbaenidae
- Genus: Amphisbaena
- Species: A. camura

Binomial name
- Amphisbaena camura Cope, 1862

= Crooked worm lizard =

Species of lizard

The crooked worm lizard (Amphisbaena camura) is a worm lizard species in the genus Amphisbaena.

== Geographic range ==
A. camura is found in Bolivia, Brazil, and Paraguay.
