= Stejneger's worm lizard =

Conservation status
- Data Deficient (IUCN 3.1)

Scientific classification
- Kingdom: Animalia
- Phylum: Chordata
- Class: Reptilia
- Order: Squamata
- Clade: Amphisbaenia
- Family: Amphisbaenidae
- Genus: Amphisbaena
- Species: A. stejnegeri

Binomial name
- Amphisbaena stejnegeri Ruthven, 1922

Species of lizard

Stejneger's worm lizard (Amphisbaena stejnegeri) is a species of amphisbaenian in the family Amphisbaenidae. The species is endemic to Guyana.

== Etymology ==
The specific name, stejnegeri, is in honor of Norwegian-born American herpetologist Leonhard Stejneger.

== Habitat ==
The preferred habitat of A. stejnegeri is forest.

== Reproduction ==
A. stejnegeri is oviparous.
