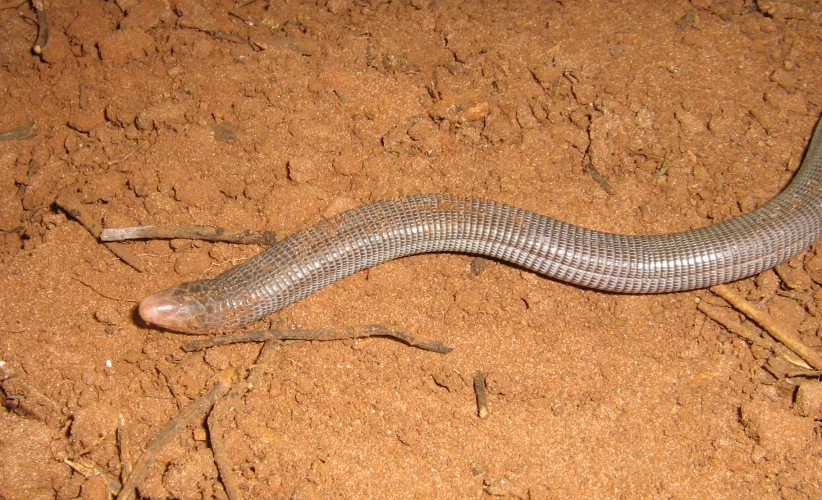

Conservation status
- Least Concern (IUCN 3.1)

Scientific classification
- Kingdom: Animalia
- Phylum: Chordata
- Class: Reptilia
- Order: Squamata
- Clade: Amphisbaenia
- Family: Amphisbaenidae
- Genus: Amphisbaena
- Species: A. mertensii

Binomial name
- Amphisbaena mertensii Strauch, 1881

Synonyms
- Amphisbaena Mertensii Strauch, 1881; Amphisbaena bohlsii Boulenger, 1894; Amphisbaena mattogrossensis Peracca, 1898; Amphisbaena carrucci Masi, 1911; Amphisbaena boulengeri Masi, 1911; Amphisbaena albissima Amaral, 1932; Amphisbaena mertensi — Cei, 1993; Amphisbaena mertensii — Gans, 2005

= Amphisbaena mertensii =

Species of lizard

Amphisbaena mertensii, also known as the Mertens' worm lizard or Mertens's worm lizard, is a species of worm lizard in the family Amphisbaenidae. The species is endemic to South America.

== Defensive behavior ==
Amphisbaenians are fossorial reptiles with few predators due to their powerful bite and writhing defensive tactics. However, some snakes have been found feeding on amphisbaenians including A. mertensii. This species is also able to defend itself against dangerous predators such as snakes by releasing a foul discharge from its cloacal region.

== Etymology ==
The specific name, mertensii, is in honor of a Dr. Mertens who collected the holotype.

== Geographic range ==
A. mertensii is found in northern Argentina, southeastern Brazil, and eastern Paraguay.

== Reproduction ==
A. mertensii is oviparous.

== See also ==
- List of reptiles of Brazil
