= Amphisbaena bahiana =

Scientific classification
- Domain: Eukaryota
- Kingdom: Animalia
- Phylum: Chordata
- Class: Reptilia
- Order: Squamata
- Clade: Amphisbaenia
- Family: Amphisbaenidae
- Genus: Amphisbaena
- Species: A. bahiana

Binomial name
- Amphisbaena bahiana Vanzolini, 1964

Species of lizard

Amphisbaena bahiana is a species of worm lizards found in Brazil.
