= Wagler's worm lizard =

Scientific classification
- Kingdom: Animalia
- Phylum: Chordata
- Class: Reptilia
- Order: Squamata
- Clade: Amphisbaenia
- Family: Amphisbaenidae
- Genus: Amphisbaena
- Species: A. vermicularis

Binomial name
- Amphisbaena vermicularis Wagler, 1824

Species of lizard

Wagler's worm lizard (Amphisbaena vermicularis) is a worm lizard species in the family Amphisbaenidae. It is endemic to Brazil and Bolivia.
