= Amphisbaena elbakyanae =

Scientific classification
- Kingdom: Animalia
- Phylum: Chordata
- Class: Reptilia
- Order: Squamata
- Clade: Amphisbaenia
- Family: Amphisbaenidae
- Genus: Amphisbaena
- Species: A. elbakyanae

Binomial name
- Amphisbaena elbakyanae Torres-Ramírez, Angarita-Sierra, & Vargas-Ramírez, 2021

Species of lizard

Amphisbaena elbakyanae is a species of worm lizard found in Colombia. Worm lizards are unique reptiles that resemble snakes in that they have long, tube-like bodies and no legs. Unlike snakes, they are not venomous and spend most of their time underground, digging through the soil.

The species was named in honor of Alexandra Elbakyan, creator of Sci-Hub. The authors cited "her colossal contributions for reducing the barriers in the way of science". The paper was published in an open access journal.
