= Amphisbaena uroxena =

Scientific classification
- Kingdom: Animalia
- Phylum: Chordata
- Class: Reptilia
- Order: Squamata
- Clade: Amphisbaenia
- Family: Amphisbaenidae
- Genus: Amphisbaena
- Species: A. uroxena

Binomial name
- Amphisbaena uroxena Mott, Rodrigues, De Freitas, & Silva, 2008

Species of lizard

Amphisbaena uroxena is a species of worm lizard found in Brazil.
