= South American worm lizard =

Conservation status
- Least Concern (IUCN 3.1)

Scientific classification
- Kingdom: Animalia
- Phylum: Chordata
- Class: Reptilia
- Order: Squamata
- Clade: Amphisbaenia
- Family: Amphisbaenidae
- Genus: Amphisbaena
- Species: A. angustifrons

Binomial name
- Amphisbaena angustifrons Cope, 1861

Species of lizard

The South American worm lizard (Amphisbaena angustifrons) is a worm lizard species in the family Amphisbaenidae. It is found in Argentina, Paraguay, and Bolivia.
