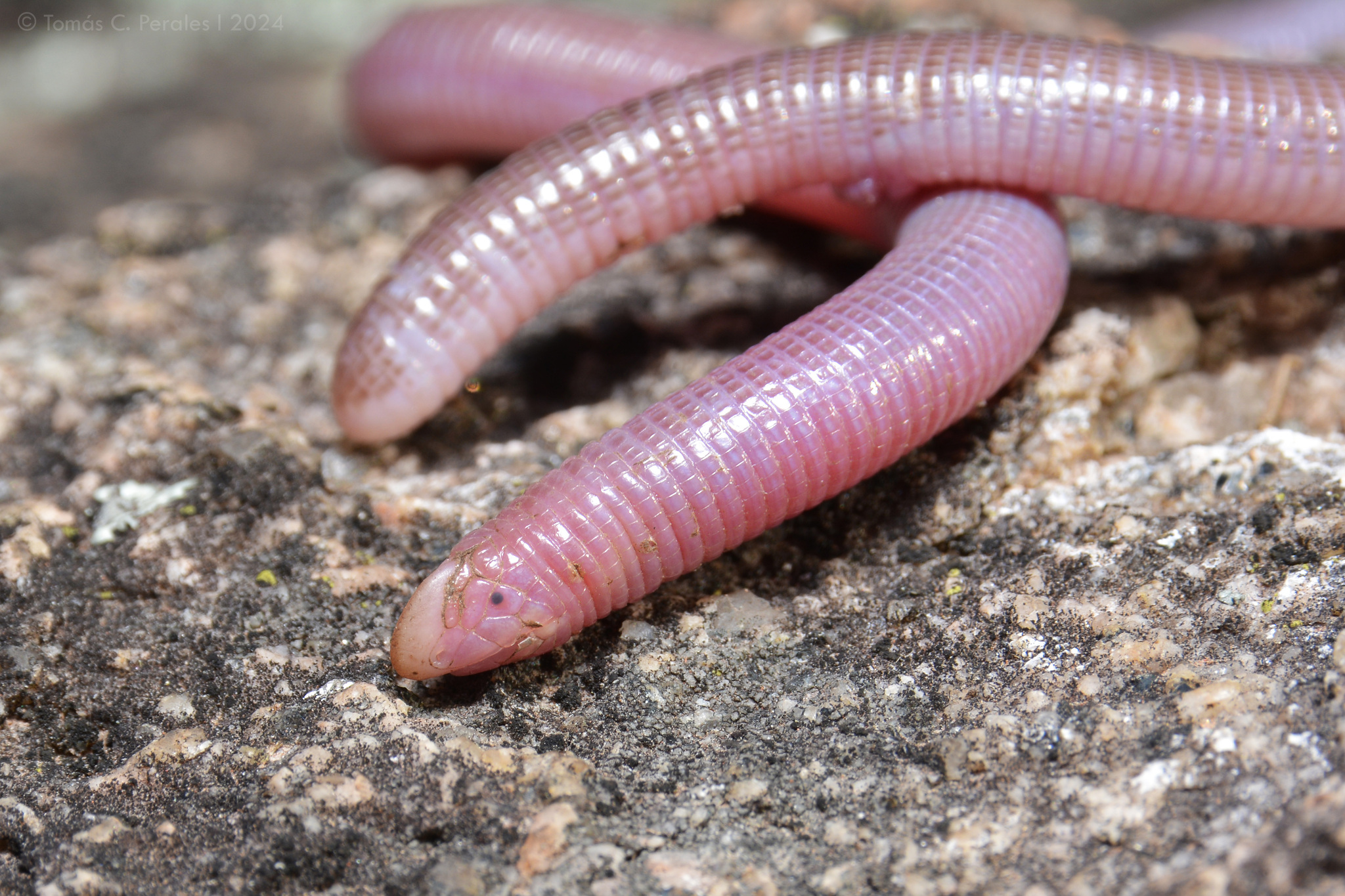

Conservation status
- Least Concern (IUCN 3.1)

Scientific classification
- Kingdom: Animalia
- Phylum: Chordata
- Class: Reptilia
- Order: Squamata
- Clade: Amphisbaenia
- Family: Amphisbaenidae
- Genus: Amphisbaena
- Species: A. kingii

Binomial name
- Amphisbaena kingii (Bell, 1833)

Synonyms
- Anops kingii Bell, 1833; Amphisbaena kingii — A.M.C. Duméril & Bibron, 1839; Anopsibaena kingii — Stejneger, 1916; Amphisbaena kingii — Mott & Vieites, 2009

= King's worm lizard =

Species of lizard

King's worm lizard (Amphisbaena kingii) is a species of amphisbaenian in the family Amphisbaenidae. The species is endemic to South America.

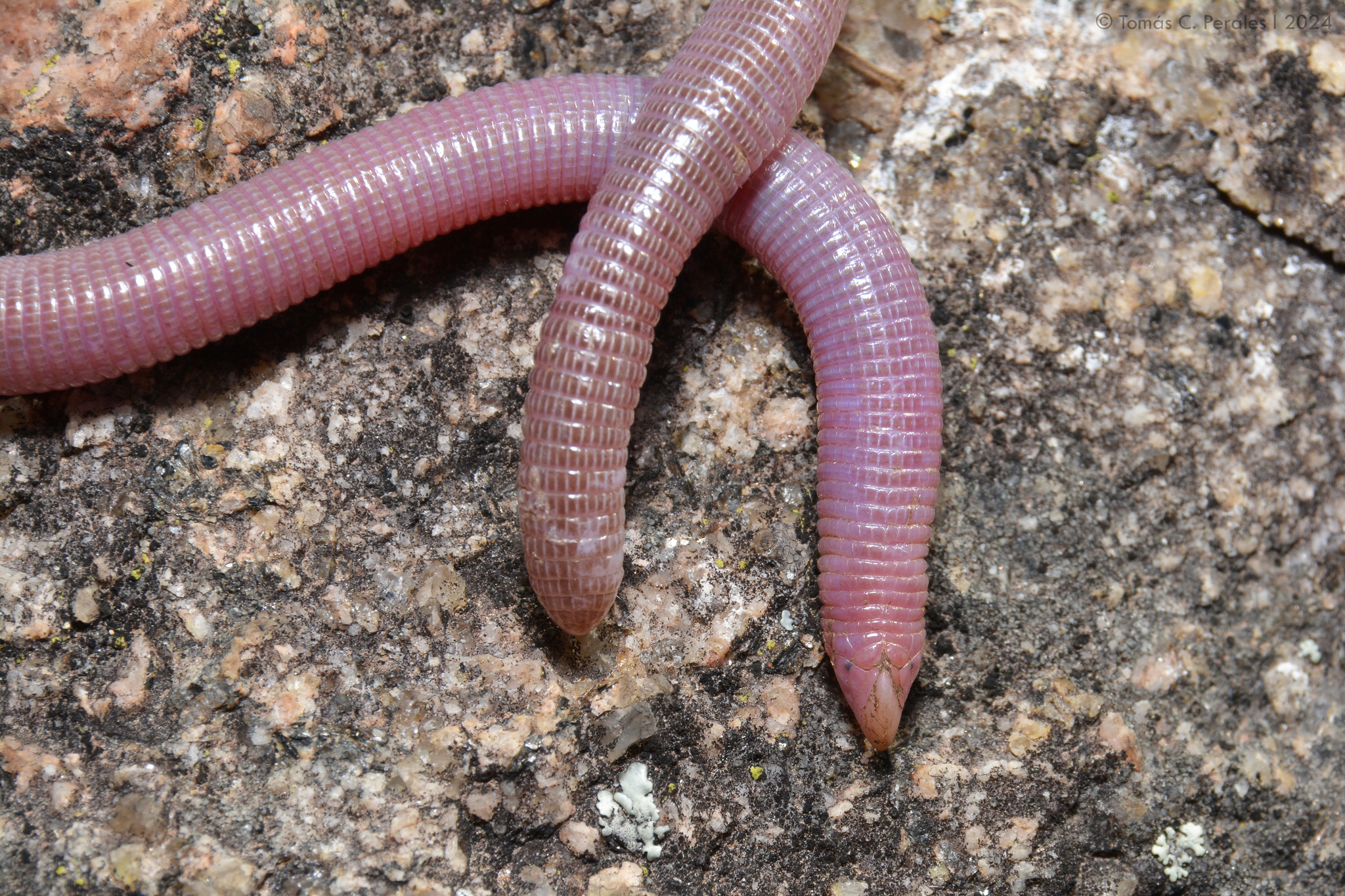
In Argentina

== Etymology ==
The specific name, kingii, is in honor of Australian marine surveyor Philip Parker King.

== Geographic range ==
A. kingii is found in Argentina, Bolivia, Brazil, and Uruguay.

== Habitat ==
The preferred natural habitats of A. kingii are savanna and grassland.

== Description ==
A. kingii may attain a snout-to-vent length (SVL) of 21 cm (8.3 in), plus a tail about 2 cm (0.79 in) long. Dorsally, it is purplish brown. Ventrally, it is whitish.

== Reproduction ==
A. kingii is oviparous.
