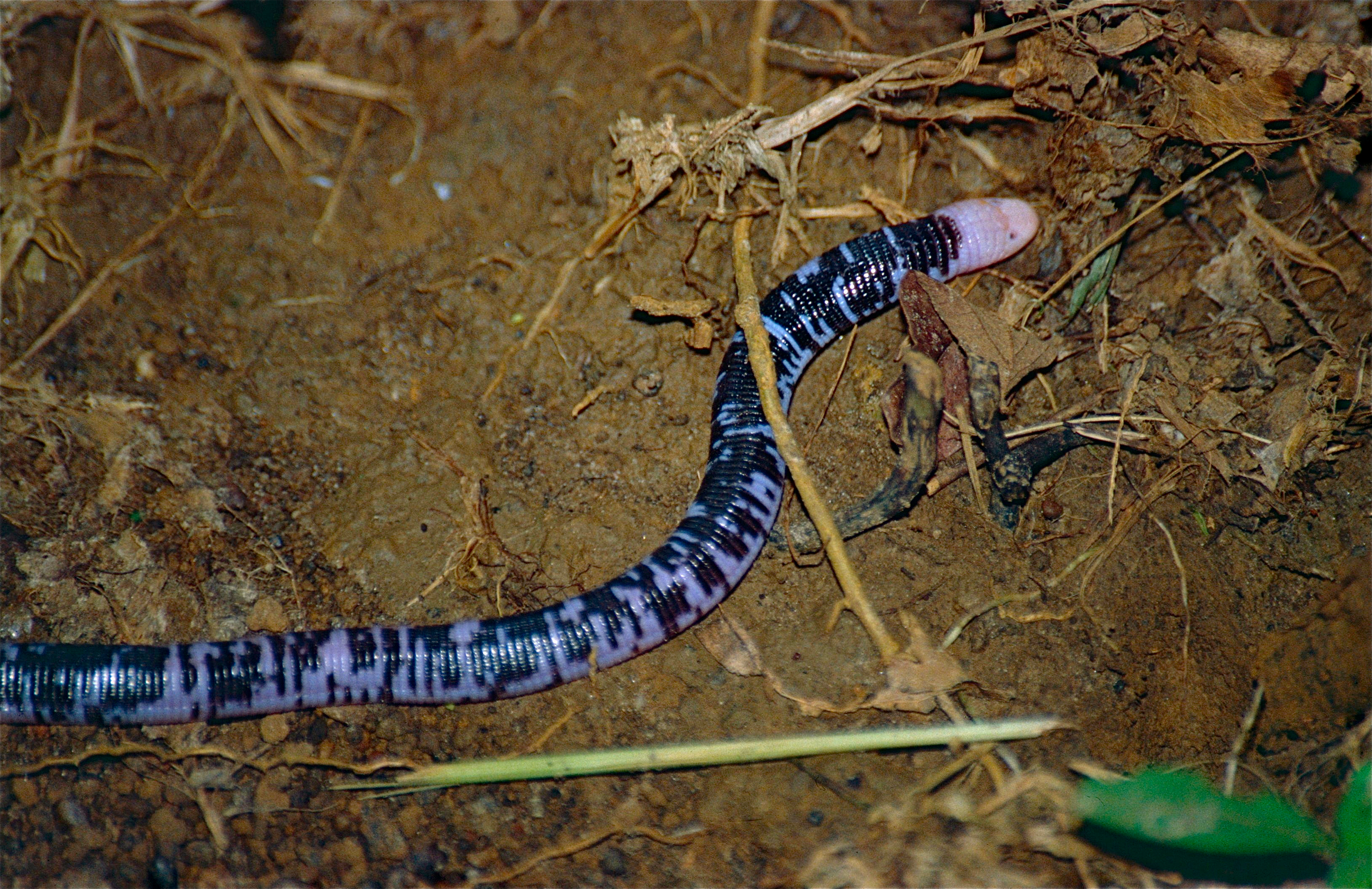
- In French Guiana
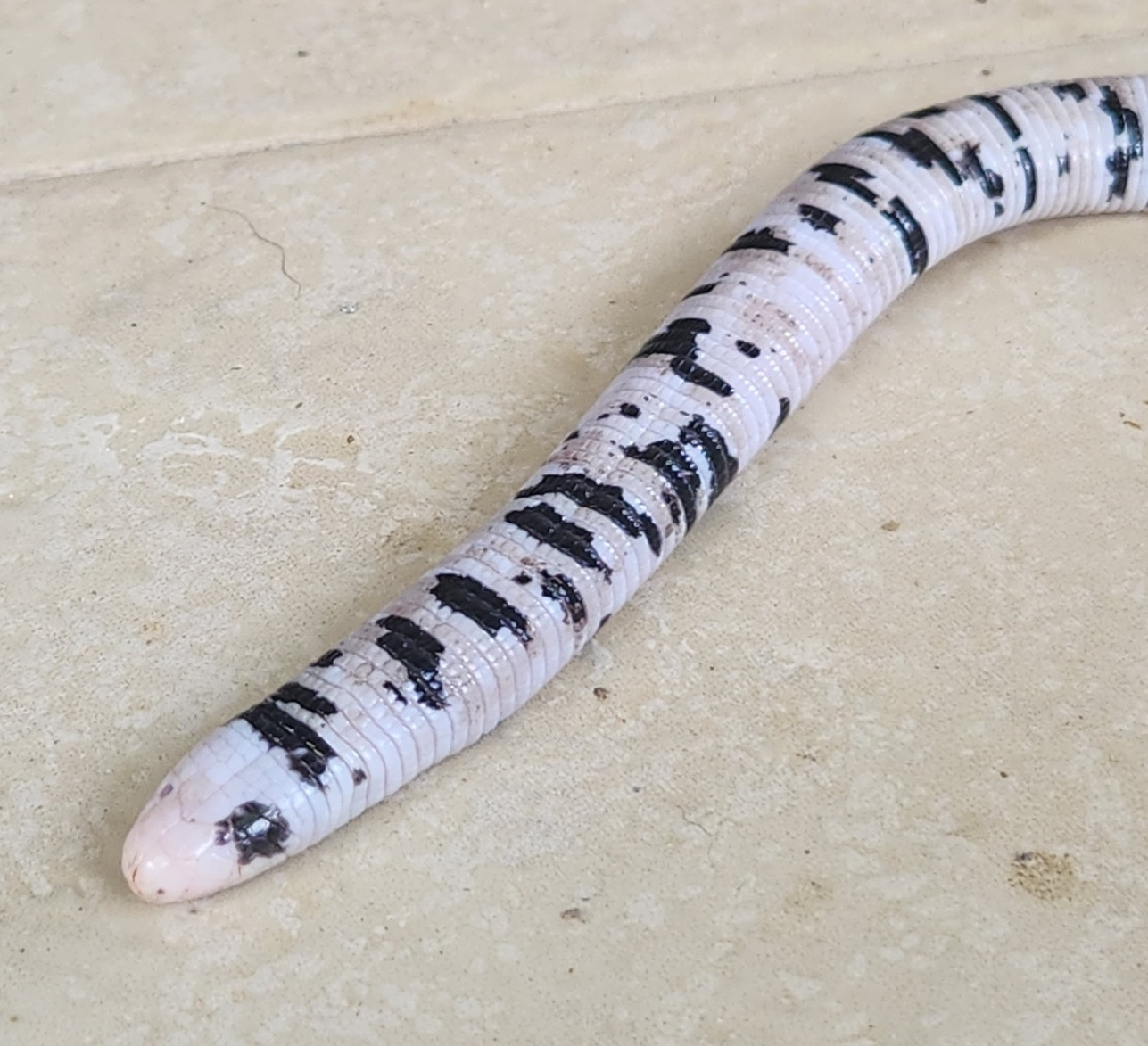
- A. f. bassleri, Ecuador

Conservation status
- Least Concern (IUCN 3.1)

Scientific classification
- Kingdom: Animalia
- Phylum: Chordata
- Class: Reptilia
- Order: Squamata
- Suborder: Lacertoidea
- Clade: Amphisbaenia
- Family: Amphisbaenidae
- Genus: Amphisbaena
- Species: A. fuliginosa

Binomial name
- Amphisbaena fuliginosa Linnaeus, 1758

Synonyms
- Amphisbaena vulgaris Laurenti, 1768; Amphisbaena magnifica Laurenti, 1768; Amphisbaena flava Laurenti, 1768; Amphisbaena americana Gray, 1844

= Amphisbaena fuliginosa =

Species of lizard

Amphisbaena fuliginosa, also known as the black-and-white worm lizard, speckled worm lizard or spotted worm lizard, is a species of amphisbaenian in the genus Amphisbaena. The ecology of A. fuliginosa is poorly known due to its fossorial habits. However, this species can be easily distinguished from others because of its characteristic white and black mosaic pattern that covers both the dorsal and ventral side.

== Geographic range ==
It is found in northern South America including the island of Trinidad, and southwards to the Brazilian Cerrado biome. The southernmost areas of the Brazilian Cerrado where A. fuliginosa is found are Minas Gerais and Goiás.

== Description ==
Amphisbaena fuliginosa grows to a total length (body + tail) of 30–45 centimetres (12–18 in).

== Habitat ==
It inhabits Amazonian forest areas.

== Behavior and diet ==
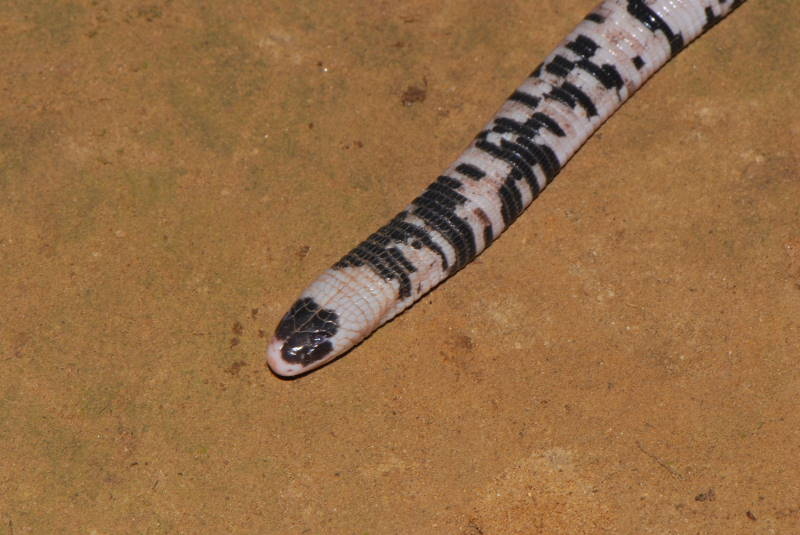
A. fuliginosa

It is a burrowing nocturnal species and spends most of its time underground. A. fuliginosa will feed on any small invertebrate, or insect, that it can find while burrowing. Some of those insects include beetles, ants (especially adults of the subfamily Ecitoninae), termites, and other arthropods (such as spiders, centipedes, millipedes, and earthworms), but they also consume species of Orthoptera, such as crickets and grasshoppers, and sometimes on small vertebrates, lizard eggs and their shells, and other egg shells. When it finds its prey it will use its strong jaws to catch and kill it.

== Reproduction ==
This species is oviparous.

== Human interaction ==
In Yanomami mythology Amphisbaena are said to emerge from the spinal columns of warriors killed in battle, and have a supernatural connection to the underworld. When one is encountered in a village it is customary to ask it "Who are you? Where do you come from?" If it responds with a high pitch cry it has good intentions. If it remains silent it may have nefarious intentions.
