= Cope's worm lizard =

Conservation status
- Endangered (IUCN 3.1)

Scientific classification
- Kingdom: Animalia
- Phylum: Chordata
- Class: Reptilia
- Order: Squamata
- Clade: Amphisbaenia
- Family: Amphisbaenidae
- Genus: Amphisbaena
- Species: A. fenestrata

Binomial name
- Amphisbaena fenestrata (Cope, 1861)

Synonyms
- Diphalus fenestratus Cope, 1861; Amphisbaena antillensis J.T. Reinhardt & Lütken, 1862; Amphisbaena fenestrata — Strauch, 1881

Species of lizard

Cope's worm lizard (Amphisbaena fenestrata) is a worm lizard species in the genus Amphisbaena.

== Geographic range ==
It is found in the Virgin Islands on the following islands: St. Thomas, St. John, Tortola, Great Camanoe, and Virgin Gorda.
