= Amphisbaena metallurga =

Scientific classification
- Kingdom: Animalia
- Phylum: Chordata
- Class: Reptilia
- Order: Squamata
- Clade: Amphisbaenia
- Family: Amphisbaenidae
- Genus: Amphisbaena
- Species: A. metallurga

Binomial name
- Amphisbaena metallurga Costa, Resende, Teixeira, Vechio, & Clemente, 2015

Species of lizard

Amphisbaena metallurga is a species of amphisbaenian in the family Amphisbaenidae. The species is endemic to Brazil.
