= Cayemite long-tailed amphisbaena =

Conservation status
- Endangered (IUCN 3.1)

Scientific classification
- Kingdom: Animalia
- Phylum: Chordata
- Class: Reptilia
- Order: Squamata
- Clade: Amphisbaenia
- Family: Amphisbaenidae
- Genus: Amphisbaena
- Species: A. caudalis

Binomial name
- Amphisbaena caudalis Cochran, 1928

Species of lizard

The Cayemite long-tailed amphisbaena (Amphisbaena caudalis) is a worm lizard species in the family Amphisbaenidae. It is endemic to Haiti.
