= Amphisbaena longinqua =

Scientific classification
- Kingdom: Animalia
- Phylum: Chordata
- Class: Reptilia
- Order: Squamata
- Clade: Amphisbaenia
- Family: Amphisbaenidae
- Genus: Amphisbaena
- Species: A. longinqua

Binomial name
- Amphisbaena longinqua Teixeira Jr., Dal Vechio, Recoder, Cassimiro, de Sena, & Rodrigues, 2019

Species of lizard

Amphisbaena longinqua is a worm lizard species in the family Amphisbaenidae. It is endemic to Brazil.
