= Amphisbaena saxosa =

Scientific classification
- Domain: Eukaryota
- Kingdom: Animalia
- Phylum: Chordata
- Class: Reptilia
- Order: Squamata
- Clade: Amphisbaenia
- Family: Amphisbaenidae
- Genus: Amphisbaena
- Species: A. saxosa

Binomial name
- Amphisbaena saxosa (Castro-Mello, 2003)

Species of lizard

Amphisbaena saxosa is a species of worm lizard found in Brazil.
