= Amphisbaena arda =

Scientific classification
- Kingdom: Animalia
- Phylum: Chordata
- Class: Reptilia
- Order: Squamata
- Clade: Amphisbaenia
- Family: Amphisbaenidae
- Genus: Amphisbaena
- Species: A. arda

Binomial name
- Amphisbaena arda Rodrigues, 2003

Species of lizard

Amphisbaena arda is a worm lizard species in the family Amphisbaenidae. It is endemic to Brazil.
