= Amphisbaena supernumeraria =

Scientific classification
- Kingdom: Animalia
- Phylum: Chordata
- Class: Reptilia
- Order: Squamata
- Clade: Amphisbaenia
- Family: Amphisbaenidae
- Genus: Amphisbaena
- Species: A. supernumeraria

Binomial name
- Amphisbaena supernumeraria Mott, Rodrigues, & Dos Santos, 2009

Species of lizard

Amphisbaena supernumeraria is a species of worm lizard found in Brazil.
