= Urucum worm lizard =

Conservation status
- Least Concern (IUCN 3.1)

Scientific classification
- Kingdom: Animalia
- Phylum: Chordata
- Class: Reptilia
- Order: Squamata
- Clade: Amphisbaenia
- Family: Amphisbaenidae
- Genus: Amphisbaena
- Species: A. leeseri

Binomial name
- Amphisbaena leeseri Gans, 1964

Species of lizard

The Urucum worm lizard (Amphisbaena leeseri) is a species of amphisbaenian in the family Amphisbaenidae. The species is native to central South America.

== Etymology ==
The specific name, leeseri, is in honor of Leo Leeser (1871–1942), who died in the Theresienstadt concentration camp, but whose estate funded the Leo Leeser Center for Tropical Biology.

== Geographic range ==
A. leeseri is found in southwestern Brazil (Mato Grosso do Sul state) and in adjacent northern Paraguay.

== Habitat ==
The preferred natural habitat of A. leeseri is savanna.

== Description ==
A. leeseri is small for its genus. It has 216–240 body annuli (rings of scales), and 14–16 tail annuli.

== Behavior ==
A. leeseri is terrestrial and fossorial.

== Reproduction ==
A. leeseri is oviparous.
