= Amphisbaena hiata =

Conservation status
- Data Deficient (IUCN 3.1)

Scientific classification
- Kingdom: Animalia
- Phylum: Chordata
- Class: Reptilia
- Order: Squamata
- Suborder: Lacertoidea
- Clade: Amphisbaenia
- Family: Amphisbaenidae
- Genus: Amphisbaena
- Species: A. hiata

Binomial name
- Amphisbaena hiata Montero & Céspedez, 2002

Species of lizard

Amphisbaena hiata is a species of worm lizards found in Argentina.
