= Werner's worm lizard =

Conservation status
- Data Deficient (IUCN 3.1)

Scientific classification
- Kingdom: Animalia
- Phylum: Chordata
- Class: Reptilia
- Order: Squamata
- Clade: Amphisbaenia
- Family: Amphisbaenidae
- Genus: Amphisbaena
- Species: A. polygrammica

Binomial name
- Amphisbaena polygrammica Werner, 1900
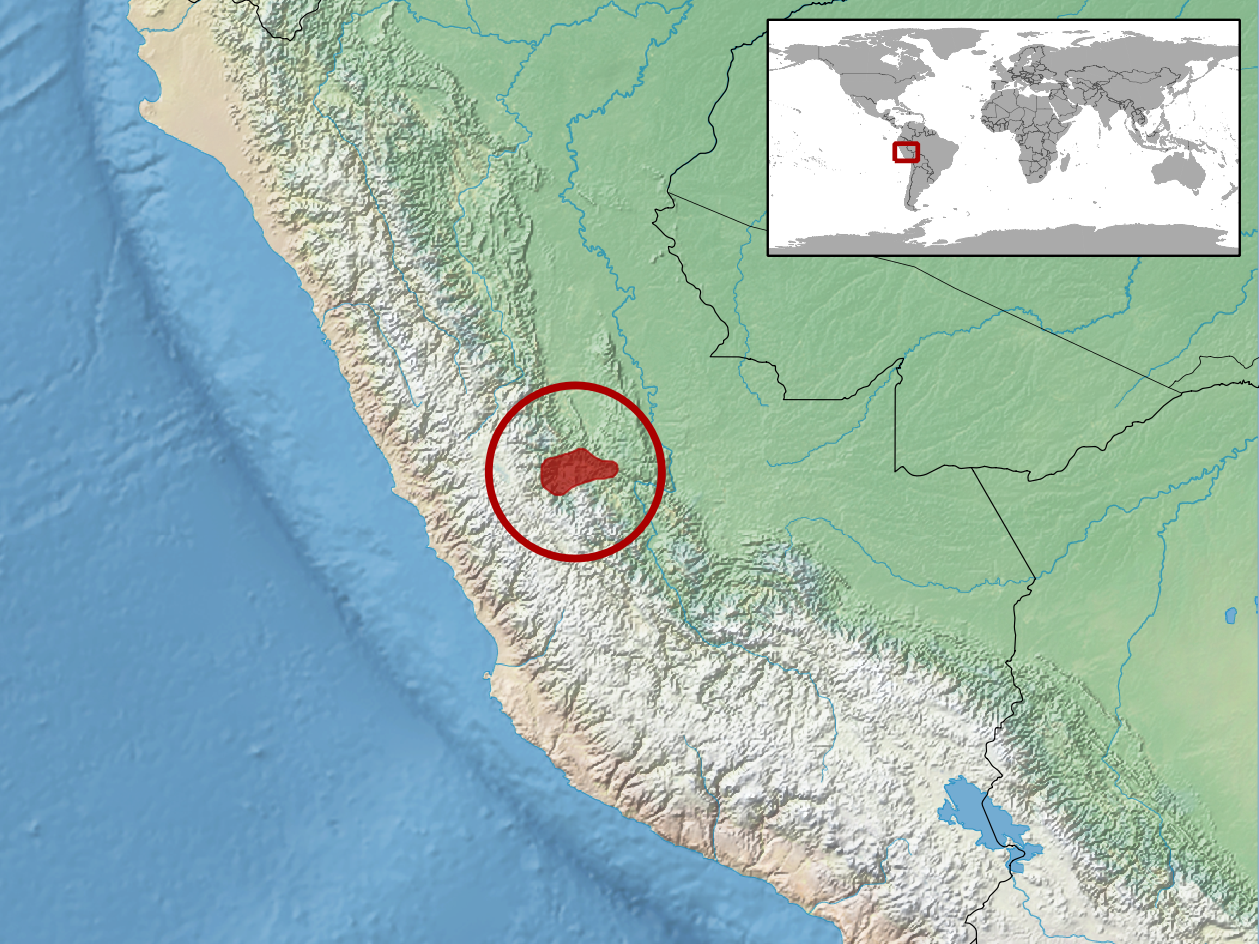

Species of lizard

Werner's worm lizard (Amphisbaena polygrammica) is a worm lizard species in the family Amphisbaenidae. It is endemic to Peru.
