= Amphisbaena bedai =

Scientific classification
- Domain: Eukaryota
- Kingdom: Animalia
- Phylum: Chordata
- Class: Reptilia
- Order: Squamata
- Clade: Amphisbaenia
- Family: Amphisbaenidae
- Genus: Amphisbaena
- Species: A. bedai

Binomial name
- Amphisbaena bedai (Vanzolini, 1991)

Species of lizard

Amphisbaena bedai is a species of worm lizard endemic to Brazil.
