= Lead worm lizard =

Conservation status
- Least Concern (IUCN 3.1)

Scientific classification
- Kingdom: Animalia
- Phylum: Chordata
- Class: Reptilia
- Order: Squamata
- Clade: Amphisbaenia
- Family: Amphisbaenidae
- Genus: Amphisbaena
- Species: A. plumbea

Binomial name
- Amphisbaena plumbea Gray, 1872

Species of lizard

The lead worm lizard (Amphisbaena plumbea) is a worm lizard species in the family Amphisbaenidae. It is endemic to Argentina.
