= Slender worm lizard =

Conservation status
- Least Concern (IUCN 3.1)

Scientific classification
- Kingdom: Animalia
- Phylum: Chordata
- Class: Reptilia
- Order: Squamata
- Clade: Amphisbaenia
- Family: Amphisbaenidae
- Genus: Amphisbaena
- Species: A. gracilis

Binomial name
- Amphisbaena gracilis Strauch, 1881
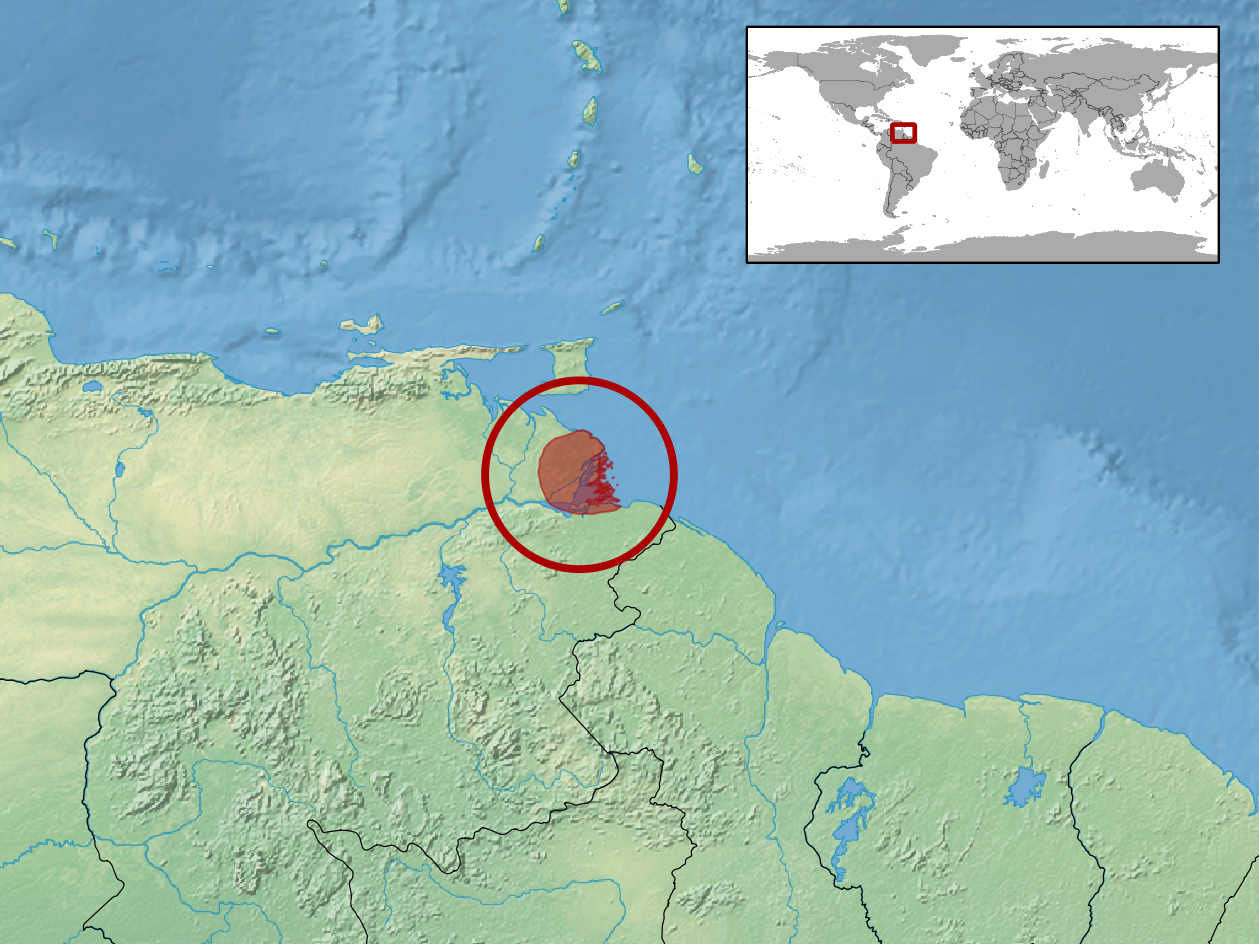

Species of lizard

The slender worm lizard (Amphisbaena gracilis) is a worm lizard species in the family Amphisbaenidae. It is endemic to Venezuela.
