= Amphisbaena bolivica =

Conservation status
- Least Concern (IUCN 3.1)

Scientific classification
- Kingdom: Animalia
- Phylum: Chordata
- Class: Reptilia
- Order: Squamata
- Suborder: Lacertoidea
- Clade: Amphisbaenia
- Family: Amphisbaenidae
- Genus: Amphisbaena
- Species: A. bolivica

Binomial name
- Amphisbaena bolivica Mertens, 1929

Species of lizard

Amphisbaena bolivica is a species of worm lizard found in Argentina, Bolivia, and Paraguay.
