= Amphisbaena arenicola =

Scientific classification
- Kingdom: Animalia
- Phylum: Chordata
- Class: Reptilia
- Order: Squamata
- Clade: Amphisbaenia
- Family: Amphisbaenidae
- Genus: Amphisbaena
- Species: A. arenicola

Binomial name
- Amphisbaena arenicola Perez & Borges-Martins, 2019

Species of lizard

Amphisbaena arenicola is a species of amphisbaenian in the family Amphisbaenidae. The species is endemic to Brazil.
