= Barahona amphisbaena =

Conservation status
- Endangered (IUCN 3.1)

Scientific classification
- Kingdom: Animalia
- Phylum: Chordata
- Class: Reptilia
- Order: Squamata
- Clade: Amphisbaenia
- Family: Amphisbaenidae
- Genus: Amphisbaena
- Species: A. hyporissor

Binomial name
- Amphisbaena hyporissor Thomas, 1965
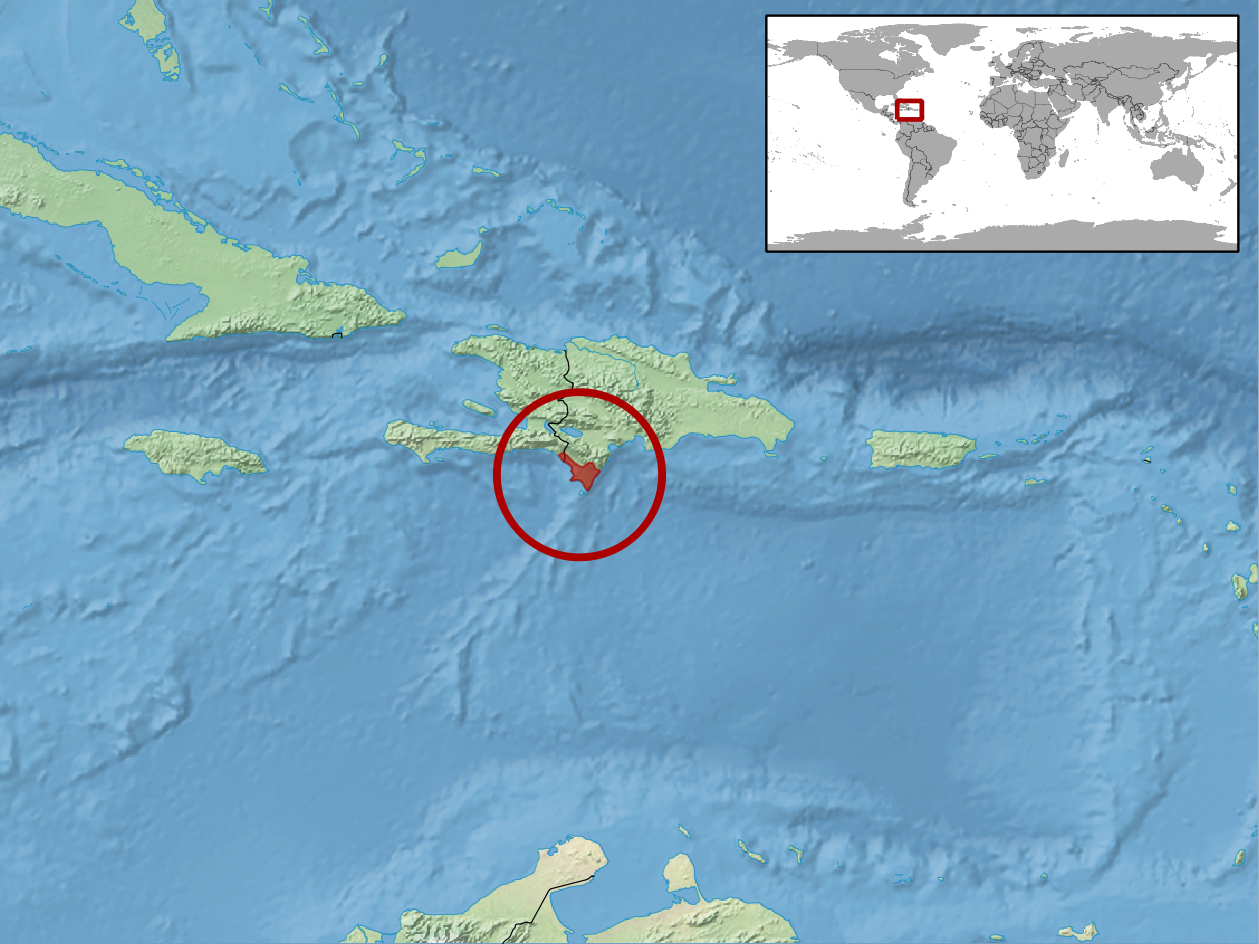

Species of lizard

The Barahona amphisbaena (Amphisbaena hyporissor) is a species of worm lizard found in Hispaniola (Haiti and the Dominican Republic).
