= Hoge's worm lizard =

Conservation status
- Least Concern (IUCN 3.1)

Scientific classification
- Kingdom: Animalia
- Phylum: Chordata
- Class: Reptilia
- Order: Squamata
- Clade: Amphisbaenia
- Family: Amphisbaenidae
- Genus: Amphisbaena
- Species: A. hogei

Binomial name
- Amphisbaena hogei Vanzolini, 1950

Synonyms
- Amphisbaena darwinii hogei Vanzolini, 1950; Amphisbaena hogei — Gans, 2005

Species of amphibaenian

Hoge's worm lizard (Amphisbaena hogei) is a species of amphisbaenian in the family Amphisbaenidae. The species is endemic to Brazil.

== Etymology ==
The specific name, hogei, is in honor of Belgian-Brazilian herpetologist Alphonse Richard Hoge.

== Geographic range ==
A. hogei is found in the Brazilian states of Rio de Janeiro and São Paulo.

== Habitat ==
The preferred natural habitat of A. hogei is forest.

== Description ==
A small species, A. hogei may attain a snout-to-vent length (SVL) of 13.4 cm (5.3 in). It has 177–191 body annuli and 15–19 tail annuli. It is brown dorsally, and it is paler ventrally.

== Behavior ==
A. hogei is terrestrial and fossorial.

== Reproduction ==
A. hogei is oviparous.
