= Amphisbaena brevis =

Scientific classification
- Domain: Eukaryota
- Kingdom: Animalia
- Phylum: Chordata
- Class: Reptilia
- Order: Squamata
- Clade: Amphisbaenia
- Family: Amphisbaenidae
- Genus: Amphisbaena
- Species: A. brevis

Binomial name
- Amphisbaena brevis Strüssmann & Mott, 2009

Species of lizard

Amphisbaena brevis is a species of worm lizard endemic to Brazil.
