= Amphisbaena mebengokre =

Scientific classification
- Kingdom: Animalia
- Phylum: Chordata
- Class: Reptilia
- Order: Squamata
- Clade: Amphisbaenia
- Family: Amphisbaenidae
- Genus: Amphisbaena
- Species: A. mebengokre

Binomial name
- Amphisbaena mebengokre Ribeiro, Sá, Santos, Graboski, Zaher, Guedes, Andrade & Vaz-Silva, 2019

Species of lizard

Amphisbaena mebengokre is a species of worm lizard in the family Amphisbaenidae. The species is endemic to Brazil.

== Etymology ==
The specific name, mebengokre, refers to the Mebêngôkre, an indigenous people of Brazil.

== Geographic range ==
A. mebengokre is found in Goiás state, Brazil.
