= Perico worm lizard =

Scientific classification
- Kingdom: Animalia
- Phylum: Chordata
- Class: Reptilia
- Order: Squamata
- Clade: Amphisbaenia
- Family: Amphisbaenidae
- Genus: Amphisbaena
- Species: A. pericensis

Binomial name
- Amphisbaena pericensis Noble, 1921

Species of lizard

The Perico worm lizard (Amphisbaena pericensis) is a worm lizard species in the family Amphisbaenidae. It is endemic to Peru.
