= Pestel amphisbaena =

Conservation status
- Critically Endangered (IUCN 3.1)

Scientific classification
- Kingdom: Animalia
- Phylum: Chordata
- Class: Reptilia
- Order: Squamata
- Clade: Amphisbaenia
- Family: Amphisbaenidae
- Genus: Amphisbaena
- Species: A. leali

Binomial name
- Amphisbaena leali Thomas & Hedges, 2006

Species of lizard

The Pestel amphisbaena (Amphisbaena leali) is a species of amphisbaenian in the family Amphisbaenidae. The species is endemic to Haiti.

== Etymology ==
The specific name, leali, is in honor of herpetologist Manuel Leal, co-collector of the holotype.

== Description ==
A. leali may attain a snout-to-vent length (SVL) of 25.4 cm (10.0 in). It is heavy-bodied, and its tail is relatively long for an amphisbaenian.

== Geographic range ==
A. leali is found in the Haitian department of Grand'Anse.

== Habitat ==
The preferred natural habitat of A. leali is forest.

== Behavior ==
A. leali is terrestrial and fossorial.

== Reproduction ==
A. leali is oviparous.
