= Amphisbaena kiriri =

Scientific classification
- Kingdom: Animalia
- Phylum: Chordata
- Class: Reptilia
- Order: Squamata
- Clade: Amphisbaenia
- Family: Amphisbaenidae
- Genus: Amphisbaena
- Species: A. kiriri

Binomial name
- Amphisbaena kiriri L. Ribeiro, Gomides & Costa, 2018

Species of lizard

Amphisbaena kiriri is a species of worm lizard in the family Amphisbaenidae. The species is endemic to northeastern Brazil.

== Etymology ==
The specific name, kiriri, refers to the Kiriri, an indigenous tribe of the Brazilian Caatinga.

== Geographic range ==
A. kiriri is found in Bahia state, Brazil.

== Description ==
A. kiriri is dark gray dorsally, and cream-colored ventrally. Furthermore, the first two to three ventral segments are dark gray in color and the remainder ventral segments are cream colored including the ventral portion of the head and the rest of the belly. It has 158–165 body annuli, and two precloacal pores.
