= Cuban many-ringed amphisbaena =

Conservation status
- Least Concern (IUCN 3.1)

Scientific classification
- Kingdom: Animalia
- Phylum: Chordata
- Class: Reptilia
- Order: Squamata
- Clade: Amphisbaenia
- Family: Amphisbaenidae
- Genus: Amphisbaena
- Species: A. barbouri

Binomial name
- Amphisbaena barbouri Gans & Alexander, 1962

Synonyms
- Amphisbaena cubana barbouri Gans & Alexander, 1962; Amphisbaena barbouri — Thomas & Hedges, 1998

Species of amphisbaenian

The Cuban many-ringed amphisbaena (Amphisbaena barbouri), also known commonly as the Cuban many-ringed worm lizard, is a species of amphisbaenian in the family Amphisbaenidae. The species is endemic to Cuba.

== Etymology ==
The specific name, barbouri, is in honor of American herpetologist Thomas Barbour.

== Habitat ==
The preferred habitat of A. barbouri is forest.

== Reproduction ==
A. barbouri is oviparous.
