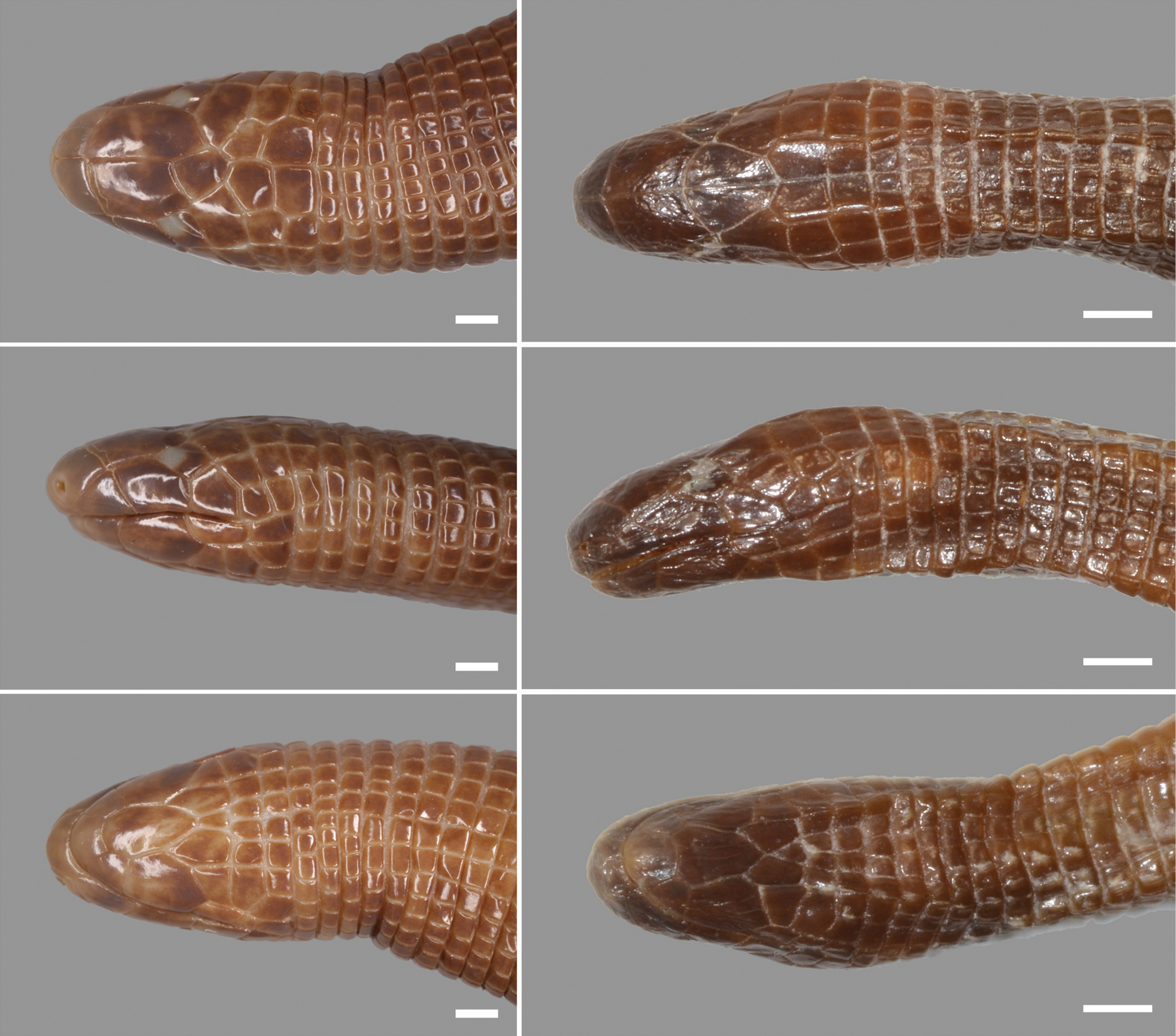

Conservation status
- Data Deficient (IUCN 3.1)

Scientific classification
- Kingdom: Animalia
- Phylum: Chordata
- Class: Reptilia
- Order: Squamata
- Clade: Amphisbaenia
- Family: Amphisbaenidae
- Genus: Amphisbaena
- Species: A. slateri

Binomial name
- Amphisbaena slateri Boulenger, 1907

= Slater's worm lizard =

Species of lizard

Slater's worm lizard (Amphisbaena slateri) is a species of amphisbaenian in the family Amphisbaenidae. The species is endemic to western South America.

== Etymology ==
The specific name, slateri, is in honor of Thomas Slater who collected the holotype.

== Geographic range ==
A. slateri is found in Peru and Bolivia.

== Habitat ==
The preferred natural habitat of A. slateri is forest, at altitudes of 610–2,000 m (2,000–6,560 ft).

== Description ==
A. slateri has a rounded head and a rounded tail tip. The body coloration is uniformly brown dorsally and ventrally.

== Reproduction ==
A. slateri is oviparous.
