= Amphisbaena acrobeles =

Scientific classification
- Kingdom: Animalia
- Phylum: Chordata
- Class: Reptilia
- Order: Squamata
- Clade: Amphisbaenia
- Family: Amphisbaenidae
- Genus: Amphisbaena
- Species: A. acrobeles

Binomial name
- Amphisbaena acrobeles (Ribeiro, Castro-Mello, & Nogueira, 2009)

Species of lizard

Amphisbaena acrobeles is a worm lizard species in the family Amphisbaenidae. It is endemic to Brazil.
