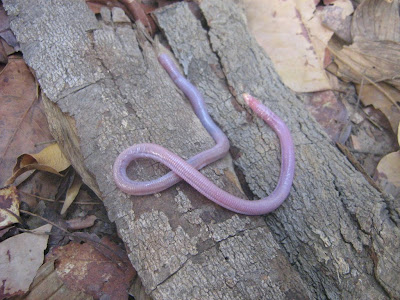

Scientific classification
- Domain: Eukaryota
- Kingdom: Animalia
- Phylum: Chordata
- Class: Reptilia
- Order: Squamata
- Clade: Amphisbaenia
- Family: Amphisbaenidae
- Genus: Amphisbaena
- Species: A. bilabialata

Binomial name
- Amphisbaena bilabialata (Stimson, 1972)

= Amphisbaena bilabialata =

Species of lizard

Amphisbaena bilabialata is a species of worm lizards found in Brazil.
