= Amphisbaena caiari =

Scientific classification
- Kingdom: Animalia
- Phylum: Chordata
- Class: Reptilia
- Order: Squamata
- Clade: Amphisbaenia
- Family: Amphisbaenidae
- Genus: Amphisbaena
- Species: A. caiari

Binomial name
- Amphisbaena caiari Teixeira Jr., Da Vechio, Neto, & Rodrigues, 2014

Species of lizard

Amphisbaena caiari is a species of worm lizard endemic to Brazil.
