= Amphisbaena persephone =

Scientific classification
- Domain: Eukaryota
- Kingdom: Animalia
- Phylum: Chordata
- Class: Reptilia
- Order: Squamata
- Clade: Amphisbaenia
- Family: Amphisbaenidae
- Genus: Amphisbaena
- Species: A. persephone

Binomial name
- Amphisbaena persephone Pinna, Mendonça, Bocchiglieri, & Fernandes, 2014

Species of lizard

Amphisbaena persephone is a species of worm lizard found in Brazil.
