= Amphisbaena filiformis =

Scientific classification
- Kingdom: Animalia
- Phylum: Chordata
- Class: Reptilia
- Order: Squamata
- Clade: Amphisbaenia
- Family: Amphisbaenidae
- Genus: Amphisbaena
- Species: A. filiformis

Binomial name
- Amphisbaena filiformis Ribeiro, Gomes, Rodrigues Da Silva, Cintra, & Da Silva, 2016

Species of lizard

Amphisbaena filiformis is a species of worm lizard found in Brazil.
