= Brazilian worm lizard =

Scientific classification
- Kingdom: Animalia
- Phylum: Chordata
- Class: Reptilia
- Order: Squamata
- Clade: Amphisbaenia
- Family: Amphisbaenidae
- Genus: Amphisbaena
- Species: A. brasiliana

Binomial name
- Amphisbaena brasiliana (Gray, 1865)

Species of lizard

The Brazilian worm lizard (Amphisbaena brasiliana) is a species of worm lizard in the family Amphisbaenidae. It is endemic to Brazil.
