= Spurrell's worm lizard =

Conservation status
- Data Deficient (IUCN 3.1)

Scientific classification
- Kingdom: Animalia
- Phylum: Chordata
- Class: Reptilia
- Order: Squamata
- Clade: Amphisbaenia
- Family: Amphisbaenidae
- Genus: Amphisbaena
- Species: A. spurrelli

Binomial name
- Amphisbaena spurrelli Boulenger, 1915

Species of lizard

Spurrell's worm lizard (Amphisbaena spurrelli) is a species of amphisbaenian in the family Amphisbaenidae. The species is native to Central America and northern South America.

== Etymology ==
The specific name, spurrelli, is in honor of British zoologist Herbert George Flaxman Spurrell.

== Geographic range ==
Amphisbaena spurrelli is found in Colombia and Panama.

== Habitat ==
The preferred habitat of Amphisbaena spurrelli is forest at altitudes of 100–200 m (330–660 ft).

== Description ==
Amphisbaena spurrelli may attain a snout-to-vent length (SVL) of 30 cm (12 in), plus a tail 2.7 cm (1.1 in) long.

== Reproduction ==
Amphisbaena spurrelli is oviparous.
