= Cuban worm lizard =

Conservation status
- Least Concern (IUCN 3.1)

Scientific classification
- Kingdom: Animalia
- Phylum: Chordata
- Class: Reptilia
- Order: Squamata
- Clade: Amphisbaenia
- Family: Amphisbaenidae
- Genus: Amphisbaena
- Species: A. cubana

Binomial name
- Amphisbaena cubana Gundlach & Peters, 1879

Species of reptile

The Cuban worm lizard (Amphisbaena cubana) is a worm lizard species in the family Amphisbaenidae. It is endemic to Cuba.
