= Amphisbaena miringoera =

Scientific classification
- Domain: Eukaryota
- Kingdom: Animalia
- Phylum: Chordata
- Class: Reptilia
- Order: Squamata
- Clade: Amphisbaenia
- Family: Amphisbaenidae
- Genus: Amphisbaena
- Species: A. miringoera

Binomial name
- Amphisbaena miringoera Vanzolini, 1971

Species of lizard

Amphisbaena miringoera is a species of worm lizard found in Brazil.
