= White-headed worm lizard =

Scientific classification
- Kingdom: Animalia
- Phylum: Chordata
- Class: Reptilia
- Order: Squamata
- Clade: Amphisbaenia
- Family: Amphisbaenidae
- Genus: Amphisbaena
- Species: A. leucocephala

Binomial name
- Amphisbaena leucocephala Peters, 1878

Species of lizard

The white-headed worm lizard (Amphisbaena leucocephala) is a worm lizard species in the family Amphisbaenidae. It is found in Brazil and Uruguay.
