= Amphisbaena arenaria =

Scientific classification
- Domain: Eukaryota
- Kingdom: Animalia
- Phylum: Chordata
- Class: Reptilia
- Order: Squamata
- Clade: Amphisbaenia
- Family: Amphisbaenidae
- Genus: Amphisbaena
- Species: A. arenaria

Binomial name
- Amphisbaena arenaria Vanzolini, 1991

Species of lizard

Amphisbaena arenaria is a species of worm lizard found in Brazil.
