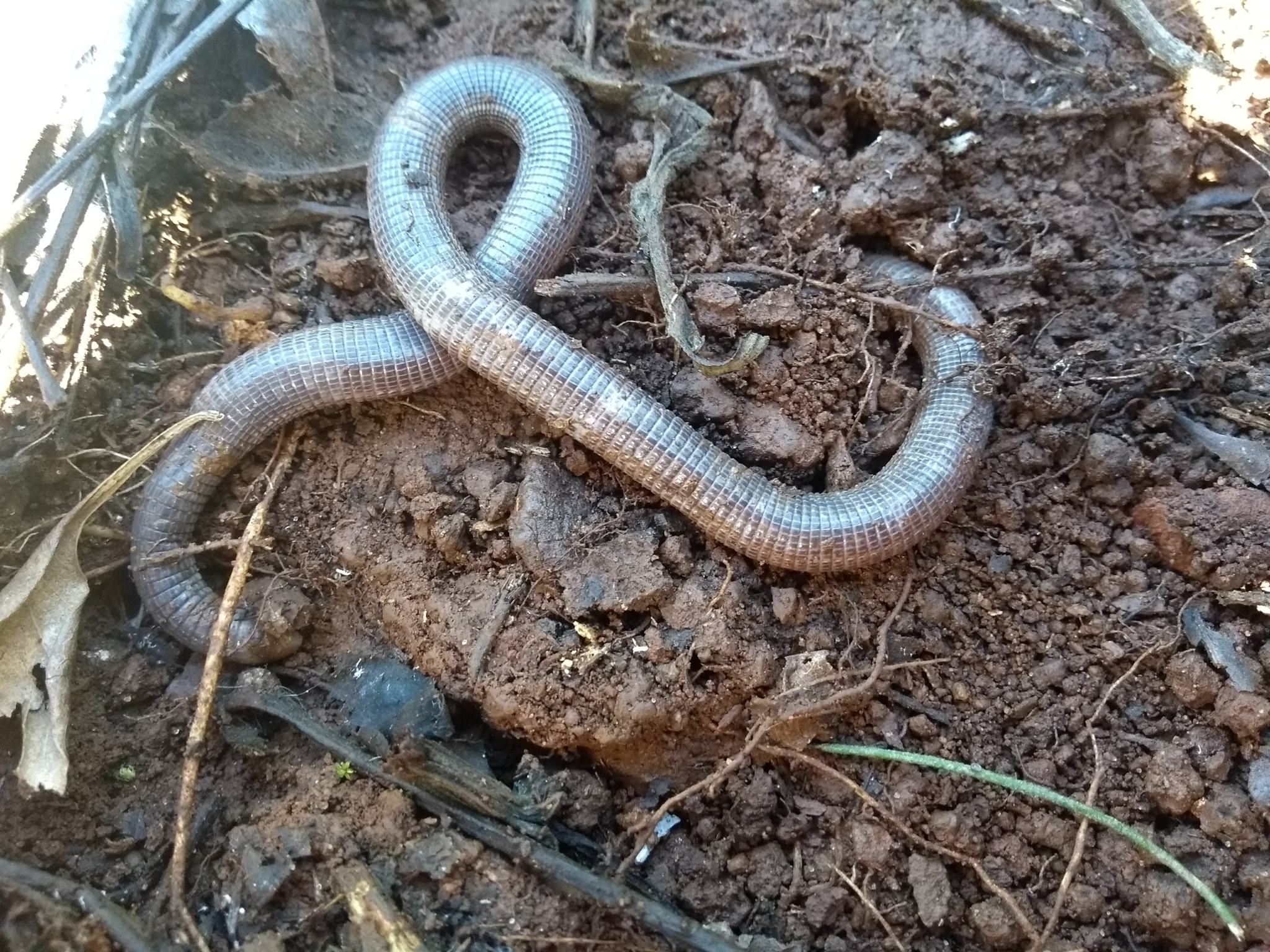
- Amphisbaena munoai

Conservation status
- Least Concern (IUCN 3.1)

Scientific classification
- Kingdom: Animalia
- Phylum: Chordata
- Class: Reptilia
- Order: Squamata
- Clade: Amphisbaenia
- Family: Amphisbaenidae
- Genus: Amphisbaena
- Species: A. munoai

Binomial name
- Amphisbaena munoai Klappenbach, 1960

= Munoa worm lizard =

Species of amphisbaenian

The Munoa worm lizard (Amphisbaena munoai) is a small species of amphisbaenian in the family Amphisbaenidae of the reptilian order Squamata. The species is native to southern South America.

== Etymology ==
The specific name, munoai, is in honor of Uruguayan zoologist Juan Ignacio Muñoa (1925–1960).

== Description ==
Amphisbaena munoai has a rounded head. The body annuli number 202–218, and the caudal annuli number 18–25. There are 10–14 segments in an annulus at midbody. There are four precloacal pores.

== Habitat ==
The preferred natural habitat of Amphisbaena munoai is grassland, at elevations of 100–500 m (330–1,640 ft).

== Behavior ==
Amphisbaena munoai is terrestrial and fossorial. It can be found hiding under stones or decomposing bark. Hiding under stones allows the amphisbaenian to raise its body temperature without exposing itself to predators.

== Diet ==
The main component of the diet of Amphisbaena munoai consists of termites, but it also consumes various types of small insect larvae.

== Reproduction ==
Amphisbaena munoai has a seasonal reproductive cycle. Females are able to be fertilized between June and October while males display a high testicle volume during this period. Females carry eggs from November to December and thus it is believed that copulation occurs from September to November. The eggs of A. munoai are frequently found in ant nests. Sexually mature males have a significantly smaller snout-vent length than sexually mature females.

== Geographic distribution ==
Amphisbaena munoai can be found in the pampas biome of southern Brazil, a temperate climate, and in Uruguay.
