= Amphisbaena ignatiana =

Scientific classification
- Domain: Eukaryota
- Kingdom: Animalia
- Phylum: Chordata
- Class: Reptilia
- Order: Squamata
- Clade: Amphisbaenia
- Family: Amphisbaenidae
- Genus: Amphisbaena
- Species: A. ignatiana

Binomial name
- Amphisbaena ignatiana Vanzolini, 1991

Species of lizard

Amphisbaena ignatiana is a species of worm lizards found in Brazil.
