= Loreto, Maranhão =

Coordinates: 7.08389°S 45.1408°W

Loreto
- Municipality
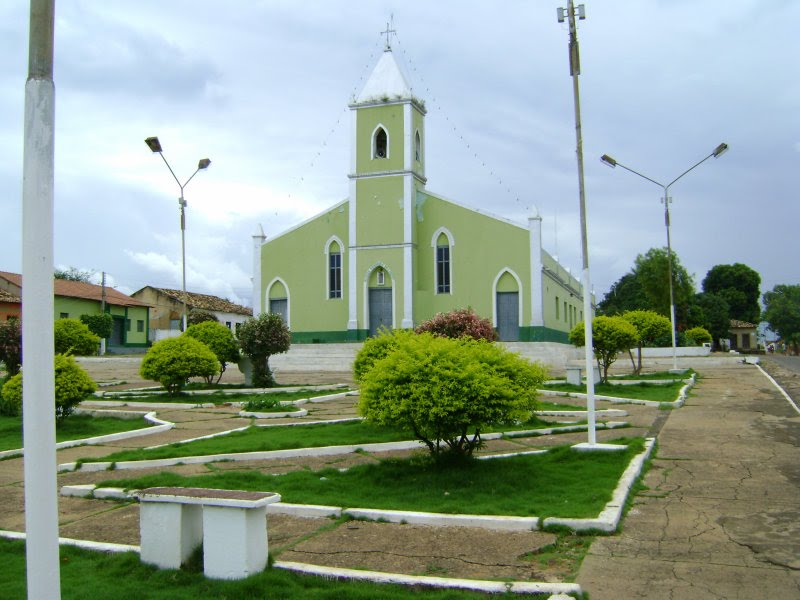
- Interactive map of Loreto
- Country: Brazil
- Region: Nordeste
- State: Maranhão
- Mesoregion: Sul Maranhense

Population (2020)
  - Total: 12,214
- Time zone: UTC−3 (BRT)

Loreto is a municipality in the state of Maranhão in the Northeast region of Brazil.

== See also ==
- List of municipalities in Maranhão
