= Amphisbaena acangaoba =

Scientific classification
- Kingdom: Animalia
- Phylum: Chordata
- Class: Reptilia
- Order: Squamata
- Clade: Amphisbaenia
- Family: Amphisbaenidae
- Genus: Amphisbaena
- Species: A. acangaoba

Binomial name
- Amphisbaena acangaoba Ribeiro, Gomides, & Costa, 2020

Species of lizard

Amphisbaena acangaoba, the helmeted worm lizard, is a worm lizard species in the family Amphisbaenidae.

== Distribution ==
It is endemic to Brazil.
