= Western worm lizard =

Conservation status
- Least Concern (IUCN 3.1)

Scientific classification
- Kingdom: Animalia
- Phylum: Chordata
- Class: Reptilia
- Order: Squamata
- Clade: Amphisbaenia
- Family: Amphisbaenidae
- Genus: Amphisbaena
- Species: A. occidentalis

Binomial name
- Amphisbaena occidentalis Cope, 1876

Species of lizard

The western worm lizard (Amphisbaena occidentalis) is a worm lizard species in the family Amphisbaenidae. It is endemic to Peru.
