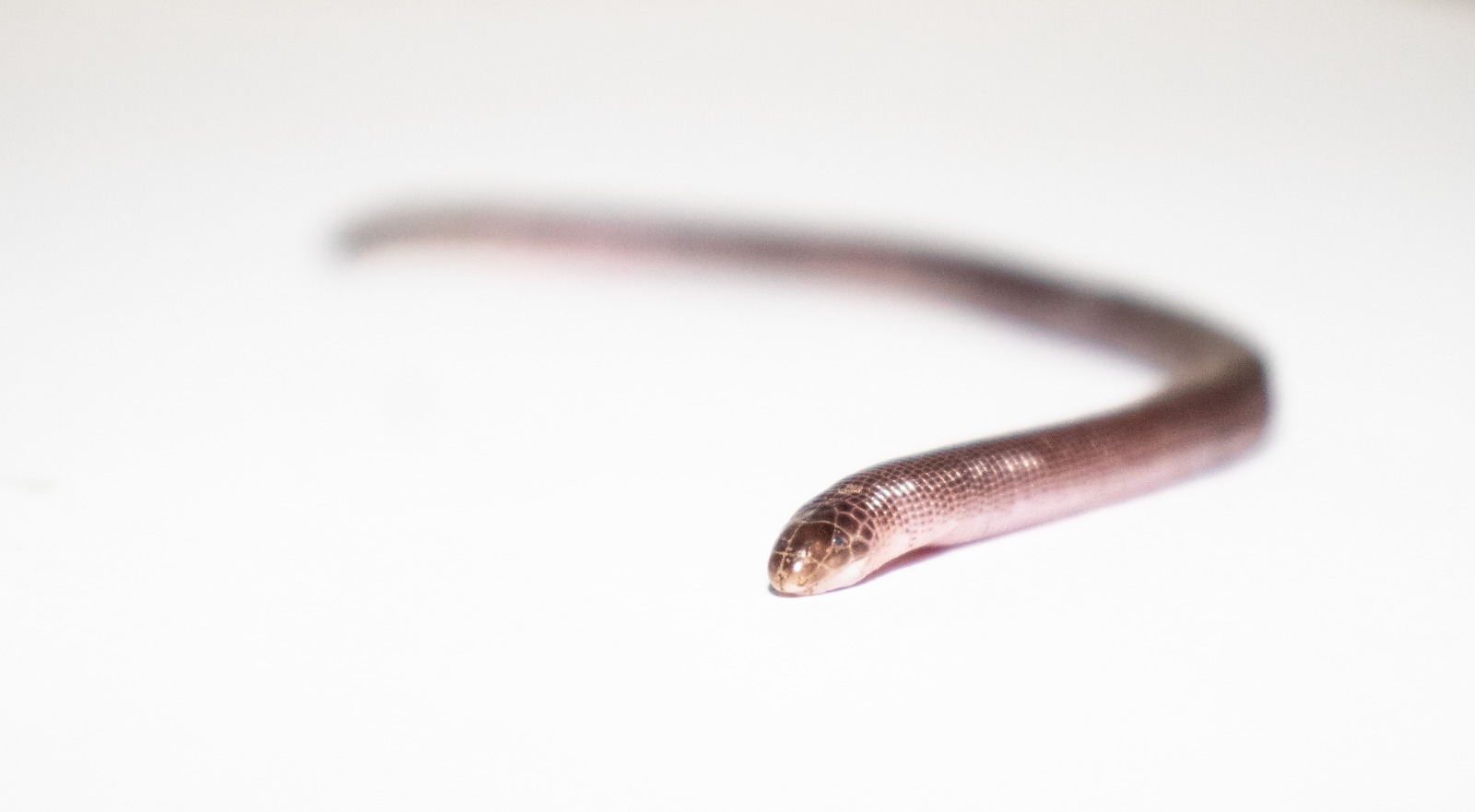
- Photograph of A. darwinii in controlled environment.

Conservation status
- Least Concern (IUCN 3.1)

Scientific classification
- Kingdom: Animalia
- Phylum: Chordata
- Class: Reptilia
- Order: Squamata
- Clade: Amphisbaenia
- Family: Amphisbaenidae
- Genus: Amphisbaena
- Species: A. darwinii

Binomial name
- Amphisbaena darwinii A.M.C. Duméril & Bibron, 1839

Synonyms
- Amphisbaena heterozonata Burmeister, 1861; Amphisbaena Mildei W. Peters, 1879; Amphisbaena trachura Cope, 1885

= Darwin's ringed worm lizard =

Species of amphibaenian

Darwin's ringed worm lizard (Amphisbaena darwinii) is a species of amphisbaenian in the family Amphisbaenidae. It is endemic to South America.

== Etymology ==
The specific name, darwinii, is in honor of English naturalist Charles Darwin.

== Description ==
Darwin's ringed worm lizard may attain a snout-to-vent length (SVL) of 36 cm (14 in).

== Distribution and habitat ==
Darwin's ringed worm lizard is found in Argentina, Brazil, Paraguay, and Uruguay. The preferred natural habitat is grassland.

== Ecology and behavior ==
Darwin's ringed worm lizard is fossorial and oviparous.
