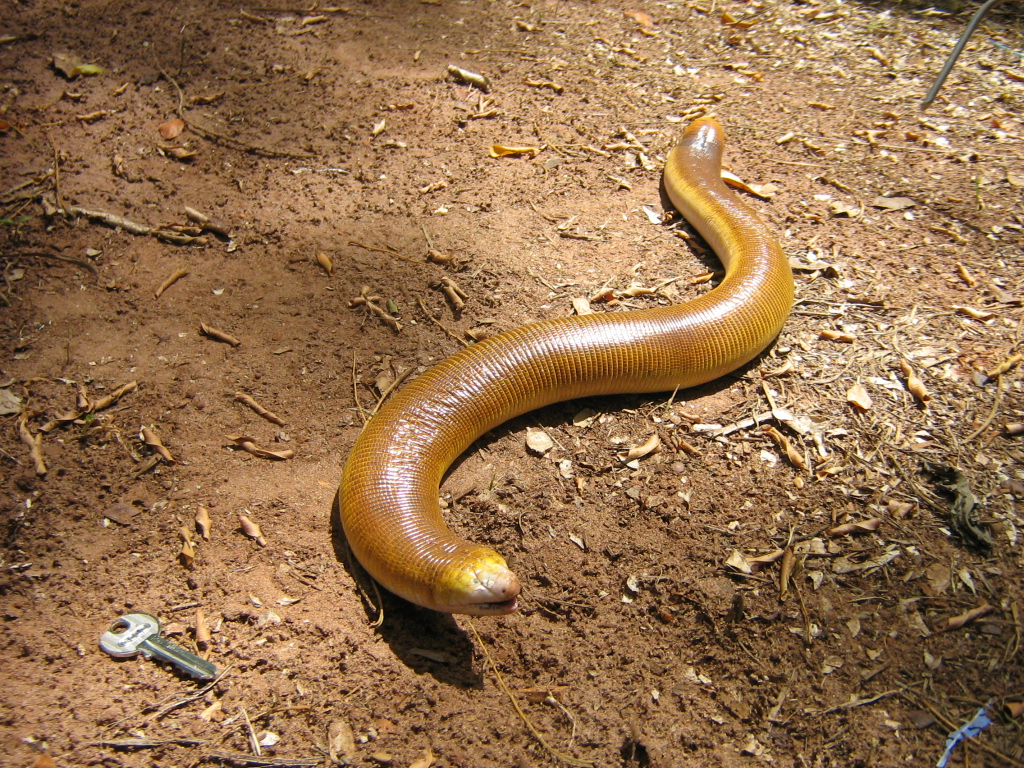
- Amphisbaena alba

Scientific classification
- Kingdom: Animalia
- Phylum: Chordata
- Class: Reptilia
- Order: Squamata
- Clade: Amphisbaenia
- Family: Amphisbaenidae
- Genus: Amphisbaena; Linnaeus, 1758

Species
- See text

Synonyms
- Anops, Aporarchus, Aulura, Bronia, Cephalopeltis, Cercolophia, Cynisca, Diphalus, Lepidosternon, Ophioproctus, Rhinoblanus, Sarea

= Amphisbaena (lizard) =

Genus of amphisbaenians

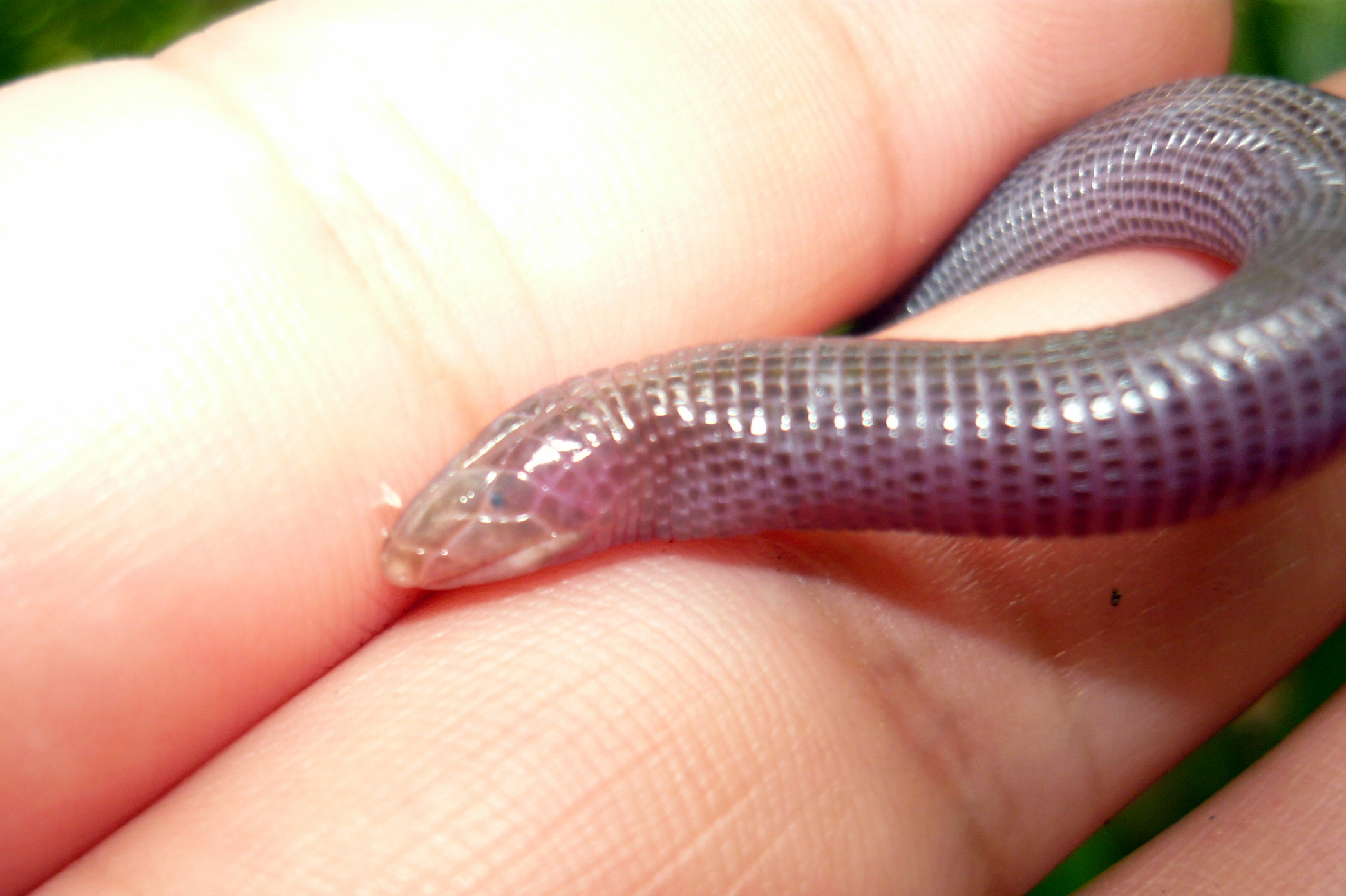
Amphisbaena caeca

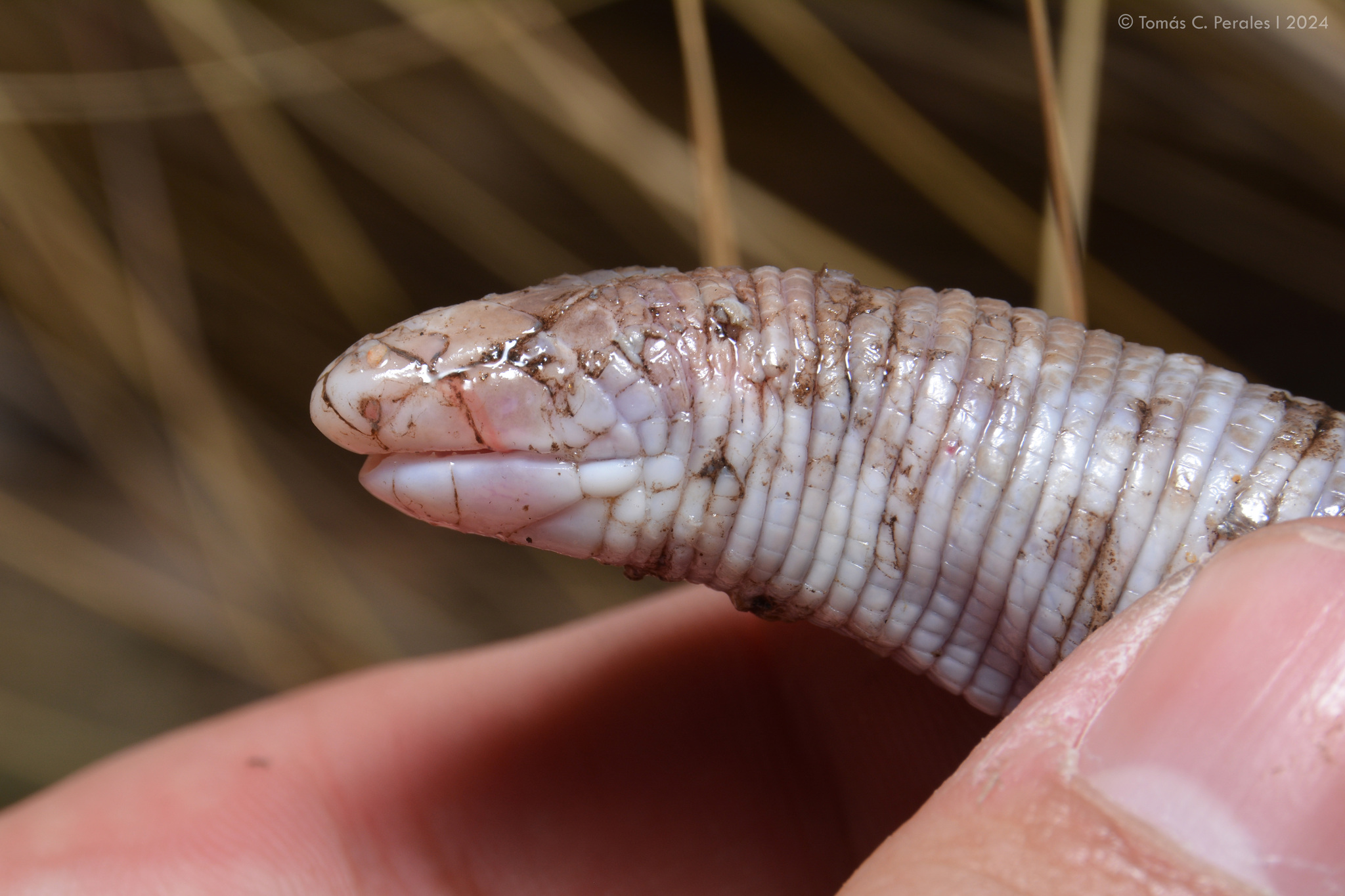
Amphisbaena darwinii

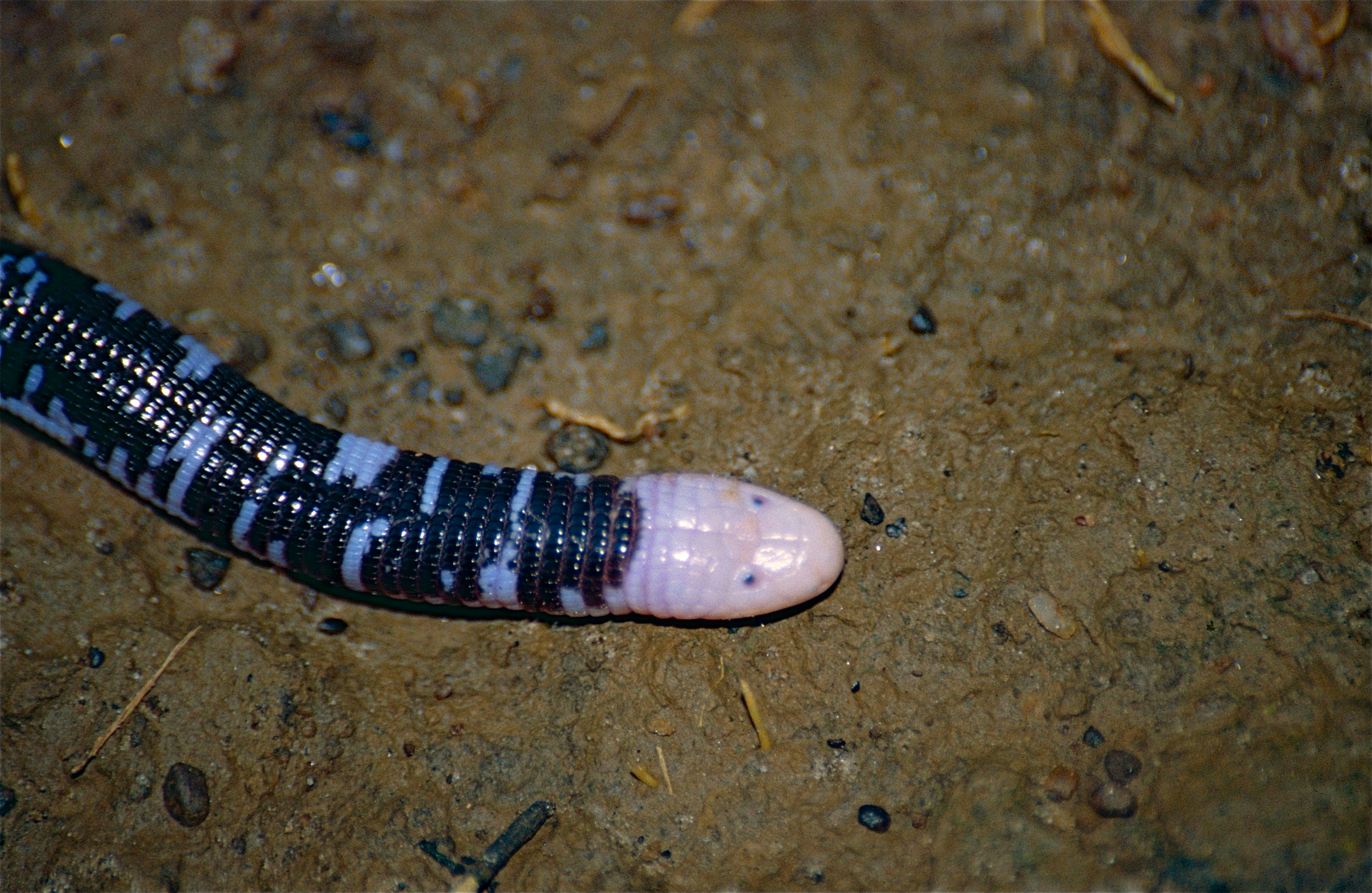
Amphisbaena fuliginosa

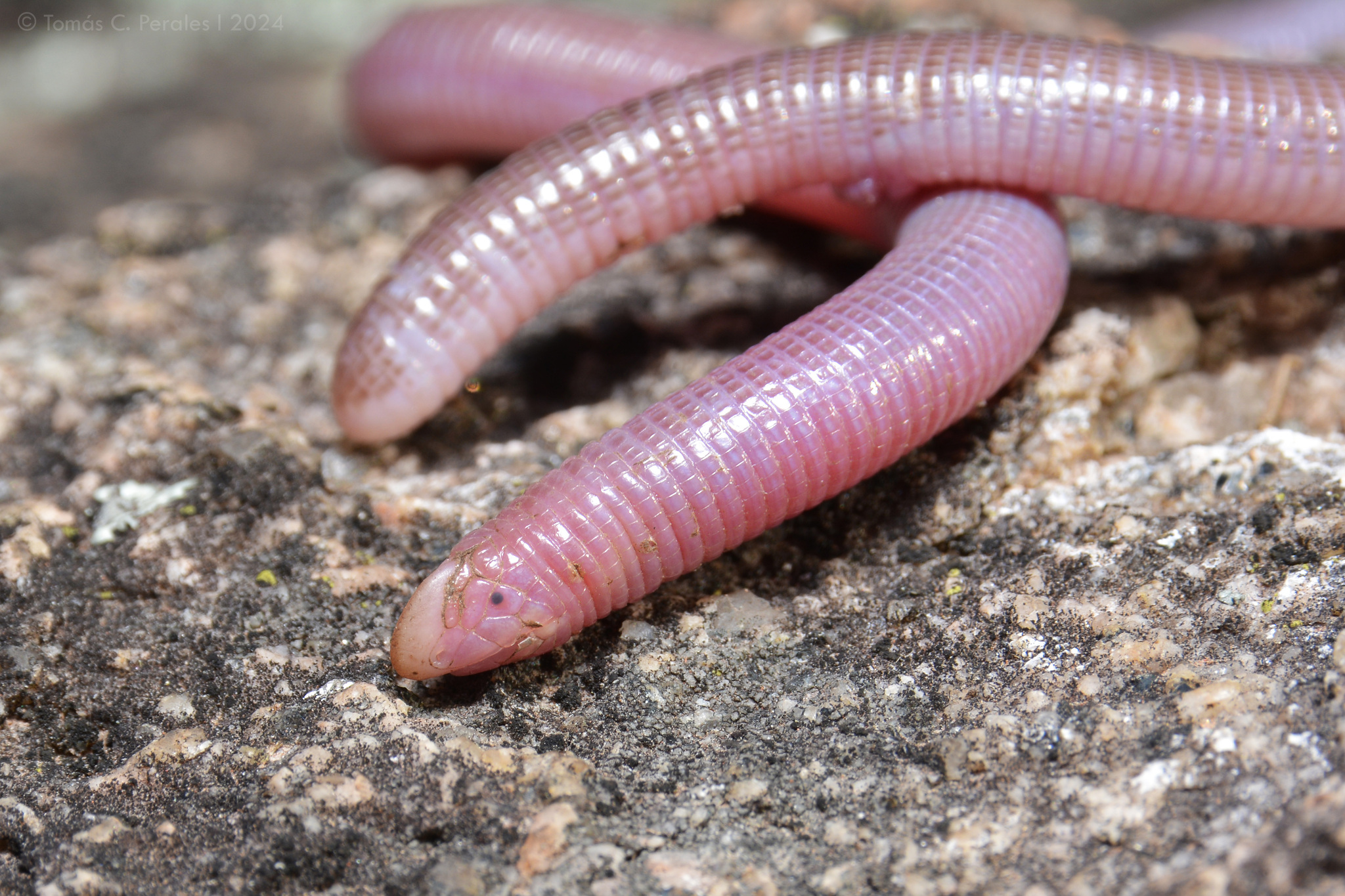
Amphisbaena kingii

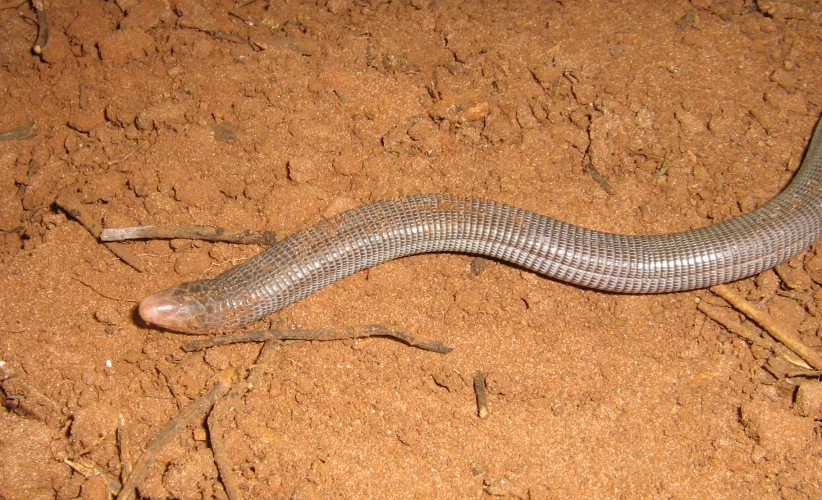
Amphisbaena mertensii

Amphisbaena is a genus in the family Amphisbaenidae, commonly known as worm lizards. Currently 102 species are placed in this diverse genus. They are legless, with ring-like scales, and highly reduced eyes. They are subterranean predators, feeding mainly on soil-dwelling invertebrates. They are native to South America and the Caribbean, specifically Panama and the Antilles.

== Species ==
Nota bene: A binomial authority in parentheses indicates that the species was originally described in a genus other than Amphisbaena.

- Amphisbaena absaberi (Strüssman & Carvalho, 2001)
- Amphisbaena acangaoba L. Ribeiro, Gomides & Costa, 2020
- Amphisbaena acrobeles (S. Ribeiro, Castro-Mello & Nogueira, 2009)
- Amphisbaena alba Linnaeus, 1758 – red worm lizard, white worm lizard, white-bellied worm lizard; type species
- Amphisbaena albocingulata Boettger, 1885
- Amphisbaena anaemariae Vanzolini, 1997
- Amphisbaena angustifrons Cope, 1861 – South American worm lizard
- Amphisbaena anomala (Barbour, 1914) – Barbour's worm lizard
- Amphisbaena arda Rodrigues, 2003
- Amphisbaena arenaria Vanzolini, 1991
- Amphisbaena arenicola Perez & Borges-Martins, 2019
- Amphisbaena bahiana Vanzolini, 1964
- Amphisbaena bakeri Stejneger, 1904 – Baker's worm lizard
- Amphisbaena barbouri Gans & Alexander, 1962 – Cuban many-ringed amphisbaena
- Amphisbaena bedai (Vanzolini, 1991)
- Amphisbaena bilabialata (Stimson, 1972)
- Amphisbaena bolivica Mertens, 1929
- Amphisbaena borelli Peracca, 1897
- Amphisbaena brasiliana (Gray, 1865) – Brazilian worm lizard
- Amphisbaena brevis Strüssmann & Mott, 2009
- Amphisbaena caeca Cuvier, 1829 – Puerto Rican worm lizard, blind worm lizard
- Amphisbaena caetitensis Almeida, Freitas, M. da Silva, Valverde, Rodrigues, Pires & Mott, 2018
- Amphisbaena caiari Teixeira, Dal Vechio, Neto & Rodrigues, 2014
- Amphisbaena camura Cope, 1862 – crooked worm lizard
- Amphisbaena carlgansi Thomas & Hedges, 1998 – Cuban pink amphisbaena
- Amphisbaena carli Pinna et al., 2010
- Amphisbaena carvalhoi Gans, 1965 – Carvalho worm lizard
- Amphisbaena caudalis Cochran, 1928 – Cayemite long-tailed amphisbaena
- Amphisbaena cayemite Thomas & Hedges, 2006 – Cayemite short-tailed amphisbaena
- Amphisbaena cegei Montero, Sáfadez & Álvarez, 1997
- Amphisbaena crisae Vanzolini, 1997
- Amphisbaena cubana Gundlach & W. Peters, 1879 – Cuban worm lizard
- Amphisbaena cuiabana (Strüssman & Carvalho, 2001)
- Amphisbaena cunhai Hoogmoed & Ávila-Pires, 1991
- Amphisbaena darwinii A.M.C. Duméril & Bibron, 1839 – Darwin's ringed worm lizard
- Amphisbaena dubia L. Müller, 1924 – uncertain worm lizard
- Amphisbaena elbakyanae Torres-Ramírez, Angarita-Sierra & Vargas-Ramírez, 2021
- Amphisbaena fenestrata (Cope, 1861) – Cope's worm lizard
- Amphisbaena filiformis S. Ribeiro, Gomes, Rodrigues, H. da Silva, Cintra & N. da Silva, 2016
- Amphisbaena frontalis Vanzolini, 1991
- Amphisbaena fuliginosa Linnaeus, 1758 – black and white worm lizard, speckled worm lizard, spotted worm lizard
- Amphisbaena gonavensis Gans & Alexander, 1962 – Gonâve worm lizard
- Amphisbaena gracilis Strauch, 1881 – slender worm lizard
- Amphisbaena hastata Vanzolini, 1991
- Amphisbaena heathi K. Schmidt, 1936 – Heath's worm lizard
- Amphisbaena hiata Montero & Céspedez, 2002
- Amphisbaena hogei Vanzolini, 1950 – Hoge's worm lizard
- Amphisbaena hoogmoedi Oliveira, Vaz-Silva, A. Santos, Graboski, Teixeira, Dal Vechio & S. Ribeiro, 2018
- Amphisbaena hyporissor Thomas, 1965 – Barahona amphisbaena
- Amphisbaena ignatiana Vanzolini, 1991
- Amphisbaena innocens Weinland, 1862 – innocent worm lizard
- Amphisbaena kingii (Bell, 1833) – King's worm lizard
- Amphisbaena kiriri L. Ribeiro, Gomides & Costa, 2018
- Amphisbaena kraoh (Vanzolini, 1971)
- Amphisbaena leali Thomas & Hedges, 2006 – Pestel amphisbaena
- Amphisbaena leeseri Gans, 1964 – Urucum worm lizard
- Amphisbaena leucocephala W. Peters, 1878 – white-headed worm lizard
- Amphisbaena littoralis Roberto, Brito & Ávila, 2014
- Amphisbaena longinqua Teixeira, Dal Vechio, Recoder, Cassimiro, de Sena & Rodrigues, 2019
- Amphisbaena lumbricalis Vanzolini, 1996
- Amphisbaena manni Barbour, 1914 – Mann's worm lizard
- Amphisbaena maranhensis Gomes & Maciel, 2012
- Amphisbaena mebengokre S. Ribeiro, Sá, Santos, Graboski, Zaher, Guedes, S. Andrade & Vaz-Silva, 2019
- Amphisbaena medemi Gans & Mathers, 1977
- Amphisbaena mertensii Strauch, 1881 – Mertens's worm lizard
- Amphisbaena metallurga Costa, Resende, Teixeira, Dal Vechio & Clemente, 2015
- Amphisbaena miringoera Vanzolini, 1971
- Amphisbaena mitchelli Procter, 1923 – Mitchell's worm lizard
- Amphisbaena mongoyo Teixeira, Dal Vechio, Recoder, Cassimiro, de Sena & Rodrigues, 2019
- Amphisbaena munoai Klappenbach, 1960 – Munoa worm lizard
- Amphisbaena myersi Hoogmoed, 1988
- Amphisbaena nana Perez & Borges-Martins, 2019
- Amphisbaena neglecta Dunn & Piatt, 1936 – neglected worm lizard
- Amphisbaena nigricauda Gans, 1966 – black-headed worm lizard
- Amphisbaena occidentalis Cope, 1876 – western worm lizard
- Amphisbaena pericensis Noble, 1921 – Perico worm lizard
- Amphisbaena persephone Pinna, Mendonça, Bocchiglieri & Fernandes, 2014
- Amphisbaena plumbea Gray, 1872 – lead worm lizard
- Amphisbaena polygrammica F. Werner, 1900 – Werner's worm lizard
- Amphisbaena pretrei A.M.C. Duméril & Bibron, 1839 – Rio Grande worm lizard
- Amphisbaena prunicolor (Cope, 1885) – plum-colored worm lizard
- Amphisbaena ridleyi Boulenger, 1890 – Ridley's worm lizard, Noronha worm lizard
- Amphisbaena roberti Gans, 1964
- Amphisbaena rozei Lancini, 1963 – Roze's worm lizard
- Amphisbaena sanctaeritae Vanzolini, 1994
- Amphisbaena saxosa (Castro-Mello, 2003)
- Amphisbaena schmidti Gans, 1964 – Schmidt's worm lizard, Tiburon stout anole, Puerto Rican dusky amphisbaena
- Amphisbaena silvestrii Boulenger, 1902 – Silvestri's worm lizard
- Amphisbaena slateri Boulenger, 1907 – Slater's worm lizard
- Amphisbaena slevini K. Schmidt, 1938 – Slevin's worm lizard
- Amphisbaena spurrelli Boulenger, 1915 – Spurrell's worm lizard
- Amphisbaena steindachneri Strauch, 1881
- Amphisbaena stejnegeri Ruthven, 1922 – Stejneger's worm lizard
- Amphisbaena supernumeraria Mott, Rodrigues & E. dos Santos, 2009
- Amphisbaena talisiae Vanzolini, 1995
- Amphisbaena tiaraju Perez & Borges-Martins, 2019
- Amphisbaena townsendi Stejneger, 1911
- Amphisbaena tragorrhectes Vanzolini, 1971
- Amphisbaena uroxena Mott et al., 2008
- Amphisbaena vanzolinii Gans, 1963 – Vanzolini's worm lizard
- Amphisbaena vermicularis Wagler, 1824 – Wagler's worm lizard
- Amphisbaena xera Thomas, 1966 – dry worm lizard, Puerto Rican dryland worm lizard, North American worm lizard

Nota bene: A binomial authority in parentheses indicates that the species was originally described in a genus other than Amphisbaena.

== Etymology ==
The specific names carlgansi, carli, and cegei are all in honor of American herpetologist Carl Gans (1923–2009), for his contributions to the knowledge of Amphisbaenians.

== See also ==
- List of reptiles of Brazil
- Sineoamphisbaena
