= Archaerhineura =

Archaerhineura Temporal range: Paleocene, 57 Ma

Scientific classification
- Kingdom: Animalia
- Phylum: Chordata
- Class: Reptilia
- Order: Squamata
- Suborder: Lacertoidea
- Clade: Amphisbaenia
- Family: Rhineuridae
- Genus: †Archaerhineura; Longrich et al., 2015

Type species
- †Archaerhineura mephitis Longrich et al., 2015

Extinct genus of lizards

Archaerhineura was a genus of amphisbaenian lizards in the family Rhineuridae that is now extinct. The only species is Archaerhineura mephitis, named in 2015 on the basis of a single fragment of the lower jaw from the Polecat Bench Formation in Park County, Wyoming, which dates to the late Paleocene (about 57 to 58 million years ago). Archaerhineura is one of the oldest amphisbaenians and was part of an evolutionary radiation of Rhineuridae in the Paleocene several million years after the Cretaceous–Paleogene extinction event (the only surviving member of Rhineuridae is Rhineura floridana, which lives in Florida). This rhineurid radiation coincided with the radiation of another group of amphisbaenians, Amphisbaeniformes, which includes the still-extant families Blanidae and Amphisbaenidae. The presence of Archaerhineura and other Paleocene rhineurids in the western United States indicates that amphisbaenians, which would later have a nearly global distribution, originated in North America.

Below is a cladogram showing the phylogenetic relationships of Archaerhineura and other amphisbaenians:

- Amphisbaenia
  - Rhineuridae
    - †Plesiorhineura tsentasai
    - †Archaerhineura mephitis
    - - †Jepsibaena minor
      - - - †Spathorhynchus natronicus
          - - - †Spathorhynchus fossorium
              - †Dyticonastis rensbergeri
            - - †Hyporhina antiqua
              - - †Hyporhina tertia
                - †Hyporhina galbreathi
        - - †Hadrorhineura hibbardi
          - †Rhineura wilsoni
          - UCM skull
          - - †Protorhineura hatcherii
            - - †Rhineura sepultra
              - - †Rhineura marslandensis
                - Rhineura floridana
  - - †Chthonophidae
      Chthonophis subterraneus
    - - †Oligodontosaurus spp.
      - Amphisbaeniformes
        - - Blanidae
          - - †Anniealexandria gansi
            - Bipes spp.
        - - Cadea blanoides
          - - †Todrasaurus gheerbrandti
            - Afrobaenia
              - - Trogonophis wiegmanni
                - - Diplometopon zarudnyi
                  - Agamodon anguliceps
              - Amphisbaenidae
