= Macrorhineura =

Macrorhineura Temporal range: Early Miocene

Scientific classification
- Domain: Eukaryota
- Kingdom: Animalia
- Phylum: Chordata
- Class: Reptilia
- Order: Squamata
- Clade: Amphisbaenia
- Family: Rhineuridae
- Genus: †Macrorhineura; MacDonald, 1970

Type species
- †Macrorhineura skinneri MacDonald, 1970

Extinct genus of lizards

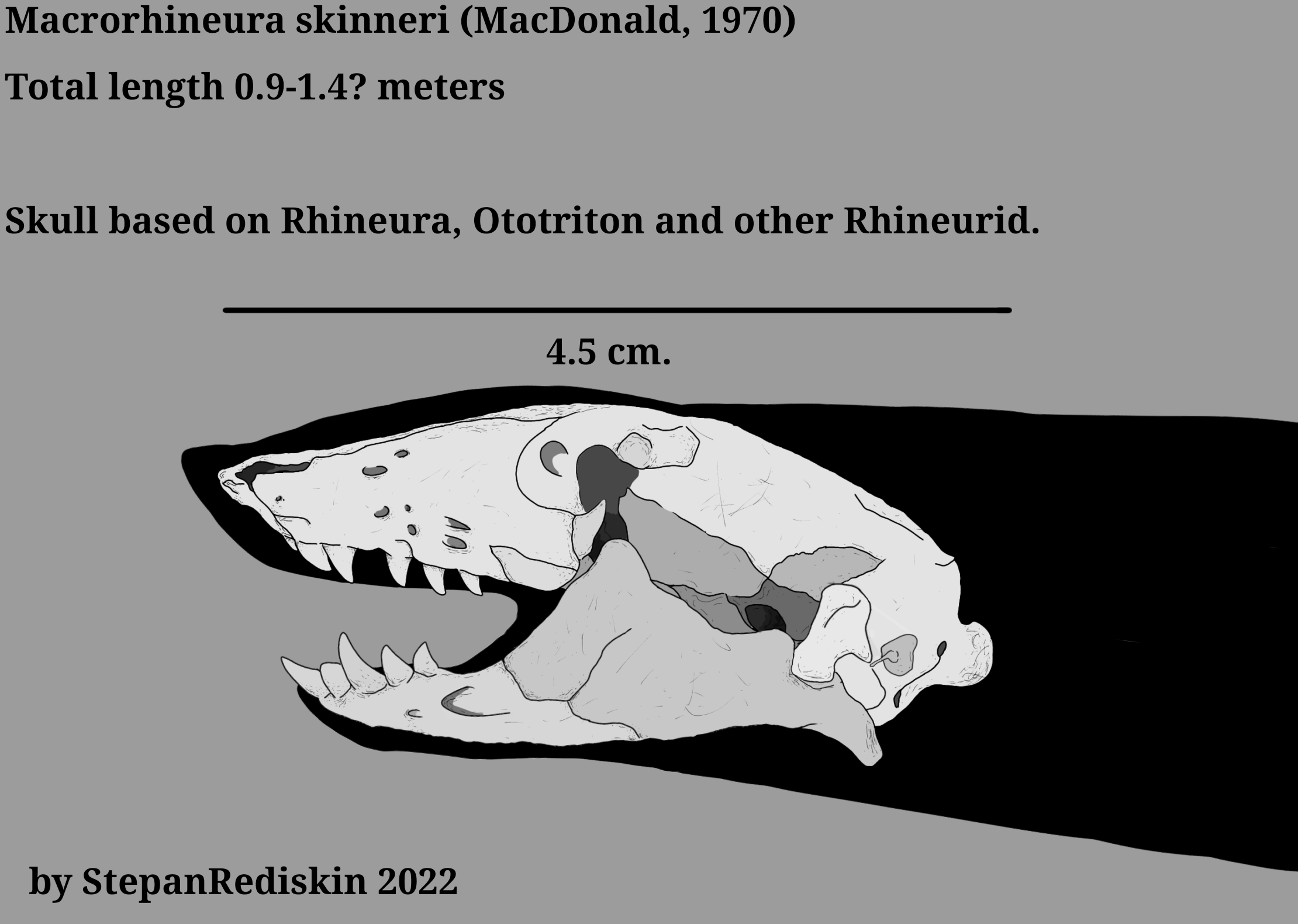
Macrorhineura skinneri

Macrorhineura is an extinct genus of rhineurid amphisbaenian or worm lizard, including the type and only species Macrorhineura skinneri, named in 1970 on the basis of the front half of a skull from the Early Miocene Sharps Formation in Wounded Knee, South Dakota. Although the skull is incomplete, features such as a pointed, shovel-shaped snout indicate that it belongs to the family Rhineuridae. Within Rhineuridae, Macrorhineura is most closely related to Ototriton and Hyporhina, two genera from the Eocene and Oligocene of Colorado and Wyoming, based on the shared feature of equally sized dentary teeth in the lower jaw. Together they form a clade or evolutionary grouping of mid-continental rhineurids, which became isolated from a more western clade of rhineurids that includes Dyticonastis and Spathorhynchus. Rhineurids were relatively common across much of North America during the Paleogene, but their range contracted in the Neogene as the climate became colder, leaving only one living species in Florida, Rhineura floridana. The presence of Macrorhineura in the Miocene shows that mid-continental rhineurids persisted into the Neogene, although by this time their distribution range was already shrinking.
