= Anniealexandria =

Anniealexandria Temporal range: Early Eocene

Scientific classification
- Kingdom: Animalia
- Phylum: Chordata
- Class: Reptilia
- Order: Squamata
- Suborder: Lacertoidea
- Clade: Amphisbaenia
- Family: Bipedidae
- Genus: †Anniealexandria; Smith, 2009

Type species
- †Anniealexandria gansi Smith, 2009

Extinct genus of lizards

Anniealexandria is an extinct genus of amphisbaenian lizard known by the type species Anniealexandria gansi from the earliest Eocene of Wyoming. Anniealexandria is the only known member of the family Bipedidae in the fossil record, which otherwise only includes the extant genus Bipes from Mexico. It was named in 2009 in honor of Annie Montague Alexander, founder of the University of California Museum of Paleontology. Remains of Anniealexandria are known only from a single fossil locality in the Bighorn Basin called Castle Gardens, but within the locality its fossils are common in the Willwood Formation, usually consisting of isolated jaw bones and vertebrae. Anniealexandria seems to have been a common component of a paleofauna that included fifteen other lizard species and existed in western North America during a period of global warming in the latest Paleocene and earliest Eocene.

Below is a cladogram from Longrich et al. (2015) showing the phylogenetic relationships of Anniealexandria:

- Amphisbaenia
  - Rhineuridae
  - - †Chthonophidae
      Chthonophis subterraneus
    - - †Oligodontosaurus spp.
      - Amphisbaeniformes
        - - Blanidae
          - - †Anniealexandria gansi
            - Bipes spp.
        - - Cadea blanoides
          - - †Todrasaurus gheerbrandti
            - Afrobaenia
              - - Trogonophis wiegmanni
                - - Diplometopon zarudnyi
                  - Agamodon anguliceps
              - Amphisbaenidae
