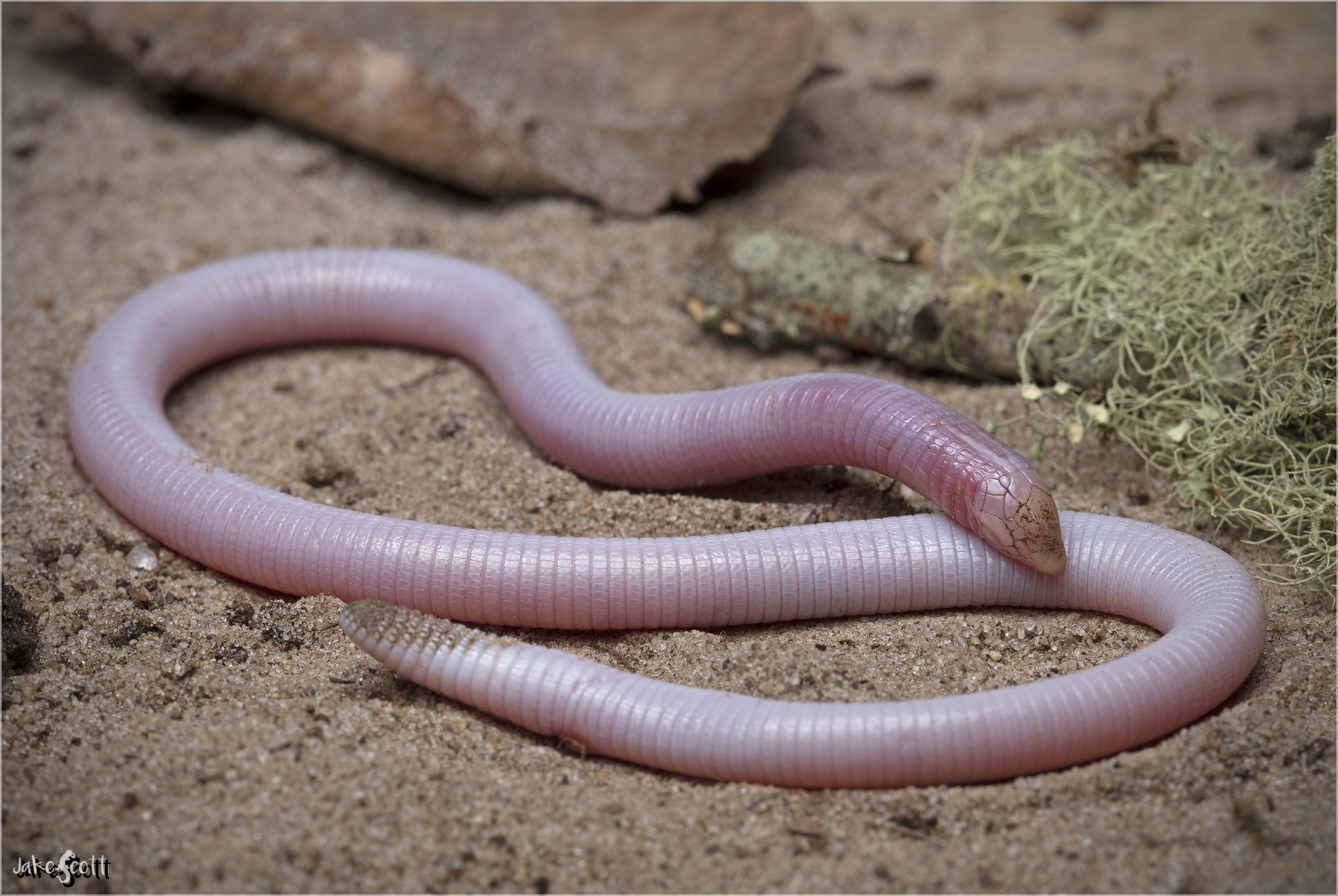
- Rhineura floridana

Scientific classification
- Kingdom: Animalia
- Phylum: Chordata
- Class: Reptilia
- Order: Squamata
- Clade: Amphisbaenia
- Family: Rhineuridae; Vanzolini, 1951

Genera
- †Archaerhineura †Dyticonastis †Hadrorhineura †Hyporhina †Jepsibaena †Macrorhineura †Ototriton †Plesiorhineura †Protorhineura; Rhineura †Spathorhynchus

= Rhineuridae =

Rhineurids Temporal range: Paleocene - Present, 60–0 Ma

Family of amphisbaenians

Rhineuridae is a family of amphisbaenians (commonly called worm lizards) that includes one living genus and species, Rhineura floridana, as well as many extinct species belonging to both Rhineura and several extinct genera. The living R. floridana is found only in Georgia and Florida, but extinct species ranged across North America, some occurring as far west as Oregon. The family has a fossil record stretching back 60 million years to the Paleocene and was most diverse in the continental interior during the Eocene and Oligocene.

== Fossil record ==
The fossil record of the Rhineuridae extends back almost to the Mesozoic, with the oldest rhineurid, Plesiorhineura tsentasai, occurring in the Early Paleocene. Plesiorhineura is only known from a partial jaw, but it shares many features with modern rhineurids. Eocene rhineurids, such as Spathorhynchus fossorium, are remarkably similar to the modern Rhineura, suggesting very conservative evolution within the family. Unlike the Amphisbaenidae, which include round-headed, keeled, and shovel-snouted forms, the fossil rhineurids are exclusively of the shovel-snouted variety. The fossil rhineurids are known exclusively from North America, but show that the group once had a much wider distribution than the current range of R. floridana, with species known from Colorado, Wyoming, South Dakota, Montana, and as far west as Oregon. The wide distribution probably reflects the fact that the climate was much warmer in the past. The initial rhineurid radiation in North America occurred when most of the continent was humid and subtropical. Rhineurids persisted through a significant climatic transition around the time of the Eocene-Oligocene boundary in which most of North America became semi-arid and covered by savannas. The decline of rhineurids began with an abrupt period of cooling called Middle Miocene disruption. The distribution range of rhineurids shrank southward as global temperatures continued to fall, leaving R. floridana isolated in Florida as the only living representative of the group.

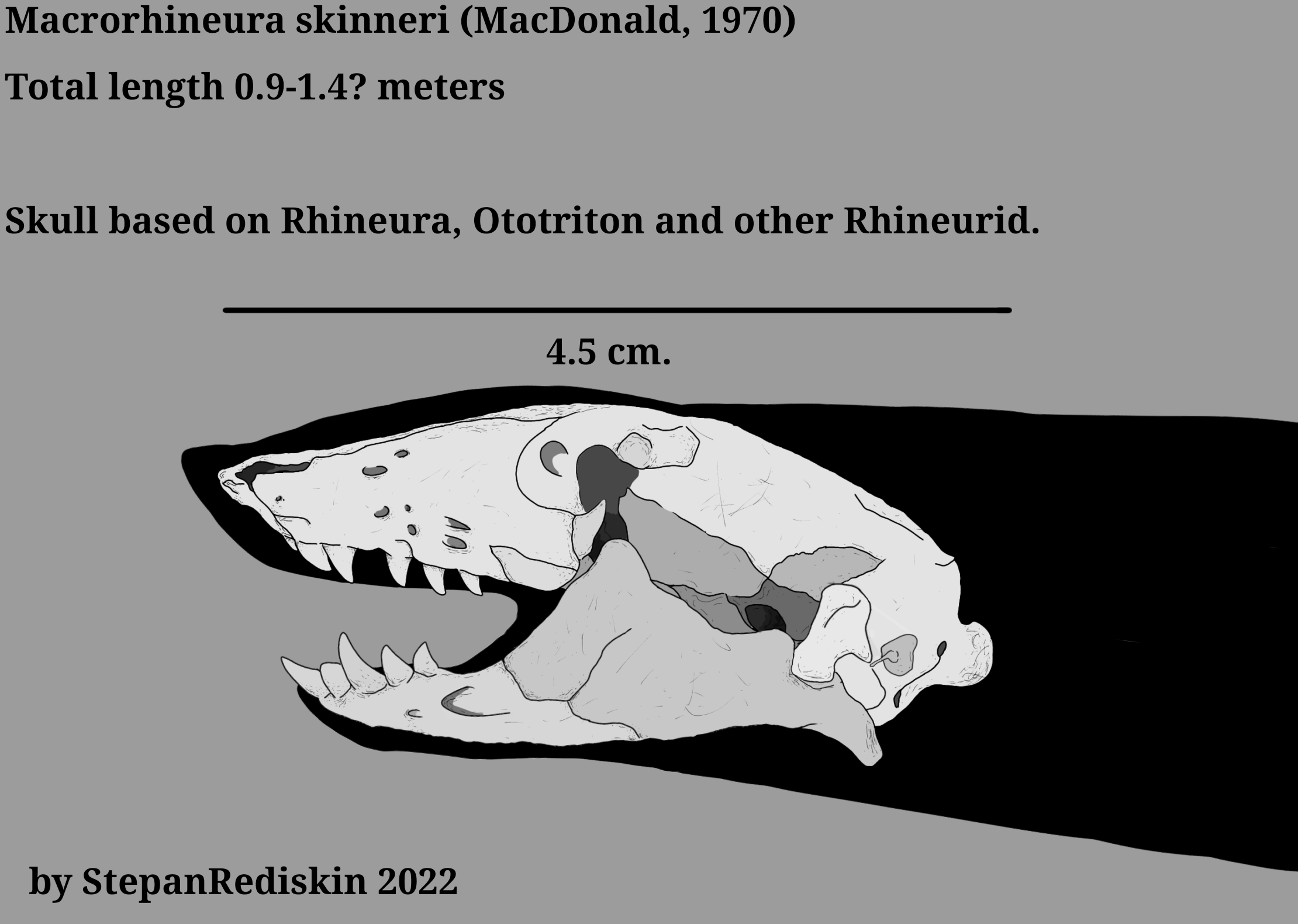
Macrorhineura skinneri from the early Miocene

In 2007, paleontologist Daniel Hembree reviewed all North American fossil amphisbaenians and found every species to belong to Rhineuridae. He also showed that many extinct rhineurids cannot be justified as their own species and are instead synonyms of earlier named species, reducing the number of valid species from twenty-two to nine. For example, Jepsibaena minor, Rhineura amblyceps, R. attenuatus R. minutus, and R. wilsoni are sometimes considered synonyms of Protorhineura hatchetri. Since the late nineteenth century, paleontologists had been naming new species of extinct North American amphisbaenians on the basis of single fragmentary specimens that often preserved too few anatomical features to support their status as distinct species. By synonymizing many of these species, Hembree showed that rhineurid diversity in North America was lower than once thought.

== Relationships ==
Hembree's 2007 review of North American amphisbaenians also included a phylogenetic analysis of rhineurids and other amphisbaenian lizards. The analysis found that Rhineura floridana is the sister lineage to all other species in the family. The species itself is quite young, with the oldest fossils coming from the Pleistocene of Florida. The ancestor of R. floridana likely migrated into what is now Florida from the continental interior, while the remaining rhineurids remained in the continental interior, where they radiated and diversified.

- Amphisbaenia
  - Bipes biporus (Bipedidae)
  - - Blanus cinereus (Blanidae)
    - - Amphisbaena alba (Amphisbaenidae)
      - - Trogonophis wiegmanni (Trogonophidae)
        - Rhineuridae
          - Rhineura floridana
          - - †Hadrorhineura hibbardi
            - - †Protorhineura hatcherii
              - - - †Dyticonastis rensbergeri
                  - - †Spathorhynchus fossorium
                    - †Spathorhynchus natronicus
                - - †Macrorhineura skinneri
                  - - †Ototriton solidus
                    - - †Hyporhina galbreathi
                      - †Hyporhina antiqua
