= Chthonophis =

Chthonophis Temporal range: Early Paleocene

Scientific classification
- Kingdom: Animalia
- Phylum: Chordata
- Class: Reptilia
- Order: Squamata
- Suborder: Lacertoidea
- Clade: Amphisbaenia
- Family: †Chthonophidae; Longrich et al., 2015
- Genus: †Chthonophis; Longrich et al., 2015

Type species
- †Chthonophis subterraneus Longrich et al., 2015

Extinct genus of lizards

Chthonophis (meaning "snake beneath the earth", from the Greek chthonios ("beneath the earth") and ophis ("snake")) is an extinct genus of amphisbaenian lizard with only one known species, Chthonophis subterraneus, from the earliest Paleocene of northeastern Montana. Chthonophis was named in 2015 on the basis of a partial lower jaw from an outcrop of the Fort Union Formation in the Bug Creek Anthills. The surfaces of the bone are well-rounded, suggesting that the remains had been partially digested by another animal before the jaw had been buried and fossilized. Chthonophis is the oldest known amphisbaenian, yet phylogenetic analysis shows that it was not the most basal. Longrich et al. (2015) classified Chthonophis in its own family, Chthonophidae, finding it to be more derived than Rhineuridae but more basal than other clades such as Blanidae and Amphisbaenidae (which together make up Amphisbaeniformes). The existence of a derived amphisbaenian soon after the Cretaceous-Paleogene extinction event suggests that Amphisbaenia has its origins in the Cretaceous, although no Cretaceous amphisbaenians are currently known. Below is a cladogram from Longrich et al. (2015) showing the phylogenetic relationships of Chthonophis:

- Amphisbaenia
  - Rhineuridae
  - - †Chthonophidae
      Chthonophis subterraneus
    - - †Oligodontosaurus spp.
      - Amphisbaeniformes
        - - Blanidae
          - - †Anniealexandria gansi
            - Bipes spp.
        - - Cadea blanoides
          - - †Todrasaurus gheerbrandti
            - Afrobaenia
              - - Trogonophis wiegmanni
                - - Diplometopon zarudnyi
                  - Agamodon anguliceps
              - Amphisbaenidae
