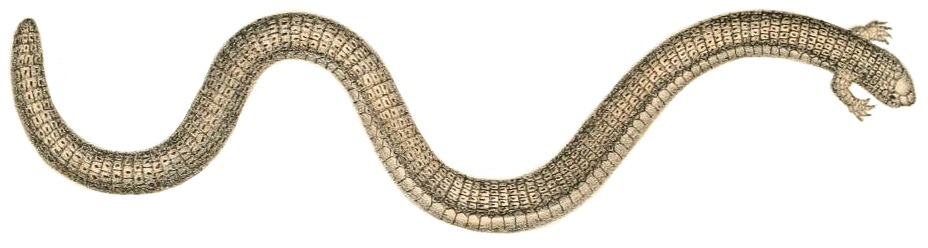

Conservation status
- Least Concern (IUCN 3.1)

Scientific classification
- Kingdom: Animalia
- Phylum: Chordata
- Class: Reptilia
- Order: Squamata
- Clade: Amphisbaenia
- Family: Bipedidae
- Genus: Bipes
- Species: B. canaliculatus

Binomial name
- Bipes canaliculatus Latreille, 1801

= Four-toed worm lizard =

Species of lizard

The four-toed worm lizard (Bipes canaliculatus) is a worm lizard species in the family Bipedidae. It is endemic to Mexico.
