= The Creature Cases =

Animated television series

- Season 1 promotional poster; featuring Kit Casey (left) and Sam Snow (right)
- Genre: Preschool; Action; Comedy
- Created by: Gabe Pulliam
- Developed by: Adam Idelson; Bryan Korn; Amy Koudelka; Kurt Mueller; Gabe Pulliam; Alex Red
- Voices of: Nneka Okoye; Shash Hira; Teresa Gallagher
- Theme music composer: Mark Mothersbaugh; Bob Mothersbaugh
- Composers: Richie Kohan (score); Bob Mothersbaugh (songs)
- Countries of origin: United States; France; China
- Original language: English
- No. of seasons: 7
- No. of episodes: 59 (37 segments)

Production
- Executive producers: Adam Idelson; Kurt Mueller; Gabe Pulliam (2024–present)
- Producers: Rachel Simon (2022–2023); Steve Jacobson (2024–present); Michelle Papandrew; Guillaume Hellouin; Caroline Souris; Marco Balsamo (2025–present); Tara Sibel Demren (2025–present); Jay Oliva (2025–present)
- Editors: Etienne Jeantet; Malek Mroueh
- Running time: 16–29 minutes
- Production companies: TeamTO (Note: Executive production and animation services.); Sony Pictures Television Kids (Note: Credited as Silvergate Media (2022–2023).); Tencent Video Productions (2022–2023; 2025–present)

Original release
- Network: Netflix (worldwide); Tencent Video (China)
- Release: April 12, 2022 – present

The Creature Cases is an animated preschool children's television series created by Gabe Pulliam for Netflix. Produced by Sony Pictures Television Kids (formerly Silvergate Media) and animated by TeamTO, the series premiered on April 12, 2022. A holiday special, labeled as Chapter 2, was released on November 30, 2022. The third chapter was released on May 22, 2023. The fourth chapter was released on November 25, 2024. The fifth chapter was released on June 9, 2025. The sixth chapter was released on December 15, 2025. The seventh chapter was released on February 9, 2026.

The series made its 8-episode linear debut on Nickelodeon for four weeks throughout July 2024 beginning July 1.

== Synopsis ==
The series takes place in a world of anthropomorphic animals and follows the adventures of Sam Snow and Kit Casey, two agents employed by the Covert League of Animal Detective Experts (or C.L.A.D.E. for short), as they travel around the world solving many mysteries while using their expertise in problem-solving and animal facts.

== Characters ==
=== Main ===
- Sam Snow (voiced by Shash Hira) - a silver snow leopard with an English accent and Kit's partner. A neat freak by nature and always out for clues and gizmos, Sam is a master detective and tends to be the one to analyze the situation at hand. Sam's last name is likely a play on the fact that snow leopards often live in frigid, snowy climates. True to his species, Sam dislikes getting wet and thrives in cold, snowy weather, though unlike Kit he is less than agile and often stumbles during most chases, despite being the more cautious of the two. Sam's main gadget is a glove that performs similarly to Kit's visor, but he is also responsible for carrying the Clu-Bots: small spherical robots that can transform for many different purposes. His catchphrases are "Whiskers, that's it!" and "Whiskers!".
- Kit Casey (voiced by Nneka Okoye) - a yellow kit fox with an American accent and Sam's partner. Her name is likely a play on the name of her species and the fact that baby foxes are called kits. Unlike her partner, Kit is naturally a total slob and never misses a chance to snack when possible, though despite being a worse detective than Sam, she more than makes up for it with her vast knowledge of the various animal species they encounter. Unlike Sam, Kit doesn't mind getting wet and is far more reckless, and true to the nature of her species, she thrives in warmer, tropical weather. Despite her brave and confident personality, in "The Secret of the Sand Serpent", it's revealed that Kit is terrified of vacuum cleaners, similar to a dog. Kit's main gadget is a visor that performs similarly to Sam's glove, but she also carries around a pen and notebook to draw out details on the latest suspect. Her catchphrases are "What in the woolly world?", "Twist my tail", "Don't get your tail twisted", and "Ain't that something."
- Peggy Scratch (voiced by Teresa Gallagher) - a brown chicken and the director of C.L.A.D.E. While she puts up a serious and professional front, Director Scratch is just as eccentric as her employees, and not above their levels of fun and frivolities. Although she rarely leaves HQ on missions, Scratch is very accomplished and very competent in the field, being an accomplished egg bowler on top of managing case files in her office. Her catchphrase before sending the two agents down is "C.L.A.D.E. is counting on you!".
- Bill and Jill (voiced by Darren Foreman and Harriet Carmichael) - a pair of mice who make up a duo known as the Mice Squad. Typically based in a miniature news van, the Mice Squad is responsible for alerting C.L.A.D.E. agents of missions requiring intervention. The pair are also professional musicians, with many followers due to the quality of their soundtracks. Both of them also feature in the end-of-episode "Fact File" segments alongside R.O.N., where they examine facts about the episode's featured animals.
- R.O.N. (voiced by Rob Rackstraw) - an artificially intelligent jet plane who serves as Sam and Kit's primary transport. R.O.N. stands for "Robotic Onboard Navigator" and is an advanced flying machine equipped with various features to aid in their missions. R.O.N. has its own personality and often engages in playful banter with Sam and Kit. It has a dry sense of humor and tends to provide witty remarks during their adventures. R.O.N. can transform into different modes, including a jet mode for high-speed travel, a stealth mode for undercover operations, and a surveillance mode for gathering information. It possesses advanced technology like holographic displays and state-of-the-art navigation systems. R.O.N. is a reliable and valuable asset to the team, ensuring that Sam and Kit reach their destinations quickly and safely.
- Clu-Bots are an invention by the Stinkwells and one of the most used technology on The Creature Cases. They are used by Sam Snow to check footprints, scan things, and gather information.

=== Recurring ===
- Hans and Harold Stinkwell (voiced by Rob Rackstraw) - two German-accented skunk brothers who serve as C.L.A.D.E.'s mechanical experts. In addition to maintaining equipment around HQ, the Stinkwells are responsible for developing new inventions that allow the agents to carry out their missions as best as possible. A running gag in the series is that as skunks, a number of their inventions tend to smell bad, and typically, at least one of the brothers will fart whenever they appear on screen. Unlike Sam, Kit, R.O.N., Director Scratch, and the Mice Squad, the Stinkwells do not appear or speak in every episode, appearing only as semi-regulars.
- Wally Bungler (voiced by Rob Rackstraw) - a brown flying squirrel and self-proclaimed "Nature Ranger" who travels around the world to help out wherever he can. While Sam and Kit usually employ and appreciate his help, Wally has a tendency to arrive uninvited, while neither he nor the C.L.A.D.E. agents are appreciative of his mother making unexpected calls at inopportune moments. Wally is less organized and more egotistical than Sam or Kit, but he is very competent in the thick of things, and his ability to reach higher elevations makes him a useful asset to the team. Like the Stinkwells, Wally only appears on an infrequent basis.
- Indie - a brown honeyguide bird and a recurring character in The Creature Cases.
- Junior Agent Cubby (voiced by Jules de Jongh) - a brown female dog who is top of her class at the academy. First named in the third-season finale, Cubby was first seen in the first season as an unnamed background character who appeared sporadically until her first named appearance.
- Barb (voiced by Jules de Jongh) - an orange bark scorpion who debuted in the third season. Sharp-tongued and sarcastic but fierce and loyal, Barb and Sam started off at odds before they bonded just as much as she did with Kit.

Other cast members include Marcel McCalla, Alex Woodhall, Joseph Balderrama, and Kerry Shale, all of whom voice background characters and other minor roles. Rackstraw, Gallagher, Jongh, and Carmichael also voice other characters outside of their main roles.

== Episodes ==
=== Series overview ===
Season	Segments	Episodes	Originally released
Chapter 1	23	12	April 12, 2022
Chapter 2	—N/a	1	November 30, 2022
Chapter 3	14	7	May 22, 2023
Chapter 4	—N/a	10	November 25, 2024
Chapter 5	—N/a	9	June 9, 2025
Chapter 6	—N/a	10	December 15, 2025
Chapter 7	—N/a	10	February 9, 2026

=== Chapter 1 (2022) ===
No. overall	No. in season	Title	Directed by	Written by	Original release date
1	1	"The Mystery on the Monsoon Express"	Jérémie Guneau & Sébastien Le Nevé	Gabe Pulliam	April 12, 2022
An average day in the Asian Jungle turns dangerous when a snake bites the driver of a train. Now, Sam and Kit have to find the culprit so that they can heal the driver enough to prevent a crash. Fact File(s): The Big Four; Note: The Russell's Viper is continually referred to as the Chain Snake in this episode.
2	2	"The Riddle of Raging Rhinos"	Jérémie Guneau	Gabe Pulliam	April 12, 2022
2	2	"The Trouble in the Tundra"	Sébastien Le Nevé	Shakira Pressley	April 12, 2022
Sam and Kit are sent to the African Grasslands to investigate rampaging rhinoceros at a watering hole gathering, and a bug-loving genet is caught in the act. When the Mice Squad go missing in the Arctic Tundra, Sam and Kit go on a long-winded search and discover that despite what it may seem, a nearby herd of musk oxen are likely involved. Fact File(s): Rhinoceros; Musk Oxen
3	3	"The Puzzle of the Plummeting Eggs"	Sébastien Le Nevé	Gabe Pulliam	April 12, 2022
3	3	"The Missing Mole Rat Princess"	Jérémie Guneau & Sébastien Le Nevé	Gabe Pulliam & Conner McCune	April 12, 2022
Sent to the European Wetlands to investigate falling bird eggs, Sam and Kit are given unexpected help from Wally Bungler as they race to stop a sneaky cuckoo bird. Sam and Kit are sent to the African Desert to locate a missing mole rat- the princess of the current kingdom. With time running short, however, the duo have to hurry before a hungry owl finds her first. Fact File(s): Cuckoo Bird; Naked Mole Rat
4	4	"The Hunt for the Hidden Hive"	Jérémie Guneau	Melinda LaRose	April 12, 2022
4	4	"The Trouble of the Toppled Trees"	Jérémie Guneau	Miden Wood	April 12, 2022
Sam and Kit are sent to the African Grasslands to help a lost honeybee find her hive and family, with Director Scratch assigning Indy, a nearby field agent, to assist in the search. Trees are falling over in a mysterious fashion in the North American Forest, and Sam and Kit have to find the culprit before the entire forest is destroyed. However, the burrowing suspect is hard to catch. Fact File(s): Honey Guides; Pocket Gophers
5	5	"The Mysterious Fruit Thief"	Jérémie Guneau	Christian Marsh Reiman	April 12, 2022
5	5	"The Riddle of the Wrestling Lizards"	Jérémie Guneau	Adam Felber	April 12, 2022
An orangutan is struck by a thief who has been stealing fruit from her island in the Asian Jungle, but even when Sam and Kit cover all their bases, the mystery bandit keeps slipping by their sights. Sam and Kit are dispatched to the North American Desert to try and break up a fight between a pair of gila monsters. However, they manage to bite and poison Kit, forcing Sam to work on the case by himself before the lizards leave the town in ruins. Fact File(s): Mouse Deer; Gila Monsters
6	6	"The Disappearing Dung Ball"	Sébastien Le Nevé	Gabe Pulliam	April 12, 2022
6	6	"The Search for the Spotted Frog"	Sébastien Le Nevé	Morgan von Ancken	April 12, 2022
Sam and Kit are sent to find a missing ball of giraffe dung on the African Grasslands. Sam, however, is less than enthused, particularly due to his germophobic nature. Wally Bungler joins Kit and Sam in the South American Jungle as they search for a tarantula's pet dotted humming frog. Unfortunately, the surrounding area is full of frogs, and finding the one they're looking for is a real challenge. Fact File(s): Dung beetles; Tarantulas
7	7	"The Case of the Big Chomp"	Jérémie Guneau	Charley Feldman	April 12, 2022
7	7	"The Secret of the Salt Cave"	Jérémie Guneau	Michael Rodriguez	April 12, 2022
The Mice Squad van's satellite dish is chomped off by a mysterious creature, and both Sam and Kit are at odds at who the culprit is. Sam and Kit are sent to the African Grasslands to help find a noisy animal keeping some bats awake, but the clues don't indicate an obvious culprit. Fact File(s): Alligators and Crocodiles; Elephants
8	8	"The Case of the Blue Bandit"	Sébastien Le Nevé	Nick Confalone	April 12, 2022
8	8	"The Honey Badger Break-In"	Jérémie Guneau	Ruth Morrison	April 12, 2022
Sam and Kit search the Australian Jungle for a large blue seashell for a land hermit crab, but as the search goes on, it becomes clear that the shell isn't the only lost object in the area. While set to return to HQ after a mission in the Africa Grasslands, Sam and Kit find R.O.N. has been taken over by a hive of bees, and the reason dawns upon them when a determined honey badger offers to help them. Fact File(s): Bowerbirds; Honey badgers
9	9	"The Unidentified Shiny Object"	Sébastien Le Nevé	Morgan von Ancken	April 12, 2022
9	9	"The Case of the Crying Monkey"	Sébastien Le Nevé	Nick Confalone	April 12, 2022
A mysterious object emitting several bright lights calls Wally Bungler to join Sam and Kit as they try to prevent it from ruining a firefly prom in the North American Forest. Sam and Kit uncover a mystery while training in the South American Jungle; a baby monkey cry not from the monkey it sounds like. Fact File(s): Fireflies; Margay
10	10	"The Search for the Silver Ant Hill"	Sébastien Le Nevé	Shakira Pressley	April 12, 2022
10	10	"The Search for the Swamp Snapper"	Sébastien Le Nevé	Shakira Pressley	April 12, 2022
Sam and Kit follow the clues to help a silver ant return to her nest in the African Desert; but the time they have before she overheats is running out fast. A mysterious creature is causing panic in the North American Wetlands, and Sam and Kit are sent to set things right. Fact File(s): Saharan Silver Ants; Snapping Turtles
11	11	"The Puzzle of the Poisonous Leaves"	Jérémie Guneau	Charley Feldman	April 12, 2022
11	11	"The Mystery of the Missing Hare"	Jérémie Guneau	Conner McCune	April 12, 2022
A case involving howler monkeys getting poisoned by the leaves they feed on leads Sam and Kit to team up with Philip Night, a nocturnal monkey who works as a private eye in the South American Jungle. Sam and Kit set out to return a lost snowshoe hare to a campsite in the North American Forest. However, a hungry wolf is set on devouring the hare. Fact File(s): Night Monkeys; Snowshoe Hares
12	12	"The Secret of the Sand Serpent"	Sébastien Le Nevé	Nick Confalone	April 12, 2022
12	12	"The Disappearance of Peggy Scratch"	Sébastien Le Nevé	Ruth Morrison	April 12, 2022
Sam and Kit are sent to the South American Desert to investigate a burrowing creature terrorizing a small town, but the locals are all too afraid to think sensibly. While on a training exercise, R.O.N. crashes on inaccessible island and Director Scratch vanishes not long afterwards, forcing Sam and Kit to put aside their current argument in order to save the head of CLADE. Fact File(s): Pink Fairy Armadillos; Inaccessible Island Rails

=== Chapter 2 (2022) ===
No. overall	No. in season	Title	Directed by	Written by	Original release date
13	1	"The Missing Mammoth: A Holiday Mystery"	Jérémie Guneau & Sébastien Le Nevé	Gabe Pulliam	November 30, 2022
After solving a reindeer mystery, Sam and Kit are about to head back to HQ for the holiday celebration, but accidentally travel back in time in the Ice Age. There, they must find the missing mammoth Grammy, who has disappeared while picking out moss for her family's celebration. The other C.L.A.D.E. agents, including a visiting Wally Bungler, set out to help their friends home, but with problematic results. Fact File(s): Woolly mammoths

=== Chapter 3 (2023) ===
No. overall	No. in season	Title	Directed by	Written by	Original release date
14	1	"The Forest Food Bandit"	Jérémie Guneau Sébastien Le Nevé	Ruth Morrison Veronica Pickett	May 22, 2023
14	1	"The Case of the Absent Giraffe"	Jérémie Guneau Sébastien Le Nevé	Ruth Morrison Veronica Pickett	May 22, 2023
A series of thefts in the North American forest is under investigation by Sam and Kit, but when similarities to her old case show up, Director Scratch joins them to tie up loose ends. Sam and Kit are on the hunt for a young giraffe in the African Grasslands, but he is proving to be a hard find. Fact File(s): Raccoon; Giraffe
15	2	"The Frozen Stowaways"	Jérémie Guneau Sébastien Le Nevé	Halcyon Person Veronica Pickett	May 22, 2023
15	2	"The Puzzle of the Empty Pond"	Jérémie Guneau Sébastien Le Nevé	Halcyon Person Veronica Pickett	May 22, 2023
The Stinkwells find three frozen creatures in R.O.N., and when they get loose in C.L.A.D.E. HQ, Sam and Kit have to find them and bring them home. When a pond in the North American wetlands doesn't fill up like usual, Sam and Kit are sent to investigate, but the creatures are increasingly rigid to all of their solutions. Fact File(s): Arctic woolly bear moth; Frosted flatwoods salamander
16	3	"The Undercover Hyena"	Sébastien Le Nevé Jérémie Guneau	Adam Idelson Melinda LaRose	May 22, 2023
16	3	"The Stranger in the Burrow"	Sébastien Le Nevé Jérémie Guneau	Adam Idelson Melinda LaRose	May 22, 2023
A mission to rescue Wally in the African desert requires Sam to disguise himself as a hyena, but the case quickly hits a roadblock. Sam and Kit are sent to the North American grasslands to investigate a mysterious creature in a shared gopher tortoise burrow, but the creature proves to be a hard catch. Fact File(s): Spotted hyena; Burrowing owl
17	4	"The Bat Cave Crisis"	Sébastien Le Nevé Jérémie Guneau	Gabe Pulliam Halcyon Person	May 22, 2023
17	4	"The Mysterious Ant Circle"	Sébastien Le Nevé Jérémie Guneau	Gabe Pulliam Halcyon Person	May 22, 2023
Wally is sent to the North American forest to find out why a number of bats are suddenly sneezing after waking up from their winter sleep, as every C.L.A.D.E. agent, including Sam and Kit, has tail-itis, an uncontrollable tail disease. After a family of capybaras is bitten at a birthday party, Sam and Kit are sent to the South American jungle to find the culprit. They turn out to be lost army ants, but leading them is proving to be problematic. Fact File(s): Bats; Army ants
18	5	"The Lost Capybara Kids"	Jérémie Guneau	Morgan von Ancken Ruth Morrison	May 22, 2023
18	5	"The Case of the Curious Keas"	Jérémie Guneau	Morgan von Ancken Ruth Morrison	May 22, 2023
Two capybaras can't be found after a game of hide-and-seek in the South American wetlands, forcing Sam and Kit to try and find them before an anaconda does, which their divided approaches could complicate. Sam and Kit are stranded in the Arctic tundra when a mysterious creature tampers with their snow cycles, but the culprit is soon found to have friends. Fact File(s): Anaconda; Kea
19	6	"The Legend of the Night Howler"	Jérémie Guneau Sébastien Le Nevé	Michael Rodriguez Miden Wood	May 22, 2023
19	6	"The Haystack Stakeout"	Jérémie Guneau Sébastien Le Nevé	Michael Rodriguez Miden Wood	May 22, 2023
Sam and Kit track a legendary creature who's spreading an unstoppable itch among prairie dogs in the North American desert, but even with the help of Barb, a local scorpion, the creature proves to be tricky to catch. A mass flower theft in the North American forest leads Sam, Kit, and the Mice Squad to investigate, but the local pikas won't do anything but blame each other. Fact File(s): Grasshopper mouse; Pikas
20	7	"The Case of the Scorpion's Sting"	Sébastien Le Nevé Jérémie Guneau	Melinda LaRose Connor McCune	May 22, 2023
20	7	"The Case of the Constant Dripping"	Sébastien Le Nevé Jérémie Guneau	Melinda LaRose Connor McCune	May 22, 2023
When a prairie dog gets stung in the North American desert, Kit is sent to help while Sam assists in filling out paperwork, but she also has the help of Barb the Scorpion. Sam and Kit, now Senior Agents, head to the North American wetlands with Junior Agent Cubby to solve the case of a mysterious sound, but when they find the culprit they soon find they have other matters to deal with. Fact File(s): Scorpion; American bittern

=== Chapter 4 (2024) ===
Unlike the first and third chapters' two-segmented episodic structure, Chapter 4 and all subsequent chapters afterward has the standard individual episodic structure.

No. overall	No. in season	Title	Directed by	Written by	Original release date
21	1	"The Spider's Stolen Silk"	Alban Rodriguez	Michael Rodriguez	November 25, 2024
Sam and Kit are sent to the North American jungle to hunt down a creature that for some reason is stealing spider webs from a Yellow garden spider. However, figuring out who did it is the easy part. Catching and stopping them is a whole other matter entirely. Fact File(s): Ruby-throated hummingbird
22	2	"The Mystery in the Snow Maze"	Alban Rodriguez	Roxana Altamirano	November 25, 2024
When an arctic fox kit goes missing in her mother's den in the European tundra, Sam and Kit find themselves exploring all sorts of twists and turns. Even the arrival of Wally Bungler struggles to turn up any definitive leads, and the case takes a turn for the drastic when they end up outside. Fact File(s): Arctic fox
23	3	"The Case of the Stinky Swamp"	Sébastien Le Nevé	Ruth Morrison	November 25, 2024
The Stinkwells end up in hot water while testing new inventions in the South American wetlands when a stinky smell fouls up the air for the locals. However, the Stinkwells are entirely innocent, but even with their help, the suspect proves to be a tricky find. Fact File(s): Skunk frog
24	4	"The Case of the Talking Tree"	Alban Rodriguez	Monique Simmon	November 25, 2024
A trio of wolves in the Asian forest get the scare of their lives when a tree howls loudly at them while they work on their new house. But no matter how deeply Sam and Kit look, they keep getting stumped at every single turn. Fact File(s): Tree cricket
25	5	"The Trail of the Tuatara"	Alban Rodriguez	Adam Idelson	November 25, 2024
Sam and Kit are placed into a creature case on the Oceanic coast where every single clue leads right to a tuatara who adamantly states that he is innocent. As it turns out, it was someone else entirely, though the tuatara ends up being key to saving the day. Fact File(s): Tuatara
26	6	"The Disaster at the Dust Spa"	Sébastien Le Nevé	Connor McCune	November 25, 2024
A mysterious trickle of water in the South American desert threatens the livlihoods of chinchillas making a living at a dust bath spa, forcing Sam and Kit to hustle before anyone gets a very unwanted soaking. Fact File(s): Chinchilla
27	7	"The Mysterious Swamp Rats"	Sébastien Le Nevé	Ruth Morrison	November 25, 2024
Sam and Kit are sent to investigate when a neighborhood in the North American wetlands comes under siege from invaders that residents are claiming to be swamp rats, but every single clue they find doesn't correlate with actual rat tracks. As it turns out, it was an entirely different situation that takes a LOT more urgency. Fact File(s): Opossum
28	8	"The Vanishing of Mr. Blue"	Alban Rodriguez	Michael J. Goldberg	November 25, 2024
Sam and Kit are deployed to the European forest find a bird who has gone missing. As the duo get more and more acquainted with the locals, however, they find that it's a well-meaning trick meant to ensure the have something worth keeping. Fact File(s): Flycatcher and Blue tit
29	9	"The Bat Who Couldn't Remember"	Sébastien Le Nevé	Adam Idelson; Astride Noel	November 25, 2024
The African jungle gets quite a big surprise when an orange bat crash lands right out of nowhere, and Sam and Kit find they have their work cut out for them - the mysterious bat has a massive case of amnesia. Fact File(s): Orange-furred bat Note: The Nimba myotis is continually referred to as the orange-furred bat in this episode.
30	10	"The Hidden Hitchhiker"	Sébastien Le Nevé	Gabe Pulliam	November 25, 2024
Sam and Kit find themselves in a sticky situation while heading back from a mission the South American jungle thanks to a stowaway they didn't account for. Now they have to unstick themselves before their flight home gets too dangerous... though their passenger doesn't make things remotely easy for them. Fact File(s): Velvet worm Note: The Onychophora is continually referred to as the Velvet Worm in this episode.

=== Chapter 5 (2025) ===
No. overall	No. in season	Title	Directed by	Written by	Original release date
31	1	"The Mystery of the Missing Milk"	Alban Rodriguez	Morgan von Ancken	June 9, 2025
Beach time on the North American coast hits an absolute wreck when a mysterious theif steals all the milk meant for the elephant seal pups, but Sam and Kit find it difficult to track down the theif when the adult seals keep making their job harder than it should be and all other suspects prove to be equally as fruitless. Fact File(s): Elephant seal
32	2	"The Puzzle of the Pink Kangaroo"	Sébastien Le Nevé	Morgan von Ancken	June 9, 2025
Sam and Kit reunite once more with their old friend Reggie the rhino when they are deployed to solve the case of an odd case of misplaced wildlife - a supposed kangaroo in the African grasslands, and bright pink, no less. Fact File(s): Springhare; Note: The Pedetes is continually referred to as the Springhare in this episode.
33	3	"The Vanished Valentine"	Sébastien Le Nevé	Gabe Pulliam	June 9, 2025
On valentine's day, a red panda in the Asian forest is distraught at her special someone having gone missing before she could confess to him, but even with Sam, Kit and Wally Bungler on the case, he's an elusive catch that they can't sem to find. Fact File(s): Red panda
34	4	"The Secret of the Cracked Cocoon"	Alban Rodriguez	Ruth Morrison	June 9, 2025
Sam and Kit are given an especially unusual case when the pair are deployed to the African desert - helping a FISH get back to the water before he dries out after a few elephants digging for salt accidentally wake him up far too early. Fact File(s): African lungfish
35	5	"The Riddle of the Rash"	Alban Rodriguez	Michael Rodriguez	June 9, 2025
The passengers on the Oceanic jungle's monsoon express is suddenly beset by an epidemic of a rapidly-spreading irritatingly itchy rash, and Sam and Kit find themselves a willing helper who ended up being not as innocent as he wants to think he is. Fact File(s): Hooded pitohui
36	6	"The Mystery on Yeti Mountain"	Sébastien Le Nevé	Roxana Altamirano	June 9, 2025
Sam and Kit are sent to investigate what could quite possibly be a mythical yeti in the Asian mountains after a series of raids on the local town farms. As Wally Bungler joins them on the case, they unravel the truth behind this fable. Fact File(s): Himalayan tahr
37	7	"The Case of the Mislaid Egg"	Sébastien Le Nevé	Michael J. Goldberg	June 9, 2025
An egg not from them is found by a dung beetle family on the Oceanic coast, and Sam and Kit are sent to find who laid it - which ends up being not what they expected. Fact File(s): Echidna
38	8	"The Sneaky Stick Stealer"	Alban Rodriguez	Connor McCune	June 9, 2025
Sam and Kit are deployed to the South American jungle to investigate the destruction of several birds' nests and the theft of the sticks needed to build them, this time assisted by old acquaintance private eye Philip Night and his young son... who ends up being just as much as a handful as he is a help. Fact File(s): Spectacled bear
39	9	"The Baffling Badger Affair"	Alban Rodriguez; Sébastien Le Nevé	Gabe Pulliam	June 9, 2025
On the invitation of Wally Bungler for his basement talk show, Sam and Kit recount the tale of the first case they were assigned to as partners... and the speedbumps they encounter on the rough start they faced to become the partners they are to this day. Fact File(s): Badger

=== Chapter 6 (2025) ===
No. overall	No. in season	Title	Directed by	Written by	Original release date
40	1	"The Beehive Burglar"	Alban Rodriguez	Ruth Morrison	December 15, 2025
Sam and Kit are deployed to the African grasslands to clear the name of Sweetie the honey badger after the bees blame him for a recent break-in - and the deeper they look, the more they find that no badger was involved in this raid. Fact File(s): Death's-head hawkmoth
41	2	"The Shadow of the Sky Pirates"	Sébastien Le Nevé	Melinda LaRose	December 15, 2025
Several raids upon seabird colonies in the Arctic coast prompts Sam and Kit to get creative with their methods - whether Wally Bungler wants to or not. Fact File(s): Arctic Skua; Note: The parasitic jaeger is continually referred to as the Arctic Skua in this episode.
42	3	"The Legend of Lemmingland"	Sébastien Le Nevé	Morgan von Ancken	December 15, 2025
Sam and Kit are deployed to the Arctic tundra after a barbaric tribe of lemmings besiege a town of hares. Now, the duo have to help them find their way to a winter home where they won't get into any trouble, which given their penchant for endless bickering, is not an easy process. Fact File(s): Norway Lemming
43	4	"The Riddle of the Lion's Roar"	Alban Rodriguez	Roxana Altamirano	December 15, 2025
A training exercise in the African grasslands ends with junior C.L.A.D.E. agent Cubby disappearing, with Sam and Kit finding themselves helping her assist Harry, a hornbill, save his mate before a lion gets to her. Fact File(s): Southern Ground Hornbill
44	5	"The Burrow of the Booty Bumper"	Sébastien Le Nevé	Connor McCune	December 15, 2025
Sam and Kit are sent to the Australian grasslands to help a family of dingoes figure out what chased them out of a borrow they were seeking to use as a new home. As they learned the hard way, even a creature's behind is a lot more dangerous than one would think. Fact File(s): Wombat
45	6	"The Missing Pack Member"	Alban Rodriguez	Michael Rodriguez	December 15, 2025
All available C.L.A.D.E. agents are deployed alongside Sam and Kit to the African grasslands to help an African wild dog navigate back to her pack after being separated by a raging wildfire. Fact File(s): African wild dog
46	7	"The Invisible Frog"	Sébastien Le Nevé	Gabe Pulliam	December 15, 2025
Sam and Kit accidentally bring back a devilishly hard to find frog back to C.L.A.D.E. HQ after returning from a mission, and the race is on to find the little fella before the Stinkwells' new cleaning robots accidentally take it out. Fact File(s): Glass frog
47	8	"The Island of the Lost Rabbits"	Alban Rodriguez	Alonso Cisneros	December 15, 2025
On a survival training exercise with no tech or gadgets on an island in the Asian jungle, Sam and Kit are handed a new creature case - helping a mama rabbit find her babies, which gets a lot more complicated when a hungry snake enters the picture. Fact File(s): Amami rabbit
48	9	"The Mystery of the Missing Acorns"	Sébastien Le Nevé	Michael J. Goldberg	December 15, 2025
Sam and Kit are sent to help a woodpecker in the North American forest find a bandit whose been stealing acorns from her granary tree, but the case becomes a lot more complicated when more and more suspects pile up over the course of the investigation. Fact File(s): Acorn Woodpecker
49	10	"The Thirsty Thief"	Alban Rodriguez	Melinda LaRose	December 15, 2025
A town in the North American desert is under a significant water crisis when the spigot for the communal water tank is mysteriously stolen. It's a race against time before the town overheats, but they can't seem to find the suspect they're looking for. Fact File(s): Mole lizard

=== Chapter 7 (2026) ===
No. overall	No. in season	Title	Directed by	Written by	Original release date
50	1	"The Case of the Lost Condors"	Alban Rodriguez	Morgan von Ancken	February 9, 2026
Sam and Kit are sent to the South American mountains to help find three fledgling young condors who have only just started learning to fly, a mission which gets to be more hazardous when the mountain they arrive at turns out to be a volcano. Fact File(s): Andean Condor
51	2	"The Danger in the Lion's Den"	Sébastien Le Nevé	Michael J. Goldberg	February 9, 2026
A leopard cub ends up giving Sam and Kit quite the challenging mission when they are sent to the African grasslands to save it - getting it out of a sleeping pride of lions before they wake up the dominant male. Good thing they have help from other C.L.A.D.E. agents. Fact File(s): Lion and leopard
52	3	"The Secret of the Stinky Fruit"	Alban Rodriguez	Roxana Altamirano	February 9, 2026
Sam and Kit are sent to the Asian jungle to help a troop of monkeys find their missing durian fruit, with Wally Bungler stepping in to lend a hand. But the big, stinky fruit might be a bit too much for either of them to handle. Fact File(s): Flying fox Note: The Pteropus is continually referred to as the Flying Fox in this episode.
53	4	"The Puzzle of the Panicking Penguins"	Sébastien Le Nevé	Kai Grayson; Connor McCune	February 9, 2026
A colony of penguins on the Oceanic coast is scared out of their minds by something that looks like a sea serpent, and they're too scared to go out and find food. Sam and Kit are sent to investigate, but there's only so much that a sea serpent can leave. Fact File(s): Little blue penguin
54	5	"The Hunt for the Hot Spring"	Sébastien Le Nevé	Kai Grayson	February 9, 2026
Sam and Kit are sent to the Asian tundra to help some Japanese macaques find a new hot spring after their usual one goes ice cold. Unfortunately, the macaques are from separate troops who don't get along, forcing the pair to keep the peace as they try to find a new hot spring. Fact File(s): Japanese Macaque
55	6	"The Creature in the Cave"	Sébastien Le Nevé	Ruth Morrison	February 9, 2026
A creature case in the Oceanic mountains gets turned entirely upside down when Sam and Kit are left unable to investigate due to being left trapped in a cave, forcing Bill and Jill to step up to the plate of searching for the bandit who swiped their music equipment. Fact File(s): Singing dog
56	7	"The CLADE Corn Caper"	Sébastien Le Nevé	Michael Rodriguez	February 9, 2026
Sam, Kit, and the rest of C.L.A.D.E. are undergoing their biggest mission yet - throwing director Scratch a grand surprise birthday party. Things quickly go into chaos when the birthday present goes missing, however, as if trying to keep director Scratch in the dark about the party wasn't hard enough. Fact File(s): Eastern Gray Squirrel
57	8	"The Search for the Enormous Snake"	Alban Rodriguez	Gabe Pulliam	February 9, 2026
A giant snake scares off everyone from a highly-anticipated movie screening event in the North American wetlands, but when Sam and Kit encounter an adventurous bobcat who readily volunteers to help find a burmese python, the skepticism from the locals puts them on edge on his trustworthiness. Fact File(s): Bobcat
58	9	"The Slimy Swamp Monster"	Alban Rodriguez	Ruth Morrison	February 9, 2026
Sam and Kit are sent to the South American jungle to investigate the sightings of a swamp monster that has all the locals scared out of their minds. As they correctly surmised, it's nothing spooky, but there does end up being another mystery they need to solve. Fact File(s): Sloth
59	10	"The Case of the Travelling Twigs"	Alban Rodriguez	Adam Idelson	February 9, 2026
A mice squad jam session in the North American grasslands gets interrupted by an oak tree dropping leaves, acorns, and branches, and things only get far more mysterious when Sam and Kit are called over to investigate... and find a few visitors far from home. Fact File(s): Walking stick Note: The Phasmatodea is continually referred to as the Walking Stick in this episode.

== Production ==
The series was first announced in September 2021 as part of four Netflix Original Preschool shows targeted at 2–6 year olds.

== Release ==
The Creature Cases was globally released on April 12, 2022, on Netflix. A trailer was released on March 29, 2022.

Starting in July 2024, the series aired on Nickelodeon, while still maintaining its Netflix slot.

== Reception ==
The series received a 5/5 rating on Common Sense Media where Diondra Brown praised it for being both educational and entertaining, especially for those that love learning about animals. Writing for Parents, Elisabeth Sherman described it as "a near-perfect balance between cute animal-based entertainment and education," and commended its ancillary focus on teaching basic geography alongside creature facts. Collider writer Brian Massoto called the show "Netflix's answer to Detective Pikachu" and praised the way it incorporates real-world animal facts into its storytelling.

In 2024, the show was nominated in the "Best TV/Media - Preschool" category at the 51st Annie Awards.
