= Blanus alexandri =

Scientific classification
- Kingdom: Animalia
- Phylum: Chordata
- Class: Reptilia
- Order: Squamata
- Clade: Amphisbaenia
- Family: Blanidae
- Genus: Blanus
- Species: B. alexandri

Binomial name
- Blanus alexandri Sindaco, Kornilios, Sacchi & Lymberakis, 2014

Species of amphisbaenian

Blanus alexandri, called Alexander's worm-lizard, is an amphisbaenian species in the family Blanidae. It is endemic in Adana, Hatay, Gaziantep, and Şırnak provinces of Turkey. It was formerly considered a subspecies of Blanus strauchi. It is named in honour of A. Allan Alexander, who studied the species.
