= Blanus tingitanus =

Conservation status
- Least Concern (IUCN 3.1)

Scientific classification
- Kingdom: Animalia
- Phylum: Chordata
- Class: Reptilia
- Order: Squamata
- Clade: Amphisbaenia
- Family: Blanidae
- Genus: Blanus
- Species: B. tingitanus

Binomial name
- Blanus tingitanus Busack, 1988
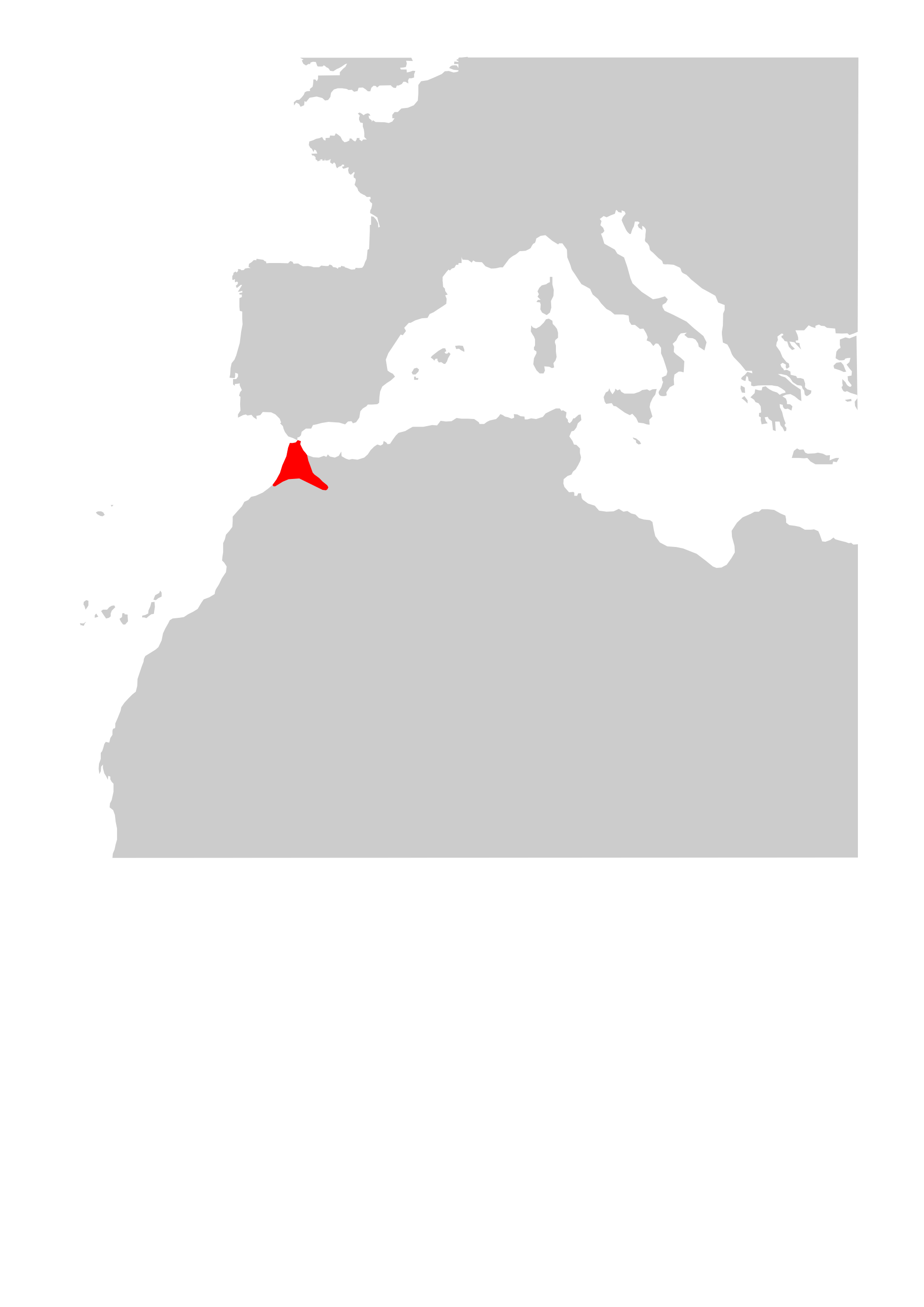

Species of amphisbaenian

Blanus tingitanus is a species of amphisbaenian in the family Blanidae.

== Geographic range ==
B. tingitanus is found in northern Morocco including Ceuta (a Spanish autonomous city).

== Taxonomy and systematics ==
B. tingitanus was formerly considered a part of Blanus cinereus, which (as currently defined) is restricted to Portugal and Spain.

== Habitat ==
The natural habitats of B. tingitanus are temperate forests, Mediterranean-type shrubby vegetation, arable land, and pastureland.

== Conservation stats ==
B. tingitanus is threatened by habitat loss.
