= Three-toed worm lizard =

Conservation status
- Least Concern (IUCN 3.1)

Scientific classification
- Kingdom: Animalia
- Phylum: Chordata
- Class: Reptilia
- Order: Squamata
- Clade: Amphisbaenia
- Family: Bipedidae
- Genus: Bipes
- Species: B. tridactylus

Binomial name
- Bipes tridactylus (Dugès, 1894)

Species of lizard

The three-toed worm lizard (Bipes tridactylus) is a worm lizard species in the family Bipedidae. It is endemic to Mexico. It inhabits a small coastal lowland area of Guerrero state close to the Tecpan River.
