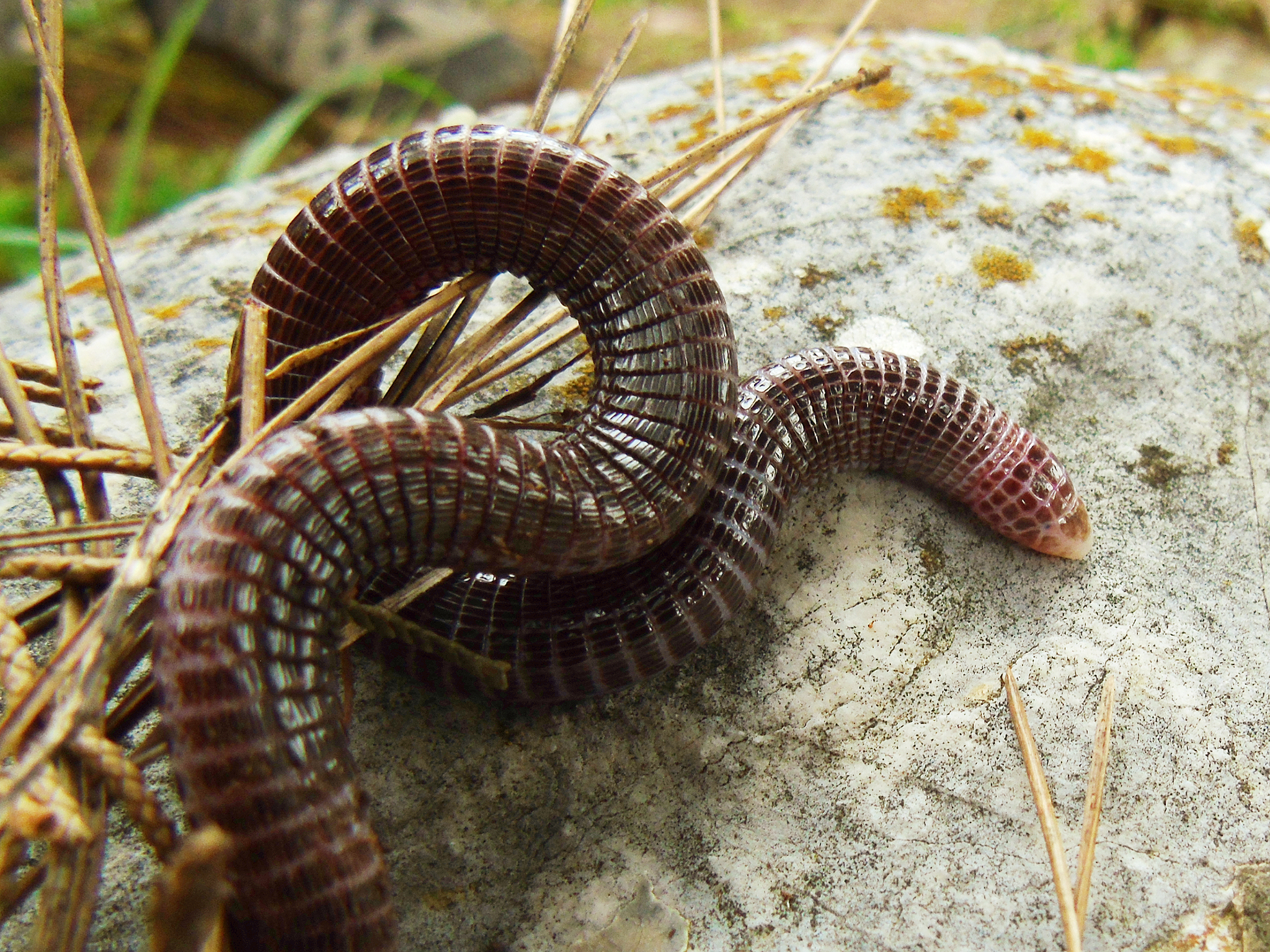

Conservation status
- Least Concern (IUCN 3.1)

Scientific classification
- Kingdom: Animalia
- Phylum: Chordata
- Class: Reptilia
- Order: Squamata
- Clade: Amphisbaenia
- Family: Blanidae
- Genus: Blanus
- Species: B. aporus

Binomial name
- Blanus aporus F. Werner, 1898

Synonyms
- Blanus strauchi aporus F. Werner, 1898

= Blanus aporus =

Species of amphisbaenian

Blanus aporus is an amphisbaenian species in the family Blanidae. The species is native to Syria, and western Turkey (from Pamphylia and Cilicia in southern Anatolia). It was regarded by recent authors as a subspecies of Blanus strauchi.

== Habitat ==
The preferred natural habitat of Blanus aporus is shrubland, at elevations of 19–1,068 m (62–3,504 ft).

== Behavior ==
Blanus aporus is terrestrial and fossorial, burrowing in soft sandy soils that have a high level of humus.

== Reproduction ==
Blanus aporus is oviparous. Clutch size is one or two eggs.
