= Blanus mariae =

Scientific classification
- Kingdom: Animalia
- Phylum: Chordata
- Class: Reptilia
- Order: Squamata
- Clade: Amphisbaenia
- Family: Blanidae
- Genus: Blanus
- Species: B. mariae

Binomial name
- Blanus mariae Albert & Fernández, 2009

Species of amphisbaenian

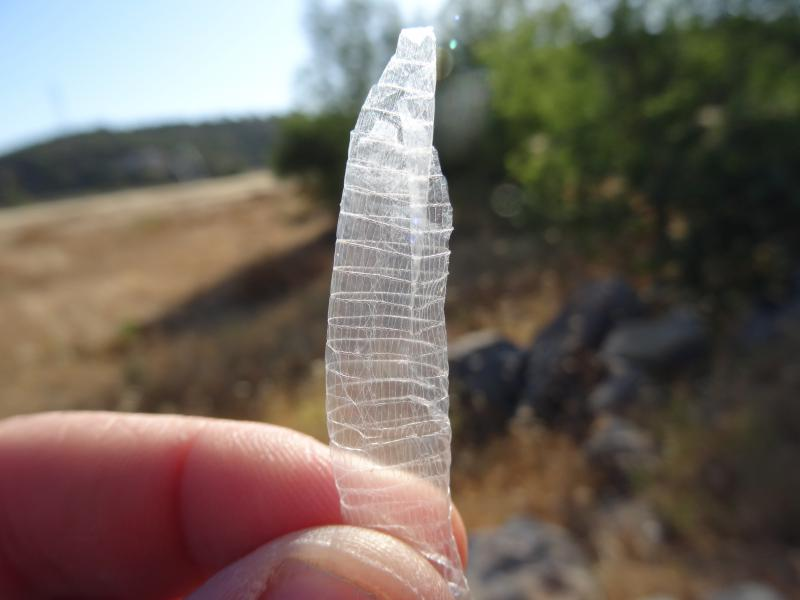
Blanus mariae moulting skin in Tavira, Portugal

Maria's worm lizard (Blanus mariae) is an amphisbaenian species in the family Blanidae. The species is endemic to the Iberian Peninsula.

== Geographic range ==
Blanus mariae is found in the southwestern Iberian Peninsula, mainly in the southern half of Portugal and in the spanish autonomous communities of Extremadura and western Andalusia.

== Taxonomy ==
Blanus mariae forms a cryptic species complex with Blanus cinereus.

== Etymology ==
The specific name, mariae, is in honour of Maria del Rosario Aguilar Tortajada (1914–2002), the grandmother of Eva María Albert, one of the scientists who described this species.

== Description ==
Blanus mariae has an average snout–vent length of 175 mm (6.9 in). The body colour is pale pink to dark brilliant purple, with a reticulate pattern caused by the inter-segmental sutures.
