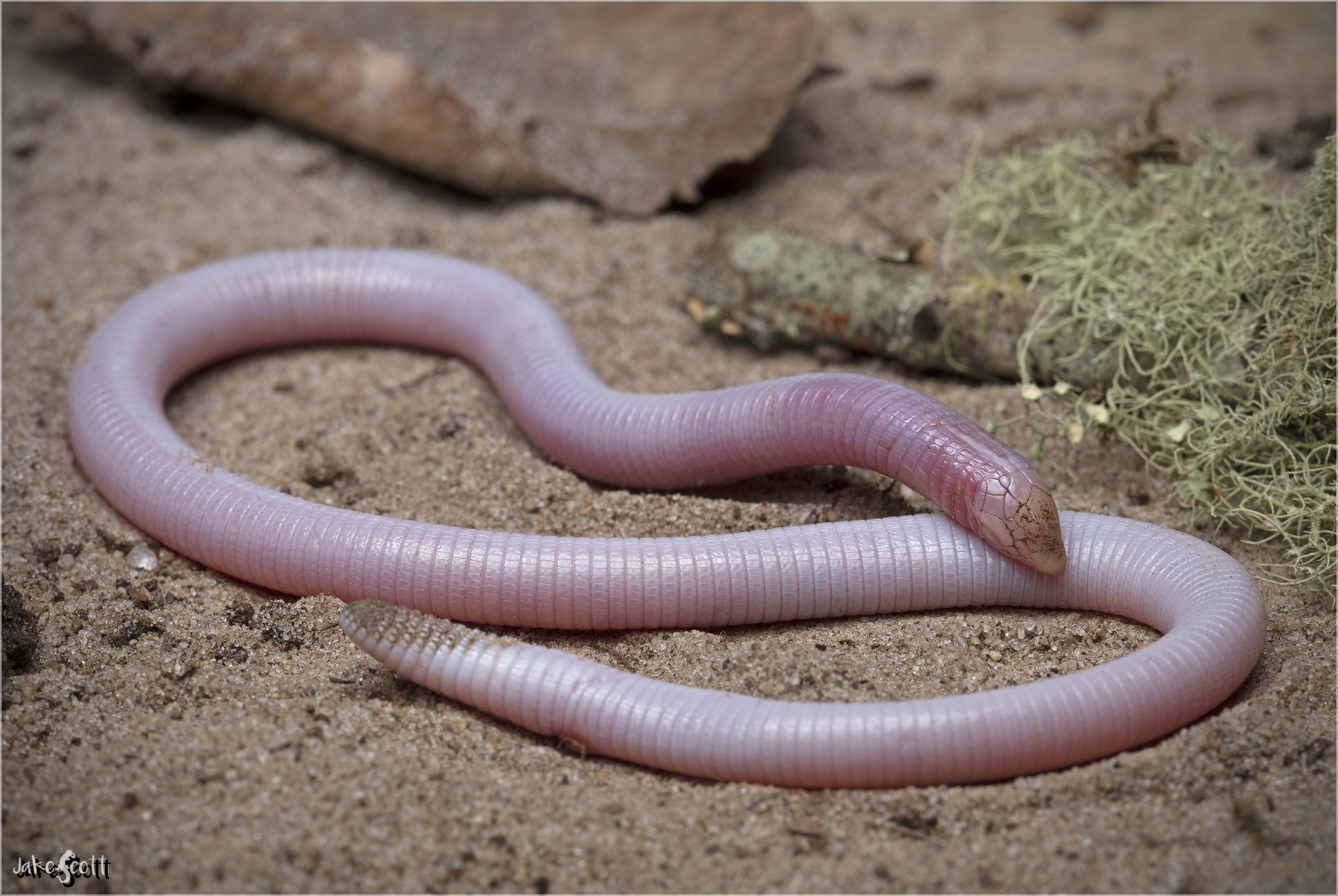
- Florida worm lizard (Rhineura floridana)

Scientific classification
- Kingdom: Animalia
- Phylum: Chordata
- Class: Reptilia
- Order: Squamata
- Suborder: Lacertoidea
- Clade: Amphisbaenia
- Family: Rhineuridae
- Genus: Rhineura; Cope, 1861

Species
- Rhineura floridana; †Rhineura marslandensis; †Rhineura sepultura

= Rhineura =

Rhineura Temporal range: Miocene – Recent

Genus of reptile

Rhineura is a genus of worm lizard endemic to North America. The genus has only one extant species but more are known from fossil record. They are also known as the North American worm lizards.

== History ==
This genus has a fossil record dating back to at least the Early Miocene, although if Protorhineura hatcherii is classified as belonging to Rhineura (as it has in the past), the record extends back well into the Oligocene.

While the extant Florida worm lizard is largely restricted to northern Florida, the genus was far more widespread in the past, with the extinct R. marslandensis and R. sepultura known from the Miocene of Nebraska and South Dakota, respectively.
