= Moroccan worm lizard =

Moroccan Worm Lizard

Conservation status
- Least Concern (IUCN 3.1)

Scientific classification
- Kingdom: Animalia
- Phylum: Chordata
- Class: Reptilia
- Order: Squamata
- Clade: Amphisbaenia
- Family: Blanidae
- Genus: Blanus
- Species: B. mettetali

Binomial name
- Blanus mettetali Bons, 1963
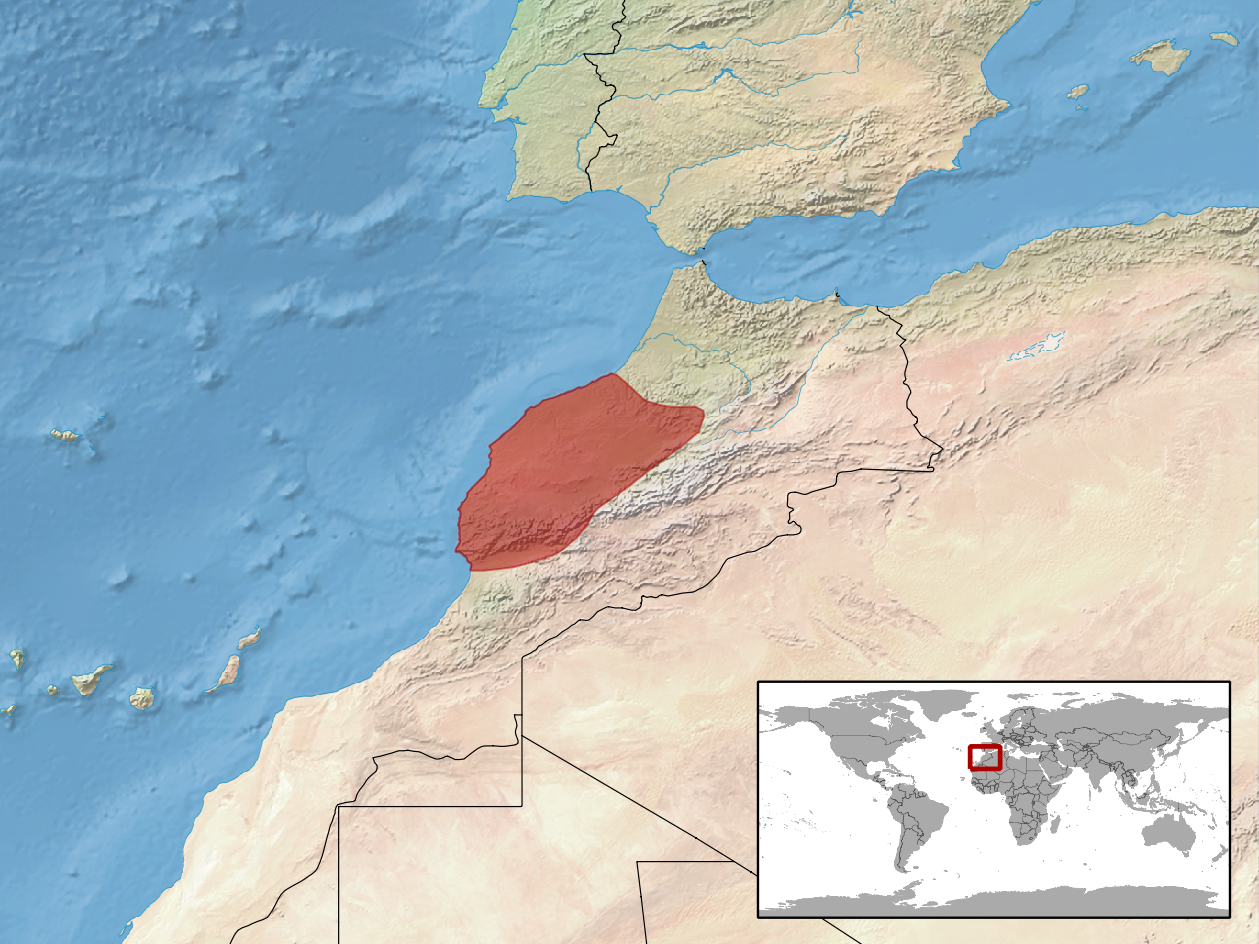

Synonyms
- Blanus cinereus mettetali Bons, 1963; Blanus mettetali — Busack, 1988

Species of amphisbaenian

The Moroccan worm lizard (Blanus mettetali) is a species of amphisbaenian in the family Blanidae. The species is endemic to Morocco.

== Etymology ==
The specific name, mettetali, is in honor of a Mr. Mettetal who was head of the Laboratory of Animal Biology, Faculty of Sciences of Morocco.

== Description ==
Blanus mettetali has eight or more preanal pores, which are usually arranged in a continuous transverse series.

== Habitat ==
The natural habitats of Blanus mettetali are temperate forests, temperate shrubland, Mediterranean-type shrubby vegetation, arable land, and pastureland, at elevations up to 2,092 m (6,864 ft).

== Behavior ==
Blanus mettetali is terrestrial, sheltering in sandy soil and under stones.

== Reproduction ==
Blanus mettetali is oviparous. Clutch size is one egg.

== Conservation status ==
Blanus mettetali is threatened by habitat loss.
