= Wind River Formation =

Geologic formation in Wyoming, United States

- Stratigraphic range: Paleogene
- Type: Geological formation

Location
- Region: Wyoming
- Country: United States

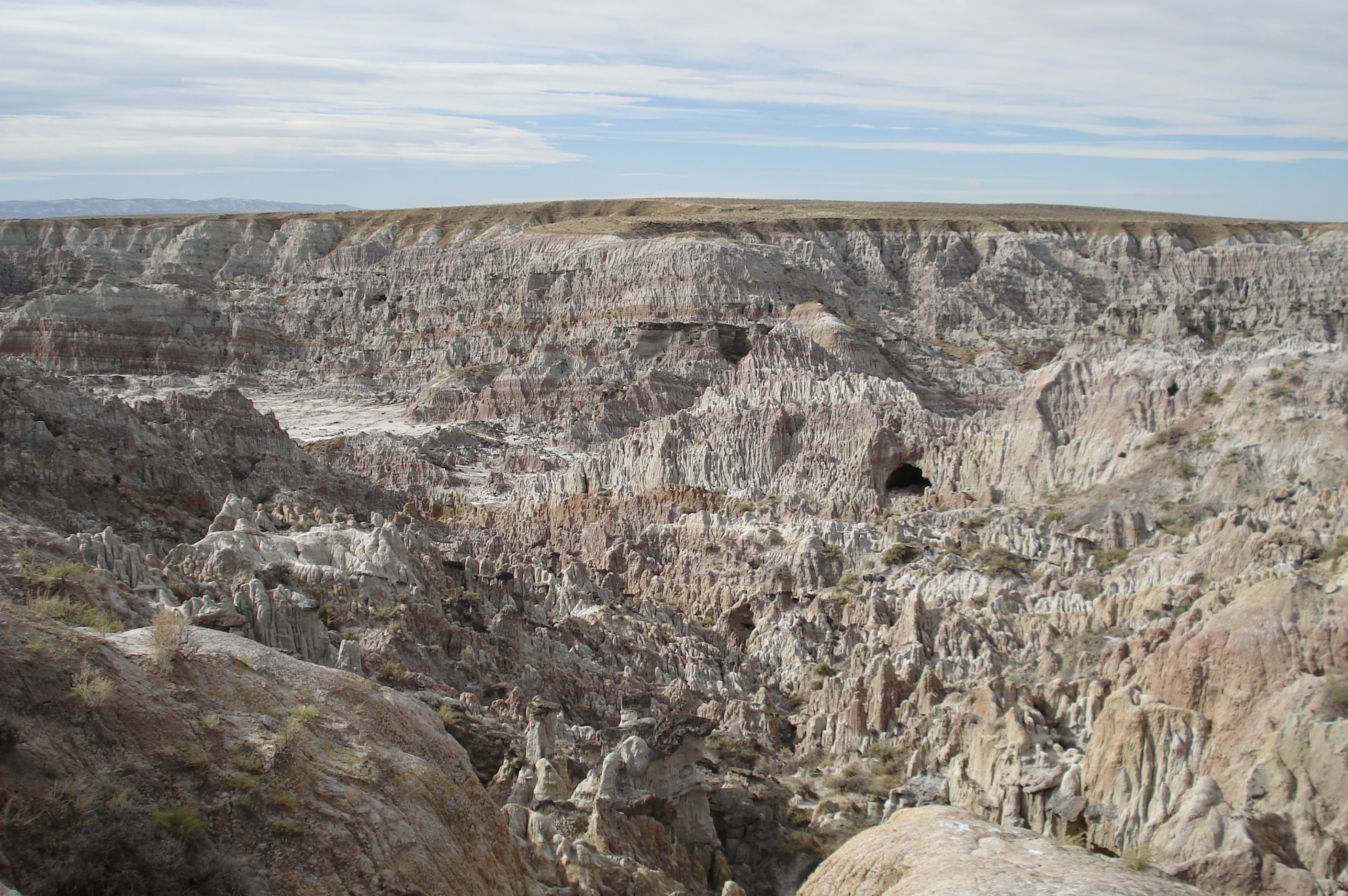
Wind River Formation at Hell's Half Acre, Natrona County, Wyoming.

The Wind River Formation is a geologic formation in Wyoming in the Wind River Basin. It preserves fossils dating back to the Paleogene period. A recent study by Stanford suggests that fracking has contaminated the entire ground water resource in the basin.

== Fossil content ==
=== Mammals ===
==== Apatotheres ====
Apatotheres reported from the Wind River Formation
Genus	Species	Presence	Material	Notes	Images
Apatemys	A. bellulus	Lost Cabin Member.		Also found in the Willwood Formation.	

==== Cimolestans ====
Cimolestans reported from the Wind River Formation
Genus	Species	Presence	Material	Notes	Images
Palaeosinopa	P. incerta	Lost Cabin Member.		A pantolestid also known from the Willwood and San Jose formations .	
Palaeosinopa	P. sp.	Lost Cabin Member.		A pantolestid.	

==== Leptictids ====
Leptictids reported from the Wind River Formation
Genus	Species	Presence	Material	Notes	Images
Palaeictops	P. bicuspis	Lost Cabin Member.		Also known from the Willwood Formation.	

==== Primatomorphs ====
Primatomorphs reported from the Wind River Formation
Genus	Species	Presence	Material	Notes	Images
Absarokius	A. sp.	Cottonwood Creek, Lysite Member.		An omomyid.	
Arapajovius	A. cf. gazini				
Copelemur	C. feretutus	Lysite Member.	"ACM 4326, an isolated right M1".	A notharctine.	

==== Rodents ====
Rodents reported from the Wind River Formation
Genus	Species	Presence	Material	Notes	Images
Paramys	P. sp.	Lost Cabin Member.	"ACM 327, a right mandible with M1 through M3 and partial P4".		

==== Ungulates ====
Ungulates reported from the Wind River Formation
Genus	Species	Presence	Material	Notes	Images
Diacodexis	D. secans		AMNH 4899 (left and right P4-M3).	A dichobunid.	

=== Reptiles ===
==== Squamates ====
Squamates reported from the Wind River Formation
Genus	Species	Presence	Material	Notes	Images
Ototriton	O. solidus	Lysite Member.	ACM 3539.	A worm lizard.	
Protorhineura	P. hatcherii			A worm lizard also known from the Brule & White River formations.	
Spathorhynchus	S. fossorium			A worm lizard also known from the Bridger Formation.	

=== Invertebrates ===
==== Insects ====
Insects reported from the Wind River Formation
Genus	Species	Presence	Material	Notes	Images
Phyllocnistis		Near Dubois, Wyoming.	Mine on a leaflet impression of Cedrela.		

=== Plants ===
Plants reported from the Wind River Formation
Genus	Species	Presence	Material	Notes	Images
Cedrela		Near Dubois, Wyoming.	Leaflet impression.		

== See also ==
- List of fossiliferous stratigraphic units in Wyoming
- Paleontology in Wyoming
