= Hyporhina =

Hyporhina Temporal range: Late Eocene − Middle Oligocene, 40–30 Ma

Scientific classification
- Domain: Eukaryota
- Kingdom: Animalia
- Phylum: Chordata
- Class: Reptilia
- Order: Squamata
- Clade: Amphisbaenia
- Family: Rhineuridae
- Genus: †Hyporhina; Baur, 1893

Species
- †H. antiqua Baur, 1893 (type); †H. galbreathi Taylor, 1951

Extinct genus of lizards

Hyporhina is an extinct genus of amphisbaenians or worm lizards that lived from the Late Eocene to the Middle Oligocene (approximately 40 to 30 million years ago) in what is now the western United States.

== Species ==
It currently includes two species, both from the White River Formation in eastern Wyoming and northeastern Colorado:

- Hyporhina antiqua — the type species.
- Hyporhina galbreathi
- Hyporhina tertia — a third species named in 1972, and later synonymized with Hyporhina galbreathi.

== Taxonomy ==
Paleontologist Georg Baur named the genus Hyporhina in 1893, making it one of the first prehistoric amphisbaenians to be described. Baur placed it in its own family, Hyporhinidae, because it possessed eye sockets that are enclosed at the back by postorbital bars, a feature that living amphisbaenians lack.

However, more recent studies have placed it within Rhineuridae, a family that includes the living Rhineura floridana from Florida, and many more extinct species from the western United States that were named after 1893 and have postorbital bars. Hyporhina differs from other rhineurids in having a steep angle to its snout.

== See also ==
- White River Formation prehistoric fauna
