= Spathorhynchus =

Spathorhynchus Temporal range: Middle Eocene - Early Oligocene, 40–30 Ma

Scientific classification
- Domain: Eukaryota
- Kingdom: Animalia
- Phylum: Chordata
- Class: Reptilia
- Order: Squamata
- Clade: Amphisbaenia
- Family: Rhineuridae
- Genus: †Spathorhynchus; Berman, 1973

Species
- †S. fossorium Berman, 1973 (type); †S. natronicus Berman, 1977

Extinct genus of lizards

Spathorhynchus is an extinct genus of amphisbaenians or worm lizards that existed from the Middle Eocene to the Early Oligocene in what is now Wyoming. It includes two species, the type species S. fossorium, named in 1973 from the Middle Eocene Bridger and Wind River Formations, and the species S. natronicus, named in 1977 from the Lower Oligocene White River Formation. Spathorhynchus belongs to the family Rhineuridae, which includes many other extinct species that ranged across North America at various times in the Cenozoic but only has one surviving member, Rhineura floridana, from Florida. Spathorhynchus differs from all other rhineurids except Dyticonastis from the Late Oligocene-Early Miocene of Oregon in having a slightly widened, spatula-shaped snout tip with a low angle of about 30 degrees. The two taxa may be closely related, having evolved in isolation in western North America after the formation of the Rocky Mountains separated them from rhineurids further east.
