= Ototriton =

Ototriton Temporal range: Early Eocene

Scientific classification
- Domain: Eukaryota
- Kingdom: Animalia
- Phylum: Chordata
- Class: Reptilia
- Order: Squamata
- Clade: Amphisbaenia
- Family: Rhineuridae
- Genus: †Ototriton; Loomis, 1919

Type species
- †Ototriton solidus Loomis, 1919

Extinct genus of lizards

Ototriton is an extinct genus of rhineurid amphisbaenian or worm lizard from the Early Eocene of the western United States, including the type and only species Ototriton solidus. Paleontologist F. B. Loomis named Ototriton in 1919 on the basis of a single skull from the Wind River Formation in Wyoming, misinterpreting it as the skull of a salamander. Unlike salamanders and like other rhineurids, Ototriton has a shovel-shaped snout that it presumably used for burrowing underground. Ototriton is one of the earliest known rhineurids and also one of the largest.

Several other species have been assigned to Ototriton since Loomis named the genus in 1919. In 1928, paleontologist Charles W. Gilmore assigned a vertebra from the Bridger Formation of Wyoming, first classified as Glyptosaurus anceps, to Ototriton based on its large size, but later attributed it to the snake Lestophis crassus. In 1945, Gilmore and G. I. Jepsen named a new species of Ototriton, O. minor, on the basis of another skull from the Wind River Formation, distinguishing it from O. solidus on the basis of its smaller size. O. minor was later classified as its own genus, Jepsibaena. The most recent study to consider the specimen places it in the species Protorhineura hatcherii.
