= Dyticonastis =

Dyticonastis Temporal range: Late Oligocene - Early Miocene

Scientific classification
- Domain: Eukaryota
- Kingdom: Animalia
- Phylum: Chordata
- Class: Reptilia
- Order: Squamata
- Clade: Amphisbaenia
- Family: Rhineuridae
- Genus: †Dyticonastis; Berman, 1976

Type species
- †Dyticonastis rensbergeri Berman, 1976

Genus of reptiles

Dyticonastis is an extinct genus of amphisbaenians, or worm lizards, that includes a single species, Dyticonastis rensbergeri, that lived during the late Oligocene and early Miocene in what is now Oregon. Fossils of the species come from the John Day Formation. It belongs to Rhineuridae, a family that includes many other extinct North American amphisbaenians but only one living species, Rhineura floridana, from Florida. Dyticonastis rensbergeri occurs the farthest west of all rhineurid species. Like all rhineurids, Dyticonastis has a shovel-like snout adapted for burrowing underground, but it differs from most other members of the group in having a relatively shallow angle to its snout wedge (about 30 degrees) and in having a widened snout tip. The only other rhineurids that share these features are species of the genus Spathorhynchus, which lived from the Middle Eocene to the Early Oligocene in what is now Wyoming. A 2007, phylogenetic analysis of amphisbaenians found that Dyticonastis and Spathorhynchus are each other's closest relatives, suggesting that both taxa may have evolved through vicariant speciation; the growth of the Rocky Mountains during the earliest stages of the Laramide orogeny in the early Paleogene would have separated North American rhineurids into eastern and western populations, with the western population producing Dyticonastis and Spathorhynchus.
