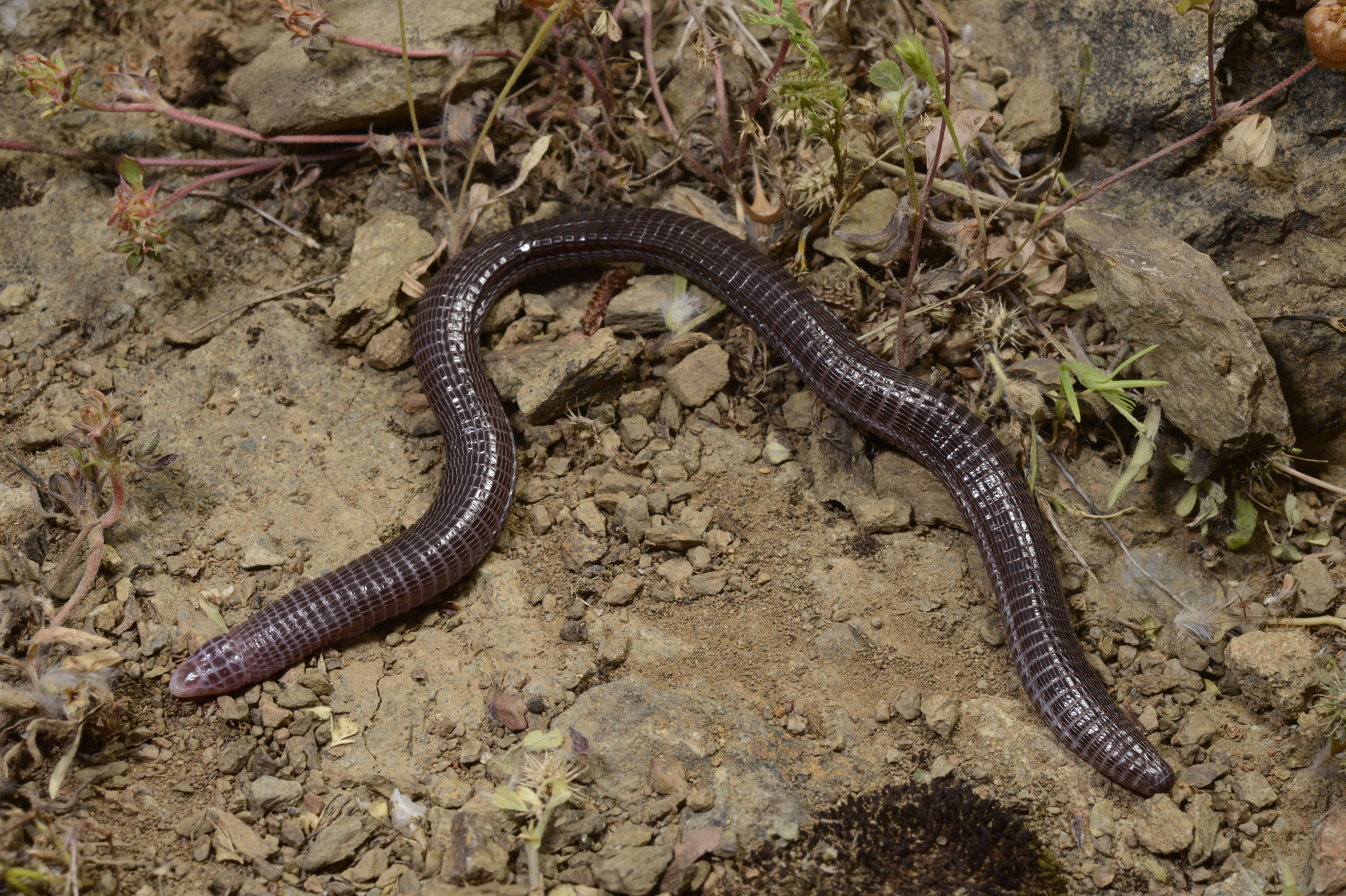

Conservation status
- Least Concern (IUCN 3.1)

Scientific classification
- Kingdom: Animalia
- Phylum: Chordata
- Class: Reptilia
- Order: Squamata
- Clade: Amphisbaenia
- Family: Blanidae
- Genus: Blanus
- Species: B. strauchi

Binomial name
- Blanus strauchi (Bedriaga, 1884)

Synonyms
- Amphisbaena strauchi Bedriaga, 1884; Blanus strauchi — Engelmann et al., 1993

= Turkish worm lizard =

Species of amphisbaenian

The Turkish worm lizard (Blanus strauchi) is a species of amphisbaenian in the family Blanidae. The species is native to Southeast Europe and the Middle East. There are two recognized subspecies.

== Etymology ==
The specific name, strauchi, is in honor of Russian herpetologist Alexander Strauch.

== Geographic range ==
B. strauchi is found in Greece, Iraq, Syria, and Turkey.

== Habitat ==
The preferred natural habitat of B. strauchi is shrubland, at altitudes from sea level to 1,400 m (4,600 ft).

== Reproduction ==
B. strauchi is oviparous.

== Subspecies ==
Two subspecies are recognized as being valid, including the nominotypical subspecies.

- Blanus strauchi bedriagae Boulenger, 1884
- Blanus strauchi strauchi (Bedriaga, 1884)

Nota bene: A trinomial authority in parentheses indicates that the subspecies was originally described in a genus other than Blanus.
