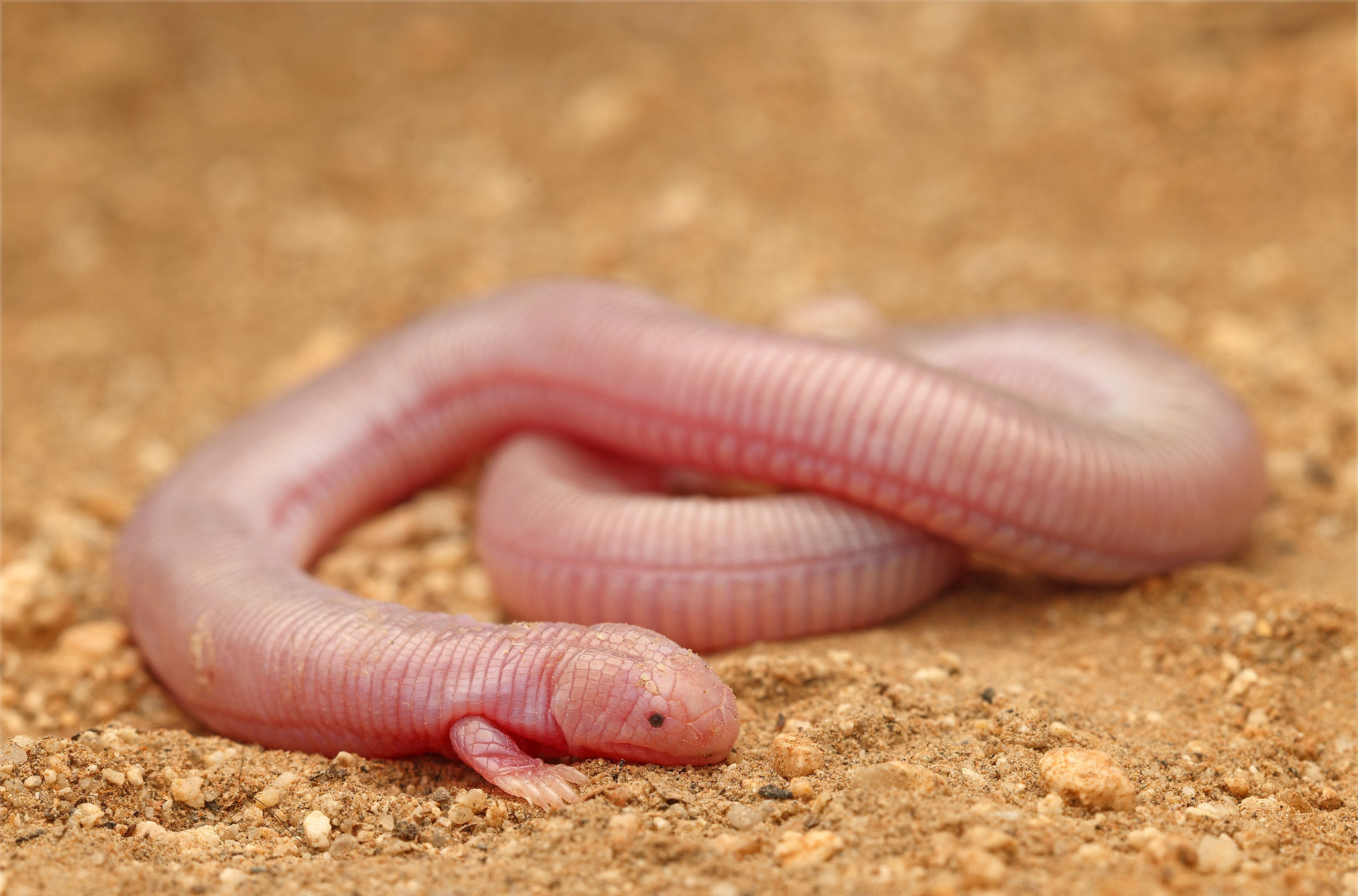

Conservation status
- Least Concern (IUCN 3.1)

Scientific classification
- Kingdom: Animalia
- Phylum: Chordata
- Class: Reptilia
- Order: Squamata
- Clade: Amphisbaenia
- Family: Bipedidae
- Genus: Bipes
- Species: B. biporus

Binomial name
- Bipes biporus (Cope, 1894)

Synonyms
- Euchirotes biporus Cope, 1894; Euchirotes diporus [sic] Cope, 1896 (ex errore); Bipes biporus — Stebbins, 1985

= Mexican mole lizard =

Species of lizard

The Mexican mole lizard (Bipes biporus), also commonly known as the five-toed worm lizard, or simply as Bipes, is a species of amphisbaenian in the family Bipedidae. The species is endemic to the Baja California Peninsula. It is one of three species of amphisbaenians that have legs.

== Genetic variation ==
Studies demonstrate that Mexican mole lizards have very low genetic variation among the three allopatric species found in the genus Bipes. All three allopatric species have seven fixed identical loci and only six different fixed loci. This is due to the similar environments that all three species are found in.

== Description ==
B. biporus is pink and worm-like, 18–24 cm (7.1–9.4 in) in snout-to-vent length (SVL) and 6–7 mm (0.24–0.28 in) in width. It lives for one to two years. Its skin is closely segmented to give a corrugated appearance, and like earthworms, its underground movement is by peristalsis of the segments. Its blunt head allows it to burrow into sandy soils efficiently. The forelegs are short, strong and paddle-like, while the hind legs are absent, only having vestigial bones. The tail is autotomous without any regeneration. Due to sacrificing the development of its ear to permit it to dig more efficiently, the Mexican mole lizard has evolved to have its skin transmit vibrations to the cochlea.

== Reproduction ==
B. biporus is oviparous, and the females lay one to four eggs in midsummer. The species only breeds underground. The eggs hatch after two months. The juveniles tend to be pink and then turn white as they grow. B. biporus does not exhibit sexual dimorphism, with their gender only being determined by looking at their gonads.

== Geographic range ==
The Mexican mole lizard (B. biporus) is found in the states of Baja California, Baja California Sur, Guerrero and Chiapas, in Mexico. These species tend to be found on this peninsula near the sandy soils in desert with dry shrub land. They spend their time burrowed from 2.5 cm to 15 cm.

== Behavior ==
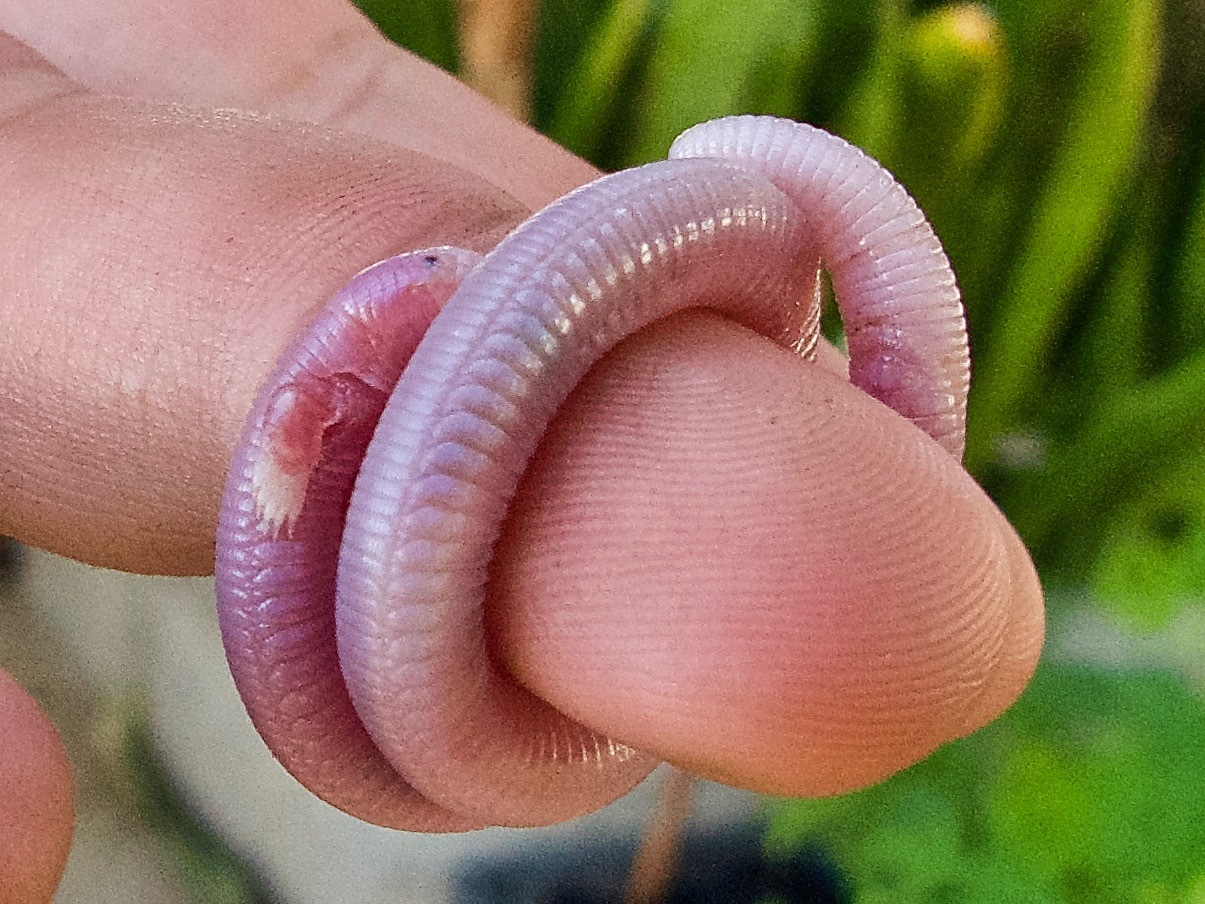
Coiled around a finger, in Mexico

Like all other amphisbaenians, B. biporus is a burrowing species that only surfaces at night or after heavy rain. It uses its autotomous tail as an escape tactic for predators. Losing a part of the tail while burrowing can plug up the hole behind it, giving it time to escape.

== Diet ==
B. biporus is an opportunist carnivore and eats ants, termites, ground-dwelling insects, larvae, earthworms, and small vertebrates including lizards. It usually pulls its prey underground to start its meal. The species is a generalist predator that feeds on easily accessible prey found in soil, debris, and dirt. Stomach content analyses showed that most prey items were soft-bodied and bore tooth marks, indicating that the lizard bit and chewed them rather than swallowing them whole. Prey items are generally smaller in diameter than the gape of the individual B. biporus that consumed them.

== Predators ==
Human activity poses a significant threat to this species, alongside its natural predators, as is common among many species. Urban development and agricultural practices often result in habitat destruction, particularly concerning as these creatures typically burrow at shallow depths. Among their natural predators, snakes pose a notable threat, particularly if they are larger in size and share the same habitat.
