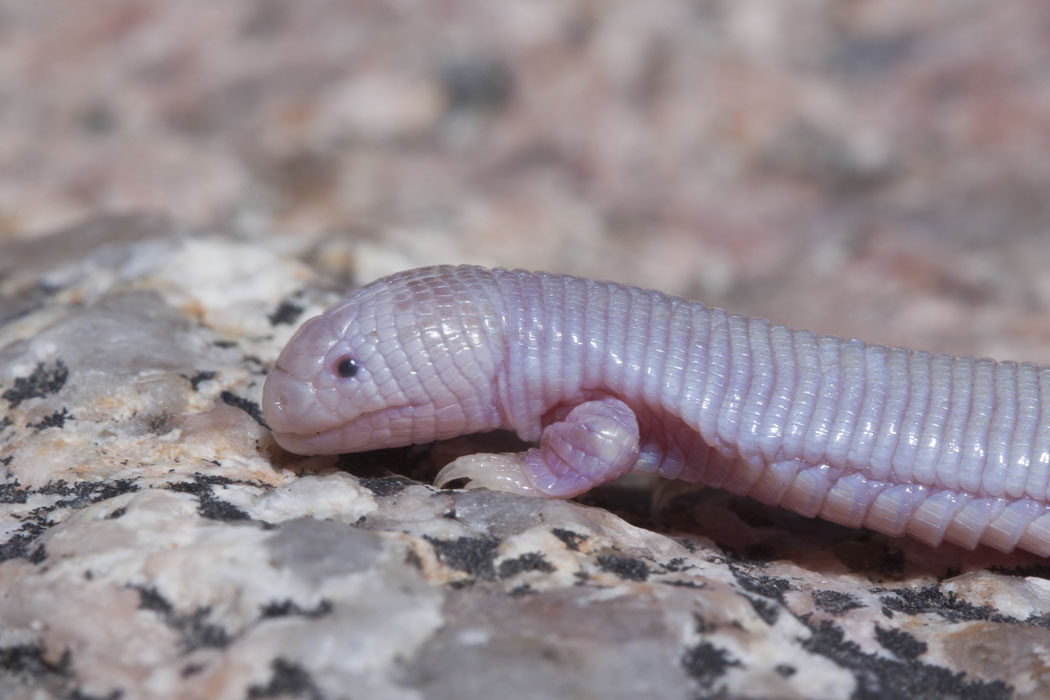
- Mexican mole lizard (Bipes biporus)

Scientific classification
- Kingdom: Animalia
- Phylum: Chordata
- Class: Reptilia
- Order: Squamata
- Clade: Amphisbaenia
- Family: Bipedidae; Taylor, 1951

Genera
- †Anniealexandria; Bipes

= Bipedidae =

Bipedidae Temporal range: Early Eocene – Present, 55–0 Ma

Family of amphisbaenians

Bipedidae is a family of amphisbaenians that includes the extant genus Bipes represented by three species from Baja California and the southern coast of Mexico and the extinct genus Anniealexandria represented by one species that lived in what is now Wyoming during the earliest Eocene around 55 million years ago. Phylogenetic analysis indicates that Bipedidae is most closely related to the family Blanidae, which includes the living genus Blanus.

Bipedidae are very small, usually ranging from 120 to 240 mm (4.7 to 9.4 in). They lack external hind limbs and are the only amphisbaenians with well-developed fossorial front limbs, which each include five claws. They have a short tail that does not regenerate if lost. They use their blunt head for burrowing by ramming it into the soil, and usually prey on arthropods.
