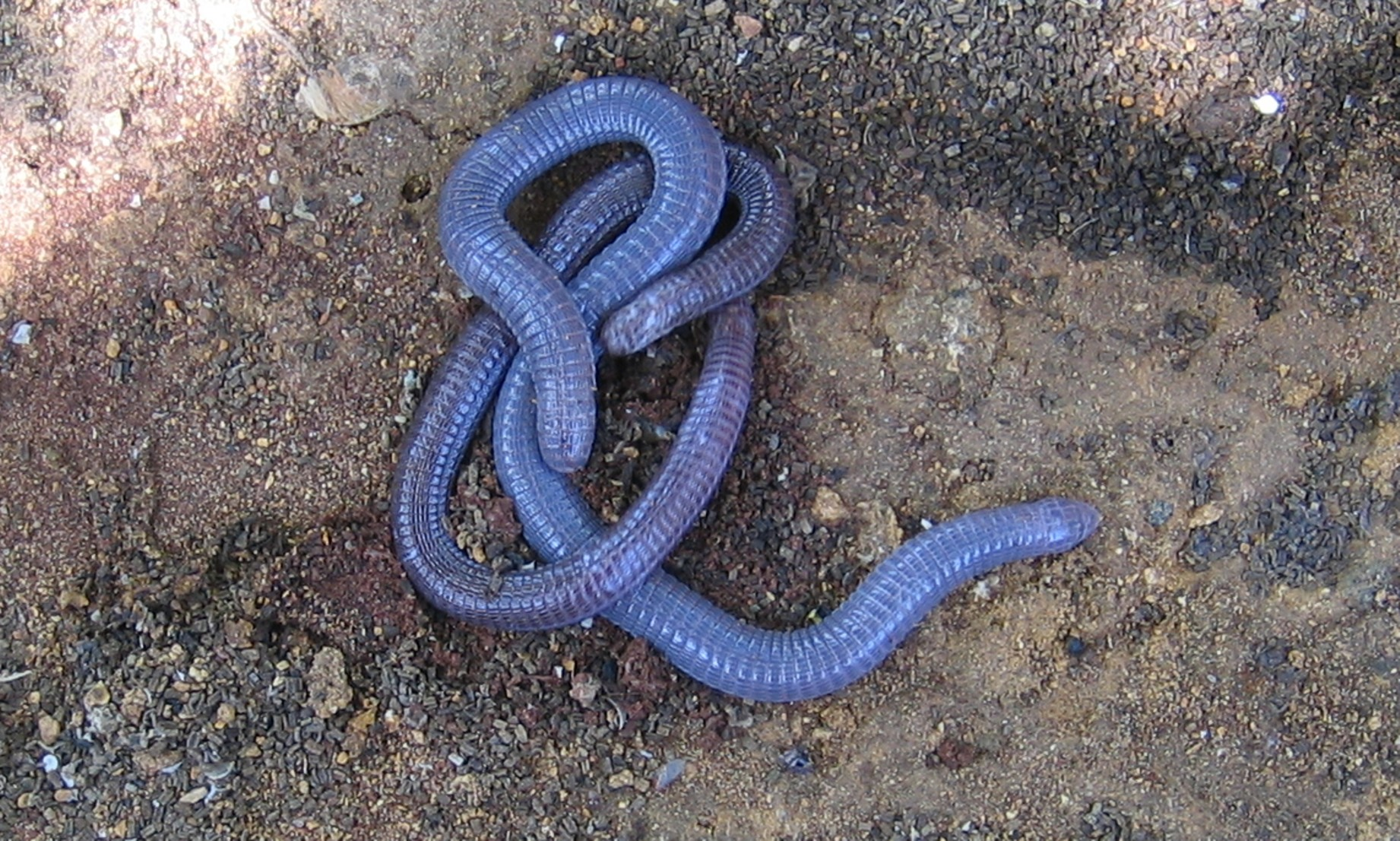
- Two Iberian worm lizards

Conservation status
- Least Concern (IUCN 3.1)

Scientific classification
- Kingdom: Animalia
- Phylum: Chordata
- Class: Reptilia
- Order: Squamata
- Clade: Amphisbaenia
- Family: Blanidae
- Genus: Blanus
- Species: B. cinereus

Binomial name
- Blanus cinereus (Vandelli, 1797)
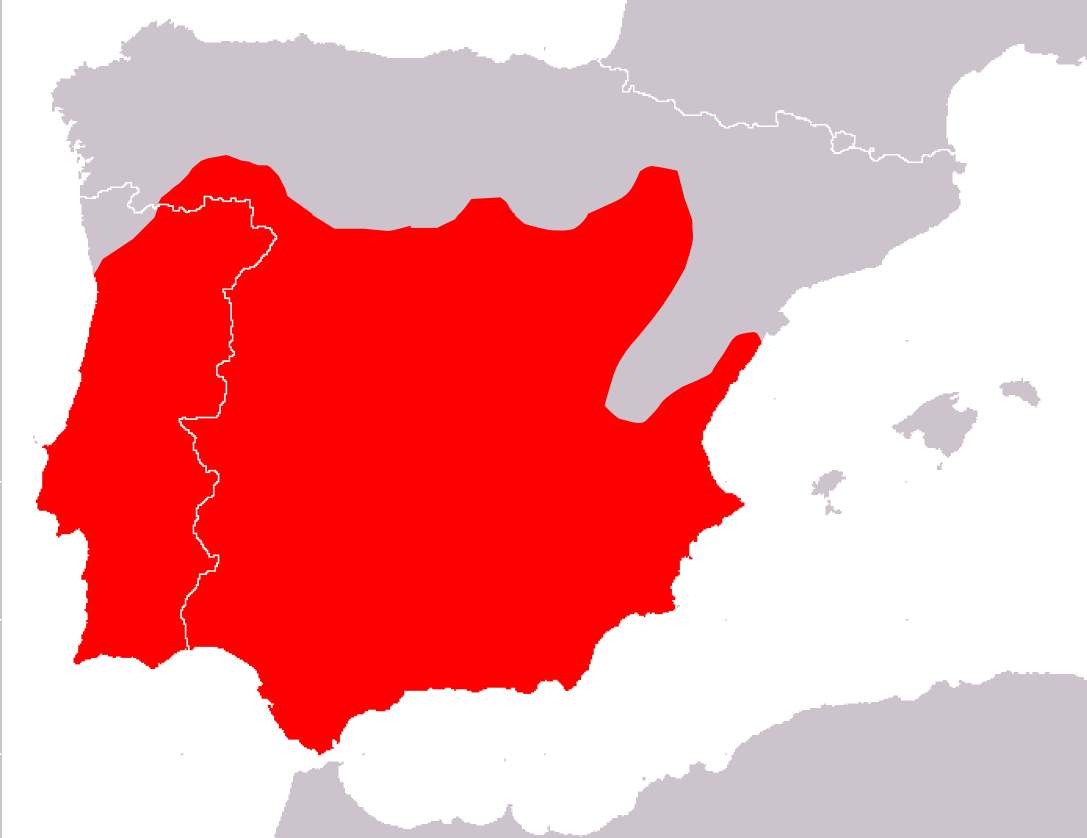

Synonyms
- Amphisbæna cinerea Vandelli, 1797; Blanus cinereus — Wagler, 1865; Blanus mariae Albert & Fernández, 2009

= Iberian worm lizard =

Species of amphisbaenian

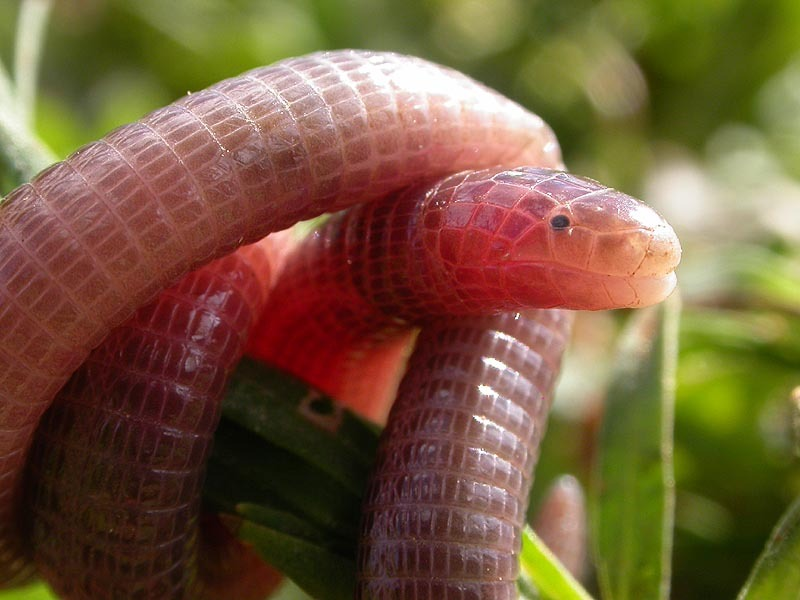
An Iberian worm lizard

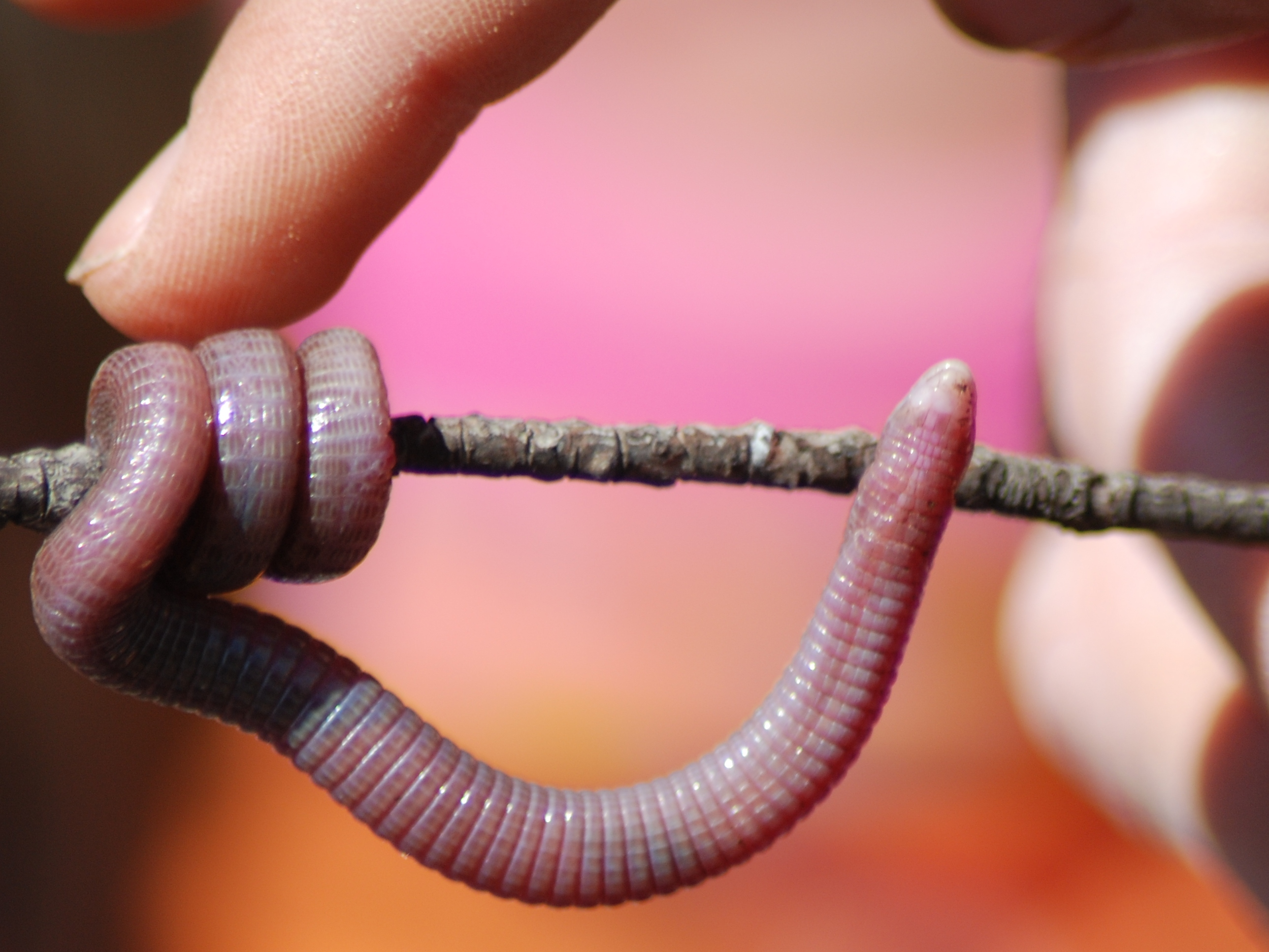
B. cinereus with a human finger for scale

The Iberian worm lizard, Mediterranean worm lizard, or European worm lizard (Blanus cinereus) is a species of reptile in the family Blanidae (worm lizards) of the clade Amphisbaenia. The Iberian worm lizard is locally known as cobra-cega (Portuguese), culebrilla ciega (Spanish), and colobreta cega (Catalan), all meaning "blind snake". Recent studies into the mitochondrial and nuclear genomic data of 47 isolated B. cinereus populations show rather large sequence divergence between two apparent clades, leading some researchers to call for a division of the Iberian worm lizard into two species. While little is known of B. cinereus in comparison with some other reptile species, new insight is growing about this primitive, ancestral reptile.

== Geographic range ==
The Iberian worm lizard is found within Portugal and through most of central and southern Spain.

== Habitat ==
B. cinereus is a subterranean species found in a wide variety of Mediterranean habitats. Their abundance in population in different regions is difficult to determine due to their subterranean nature. However, studies on B. cinereus activity have shown the organism's ability to survive in habitats between 400 meters and 1400 meters. The Iberian worm lizard is a thermoregulator meaning it can only survive in habitats conducive to its thermoregulatory needs. Typical habitats for B. cinereus consist of areas of high humus and sporadic rocks of varying thickness. B. cinereus will take advantage of their habitat's loose soil depth and rocks as means for thermoregulation. Depending on the time of day Iberian worm lizards will move in between 0 cm and 10 cm of soil and underneath rocks varying in thickness from 10 cm to 20 cm. B. cinereus will use the depth of soil, particularly the deeper soil, to cool down and the rocks to warm itself to varying degrees based on the time of day and thickness of the rocks. By using its habitat, the Iberian worm lizard is able to maintain a constant body temperature with minimal energy expense.

== Diet ==
The Iberian worm lizard is believed to be an opportunistic feeder through the study of central Spanish B. cinereus populations. Initially, B. cinereus was thought to feed on the diverse array of prey that inhabited the underside of rocks, but a correlation with feeding habits and under rock prey was not seen. Its diet consisting mainly of insects and insect larvae, which are the worm lizard's most abundant food source, led observers to make the conclusion that B. cinereus acts as an opportunistic feeder. While being an overall opportunistic feeder, B. cinereus will instinctively hunt for larger insect larvae and will refrain from eating certain ant species, thus showing a level of prey distinguishing during opportunistic feeding. B. cinereus is also believed to have low energy requirements based on average stomach content in comparison with other lizard species. It is speculated that Iberian worm lizards will search for scarce but energy-rich foods when habitats allow for this type of feeding, but can adapt and feed on abundant and less energy-rich prey when necessary.

== Morphology ==
The Iberian worm lizard has similar morphology to a worm because of its limbless ringed body, but unlike worms it possesses small, underdeveloped eyes, small smooth scales, and most importantly it has all characteristics of a typical vertebrate like, vertebral column, lungs, and closed circulatory system. The head is small and blunt, used for digging, with underdeveloped eyes covered by skin, and a characteristically ridged ringed body covered in scales. Iberian worm lizard tails are short and possess the same scales. It has a small forked tongue used for chemosensory signaling purposes, and a row of small but sharp teeth within the mouth's interior. Its coloration is fleshy-pink, violet, or brown depending on its region. Adults are usually about 150 mm (5.9 in) in total length, but can be up to 300 mm (12 in) in total length. Iberian worm lizards are frequently mistaken for small snakes or large worms.

== Chemosensory signaling ==
Due to its subterranean lifestyle, the Iberian worm lizard exhibits characteristically small, primitive eyes. These eyes leave the B. cinereus with almost a complete inability to see, only distinguishing changes in light intensity. However, B. cinereus has made up for its lack of sight through the development of a chemosensory signaling systems. Chemosensory signaling is mediated by the extremely sensitive vomeronasal organ on the head of the B. cinereus. The response to individual chemical stimuli can be measured by counting tongue flicks.

=== Prey signaling ===
Cotton swabs exhibiting prey specific chemical indicators elicit tongue flick responses by the B. cinereus. However, there is no difference in this response between prey and non-prey signals. In contrast, tests with live prey instead of cotton swabs have shown that B. cinereus can clearly discriminate between live prey and live non-prey based on the chemicals given off by the individuals. A consistent and direct correlation has been seen in testing between higher average of tongue flicks in the presence of live prey than in the presence of non-live prey. The distinction between cotton swab and live prey testing suggests the ability of B. cinereus to distinguish live prey and non-prey chemical signals.

=== Predator signaling ===
Cotton swab studies emitting predatory chemosensory signals have also been performed in order to quantify the Iberian worm lizard's anti-predatory response mechanisms. Swabs exhibiting signals from predators like the southern smooth snake, Coronella girondica, the scolopendromorph centipede (Scolopendra), and the Bedriaga's skink, Chalcides bedriagai were all tested. Again, the amount and rate of tongue flicks was used to quantify the anti-predatory response, as well as any defensive acts taken upon the swab. High rates of tongue flicks were seen for all three predator chemicals with defensive biting by B. cinereus subjects on the swabs smelling like snake or centipede. While a conclusive statement cannot be made about the hierarchy of predators based on tongue flicks, the self-defense response would indicate the skink as being the greatest threat to B. cinereus.

=== Habitat signaling ===
Evidence has also been seen for a chemosensory signaling response between the Iberian worm lizard and its environment. This phenomenon has been seen in the time it takes for the anti-predatory response of burrowing into the soil in familiar and unfamiliar locations. A delay is seen in the burrowing of B. cinereus upon predatory signaling in an unfamiliar location, but as soon as the B. cinereus is returned to its familiar habitat its burrowing response is greatly increased. Precloacal secretions from males and females include long chain waxy-type esters of carboxylic acids that are thought to be secreted along tunnels to help multiple Iberian worm lizards find their way.

=== Sex differentiation signaling ===
Chemosensory signaling is especially important in sex-distinction between Iberian worm lizards. The pheromones released from the precloacal glands of the male and female are sex specific in composition. The secretions from these precloacal glands have been isolated and its contents identified for both male and female. The compound squalene is secreted in high concentrations from males, while tocopherol is specific for female secretions. The role of squalene in male secretions has been proved to be enough for a male recognition, while tocopherol is only suspected to be based on its high concentrations in female excretions and not males.

== Phylogeny ==
Very little is known about the origins of amphisbaenians, and even less for the Iberian worm lizard. Phylogenetic analysis of two nuclear genes from the tissue of a modern amphisbaena specimen and that from museum fossil samples has shed some light on the origins of amphisbaena. The data would suggest a widespread convergence of limb loss as well as skull morphology from Rhineuridae and Bipedidae lineages. DNA analysis would suggest that there were three separate incidences of limb loss all convergent for amphisbaena formation. This evidence, as well as a look into mitochondrial and genomic DNA of B. cinereus has led some experts to believe there ought to be two distinct taxonomic clades within B. cinereus located on the Iberian Peninsula. While morphological characteristics are less defined between the two proposed clades, the genetic variation is incontrovertible and significant enough to make gene flow unlikely. Experts attribute these divergent potential clades, and their potential to continue to differentiate, to constraints of subterranean life. The clades are distinguished based on their locations with B. cinereus being located centrally on the peninsula and the second proposed clade Blanus mariae located on the southwestern side of the Iberian peninsula.
