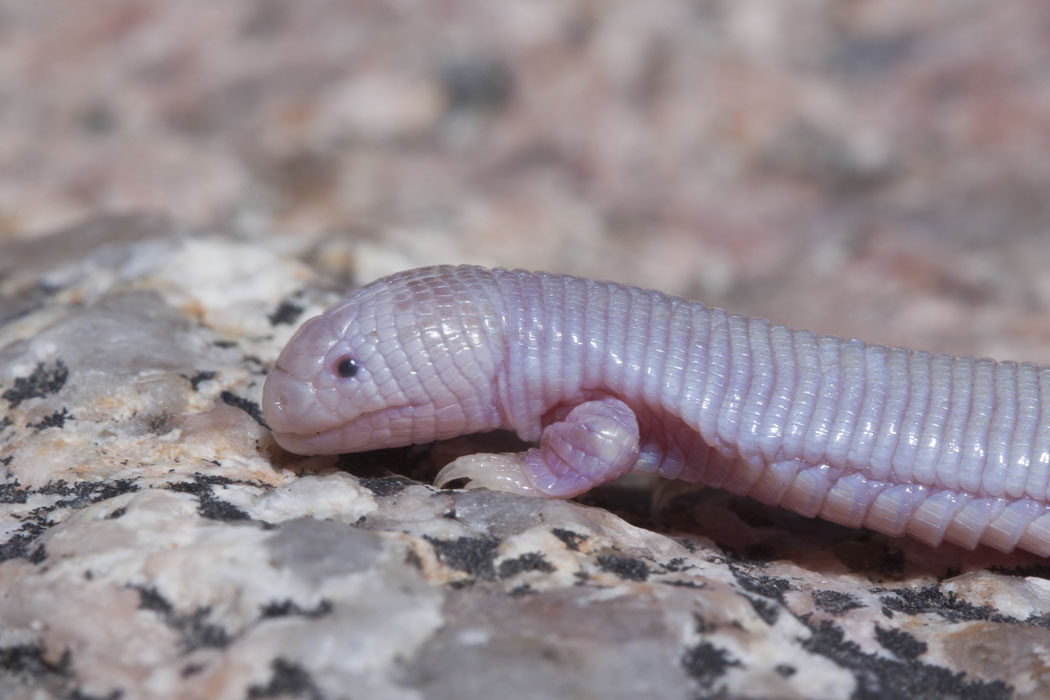
- Mexican mole lizard (Bipes biporus)

Scientific classification
- Kingdom: Animalia
- Phylum: Chordata
- Class: Reptilia
- Order: Squamata
- Clade: Amphisbaenia
- Family: Bipedidae
- Genus: Bipes; Latreille, 1801

Species
- Bipes biporus (Cope, 1894); Bipes canaliculatus Latreille, 1801; Bipes tridactylus (Dugès, 1894)

= Bipes (lizard) =

Genus of lizards

Bipes is a genus of amphisbaenians (or worm lizards) found only in Mexico, the sole living member of the family Bipedidae. They are carnivorous, burrowing reptiles, but unlike other species of amphisbaenians, they possess two stubby forelimbs placed far forward on the body. They also retain an almost complete pectoral girdle. The shovel-like limbs are used to scrape away soil while burrowing, in a manner similar to a mole. Evidence for their occurrence in the United States is reviewed by Somma (1993).
