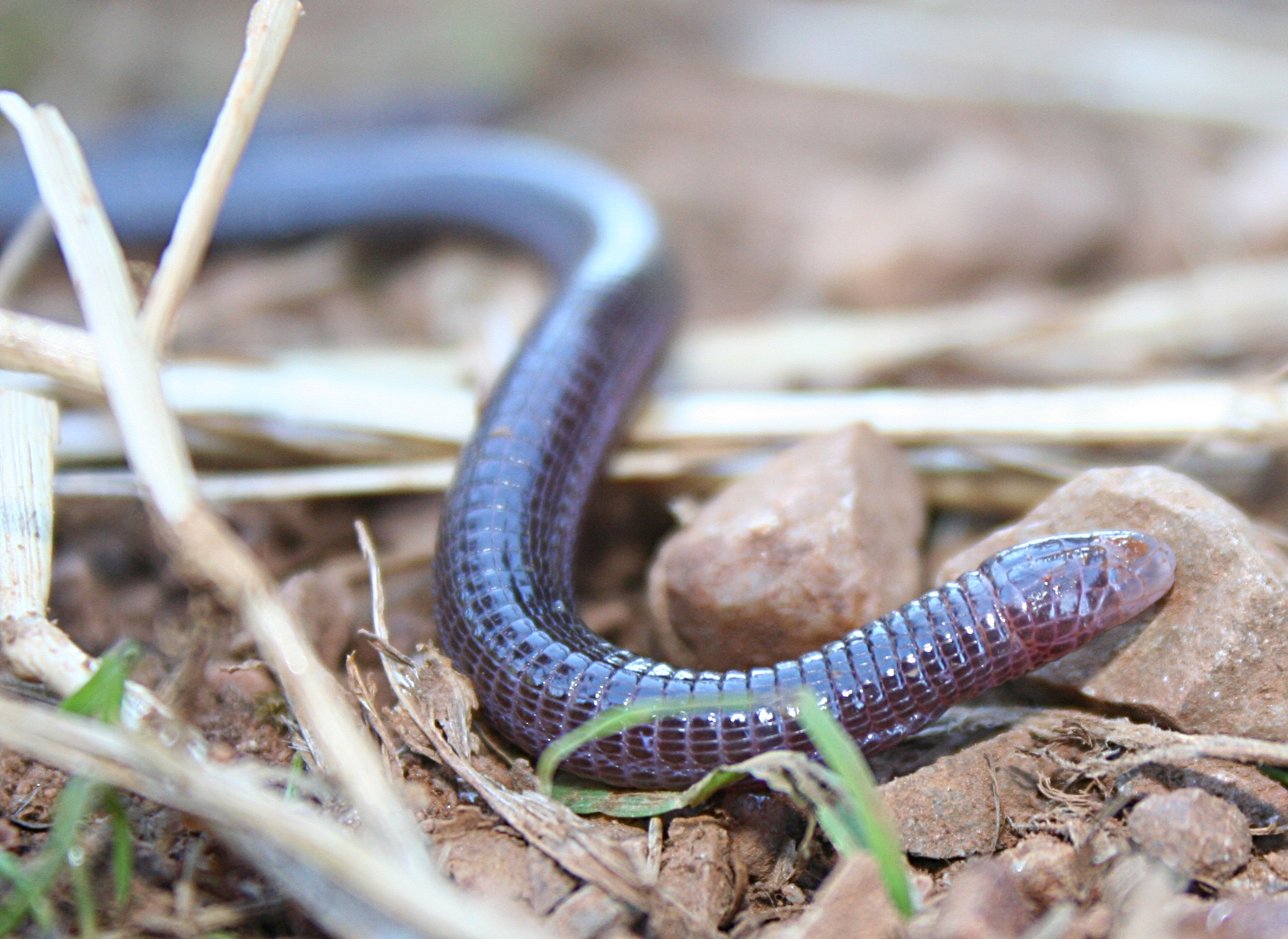
- Iberian worm lizard (Blanus cinereus)

Scientific classification
- Kingdom: Animalia
- Phylum: Chordata
- Class: Reptilia
- Order: Squamata
- Clade: Amphisbaenia
- Family: Blanidae; Kearney, 2003
- Genus: Blanus; Wagler, 1830

= Blanus =

Genus of amphisbaenians

Blanus, also known as worm lizards, are a genus of amphisbaenians found in the Mediterranean region of Europe and North Africa. Like other amphisbaenians, Blanus species are specialized for a subterranean existence, with long, slender bodies, reduced limbs, and rudimentary eyes. Their skulls are powerfully constructed, allowing them to push through soil to create a burrow. Their jaws are well-developed, with large, recurved teeth and a pair of canine-like teeth in the upper jaw.

Four to seven extant species are currently known. The relationships of Blanus to other worm-lizards are not clear. The genus was formerly included in the Amphisbaenidae. More recent analyses suggest that blanids are more primitive, and are either related to Bipes or represent an even more ancient lineage.

A number of fossils from Europe have been referred either to Blanus or to the Blanidae.

== Species ==
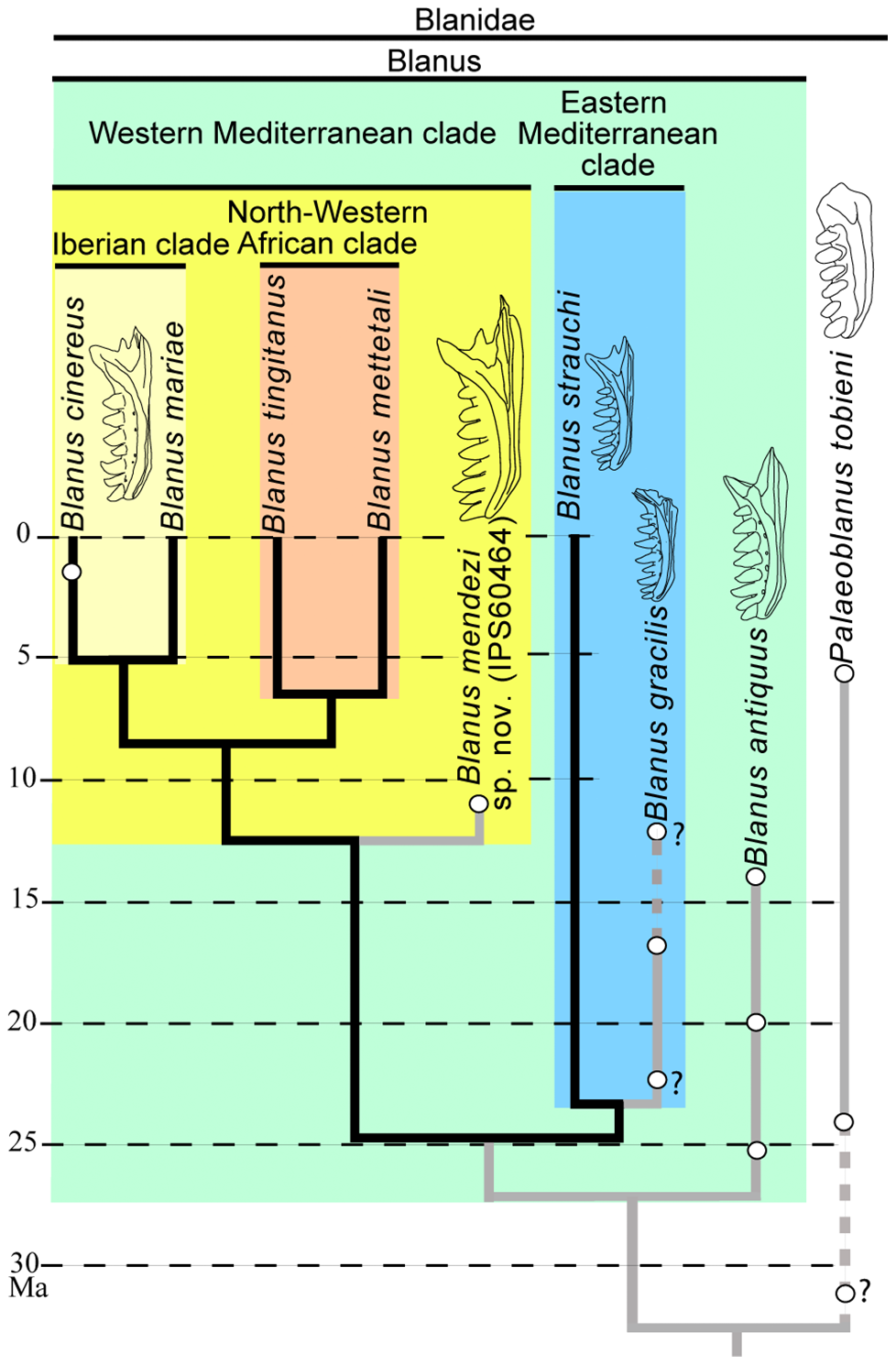
Evolutionary tree of Blanidae; extinct species denoted with gray lines

The genus contains the following species:

- Blanus alexandri Sindaco, Kornilios, Sacchi & Lymberakis, 2014
- Blanus aporus Werner, 1898
- Blanus cinereus (Vandelli, 1797) – Iberian worm lizard
- Blanus mendezi † Bolet et al., 2014
- Blanus mettetali Bons, 1963 – Moroccan worm lizard
- Blanus strauchi (Bedriaga, 1884) – Turkish worm lizard
- Blanus tingitanus Busack, 1988

Nota bene: A binomial authority in parentheses indicates that the species was originally described in a genus other than Blanus.
