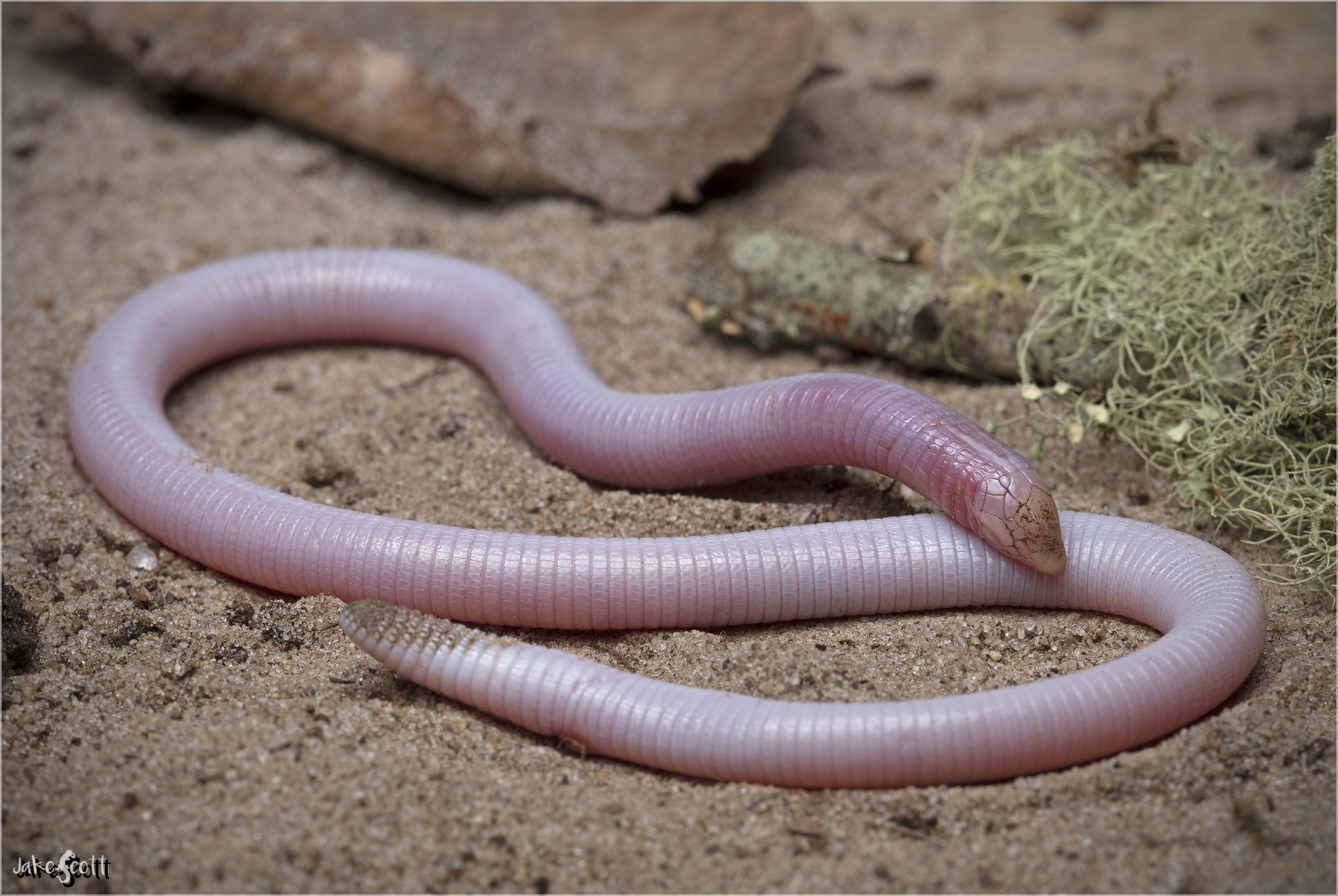

Conservation status
- Least Concern (IUCN 3.1)

- Vulnerable (NatureServe)

Scientific classification
- Kingdom: Animalia
- Phylum: Chordata
- Class: Reptilia
- Order: Squamata
- Clade: Amphisbaenia
- Family: Rhineuridae
- Genus: Rhineura
- Species: R. floridana

Binomial name
- Rhineura floridana (Baird, 1858)

Synonyms
- Lepidosternon floridanum Baird, 1858; Rhineura floridana — Garman, 1883

= Rhineura floridana =

Species of reptile

Rhineura floridana, known commonly as the Florida worm lizard, graveyard snake, or thunderworm, is a species of amphisbaenian in the family Rhineuridae. The species is the only extant member of the genus Rhineura, and is found primarily in Florida but has been recorded in Lanier County, Georgia. There are no subspecies that are recognized as being valid.

== Description ==
R. floridana varies in total length (including tail) from 18–41 cm (7–16 in). The head has a shovel-like snout that projects forward past the lower jaws, which is used for burrowing. The eyes are highly reduced and not visible externally. The limbs are absent and, as in other Amphisbaenia, the body is covered by scales arranged in rings giving the animal a worm-like appearance.

== Habitat ==
The preferred natural habitats of R. floridana are forest and shrubland. More specifically, in xeric and mesic hammocks around northeastern and central Florida. Southern populations have been shown to prefer xeric hammocks.

== Behavior ==
R. floridana is a burrower, preferring a soil, sand, or leaf mold substrate, and spending most of its time underground where it is safe from predators. It surfaces only when heavy rain or plowing forces it to evacuate its burrow. Because of the former, it is sometimes called thunderworm. When disturbed, it retreats into its burrow tail-first.

== Diet ==
The diet of R. floridana includes insects and earthworms, but it is an opportunistic feeder and will eat almost any invertebrate small enough to catch.

== Reproduction ==
Reproduction in R. floridana is by laying eggs (oviparity).

== Conservation status ==
Rhineura floridana is classified as Least Concern on the IUCN Red List of Threatened Species. Species are listed as such due to their wide distribution, presumed large population, or because it is unlikely to be declining fast enough to qualify for listing in a more threatened category. The population trend is stable.
