= Cynisca senegalensis =

Conservation status
- Data Deficient (IUCN 3.1)

Scientific classification
- Kingdom: Animalia
- Phylum: Chordata
- Class: Reptilia
- Order: Squamata
- Clade: Amphisbaenia
- Family: Amphisbaenidae
- Genus: Cynisca
- Species: C. senegalensis

Binomial name
- Cynisca senegalensis Gans, 1987
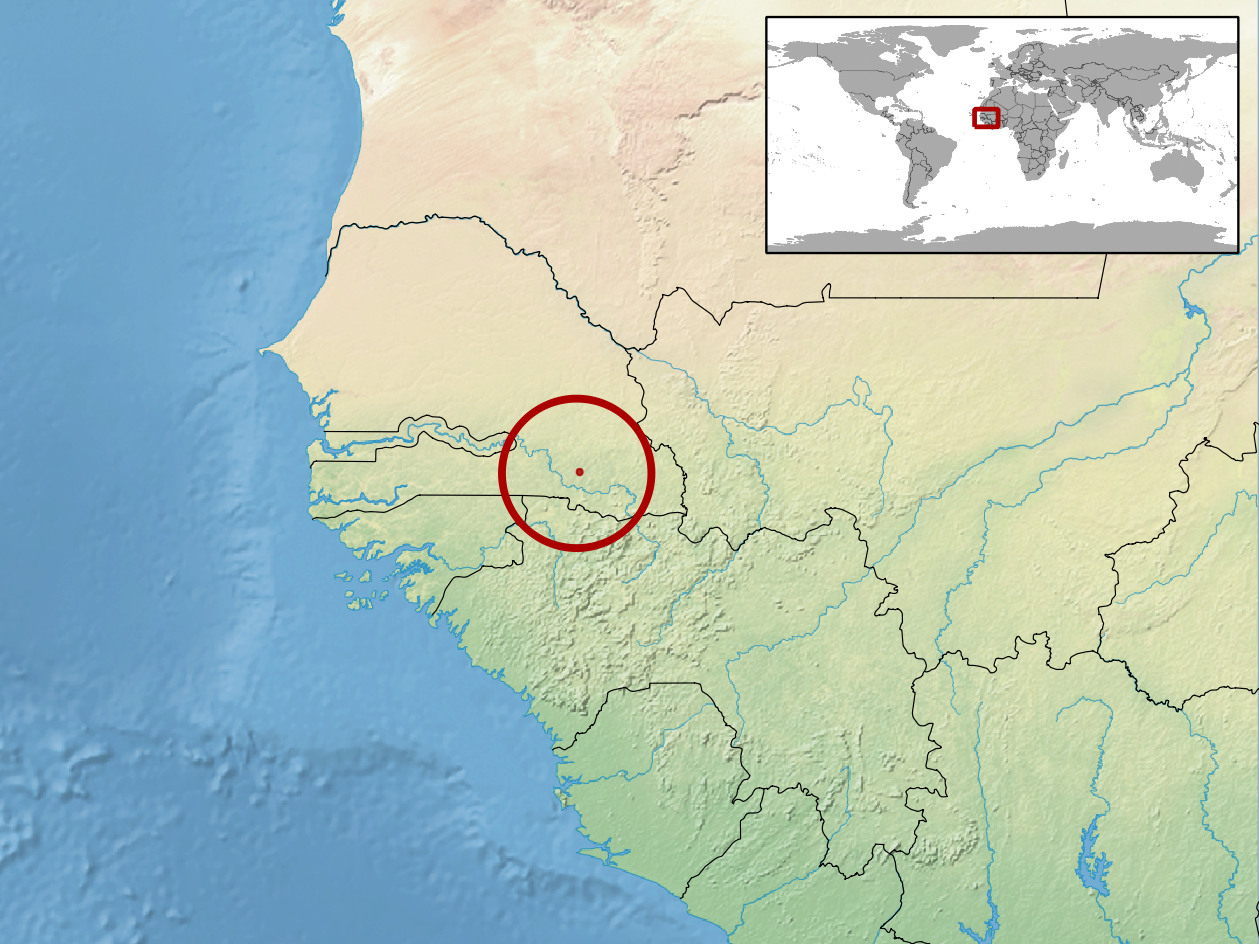

Species of lizard

Cynisca senegalensis is a worm lizard species in the family Amphisbaenidae. It is found in Senegal and Guinea.
