= Zygaspis nigra =

Conservation status
- Least Concern (IUCN 3.1)

Scientific classification
- Kingdom: Animalia
- Phylum: Chordata
- Class: Reptilia
- Order: Squamata
- Clade: Amphisbaenia
- Family: Amphisbaenidae
- Genus: Zygaspis
- Species: Z. nigra

Binomial name
- Zygaspis nigra Broadley & Gans, 1969
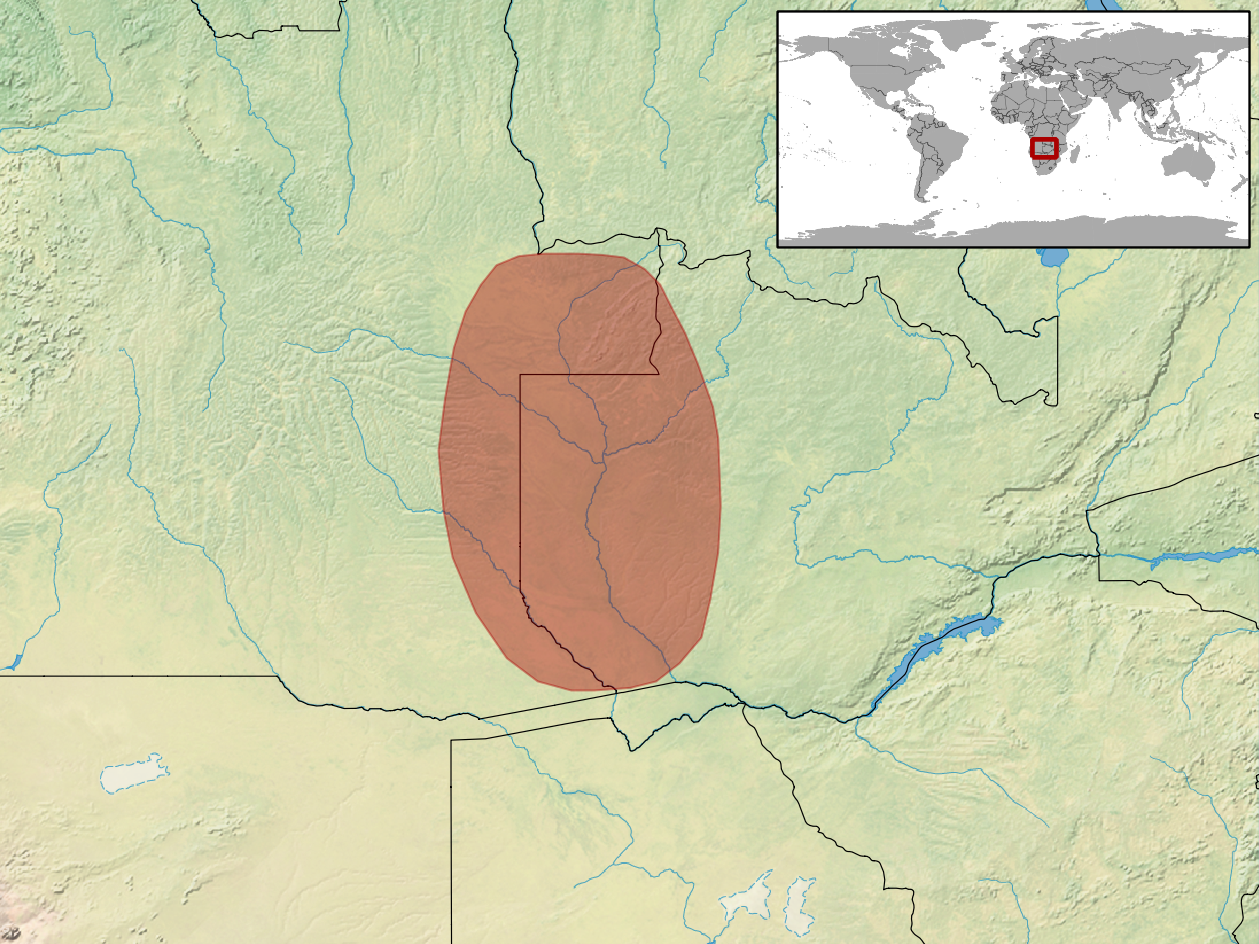

Synonyms
- Zygaspis niger Broadley & Gans, 1969; Zygaspis nigra Broadley & S. Broadley, 1997

Species of lizard

Zygaspis nigra is a worm lizard species in the family Amphisbaenidae. The species is endemic to southern Africa.

== Geographic range ==
Z. nigra is found in Angola, Botswana, the Caprivi strip, and Zambia.

== Habitat ==
The preferred habitat of Z. nigra is woodland on sandy soil.

== Description ==
A large worm lizard, Z. nigra may attain a snout-to-vent length (SVL) of 28 cm (11 in). It is colored black and white, with a speckled or marbled appearance. It is more blackish dorsally, and is more whitish ventrally. The snout is rounded.

== Reproduction ==
Z. nigra is oviparous.
