= Cynisca williamsi =

Conservation status
- Data Deficient (IUCN 3.1)

Scientific classification
- Kingdom: Animalia
- Phylum: Chordata
- Class: Reptilia
- Order: Squamata
- Clade: Amphisbaenia
- Family: Amphisbaenidae
- Genus: Cynisca
- Species: C. williamsi

Binomial name
- Cynisca williamsi Gans, 1987

Species of lizard

Cynisca williamsi is a worm lizard species in the family Amphisbaenidae. It is endemic to Ghana.
