= Ugly worm lizard =

Conservation status
- Least Concern (IUCN 3.1)

Scientific classification
- Kingdom: Animalia
- Phylum: Chordata
- Class: Reptilia
- Order: Squamata
- Clade: Amphisbaenia
- Family: Amphisbaenidae
- Genus: Cynisca
- Species: C. feae

Binomial name
- Cynisca feae (Boulenger, 1906)
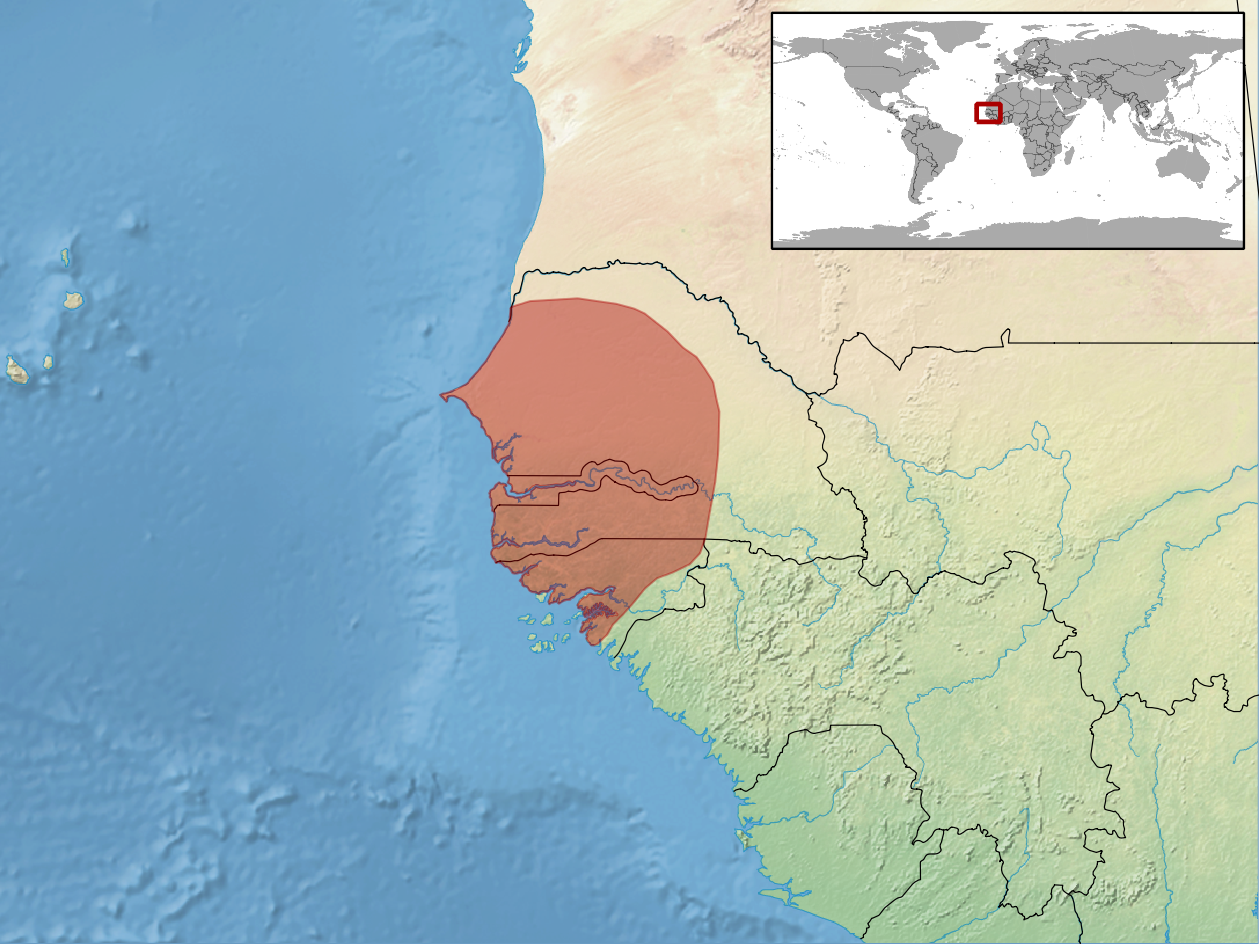

Synonyms
- Placogaster feae Boulenger, 1906; Cynisca feae — Gans, 1987

Species of lizard

The ugly worm lizard (Cynisca feae) is a species of amphisbaenian in the family Amphisbaenidae. The species is native to West Africa.

== Etymology ==
The specific name, feae, is in honor of Leonardo Fea, who was an Italian explorer and naturalist.

== Geographic range ==
C. feae is found in The Gambia, Guinea, Guinea-Bissau, and Senegal.

== Habitat ==
The preferred natural habitat of C. feae is forest.

== Description ==
C. feae may attain a snout-to-vent length (SVL) of 16 cm (6.3 in) and a tail length of 1.5 cm (0.59 in). It is pale brown dorsally, and white ventrally. It has a single series of wide median ventral segments, each of which is six times wider than long.

== Behavior ==
C. feae is terrestrial and fossorial.

== Reproduction ==
C. feae is oviparous.
