= Swynnerton's worm lizard =

Scientific classification
- Kingdom: Animalia
- Phylum: Chordata
- Class: Reptilia
- Order: Squamata
- Clade: Amphisbaenia
- Family: Amphisbaenidae
- Genus: Chirindia
- Species: C. swynnertoni

Binomial name
- Chirindia swynnertoni Boulenger, 1907

Synonyms
- Chirindia swynnertoni Boulenger, 1907; Amphisbaenula orientalis Sternfeld, 1911; Chirindia bushbyi Cott, 1934; Amphisbaena swynnertoni — V. FitzSimons, 1943; Chirindia swynnertoni — Broadley & Howell, 1991

Species of amphisbaenian

Swynnerton's worm lizard (Chirindia swynnertoni), also known commonly as Swynnerton's round-headed worm lizard, is a species of amphisbaenian in the family Amphisbaenidae. The species is native to eastern Africa and southern Africa.

== Etymology ==
The specific name, swynnertoni, is in honor of British entomologist Charles Francis Massy Swynnerton.

== Geographic range ==
C. swynnertoni is found in Mozambique, Tanzania, and Zimbabwe.

== Habitat ==
The preferred natural habitats of C. swynnertoni are grassland and thicket.

== Description ==
C. swynnertoni may attain a snout-to-vent length (SVL) of 14 cm (5.5 in). It is uniformly pale purplish pink.

== Reproduction ==
C. swynnertoni is oviparous.
