= Cynisca rouxae =

Conservation status
- Data Deficient (IUCN 3.1)

Scientific classification
- Kingdom: Animalia
- Phylum: Chordata
- Class: Reptilia
- Order: Squamata
- Clade: Amphisbaenia
- Family: Amphisbaenidae
- Genus: Cynisca
- Species: C. rouxae

Binomial name
- Cynisca rouxae Hahn, 1979

Species of lizard

Cynisca rouxae is a worm lizard species in the family Amphisbaenidae. The species is endemic to the Ivory Coast.

== Etymology ==
The specific name, rouxae (genitive, feminine, singular), is in honor of French herpetologist Mme. Rolande Roux-Estève.

== Habitat ==
The preferred habitats of C. rouxae are forest and savanna.

== Reproduction ==
C. rouxae is oviparous.
