= Udjiji worm lizard =

Conservation status
- Data Deficient (IUCN 3.1)

Scientific classification
- Kingdom: Animalia
- Phylum: Chordata
- Class: Reptilia
- Order: Squamata
- Clade: Amphisbaenia
- Family: Amphisbaenidae
- Genus: Loveridgea
- Species: L. phylofiniens

Binomial name
- Loveridgea phylofiniens (Tornier, 1899)

Species of lizard

The Udjiji worm lizard (Loveridgea phylofiniens) is a worm lizard species in the family Amphisbaenidae. It is found in Tanzania.
