= Liberia worm lizard =

Conservation status
- Least Concern (IUCN 3.1)

Scientific classification
- Kingdom: Animalia
- Phylum: Chordata
- Class: Reptilia
- Order: Squamata
- Clade: Amphisbaenia
- Family: Amphisbaenidae
- Genus: Cynisca
- Species: C. liberiensis

Binomial name
- Cynisca liberiensis (Boulenger, 1878)

Species of lizard

The Liberia worm lizard (Cynisca liberiensis) is a worm lizard species in the family Amphisbaenidae. It is found in Liberia, Sierra Leone, and Guinea.
