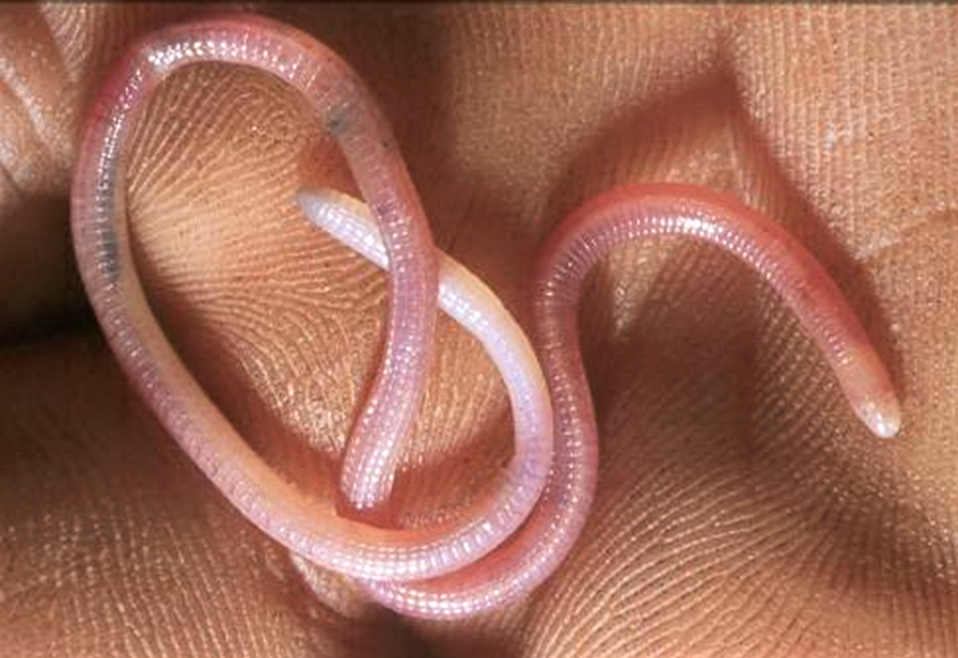

Conservation status
- Least Concern (IUCN 3.1)

Scientific classification
- Kingdom: Animalia
- Phylum: Chordata
- Class: Reptilia
- Order: Squamata
- Clade: Amphisbaenia
- Family: Amphisbaenidae
- Genus: Cynisca
- Species: C. bifrontalis

Binomial name
- Cynisca bifrontalis (Boulenger, 1906)
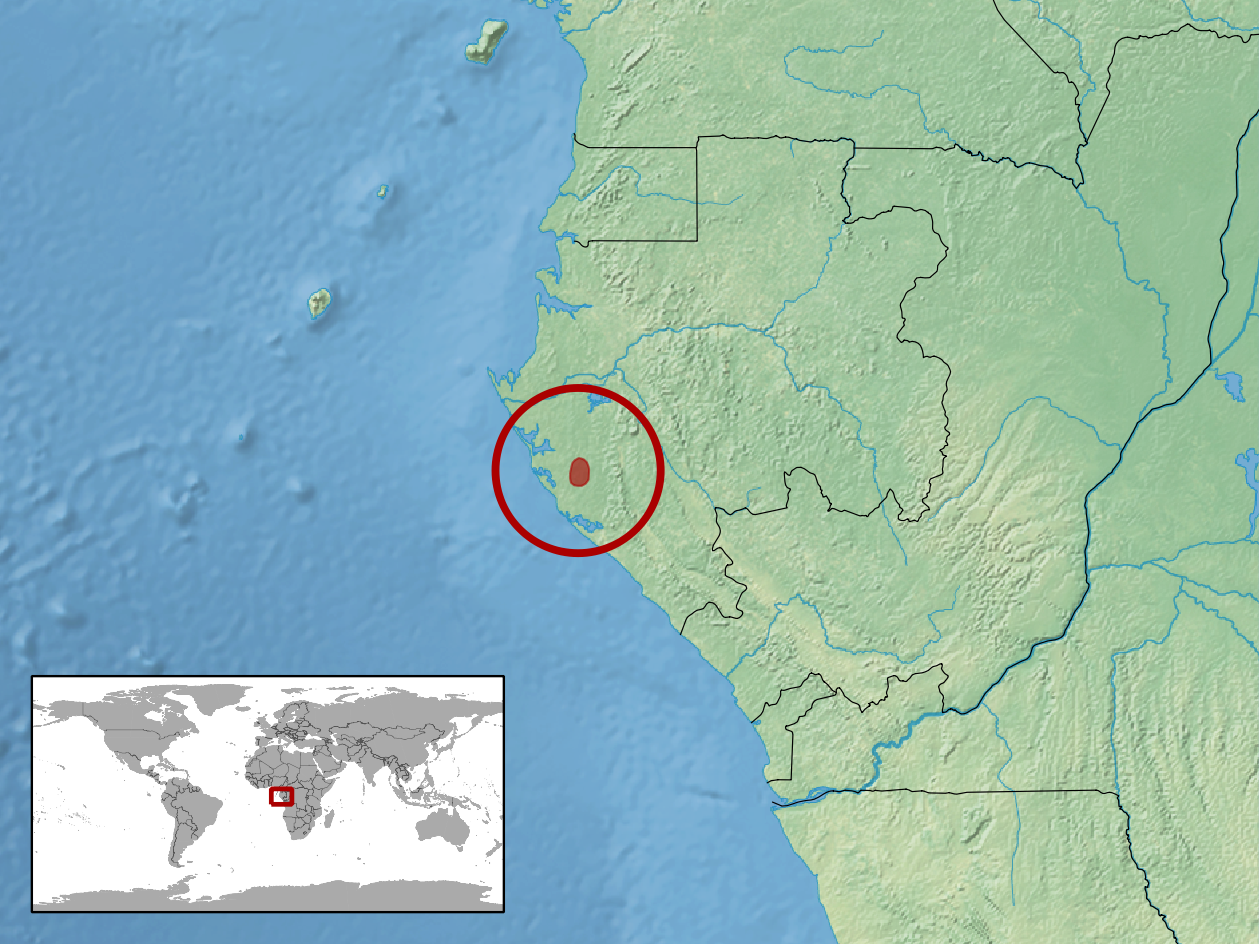

= French Congo worm lizard =

Species of lizard

The French Congo worm lizard (Cynisca bifrontalis) is a worm lizard species in the family Amphisbaenidae. It is endemic to Gabon.
