= Mpwapwa worm lizard =

Conservation status
- Data Deficient (IUCN 3.1)

Scientific classification
- Kingdom: Animalia
- Phylum: Chordata
- Class: Reptilia
- Order: Squamata
- Clade: Amphisbaenia
- Family: Amphisbaenidae
- Genus: Chirindia
- Species: C. mpwapwaensis

Binomial name
- Chirindia mpwapwaensis (Loveridge, 1932)

Species of amphisbaenian

The Mpwapwa worm lizard (Chirindia mpwapwaensis) is an amphisbaenian species in the family Amphisbaenidae. The species is endemic to Tanzania.
