= Haug's worm lizard =

Conservation status
- Least Concern (IUCN 3.1)

Scientific classification
- Kingdom: Animalia
- Phylum: Chordata
- Class: Reptilia
- Order: Squamata
- Clade: Amphisbaenia
- Family: Amphisbaenidae
- Genus: Cynisca
- Species: C. haugi

Binomial name
- Cynisca haugi (Mocquard, 1904)

Synonyms
- Amphisbaena haugi Mocquard, 1904

Species of lizard

Haug's worm lizard (Cynisca haugi) is a species of amphisbaenian in the family Amphisbaenidae. The species is endemic to Gabon.

== Etymology ==
The specific name, haugi, is in honor of Protestant missionary Ernest Haug (died 1915), who collected specimens for the Muséum national d'histoire naturelle (Paris).

== Geographic range ==
Within Gabon, C. haugi is found in Moyen-Ogooué Province.

== Habitat ==
The preferred natural habitat of C. haugi is unknown.

== Description ==
The species C. haugi is small and relatively slender for its genus. The holotype has a snout-to-vent length (SVL) of 12.4 cm (4.9 in), plus a tail length of 1.6 cm (0.63 in).

== Behavior ==
C. haugi is terrestrial and fossorial.

== Reproduction ==
C. haugi is oviparous.
