= Inirida worm lizard =

Conservation status
- Least Concern (IUCN 3.1)

Scientific classification
- Kingdom: Animalia
- Phylum: Chordata
- Class: Reptilia
- Order: Squamata
- Clade: Amphisbaenia
- Family: Amphisbaenidae
- Genus: Mesobaena
- Species: M. huebneri

Binomial name
- Mesobaena huebneri Mertens, 1925

Species of lizard

The Inirida worm lizard (Mesobaena huebneri) is a species of amphisbaenian in the family Amphisbaenidae. The species is native to Colombia and Venezuela.

== Etymology ==
The specific name, huebneri, is in honor of German pioneer photographer George Huebner, who collected the holotype.

== Habitat ==
The preferred natural habitat of M. huebneri is forest.

== Behavior ==
M. huebneri is terrestrial and fossorial.

== Reproduction ==
M. huebneri is oviparous.

== Taxonomy ==
M. huebneri is the type species of the genus Mesobaena.
