= Amphisbaena cegei =

Conservation status
- Least Concern (IUCN 3.1)

Scientific classification
- Kingdom: Animalia
- Phylum: Chordata
- Class: Reptilia
- Order: Squamata
- Clade: Amphisbaenia
- Family: Amphisbaenidae
- Genus: Amphisbaena
- Species: A. cegei

Binomial name
- Amphisbaena cegei Montero, Sáfadez & Álvarez, 1997

Species of amphisbaenian

Amphisbaena cegei is a species of amphisbaenian in the family Amphisbaenidae. The species is endemic to Bolivia.

== Etymology ==
The specific name, cegei, is in honor of American herpetologist Carl Gans, based on his initials C. G.

== Geographic range ==
A. cegei is found in Santa Cruz Department, Bolivia.

== Habitat ==
The preferred habitat of A. cegei is forest at altitudes of 700–2,100 m (2,300–6,900 ft).

== Diet ==
A. cegei preys upon earthworms and termites.

== Reproduction ==
A. cegei is oviparous.
