= Zygaspis violacea =

Scientific classification
- Kingdom: Animalia
- Phylum: Chordata
- Class: Reptilia
- Order: Squamata
- Clade: Amphisbaenia
- Family: Amphisbaenidae
- Genus: Zygaspis
- Species: Z. violacea

Binomial name
- Zygaspis violacea (Peters, 1854)

Species of lizard

Zygaspis violacea is a worm lizard species in the family Amphisbaenidae. It is endemic to Mozambique.
