= Zygaspis kafuensis =

Conservation status
- Least Concern (IUCN 3.1)

Scientific classification
- Kingdom: Animalia
- Phylum: Chordata
- Class: Reptilia
- Order: Squamata
- Clade: Amphisbaenia
- Family: Amphisbaenidae
- Genus: Zygaspis
- Species: Z. kafuensis

Binomial name
- Zygaspis kafuensis Broadley & Broadley, 1997
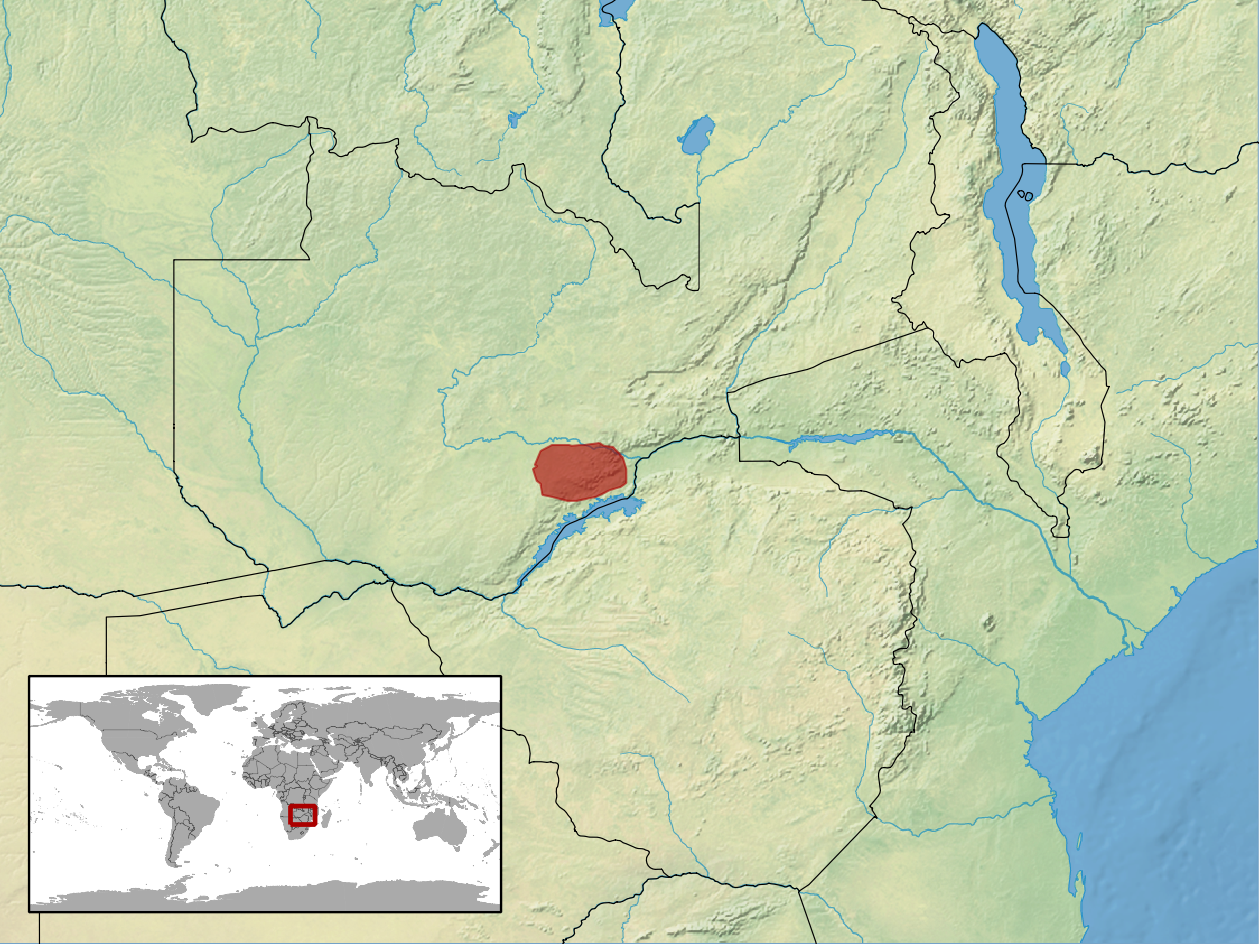

Species of lizard

Zygaspis kafuensis is a worm lizard species in the family Amphisbaenidae. It is endemic to Zambia. Its type locality is located in the Kafue National Park.
