= Zygaspis dolichomenta =

Scientific classification
- Kingdom: Animalia
- Phylum: Chordata
- Class: Reptilia
- Order: Squamata
- Clade: Amphisbaenia
- Family: Amphisbaenidae
- Genus: Zygaspis
- Species: Z. dolichomenta

Binomial name
- Zygaspis dolichomenta de Witte & Laurent, 1942

Species of lizard

Zygaspis dolichomenta is a worm lizard species in the family Amphisbaenidae. It is endemic to the Democratic Republic of the Congo.
