= Mpwapwa wedge-snouted worm lizard =

Scientific classification
- Kingdom: Animalia
- Phylum: Chordata
- Class: Reptilia
- Order: Squamata
- Clade: Amphisbaenia
- Family: Amphisbaenidae
- Genus: Geocalamus
- Species: G. modestus

Binomial name
- Geocalamus modestus Günther, 1880

Species of lizard

The Mpwapwa wedge-snouted worm lizard (Geocalamus modestus) is a worm lizard species in the family Amphisbaenidae. It is endemic to Tanzania.
