= Mesobaena rhachicephala =

Conservation status
- Least Concern (IUCN 3.1)

Scientific classification
- Kingdom: Animalia
- Phylum: Chordata
- Class: Reptilia
- Order: Squamata
- Clade: Amphisbaenia
- Family: Amphisbaenidae
- Genus: Mesobaena
- Species: M. rhachicephala

Binomial name
- Mesobaena rhachicephala Hoogmoed, Pinto, Rocha & Pereira, 2009

Species of lizard

Mesobaena rhachicephala is a species of amphisbaenian in the family Amphisbaenidae. The species is native to Brazil.

== Geographic range ==
M. rhachicephala is endemic to the Brazilian state of Pará.

== Habitat ==
The preferred natural habitat of M. rhachicephala is forest.

== Description ==
M. rhachicephala may attain a snout-to-vent length (SVL) of about 25 cm (9.8 in). Dorsally, it is pink anteriorly, brown posteriorly, and dark brown at the tail tip; ventrally, it is cream-colored.

== Behavior ==
M. rhachicephala is terrestrial and fossorial. Specimens have been found at a depth of 30 cm (12 in) in sandy soil.

== Reproduction ==
M. rhachicephala is oviparous.
