= Ghana worm lizard =

Conservation status
- Data Deficient (IUCN 3.1)

Scientific classification
- Kingdom: Animalia
- Phylum: Chordata
- Class: Reptilia
- Order: Squamata
- Clade: Amphisbaenia
- Family: Amphisbaenidae
- Genus: Cynisca
- Species: C. kraussi

Binomial name
- Cynisca kraussi (W. Peters, 1878)

Synonyms
- Amphisbaena kraussi W. Peters, 1878

Species of legless lizard

The Ghana worm lizard (Cynisca kraussi) is a species of amphisbaenian in the family Amphisbaenidae. The species is endemic to Ghana.

== Etymology ==
The specific name, kraussi, is in honor of German naturalist Christian Ferdinand Friedrich von Krauss.

== Description ==
C. kraussi has 208–226 body annuli, and 16–19 tail annuli. At midbody an annulus has 14–20 dorsal segments, and 12–16 ventral segments. There are eight precloacal pores, which are large and round.

== Geographic range ==
C. kraussi is found in southeastern Ghana.

== Habitat ==
The preferred natural habitat of C. kraussi is forest, at altitudes from sea level to 500 m (1,600 ft).

== Behavior ==
C. kraussi is terrestrial and fossorial.

== Reproduction ==
C. kraussi is oviparous.
