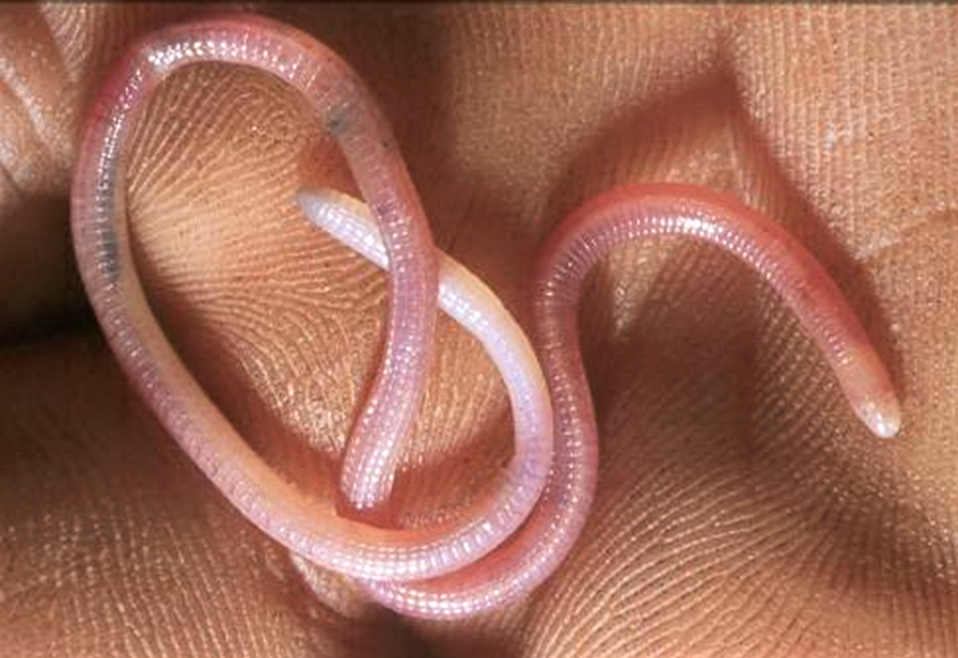
- Worm Lizard

Scientific classification
- Kingdom: Animalia
- Phylum: Chordata
- Class: Reptilia
- Order: Squamata
- Clade: Amphisbaenia
- Family: Amphisbaenidae
- Genus: Cynisca; A.M.C. Duméril & Bibron, 1839

Species
- see text

= Cynisca (lizard) =

Genus of lizards

Cynisca is a genus in the family Amphisbaenidae, commonly known as worm lizards. 20 species are placed in this genus, all of them native to West Africa.

== Species ==
- Cynisca bifrontalis (Boulenger, 1906) - French Congo worm lizard
- Cynisca chirioi J.-F. Trape, Mané & Baldé, 2014
- Cynisca degrysi (Loveridge, 1941) - Sierra Leone worm lizard
- Cynisca feae (Boulenger, 1906) - ugly worm lizard
- Cynisca gansi Dunger, 1968
- Cynisca haugi (Mocquard, 1904) - Haug's worm lizard
- Cynisca ivoirensis Trape & Mané, 2014
- Cynisca kigomensis Dunger, 1968
- Cynisca kraussi (W. Peters, 1878) - Ghana worm lizard
- Cynisca leonina (F. Müller, 1885) - Los Archipelago worm lizard
- Cynisca leucura (A.M.C. Duméril & Bibron, 1839) - coast worm lizard
- Cynisca liberiensis (Boulenger, 1878) - Liberia worm lizard
- Cynisca manei J.-F. Trape, 2014
- Cynisca muelleri (Strauch, 1881)
- Cynisca nigeriensis Dunger, 1968
- Cynisca oligopholis (Boulenger, 1906) - Cassine River worm lizard
- Cynisca rouxae Hahn, 1979
- Cynisca schaeferi (Sternfeld, 1912) - Cameroon worm lizard
- Cynisca senegalensis Gans, 1987
- Cynisca williamsi Gans, 1987

Nota bene: A binomial authority in parentheses indicates that the species was originally described in a genus other than Cynisca.
