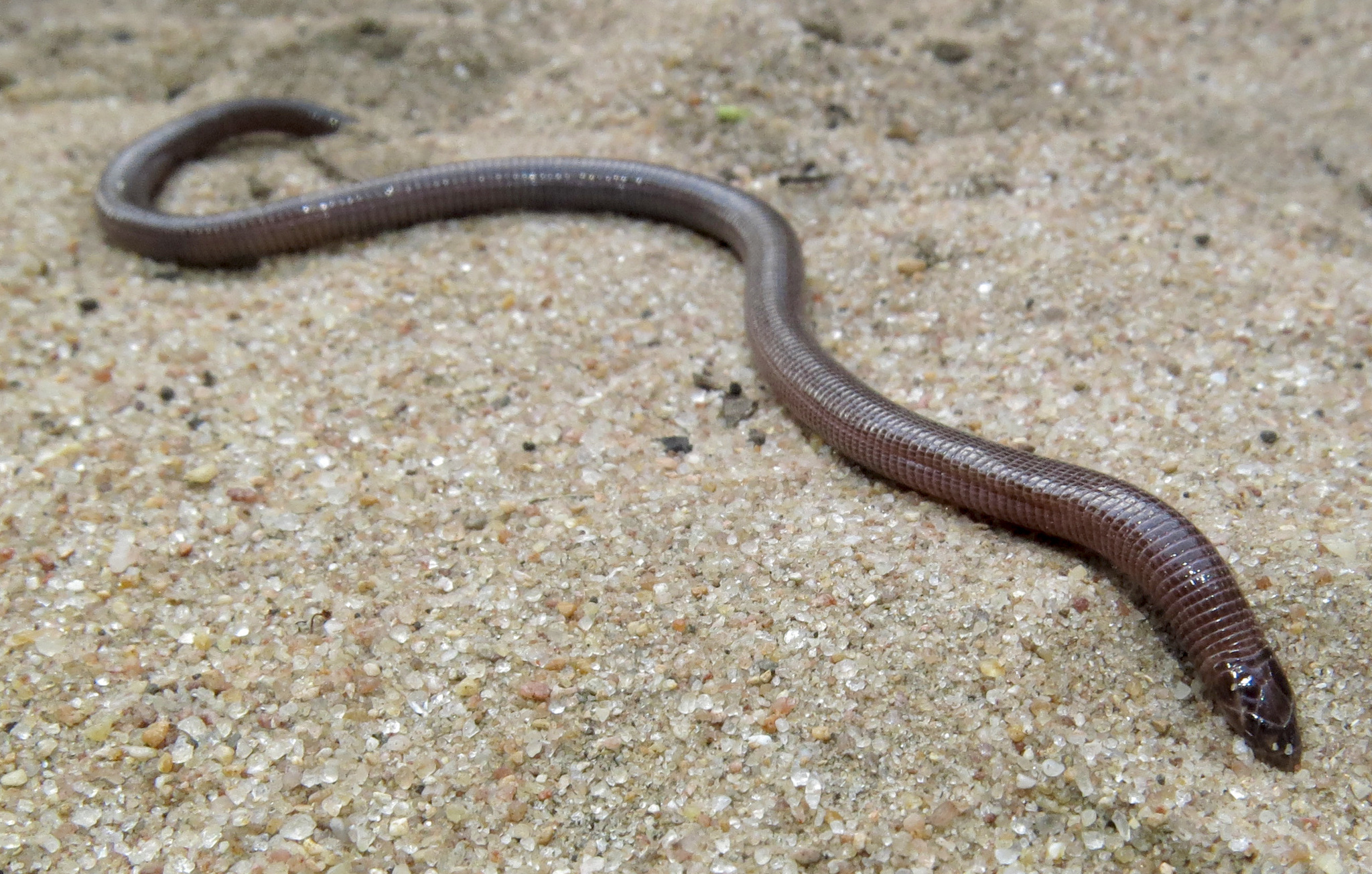

Conservation status
- Least Concern (IUCN 3.1)

Scientific classification
- Kingdom: Animalia
- Phylum: Chordata
- Class: Reptilia
- Order: Squamata
- Clade: Amphisbaenia
- Family: Amphisbaenidae
- Genus: Zygaspis
- Species: Z. vandami

Binomial name
- Zygaspis vandami (V. FitzSimons, 1930)

Synonyms
- Amphisbaena vandami V. FitzSimons, 1930; Zygaspis violacea vandami — V. FitzSimons, 1943; Zygaspis vandami – D. Broadley & S. Broadley, 1997

= Van Dam's dwarf worm lizard =

Species of lizard

Van Dam's dwarf worm lizard (Zygaspis vandami), also known commonly as the sand-dwelling dwarf worm lizard and Van Dam's round-headed worm lizard, is a species of amphisbaenian in the family Amphisbaenidae. The species is native to southern Africa. There are two recognized subspecies.

== Etymology ==
The specific name, vandami, is in honor of South African Herpetologist Gerhardus Petrus Frederick Van Dam (died 1927).

== Geographic range ==
Z. vandami is found in Mozambique, South Africa, and Zimbabwe.

== Habitat ==
The preferred natural habitats of Z. vandami are sand, sandy-soils, and humus-rich soils.

== Description ==
One of the smaller species in its genus, Z. vandami usually has a snout-to-vent length (SVL) of 13–17 cm (5.1–6.7 in). The maximum recorded SVL is 18.5 cm (7.3 in). It is uniformly dark purplish brown dorsally, and light purple ventrally. The chin and the anal area are white.

== Behavior ==
A burrowing species, Z. vandami is usually found under logs and stones.

== Reproduction ==
Z. vandami is oviparous.

== Subspecies ==
Two subspecies are recognized as being valid, including the nominotypical subspecies.

- Zygaspis vandami arenicola D. Broadley & S. Broadley, 1997
- Zygaspis vandami vandami (V. FitzSimons, 1930)

Nota bene: A trinomial authority in parentheses indicates that the subspecies was originally described in a genus other than Zygaspis.
