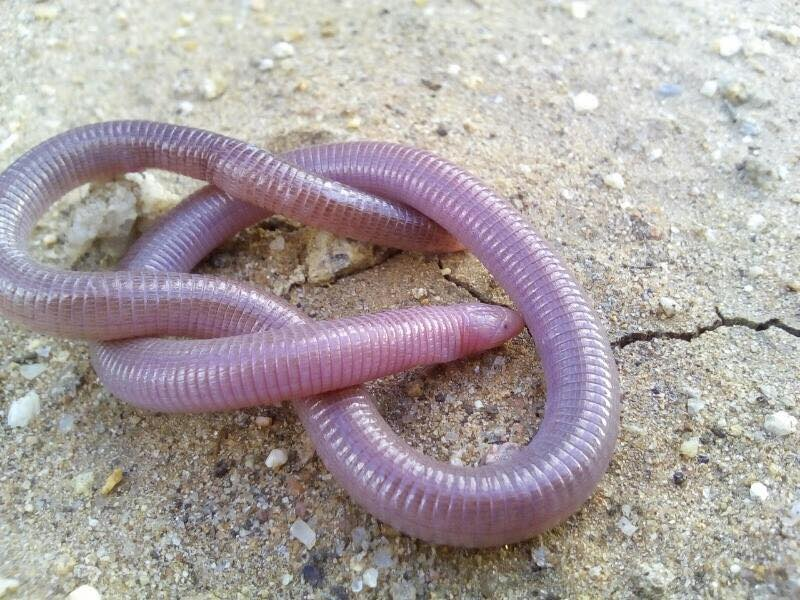

Scientific classification
- Kingdom: Animalia
- Phylum: Chordata
- Class: Reptilia
- Order: Squamata
- Clade: Amphisbaenia
- Family: Amphisbaenidae
- Genus: Zygaspis
- Species: Z. quadrifrons

Binomial name
- Zygaspis quadrifrons (Peters, 1862)

= Zygaspis quadrifrons =

Species of lizard

Zygaspis quadrifrons, also known as the Kalahari dwarf worm lizard or Kalahari round-snouted worm lizard, is a worm lizard species in the family Amphisbaenidae. It is found in southern Africa.
