= Nchingidi worm lizard =

Scientific classification
- Kingdom: Animalia
- Phylum: Chordata
- Class: Reptilia
- Order: Squamata
- Clade: Amphisbaenia
- Family: Amphisbaenidae
- Genus: Chirindia
- Species: C. rondoensis

Binomial name
- Chirindia rondoensis (Loveridge, 1941)

Species of amphisbaenian

The Nchingidi worm lizard (Chirindia rondoensis) is a species of amphisbaenian in the family Amphisbaenidae. The species is endemic to Tanzania.
