= Cameroon worm lizard =

Conservation status
- Endangered (IUCN 3.1)

Scientific classification
- Kingdom: Animalia
- Phylum: Chordata
- Class: Reptilia
- Order: Squamata
- Clade: Amphisbaenia
- Family: Amphisbaenidae
- Genus: Cynisca
- Species: C. schaeferi

Binomial name
- Cynisca schaeferi (Sternfeld, 1912)
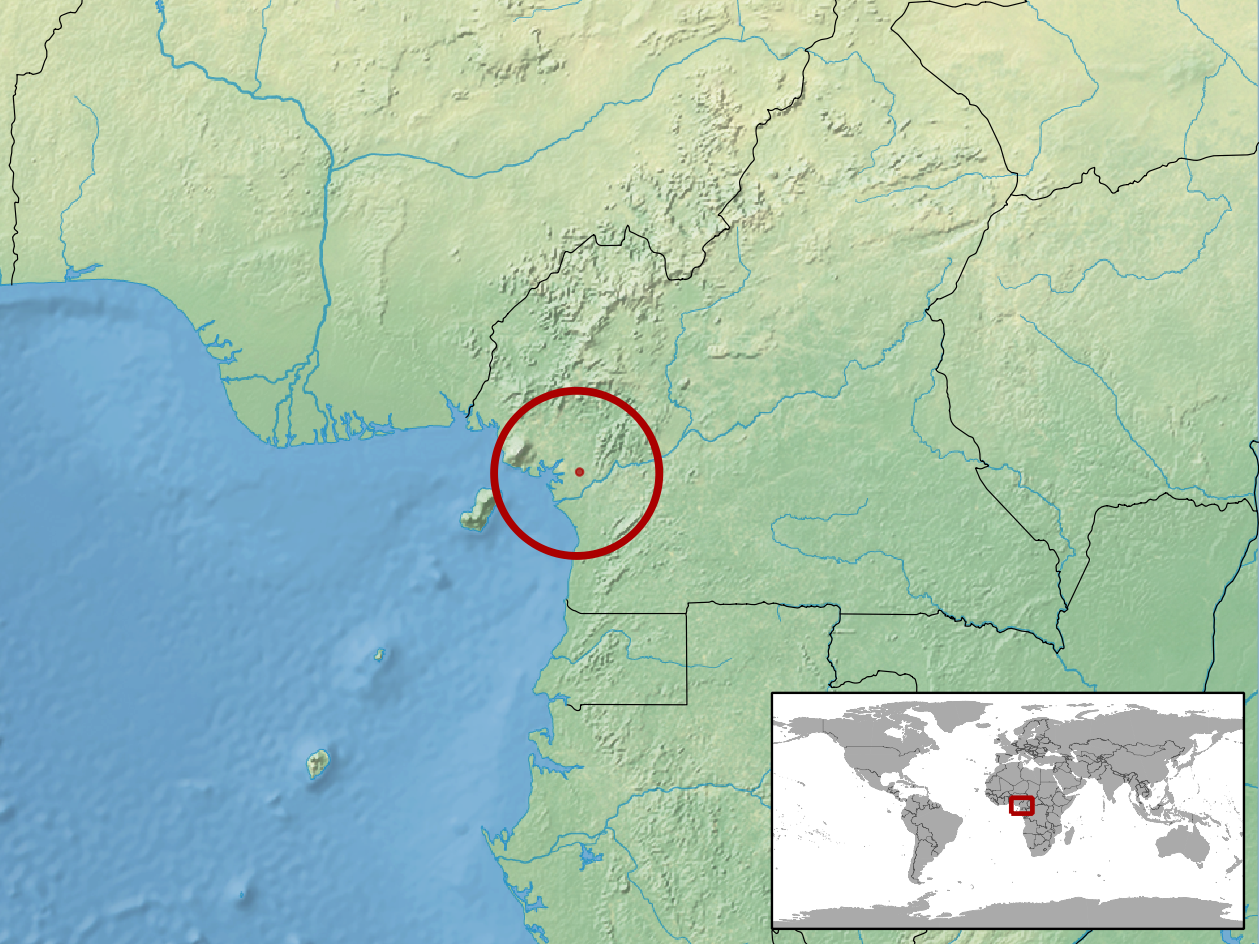

Synonyms
- Chirindia schaeferi Sternfeld, 1912; Cynisca schaeferi — Branch, Pauwels & Burger, 2003

Species of lizard

The Cameroon worm lizard (Cynisca schaeferi) is a species of amphisbaenian in the family Amphisbaenidae. The species is endemic to Cameroon.

== Etymology ==
The specific name, schaeferi, is in honor of German zoologist Hans Schäfer who collected the holotype.

== Description ==
The holotype of Cynisca schaeferi, which is lost, measured 219 mm (8.6 in) in total length, including a tail 23 mm (0.91 in) long.

== Reproduction ==
Cynisca schaeferi is oviparous.
