= Sierra Leone worm lizard =

Conservation status
- Data Deficient (IUCN 3.1)

Scientific classification
- Kingdom: Animalia
- Phylum: Chordata
- Class: Reptilia
- Order: Squamata
- Clade: Amphisbaenia
- Family: Amphisbaenidae
- Genus: Cynisca
- Species: C. degrysi

Binomial name
- Cynisca degrysi (Loveridge, 1941)

Synonyms
- Placogaster degrysi Loveridge, 1941; Cynisca degrysi — Branch et al., 2003

Species of lizard

The Sierra Leone worm lizard (Cynisca degrysi) is a species of amphisbaenian in the family Amphisbaenidae. The species is endemic to Sierra Leone.

== Etymology ==
The specific name, degrysi, is in honor of German zoologist Pedro de Grys.

== Description ==
C. degrysi is pale brown dorsally, and white ventrally. The holotype has a snout-to-vent length (SVL) of 10.7 cm (4.2 in) and a tail length of 1.3 cm (0.51 in).

== Reproduction ==
C. degrysi is oviparous.
