= Cuban pink amphisbaena =

Conservation status
- Near Threatened (IUCN 3.1)

Scientific classification
- Kingdom: Animalia
- Phylum: Chordata
- Class: Reptilia
- Order: Squamata
- Clade: Amphisbaenia
- Family: Amphisbaenidae
- Genus: Amphisbaena
- Species: A. carlgansi

Binomial name
- Amphisbaena carlgansi Thomas & Hedges, 1998

Species of amphisbaenian

The Cuban pink amphisbaena (Amphisbaena carlgansi) is a species of amphisbaenian in the family Amphisbaenidae. The species is endemic to Cuba.

== Etymology ==
The specific name, carlgansi, is in honor of American herpetologist Carl Gans.

== Habitat ==
The preferred habitat of A. carlgansi is forest at altitudes of 0–50 m (0–164 ft).

== Reproduction ==
A. carlgansi is oviparous.
