= Cynisca manei =

Scientific classification
- Kingdom: Animalia
- Phylum: Chordata
- Class: Reptilia
- Order: Squamata
- Clade: Amphisbaenia
- Family: Amphisbaenidae
- Genus: Cynisca
- Species: C. manei

Binomial name
- Cynisca manei Trape, 2014

Species of lizard

Cynisca manei is a worm lizard species in the family Amphisbaenidae. It is endemic to Senegal and Guinea-Bissau.
