= Liwale round-snouted worm lizard =

Conservation status
- Least Concern (IUCN 3.1)

Scientific classification
- Kingdom: Animalia
- Phylum: Chordata
- Class: Reptilia
- Order: Squamata
- Clade: Amphisbaenia
- Family: Amphisbaenidae
- Genus: Loveridgea
- Species: L. ionidesii

Binomial name
- Loveridgea ionidesii (Battersby, 1950)
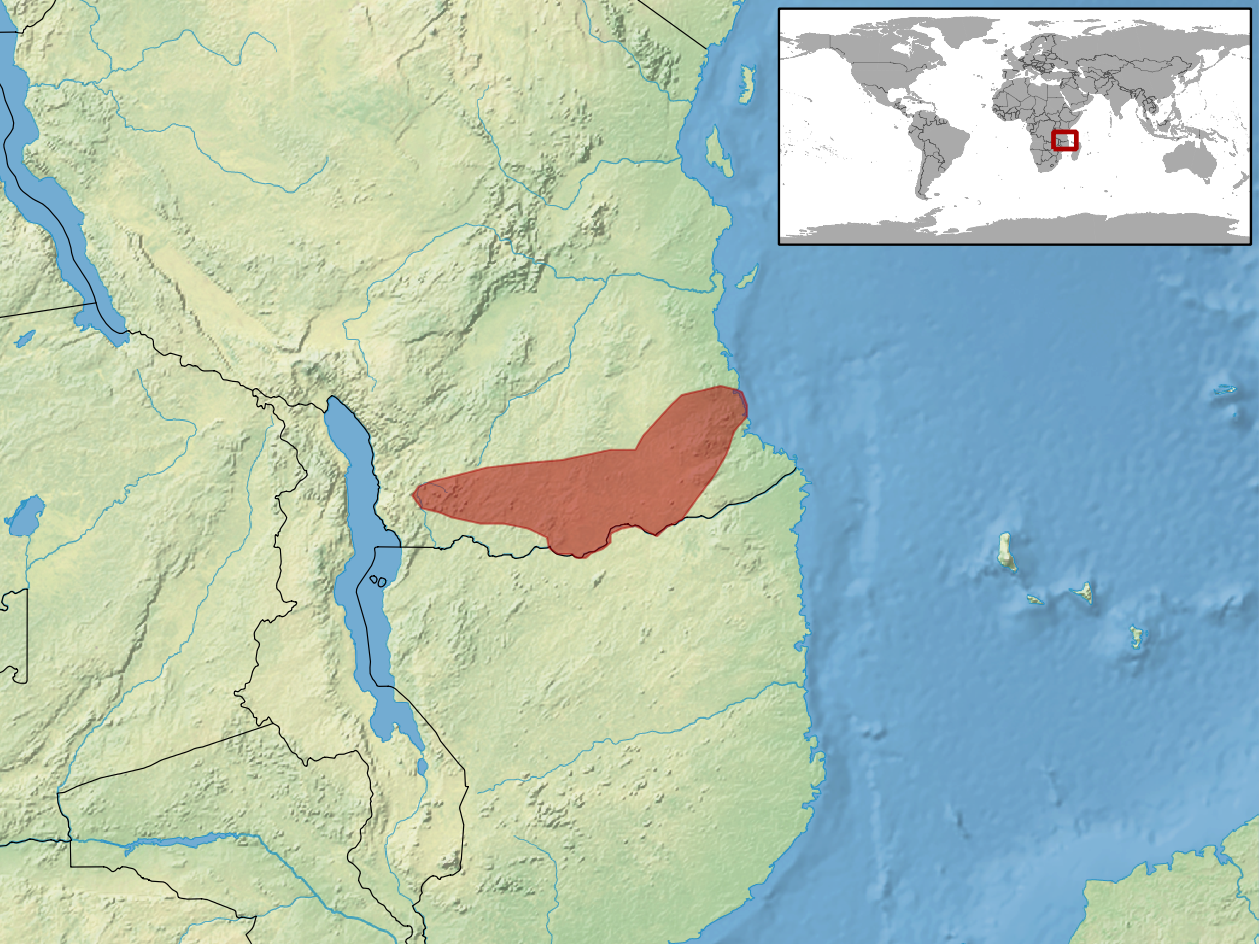

Synonyms
- Amphisbaena ionidesii Battersby, 1950; Loveridgea ionedesii — Broadley & Howell, 1991

Species of lizard

The Liwale round-snouted worm lizard (Loveridgea ionidesii) is a species of amphisbaenian in the family Amphisbaenidae. The species is endemic to Tanzania.

== Etymology ==
The specific name, ionidesii, is in honor of British game warden Constantine John Philip Ionides (1901–1968), who was known as the "Snake Man of British East Africa".

== Habitat ==
The preferred natural habitat of L. ionidesii is savanna, at altitudes from sea level to 1,200 m (3,900 ft).

== Description ==
Medium-sized for an amphisbaenian, L. ionidesii is 8–18 cm (3.1–7.1 in) in snout-to-vent length (SVL).

== Behavior ==
L. ionidesii is diurnal, terrestrial, and fossorial.

== Reproduction ==
L. ionidesii gives birth to live young, and its mode of reproduction has been called viviparous or ovoviviparous. Litter size is two.
