= Coast worm lizard =

Scientific classification
- Kingdom: Animalia
- Phylum: Chordata
- Class: Reptilia
- Order: Squamata
- Clade: Amphisbaenia
- Family: Amphisbaenidae
- Genus: Cynisca
- Species: C. leucura

Binomial name
- Cynisca leucura (Duméril & Bibron, 1839)

Species of lizard

The coast worm lizard (Cynisca leucura) is a worm lizard species in the family Amphisbaenidae. It is found in western Africa. The round, yet narrow, shape of their head is conserved amongst the species and develops as they grow. They all burrow head first and since they do not express sexual dimorphism, all sexes possess a similar appearance and shape.
