= Los Archipelago worm lizard =

Conservation status
- Vulnerable (IUCN 3.1)

Scientific classification
- Kingdom: Animalia
- Phylum: Chordata
- Class: Reptilia
- Order: Squamata
- Clade: Amphisbaenia
- Family: Amphisbaenidae
- Genus: Cynisca
- Species: C. leonina

Binomial name
- Cynisca leonina (Müller, 1885)

Species of lizard

The Los Archipelago worm lizard (Cynisca leonina) is a worm lizard species in the family Amphisbaenidae. It is endemic to Guinea-Bissau and Guinea.
