= Zygaspis maraisi =

Conservation status
- Data Deficient (IUCN 3.1)

Scientific classification
- Kingdom: Animalia
- Phylum: Chordata
- Class: Reptilia
- Order: Squamata
- Clade: Amphisbaenia
- Family: Amphisbaenidae
- Genus: Zygaspis
- Species: Z. maraisi

Binomial name
- Zygaspis maraisi Broadley & Measey, 2016

Species of lizard

Zygaspis maraisi is a worm lizard species in the family Amphisbaenidae. It is endemic to Mozambique.
