= Wedge-snouted worm lizard =

Scientific classification
- Kingdom: Animalia
- Phylum: Chordata
- Class: Reptilia
- Order: Squamata
- Clade: Amphisbaenia
- Family: Amphisbaenidae
- Genus: Geocalamus
- Species: G. acutus

Binomial name
- Geocalamus acutus Sternfeld, 1912

Species of lizard

The wedge-snouted worm lizard (Geocalamus acutus) is a worm lizard species in the family Amphisbaenidae. It is found in Kenya and Tanzania.
