= Zygaspis ferox =

Scientific classification
- Kingdom: Animalia
- Phylum: Chordata
- Class: Reptilia
- Order: Squamata
- Clade: Amphisbaenia
- Family: Amphisbaenidae
- Genus: Zygaspis
- Species: Z. ferox

Binomial name
- Zygaspis ferox Broadley & Broadley, 1997

Species of lizard

Zygaspis ferox is a worm lizard species in the family Amphisbaenidae. It is endemic to Zimbabwe.
