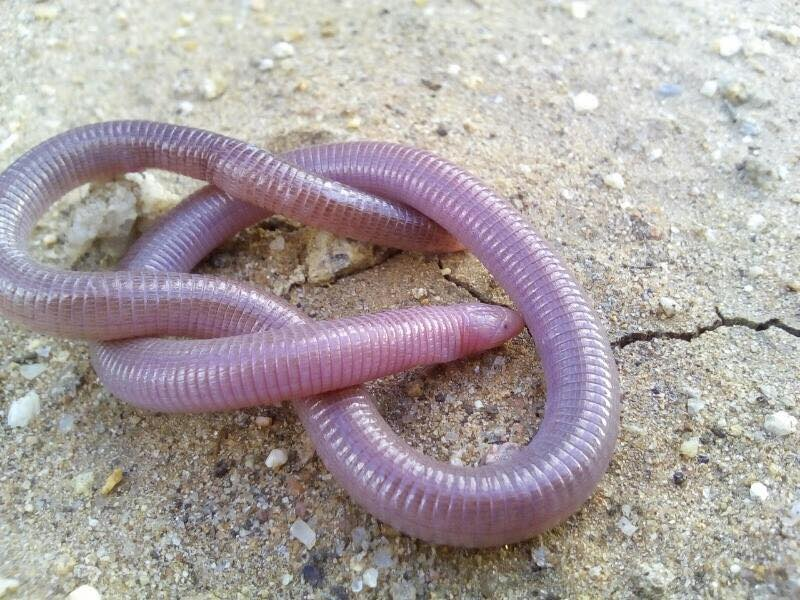
- Zygaspis quadrifrons

Scientific classification
- Kingdom: Animalia
- Phylum: Chordata
- Class: Reptilia
- Order: Squamata
- Clade: Amphisbaenia
- Family: Amphisbaenidae
- Genus: Zygaspis; Cope, 1885

Species
- see text

Synonyms
- Shrevea Vanzolini, 1951

= Zygaspis =

Genus of amphisbaenianss

Zygaspis is a genus of amphisbaenians in the family Amphisbaenidae. Species in the genus are commonly known as purple round-headed worm lizards, and are native to equatorial and southern Africa. The genus contains eight species.

== Species ==
The genus contains eight species:

- Zygaspis dolichomenta de Witte & Laurent, 1942
- Zygaspis ferox D. Broadley & S. Broadley, 1997
- Zygaspis kafuensis D. Broadley & S. Broadley, 1997
- Zygaspis maraisi D. Broadley & Measey, 2016
- Zygaspis nigra D. Broadley & Gans, 1969
- Zygaspis quadrifrons (W. Peters, 1862) – Kalahari round-snouted worm lizard, Kalahari dwarf worm lizard
- Zygaspis vandami (V. Fitzsimons, 1930) – Van Dam's dwarf worm lizard
- Zygaspis violacea (W. Peters, 1854)

Nota bene: A binomial authority in parentheses indicates that the species was originally described in a genus other than Zygaspis.
