= Mbanja worm lizard =

Conservation status
- Least Concern (IUCN 3.1)

Scientific classification
- Kingdom: Animalia
- Phylum: Chordata
- Class: Reptilia
- Order: Squamata
- Clade: Amphisbaenia
- Family: Amphisbaenidae
- Genus: Chirindia
- Species: C. ewerbecki

Binomial name
- Chirindia ewerbecki F. Werner, 1910

Species of amphisbaenian

The Mbanja worm lizard (Chirindia ewerbecki), also known commonly as Ewerbeck's round-headed worm lizard, is a species of amphisbaenian in the family Amphisbaenidae. The species is endemic to Tanzania. There are two recognized subspecies.

== Etymology ==
The specific name, ewerbecki, is in honor of German customs official Karl Ewerbeck, who collected the holotype.

== Geographic range ==
C. ewerbecki is found in extreme southeastern Tanzania.

== Habitat ==
The preferred natural habitat of C. ewerbecki is savanna, at an altitude of about 300 m (980 ft).

== Reproduction ==
C. ewerbecki is oviparous. The adult female lays a single egg.

== Subspecies ==
Two subspecies are recognized as being valid, including the nominotypical subspecies.

- Chirindia ewerbecki ewerbecki F. Werner, 1910
- Chirindia ewerbecki nanguruwensis (Loveridge, 1962)

Nota bene: A trinomial authority in parentheses indicates that the subspecies was originally described in a genus other than Chirindia.
