= Cassine River worm lizard =

Conservation status
- Endangered (IUCN 3.1)

Scientific classification
- Kingdom: Animalia
- Phylum: Chordata
- Class: Reptilia
- Order: Squamata
- Clade: Amphisbaenia
- Family: Amphisbaenidae
- Genus: Cynisca
- Species: C. oligopholis

Binomial name
- Cynisca oligopholis (Boulenger, 1906)

Species of lizard

The Cassine River worm lizard (Cynisca oligopholis) is a worm lizard species in the family Amphisbaenidae. It is found in Guinea-Bissau and Guinea.
