= Listromycter =

Listromycter Temporal range: Early Miocene, 23.03–15.97 Ma

Scientific classification
- Kingdom: Animalia
- Phylum: Chordata
- Class: Reptilia
- Order: Squamata
- Clade: Amphisbaenia
- Family: Amphisbaenidae
- Genus: †Listromycter; Charig and Gans, 1990

Type species
- † Listromycter leakeyi Charig and Gans, 1990

Extinct genus of lizards

Listromycter is an extinct genus of worm lizard from the Early Miocene of Kenya, Africa. It had a skull 36 mm (1.4 in) in size, the largest known for an amphisbaenian.
