= Cynisca kigomensis =

Conservation status
- Critically Endangered (IUCN 3.1)

Scientific classification
- Kingdom: Animalia
- Phylum: Chordata
- Class: Reptilia
- Order: Squamata
- Clade: Amphisbaenia
- Family: Amphisbaenidae
- Genus: Cynisca
- Species: C. kigomensis

Binomial name
- Cynisca kigomensis Dunger, 1968

Species of lizard

Cynisca kigomensis is a worm lizard species in the family Amphisbaenidae. It is endemic to Nigeria.
