= Amphisbaena carli =

Conservation status
- Least Concern (IUCN 3.1)

Scientific classification
- Kingdom: Animalia
- Phylum: Chordata
- Class: Reptilia
- Order: Squamata
- Clade: Amphisbaenia
- Family: Amphisbaenidae
- Genus: Amphisbaena
- Species: A. carli

Binomial name
- Amphisbaena carli Pinna, Mendonça, Bocchiglieri & Fernandes, 2010

Species of amphisbaenian

Amphisbaena carli is a species of amphisbaenian in the family Amphisbaenidae. The species is endemic to Brazil.

== Etymology ==
The specific name, carli, is in honor of American herpetologist Carl Gans.

== Geographic range ==
A. carli has been found in the Brazilian states of Bahia and Piauí.

== Habitat ==
The preferred habitat of A. carli is savanna. The holotype was collected in an area that had been recently deforested and replanted with pines.

== Description ==
A. carli is uniformly pink, both dorsally and ventrally. It may attain a total length (including tail) of 264 mm (10.4 in).

== Behavior ==
A. carli is fossorial.
