= Mesobaena =

Scientific classification
- Kingdom: Animalia
- Phylum: Chordata
- Class: Reptilia
- Order: Squamata
- Clade: Amphisbaenia
- Family: Amphisbaenidae
- Genus: Mesobaena; Mertens, 1925

Species
- Two, see text.

Genus of amphisbaenians

Mesobaena is a genus of amphisbaenians in the family Amphisbaenidae, commonly known as worm lizards. The genus is endemic to South America.

== Species ==
Two species are placed in this genus.

- Mesobaena huebneri Mertens, 1925 – Inirida worm lizard
- Mesobaena rhachicephala Hoogmoed, Pinto, Rocha & Pereira, 2009
