= Cyperus natalensis =

Scientific classification
- Kingdom: Plantae
- Clade: Tracheophytes
- Clade: Angiosperms
- Clade: Monocots
- Clade: Commelinids
- Order: Poales
- Family: Cyperaceae
- Genus: Cyperus
- Species: C. natalensis

Binomial name
- Cyperus natalensis Hochst. ex C.Krauss, 1845

Species of sedge

Cyperus natalensis is a species of sedge that is native to Mozambique and South Africa's KwaZulu-Natal province in southeastern Africa.

== See also ==
- List of Cyperus species
