= West African worm lizard =

Conservation status
- Data Deficient (IUCN 3.1)

Scientific classification
- Kingdom: Animalia
- Phylum: Chordata
- Order: Squamata
- Clade: Amphisbaenia
- Family: Amphisbaenidae
- Genus: Baikia; Gray, 1865
- Species: B. africana

Binomial name
- Baikia africana Gray, 1845

Species of amphisbaenian

The West African worm lizard (Baikia africana) is a species of amphisbaenian in the family Amphisbaenidae. The species is endemic to Nigeria.

== Taxonomy ==
B. africana is the only species in the genus Baikia.
