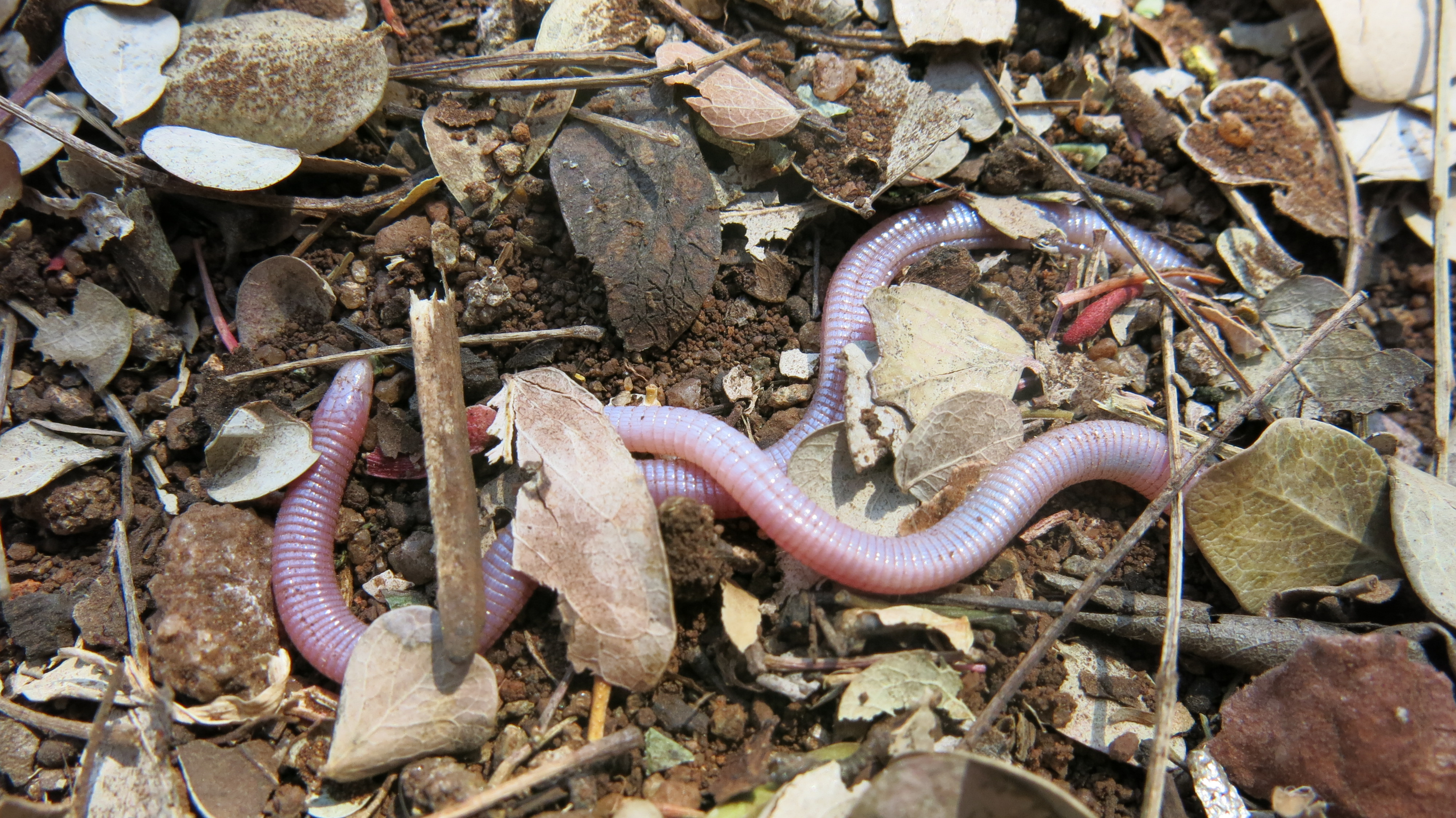
- Soutpansberg worm lizard, Chirindia langi occidentalis

Scientific classification
- Kingdom: Animalia
- Phylum: Chordata
- Class: Reptilia
- Order: Squamata
- Clade: Amphisbaenia
- Family: Amphisbaenidae
- Genus: Chirindia; Boulenger, 1907

Species
- see text

Synonyms
- Amphisbaenula Sternfeld, 1911

= Chirindia =

Genus of amphisbaenians

Chirindia is a genus of amphisbaenians in the family Amphisbaenidae. Commonly known as pink round-headed worm lizards, species in the genus Chirindia are native to East Africa and southern Africa, from Tanzania to South Africa. They are unpigmented worm lizards with rounded heads, and extensive fusion of the head shields.

== Description ==
Chirindia are small and slender. For example, the holotype of C. swynnertoni is 13.5 cm (5.3 in) long, with the tail 1.4 cm (0.55 in), and the body is 3 mm (0.12 in) in diameter. They are uniformly, unpigmented flesh-coloured, tinged with purplish, and have minute teeth. They usually lack an ocular shield, and each eye is situated under the posterior part of a large fused shield, that combines the nasal, second and sometimes first upper labial, prefrontal and sometimes the ocular shield into one, so as to cover all of one side of the snout.

The pair of large shields, fused with the ocular to cover each side of the snout, combined with a small azygous rostral shield, are comparable to that of genus Placogaster of the Senegambia, but the paired ventral shields, and absence of pre-anal pores in some species distinguish them.

== Behaviour and predators ==
Species in the genus Chirindia burrow in loose soil and feed on termites. They are present in clay, sandy or alluvial soils, and sometimes find refuge under stones and rotten logs. They are preyed on by jackals, ratels, kingfishers and snakes, of which some, like the dwarf wolf snake (Lycophidion nanum), are specialized to prey on them.

== Species and subspecies ==
The genus Chirindia contains five valid species, some of which have recognized subspecies.

- Chirindia ewerbecki F. Werner, 1910 – Mbanja worm lizard
  - Chirindia ewerbecki ewerbecki F. Werner, 1910
  - Chirindia ewerbecki nanguruwensis (Loveridge, 1962)
- Chirindia langi V. FitzSimons, 1939 – Lang's worm lizard
  - Chirindia langi langi V. FitzSimons, 1939
  - Chirindia langi occidentalis Jacobsen, 1984 – Soutpansberg worm lizard
- Chirindia mpwapwaensis (Loveridge, 1932) – Mpwapwa worm lizard
- Chirindia rondoensis (Loveridge, 1941) – Nchingidi worm lizard
- Chirindia swynnertoni Boulenger, 1907 – Swynnerton's worm lizard

Nota bene: A binomial authority or trinomial authority in parentheses indicates that the species or subspecies was originally described in a genus other than Chirindia.
