= Loveridgea =

Scientific classification
- Kingdom: Animalia
- Phylum: Chordata
- Class: Reptilia
- Order: Squamata
- Clade: Amphisbaenia
- Family: Amphisbaenidae
- Genus: Loveridgea; Vanzolini, 1951

Species
- Two, see text.

Genus of amphisbaenians

Loveridgea is a genus of amphisbaenians in the family Amphisbaenidae. Species in the genus are commonly known as worm lizards, even though they are not lizards. Two species are placed in this genus.

== Etymology ==
The generic name, Loveridgea, is in honor of British herpetologist Arthur Loveridge.

== Species ==
- Loveridgea ionidesii (Battersby, 1950) – Liwale round-snouted worm lizard
- Loveridgea phylofiniens (Tornier, 1899) – Udjiji worm lizard

Nota bene: A binomial authority in parentheses indicates that the species was originally described in a genus other than Loveridgea.
