= Laurent Chirio =

French–Italian biologist and herpetologist

Laurent Vincent Chirio
- Born: 3 November 1957 (age 68); Marseille, France
- Education: University of Orléans; École pratique des hautes études
- Known for: Research on African reptiles, amphibians, and killifish; biogeography and systematics of African reptiles
- Awards: Ordre des Palmes Académiques (Knight)
- Scientific career
- Fields: Herpetology, Biology
- Workplaces: Muséum national d’histoire naturelle Agence pour l’enseignement français à l’étranger (AEFE)

Laurent Vincent Chirio (born 3 November 1957) is a French–Italian biologist and herpetologist. His research focuses on the biogeography, ecology and systematics of African reptiles and amphibians.

== Biography ==
Chirio earned a Diplôme d’études universitaires générales (DEUG) in biology from the University of Orléans in 1977. In June 1979, he received his master’s degree in animal biology, followed by a master’s degree in natural sciences in June 1980, both from the same university.

In July 1980, he obtained the teaching certificate Certificat d’aptitude au professorat de l’enseignement du second degré (CAPES), and in July 1981 he passed the agrégation in natural sciences. From 1981 to 1986, he taught natural sciences at various schools, including Lycée Xavier Marmier Pontarlier, Collège de Mouthe, Collège Jules Ferry d’Épinal, and Lycée Lakhdar el Bah in Khenchela, Algeria.

In September 1995, Chirio completed his Ph.D. dissertation titled Biogeography of the Reptiles of the Aurès Massif (Algeria) at the École pratique des hautes études. Since August 1997, he has been an associate researcher at the Muséum national d’histoire naturelle, and from July to December 2017, he participated in a project on the inventory of reptiles, amphibians, and killifish in the Ogooué River region of Gabon.

Since 2004, he has served on the educational advisory board of the Agence pour l’enseignement français à l’étranger (AEFE). From 2011 to 2014, he worked as a herpetologist for the environmental consulting firm Terre Environnement Aménagement (TEREA), focusing on inventories of reptiles, amphibians, and killifish in African tropical rainforests. From 2013 to 2014, he was an environmental consultant with the firm SYLVATROP, conducting wildlife surveys in Guinea.

His research interests include the evolutionary biogeography and ecology of African reptile populations, systematics and evolution of African reptiles, treatment of snakebite envenomation, traditional African herbal medicine for snakebite, conservation of African reptiles, and the evolutionary biogeography and population ecology of African amphibians and killifish.

Chirio has been a member of the Société herpétologique de France since 1971. In 1999, he was appointed a Knight of the Ordre des Palmes Académiques for his contributions to education and science.

In 2011 and 2012, Chirio co-authored two reference works, Atlas des reptiles du Cameroun and Lézards, crocodiles et tortues d’Afrique occidentale et du Sahara, both published by the Institut de recherche pour le développement (IRD).

== Eponyms ==
Several species have been named in his honor:

- The toad Wolterstorffina chirioi (Cameroon, 2001)
- The orchid hybrid Aerangis × chirioana (Cameroon, 2002)
- The killifish Pronothobranchius chirioi (Burkina Faso, 2013)
- The amphisbaenian Cynisca chirioi (2014)

== Species described ==
Chirio has been involved in the description of numerous reptiles, fishes, and amphibians since 1991, including:

- Aphyosemion aurantiacum, 2018
- Aphyosemion barakoniense, 2018
- Aphyosemion flavocyaneum, 2018
- Aphyosemion flammulatum, 2018
- Aphyosemion pusillum, 2018
- Aphyosemion rubrogaster, 2018
- Atractaspis branchi, 2019
- Cnemaspis alantika, 2006
- Hemidactylus kundaensis, 2012
- Hemidactylus makolowodei, 2006
- Leptosiaphos koutoui, 2004
- Myriopholis occipitalis, 2019
- Trachylepis makolowodei, 2008
- Trachylepis mekuana, 2000
- Trachylepis nganghae, 2004
- Trachylepis pendeana, 2000
- Naja guineensis, 2018
- Naja savannula, 2018
- Naja senegalensis, 2009
- Rhamphiophis maradiensis, 1991
