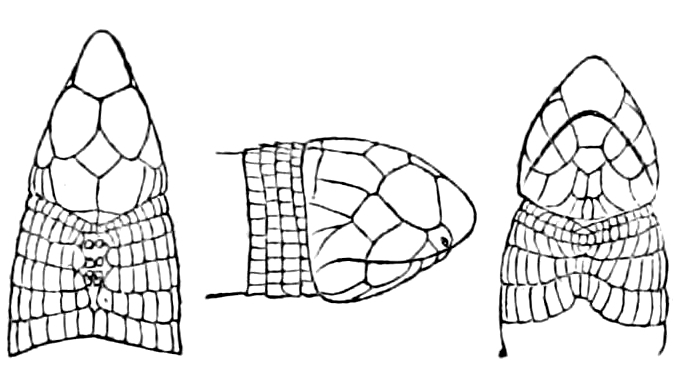
- Geocalamus modestus

Scientific classification
- Kingdom: Animalia
- Phylum: Chordata
- Class: Reptilia
- Order: Squamata
- Clade: Amphisbaenia
- Family: Amphisbaenidae
- Genus: Geocalamus; Günther, 1880

Species
- Two, see text.

= Geocalamus =

Genus of amphisbaenians

Geocalamus is a genus of amphisbaenians in the family Amphisbaenidae. Species in the genus are commonly known as worm lizards. Two species are placed in this genus, both of them endemic to East Africa.

== Species ==
The following species are recognized as being valid.

- Geocalamus acutus Sternfeld, 1912 – wedge-snouted worm lizard (Kenya, Tanzania)
- Geocalamus modestus Günther, 1880 – Mpwapwa wedge-snouted worm lizard (Tanzania)
