= Cyperus vestitus =

Scientific classification
- Kingdom: Plantae
- Clade: Tracheophytes
- Clade: Angiosperms
- Clade: Monocots
- Clade: Commelinids
- Order: Poales
- Family: Cyperaceae
- Genus: Cyperus
- Species: C. vestitus

Binomial name
- Cyperus vestitus Hochst. ex C.Krauss, 1845

Synonyms
- Cyperus obsoletenervosus Peter & Kük. (1936); Cyperus pseudocallistus Kük. (1925); Cyperus vestitus var. pseudocallistus (Kük.) Kük. (1936); Mariscus binucifer C.B.Clarke (1908); Mariscus obsoletenervosus (Peter & Kük.) Greenway (1969); Mariscus vestitus (Hochst. ex C.Krauss) C.B.Clarke (1894)

Species of sedge

Cyperus vestitus is a species of sedge that is native to eastern and southern Africa, ranging from Somalia to the Northern Provinces and KwaZulu-Natal in South Africa.

== See also ==
- List of Cyperus species
