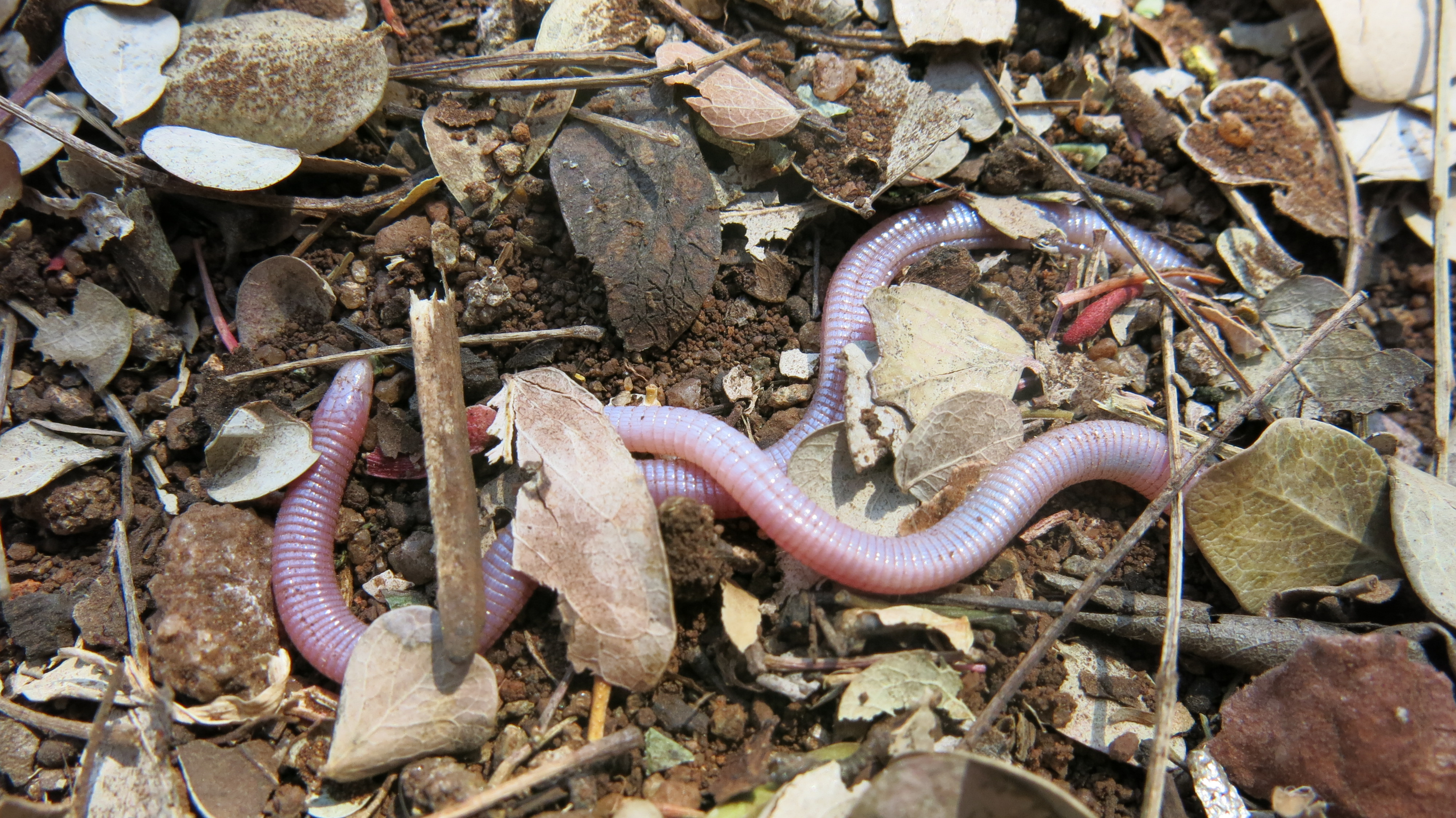
- Soutpansberg worm lizard (Chirindia langi occidentalis)

Conservation status
- Least Concern (IUCN 3.1)

Scientific classification
- Kingdom: Animalia
- Phylum: Chordata
- Class: Reptilia
- Order: Squamata
- Clade: Amphisbaenia
- Family: Amphisbaenidae
- Genus: Chirindia
- Species: C. langi

Binomial name
- Chirindia langi V. FitzSimons, 1939

Synonyms
- Amphisbaena langi (V. FitzSimons, 1939)

= Lang's worm lizard =

Species of amphisbaenian

Lang's worm lizard (Chirindia langi) is a species of amphisbaenian in the family Amphisbaenidae. The species is native to Southern Africa. There are two recognized subspecies.

== Etymology ==
The specific name, langi, is in honor of German taxidermist Herbert Lang.

== Geographic range ==
C. langi is found in Mozambique, South Africa, and Zimbabwe.

== Habitat ==
The preferred natural habitat of C. langi is savanna, at altitudes of 230–1,400 m (750–4,590 ft).

== Description ==
Adults of C. langi usually have a snout-to-vent length (SVL) of 12–14 cm (4.7–5.5 in). The maximum recorded SVL is 15.8 cm (6.2 in). It is slender, and its coloration is uniformly pink.

== Reproduction ==
C. langi is oviparous.

== Subspecies ==
Two subspecies are recognized as being valid, including the nominotypical subspecies.

- Chirindia langi langi V. FitzSimons, 1939
- Chirindia langi occidentalis Jacobsen, 1984
