= Cyrtodactylus gansi =

Conservation status
- Least Concern (IUCN 3.1)

Scientific classification
- Kingdom: Animalia
- Phylum: Chordata
- Class: Reptilia
- Order: Squamata
- Suborder: Gekkota
- Family: Gekkonidae
- Genus: Cyrtodactylus
- Species: C. gansi

Binomial name
- Cyrtodactylus gansi Bauer, 2003

Species of lizard

Cyrtodactylus gansi is a species of gecko, a lizard in the family Gekkonidae. The species is endemic to Myanmar.

== Etymology ==
The specific name, gansi, is in honor of American herpetologist Carl Gans (1923–2009).

== Geographic range ==
C. gansi is found in Chin State, Myanmar.

== Habitat ==
The preferred natural habitats of C. gansi are forest and freshwater wetlands.

== Description ==
Medium-sized for its genus, C. gansi may attain a snout-to-vent length of 6.3 cm (2.5 in).

== Reproduction ==
C. gansi is oviparous.
