= Hemidactylus makolowodei =

Conservation status
- Endangered (IUCN 3.1)

Scientific classification
- Kingdom: Animalia
- Phylum: Chordata
- Class: Reptilia
- Order: Squamata
- Suborder: Gekkota
- Family: Gekkonidae
- Genus: Hemidactylus
- Species: H. makolowodei

Binomial name
- Hemidactylus makolowodei Bauer, Lebreton, Chirio, Ineich & Talla Kouete, 2006

Species of lizard

Hemidactylus makolowodei is a species of African gecko, a lizard in the family Gekkonidae.

== Etymology ==
The specific name, makolowodei, is in honor of Central African herpetologist Paul Makolowode.

== Geographic range ==
As of 2018, Hemidactylus makolowodei is endemic to Cameroon, although its range is likely to extend into Nigeria.

== Habitat ==
The preferred habitats of Hemidactylus makolowodei are forest and savanna, at altitudes of 300–500 m (980–1,640 ft).

== Description ==
Hemidactylus makolowodei is a large gecko, with a snout-to-vent length (SVL) of 10 cm (3.9 in). Dorsally, it is purplish. The male has 45 precloacal-femoral pores.

== Diet ==
Hemidactylus makolowodei preys upon arthropods.

== Reproduction ==
Hemidactylus makolowodei is oviparous.
