= Trachylepis mekuana =

Scientific classification
- Domain: Eukaryota
- Kingdom: Animalia
- Phylum: Chordata
- Class: Reptilia
- Order: Squamata
- Family: Scincidae
- Genus: Trachylepis
- Species: T. mekuana

Binomial name
- Trachylepis mekuana (Chirio & Ineich, 2000)

Species of lizard

Trachylepis mekuana is a species of skink found in Cameroon.
