= Trachylepis nganghae =

Scientific classification
- Domain: Eukaryota
- Kingdom: Animalia
- Phylum: Chordata
- Class: Reptilia
- Order: Squamata
- Family: Scincidae
- Genus: Trachylepis
- Species: T. nganghae

Binomial name
- Trachylepis nganghae Ineich & Chirio, 2004

Species of lizard

Trachylepis nganghae is a species of skink found in Cameroon.
