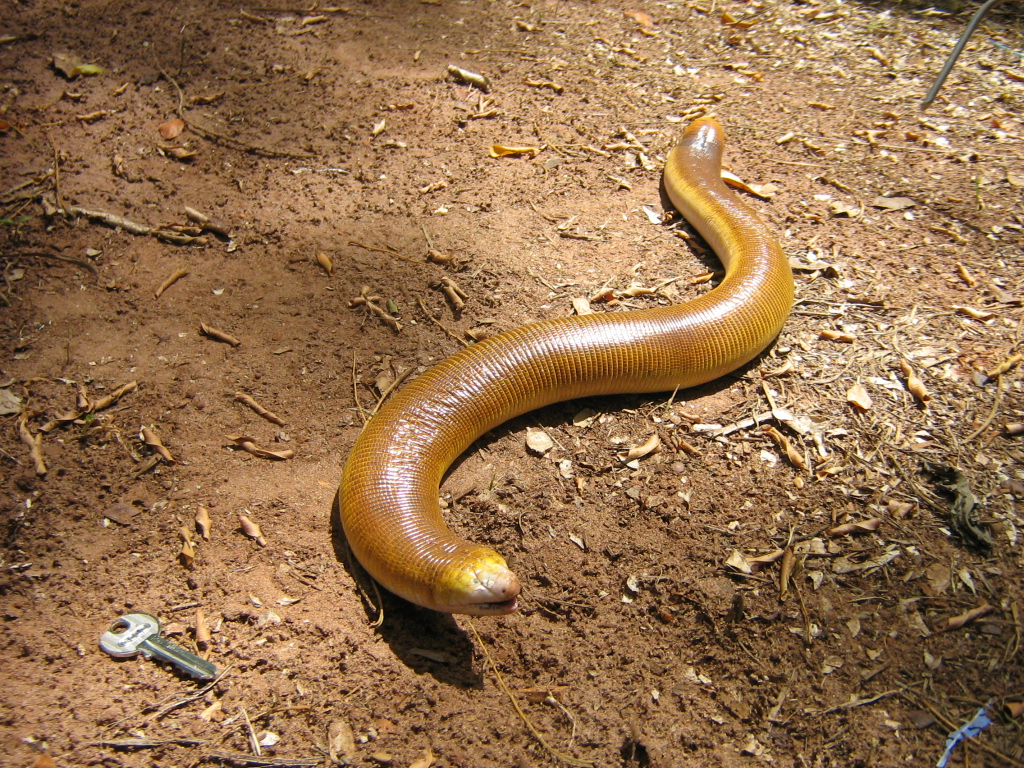

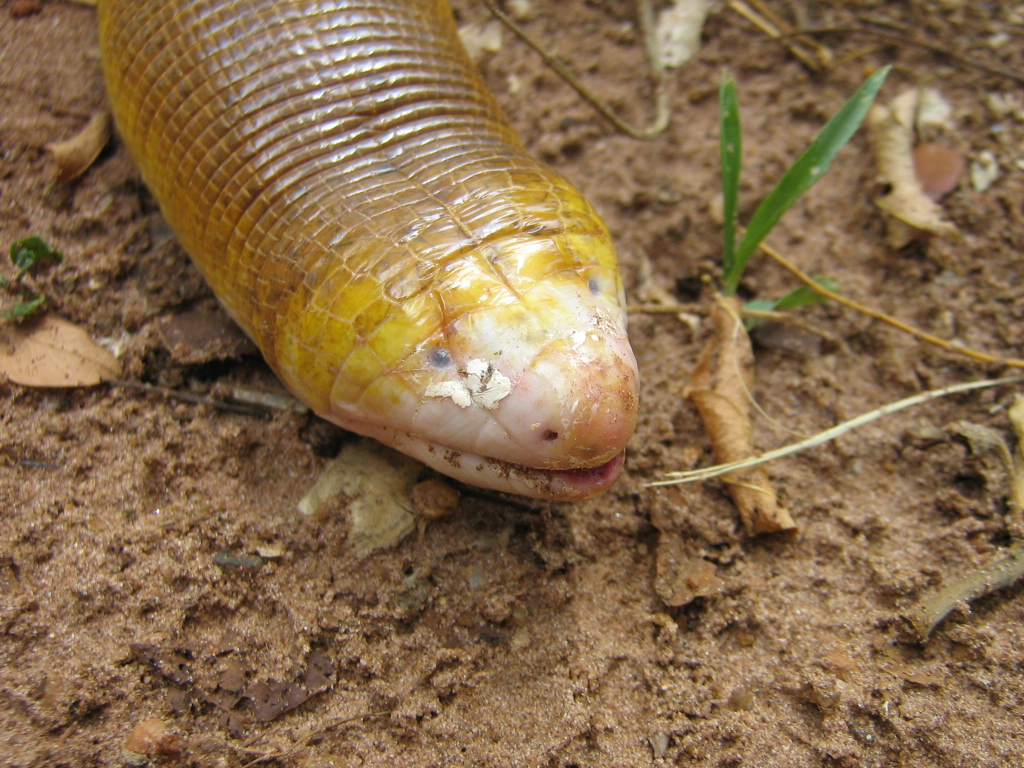

Conservation status
- Least Concern (IUCN 3.1)

Scientific classification
- Kingdom: Animalia
- Phylum: Chordata
- Class: Reptilia
- Order: Squamata
- Suborder: Lacertoidea
- Clade: Amphisbaenia
- Family: Amphisbaenidae
- Genus: Amphisbaena
- Species: A. alba

Binomial name
- Amphisbaena alba Linnaeus, 1758
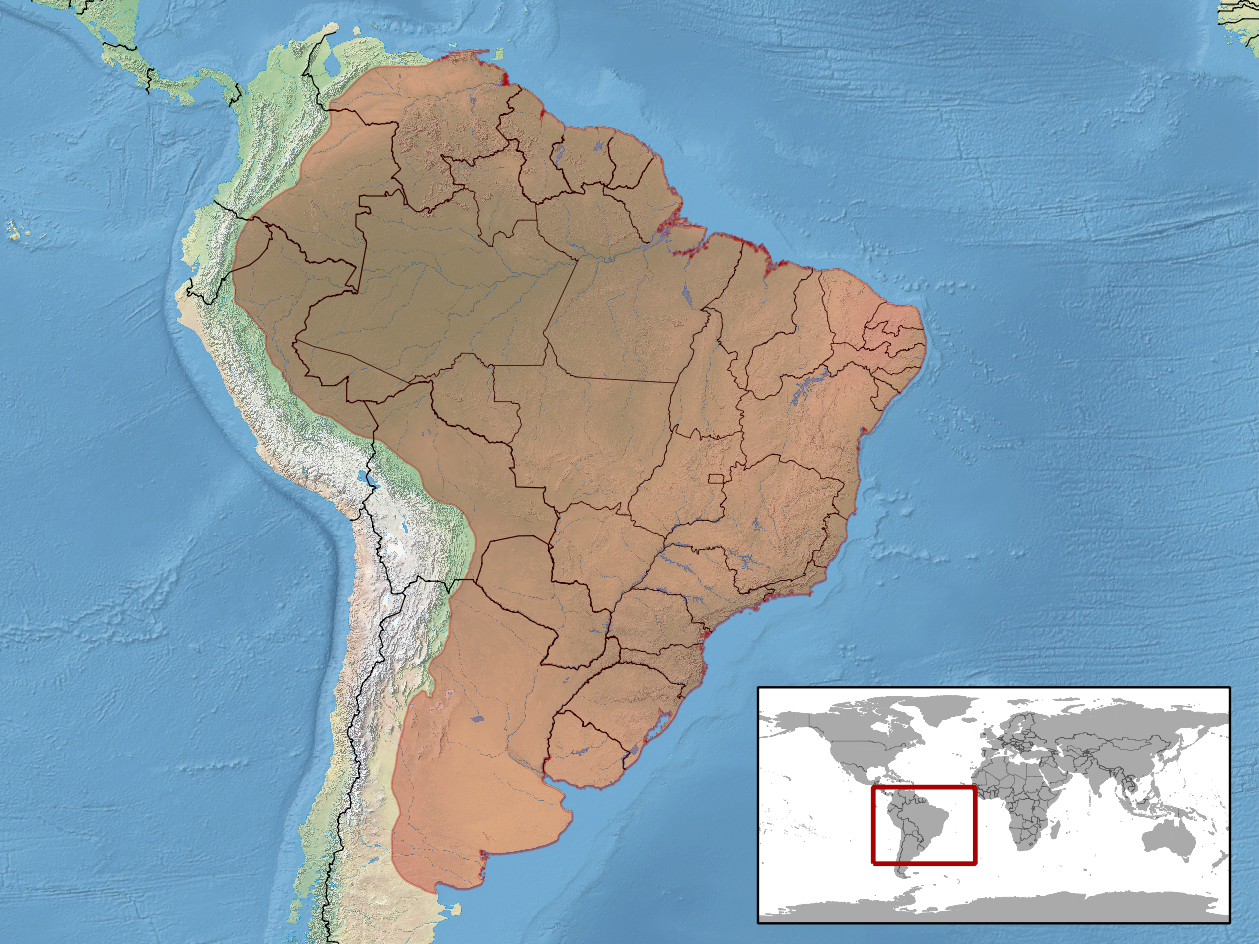
- Range of A. alba (in red) in South America

= Amphisbaena alba =

Species of lizard

Amphisbaena alba, also known as the red worm lizard or less commonly as the white or white-bellied worm lizard, is a species of amphisbaenian in the reptilian order Squamata. Despite the large geographic range that this species covers, little is known about its ecology due to its secretive habits. A. alba has a diverse diet ranging from plant material to small vertebrates (such as lizards and their eggs, snakes, mice, and other rodents). Numerically, beetles, ants, and spiders compose the majority of their diet; however, ants, insect larvae, beetles, cockroaches, hemipterans, mole crickets, crickets, grasshoppers, termites, spiders, scorpions, pseudoscorpions, and annelids are ingested to satisfy a larger volume. The females are somewhat larger than the males, and can reach over 80 cm, which is quite large for an amphisbaenian. They are known to bury themselves in leafcutter ant nests and hide in the ants' garbage dump areas to avoid irritating the ants into attacking, and to bury themselves to avoid predation in general.

== Geographic range ==
It occurs in South America from eastern Venezuela and the island of Trinidad through the entire Amazon Basin to northern Argentina. Amphisbaena alba has the largest geographic range of all the amphisbaenians.

== Reproduction ==
Reproduction for this species occurs in the dry season of its geographical area. Some evidence suggests that this species exploits the living space of the leaf-cutting ant and may even use the nests of these ants to deposit its eggs. A. alba lays the greatest number of eggs at a time (8–16) in comparison to other amphisbaenians, which is possibly due to its large body size. There is no sexual dimorphism in regard to snout-vent length, meristic, or morphometric characters for A. alba most likely due to functional constraints related to their burrowing nature.

The ultrastructure of epididymal spermatozoa has been studied for A. alba. Mature spermatozoa are filiform and are characterized by features such as a depression in the transverse section of the acrosome, a moderately long midpiece, columnar mitochondria, an elongated nucleus, and a fibrous sheath in the midpiece.

Epidermal glands are located in the cloacal region of A. alba and are most likely used for reproduction and marking territory. The openings of the glands are plugged with a solid, holocrine secretion that is removed when it moves through tunnels and leaves a secretion trail.

== Erythrocyte characteristics ==
The stages of ultrastructural changes of organelles in developing erythroid cells are similar to the developmental changes in other vertebrate groups. The greatest difference is the periodical transverse alignment of hemoglobin molecules in the organelle matrix of the hemosomes. The transformation of the erythroid cell organelles for hemoglobin biosynthesis occurs slowly. This is due to the low metabolic rate of A. alba which is a result of the hypoxic environment where it lives.

== Defensive tactics ==
When Amphisbaena alba assumes a defensive posture it bends its body into the shape of a horseshoe and raises both the head and the tail. The tail is made of tough collagen bundles that allows the tail to absorb mechanical pressure from a bite. The body of A. alba is also covered with a flexible armor which makes other areas resistant to bites as well.

== See also ==
- List of reptiles of Brazil
