= Trachylepis pendeana =

Scientific classification
- Domain: Eukaryota
- Kingdom: Animalia
- Phylum: Chordata
- Class: Reptilia
- Order: Squamata
- Family: Scincidae
- Genus: Trachylepis
- Species: T. pendeana

Binomial name
- Trachylepis pendeana Ineich & Chirio, 2000

Species of lizard

Trachylepis pendeana is a species of skink found in Central African Republic.
