= Christian Ferdinand Friedrich Krauss =

German scientist, traveler and collector

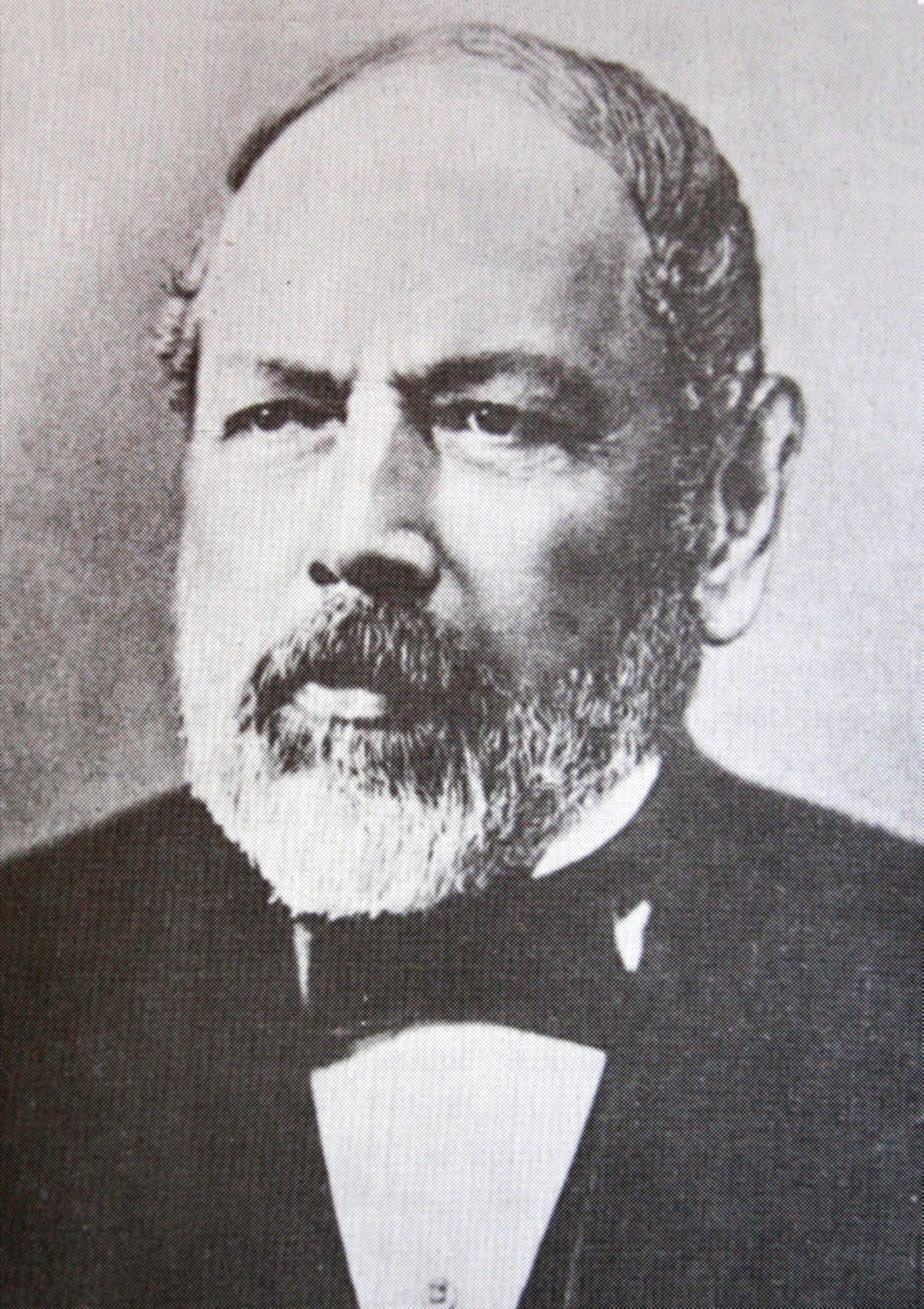

Christian Ferdinand Friedrich Krauss (Stuttgart, 9 July 1812 – 15 September 1890), was a German scientist, traveller and collector.

== Early life ==
He was an apothecary's apprentice and worked as a pharmacist for a while, but then took up the study of mineralogy, zoology and chemistry at Tübingen and Heidelberg, where he excelled academically and was awarded a PhD summa cum laude in 1836.

== South Africa ==
=== Cape Province 7 May 1838 – 2 June 1839 ===
The following year Baron von Ludwig, famous for his garden in Cape Town, visited Germany and persuaded Krauss to visit South Africa. They sailed from Portsmouth aboard the 676-ton barque La Belle Alliance (the same vessel that had carried 1820 Settlers from England to the Eastern Cape) and arrived in Cape Town 81 days later on 7 May 1838. Krauss started collecting and studying the fauna, flora and geology of Cape Town and environs in earnest after a short trip to Tulbagh. He collected molluscs and crustaceans, marine algae and fish. Planning a trip to the interior, he ordered a wagon to be made. He set off with his ox-wagon, 14 oxen, a horse and two assistants, going over Sir Lowry's Pass and the Houhoek Pass to Genadendal. From here he visited Kogmanskloof by horse. Leaving Genadendal he travelled southwards to Caledon, to Walker Bay, Elim, Prinskraal, Cape Agulhas, along Struisbaai to De Hoop and Swellendam. From here he set out eastwards to Mossel Bay and George, spending some time in the extensive forests of the Tsitsikamma. He went on a small side trip from George across the Outeniqua Mountains to Oudtshoorn and the Cango Caves. Going further east from George, he crossed the Kaaimans River, but had to leave his wagon at the Diep River because of a dangerous crossing. Travelling further with Rev. Ballott and staying with Capt. Thomas Henry Duthie (friend of Charles Collier Michell) on the farm Belvidere, before joining George Rex at Melkhout Kraal. From here he touched at Plettenberg Bay and Keurbooms River, and on 19 February 1839 left Knysna to return to his abandoned wagon at Diep River and decided to tackle the difficult Devilskop pass into the Langkloof, where he found that the trip had so exhausted his oxen that they needed to be replaced. Travelling east along the Langkloof, he made an excursion lasting a week on horseback to Toorwater at the point where the Olifants River cuts through the Swartberg, returning over Antoniesberg and the Kouga Mountains and meeting up with his wagon, which had gone ahead, on 1 March. When he reached Jagersbos three days later, he turned south over the Kareedouwberg to the Moravian Mission station at Koksbosch (which is now known as Clarkson) and went on to Driefontein. He spent 3 weeks in this locality, referring to it as Tsitsikamma, before moving across the Gamtoos River and on to Uitenhage where he stayed with the pharmacist and plant collector Joachim Brehm. Here he sold his wagon and oxen to a Dr. John Jones who farmed north of the Groot Winterhoek Mountains. From Uitenhage he made several outings to Swartkops, Bethelsdorp, Port Elizabeth and Cape Recife, visiting the botanist and retired major Friedrich von Buchenröder on the Swartkops River.

While in Port Elizabeth, Krauss heard many reports about Natal that piqued his interest. He determined to go there, but first ventured north into the Karoo. He followed the course of the Coega River to Elandshoorn and ascended the Groot Winterhoekberge. From there he went on to the Gamtoos River, following it to where it breaks through the Groot Winterhoekberge as the Grootrivier, and further north to the Springbokvlakte. At this point grazing was so poor that he returned on 20 May to Dr. Jones' farm in the Groot Winterhoekberge. On 2 June 1839 he sailed from Port Elizabeth to Natal on the "Mazeppa".

=== Natal 2 June 1839 – 5 February 1840 ===
Krauss enjoyed the company of 2 other naturalists for the eight-day voyage to Port Natal - the Swede Wahlberg and the Frenchman Adulphe Delegorgue. The first significant zoological exploration of Natal, with its adjacent territories of Kaffraria to the south and Zululand to the north, can be dated from 1839 with their arrival. Krauss stayed in a reed hut at Congella, going on daily excursions into the bush or along the seashore. He was delighted with the variety of species that he encountered. "I was surprised at the variety and colourfulness of the molluscs left in the little pools and puddles on the rocks after high tide. It was like a flower garden - lovely coloured actiniae and other coelenterata, the variously coloured sea urchins and sea stars, many one- or two-shelled molluscae, and between them bushes of algae, corallinae and zoophytae with great numbers of crabs of all shades disporting themselves, created a splendid picture." Many of his finds he later described in Die südafrikanischen Crustacean (1843) and Die südafrikanischen Mollusken (1848). Krauss next moved on to Pietermaritzburg and collected in the hills around the town before returning to Congella on 17 September. Twelve days later he moved his camp to Umlaas and spent about three weeks there, concentrating his collecting on the mouth of the Umlaas River. At this time he joined a Volksraad deputation under Landdrost Roos, sent to visit the Zulu chief Mpanda at his kraal between the Umdhloti and Umvoti Rivers. On his return Krauss again stayed at Congella. His geological interests sent him on a short excursion to some coalfields near Karkloof and lying between the Bushmans and Blaauwkrantz Rivers. He returned to Pietermaritzburg and delivered a report to the Volksraad. Back at the Umlaas camp on 19 January, he resumed his collecting and made preparations for his departure.

He sailed from Port Natal on 5 February and was back in Cape Town two weeks later.

=== Cape Town 19 February 1840 – 22 April 1840 ===
In Cape Town Baron von Ludwig once again extended his hospitality. Krauss made some short daytrips into the mountains between Table Mountain and Muizenberg, and considered a journey to Namaqualand, but the offer of employment in Stuttgart could not be postponed. With his collections taking up 16 crates, he left Cape Town on 22 April 1840 aboard the "Vernon", a new type of ship sporting an auxiliary engine. Getting back to England, he sold 500 of his plant specimens to the British Museum.

== Germany ==
Back in Stuttgart, Krauss was appointed to the Natural History Museum of which he became director in 1856, partly because of the reputation he acquired from his published works. In 1880 he was honoured with a decoration entitling him to be called Dr. Ferdinand von Krauss. His factual and rather dry accounts provided an accurate record of conditions in the Cape, in particular his description of the Zulus and their way of life has been found most reliable. Some of his collections were worked out and published by Christian Ferdinand Friedrich Hochstetter (1787–1860), Carl Daniel Friedrich Meisner (1800–1874), Bernhardi, Buchinger, Johann Friedrich Klotzsch, Julius von Flotow (1788–1856) and Carl (Karl) Heinrich 'Bipontinus' Schultz (1805–1867). His cryptogams were dealt with by Theodor Ludwig Wilhelm Bischoff, Karl Wilhelm Ludwig Bruch, Hering, Eduard von Martens, Gustav Kunze (1793–1851) and Johann Bernhard Wilhelm Lindenberg (1781–1851). From a summary given in Flora vol. 29 pp. 216–19, Krauss collected 2,308 species (mostly flowering plants) of which 340 species and 34 genera were new to science. Not all were upheld, but many were named for him: Kraussia Harv., Combretum kraussii Hochst., Cussonia kraussii Hochst., Adenandra kraussii Meisn., Vernonia kraussii Sch.Bip., Pavonia kraussiana Hochst., Aspalathus kraussiana Meisn. and many more.

In 1878 a species of African amphisbaenian, Cynisca kraussi, was named in his honor by German herpetologist Wilhelm Peters.

Krauss' specimens are lodged with the British Museum, University of Cambridge, Royal Botanic Garden, Edinburgh, Museo di Storia Naturale di Firenze, Conservatoire et Jardin botaniques de la Ville de Genève, Biozentrum Klein-Flottbek, and many more herbaria.

== See also ==
- List of natural history dealers
