= Carl Gans =

German-born American zoologist and herpetologist

Carl Gans (7 September 1923 – 30 November 2009) was a German-born American zoologist and herpetologist. He and Glen Northcutt proposed the provocative theory of "new head theory", opened up evolutionary developmental biology as a new discipline.

== Early life and education ==
Gans, who was Jewish, was born in Germany. While a teenager in 1939, he was able to escape Nazi Germany by fleeing to the United States, where he completed his education. He attended George Washington High School in New York City. In 1944 he earned a BS in Mechanical Engineering at New York University, and in 1950 an MS in Mechanical Engineering at Columbia University. In 1957 he received a PhD in Biology from Harvard University.

== Career ==
From 1947 to 1955 Gans worked as an engineer. From 1957 to 1958 he was a Fellow in Biology at the University of Florida. From 1958 to 1971 he taught biology at the State University of New York, Buffalo. From then on he was Professor of Biology at the University of Michigan. He retired in 1988. In 1997 he moved to Austin (Texas) where he had an adjunct position at The University of Texas. Gans was editor of the Biology of the Reptilia a 23-volume work published from 1969 to 2009.

== Taxa described by Gans ==
Working in the scientific field of herpetology, Gans described 22 new species of reptiles, and 4 new species of amphibians.

== Taxa named in honor of Gans ==
Gans is commemorated in the scientific names of several reptiles: Amphisbaena carlgansi, Amphisbaena carli, Amphisbaena cegei, Cynisca gansi, Cyrtodactylus gansi, Dasypeltis gansi, Eutropis gansi, Lankascincus gansi, and Nessia gansi.
