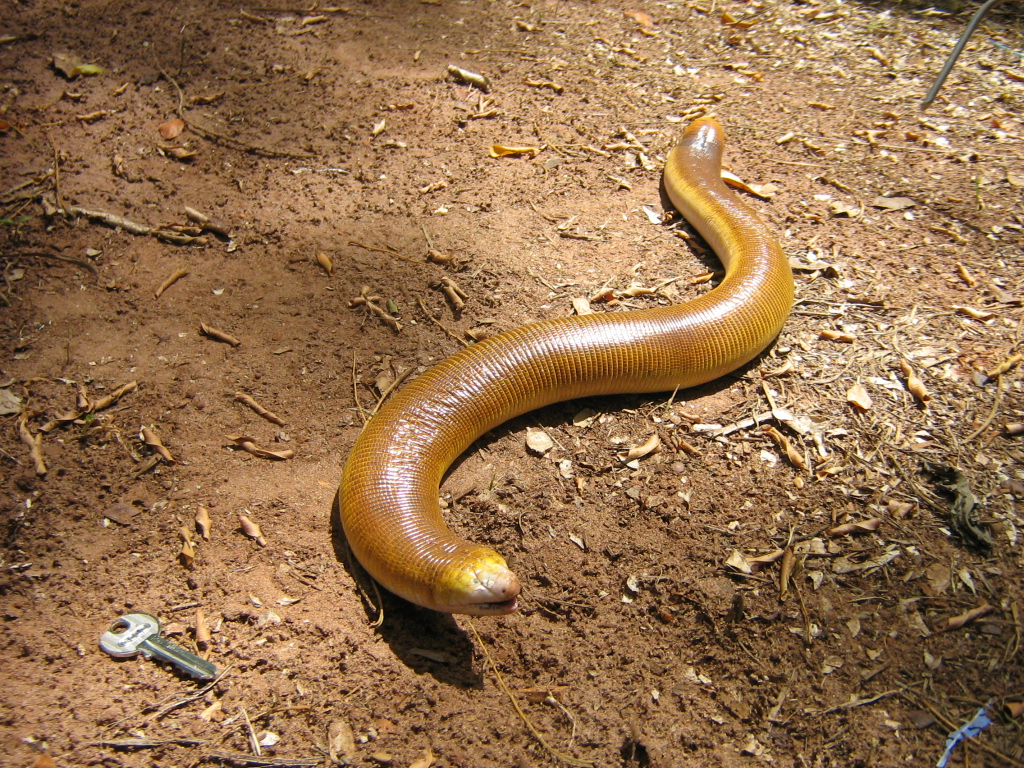
- Amphisbaena alba

Scientific classification
- Kingdom: Animalia
- Phylum: Chordata
- Class: Reptilia
- Order: Squamata
- Clade: Amphisbaenia
- Family: Amphisbaenidae; Gray, 1865

Genera
- 12 extant, see text

= Amphisbaenidae =

Amphisbaenidae Temporal range: Late Cretaceous–present, 66.043–0 Ma

Family of reptiles

The Amphisbaenidae (common name: worm lizards) are a family of amphisbaenians, a group of limbless reptiles. There are 12 genera, containing 183 species.

== Geographic range ==
Amphisbaenids occur in South America, some Caribbean islands, Europe, and sub-Saharan Africa.

== Taxonomy ==
One deep-branching and somewhat aberrant genus, Blanus, is native to Europe, and may represent a distinct family. More recent sources indeed place it in the family Blanidae.

== Description ==
Members of the family Amphisbaenidae are limbless, burrowing reptiles with carnivorous diets. As in other amphisbaenians, the body bears rings of scales, which gives amphisbaenids a worm-like appearance. The head is massively constructed and used for burrowing, with powerful jaws and large, recurved teeth used for seizing prey. Some species have a spade-like head, while others have a narrow keel on the head, and still others have a rounded skull. The eyes are highly reduced, while the ear bone, or stapes in the middle ear, is large and massive. Together with another bone, the extracollumella, the stapes detects vibrations caused by prey items, allowing amphisbaenids to hunt for invertebrates under ground. In this respect, it is an example of convergent evolution to the burrowing mammalian family Chrysochloridae (golden moles), in which the malleus in the middle ear is greatly enlarged.

== Extant genera ==
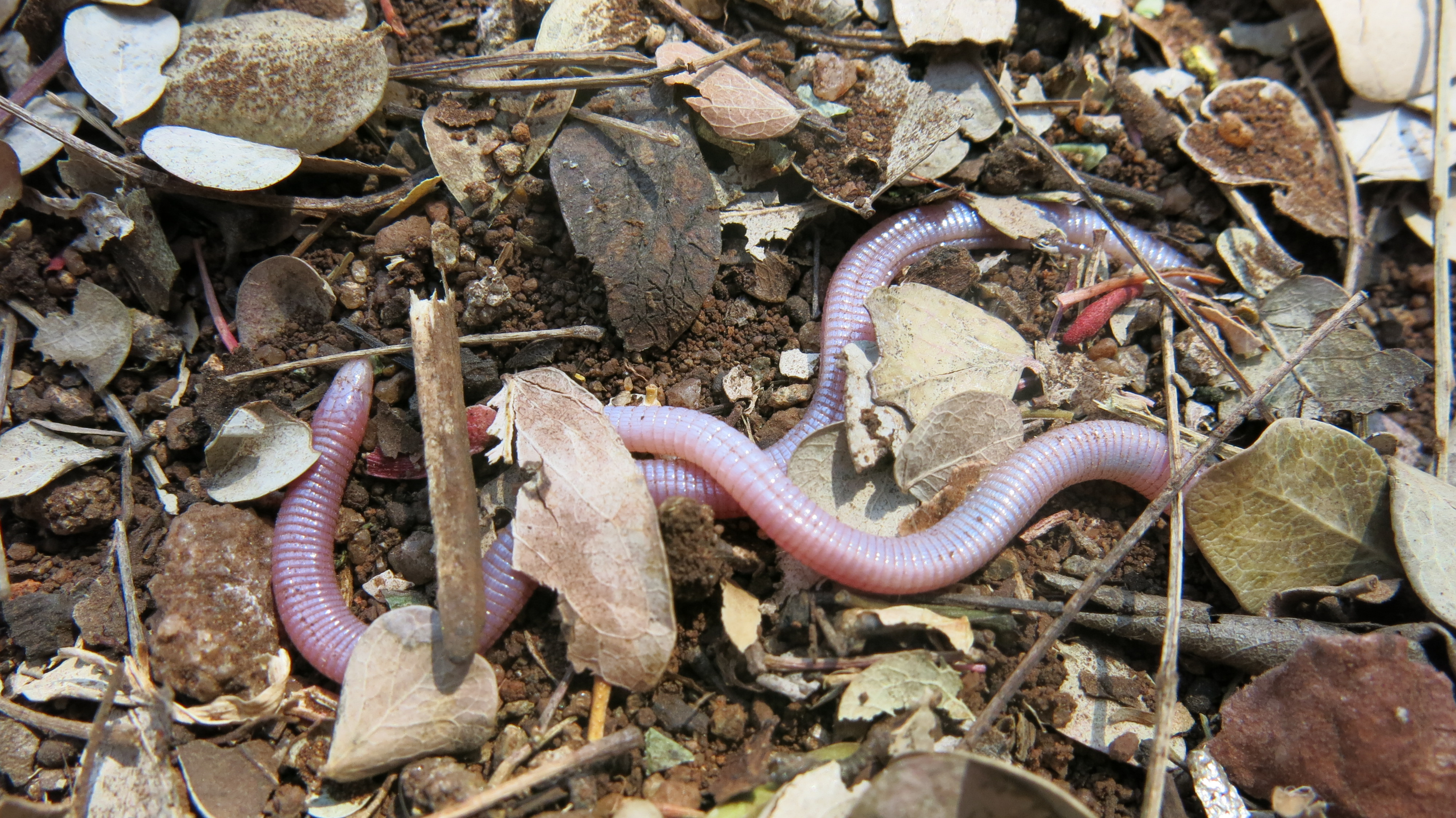
Chirindia langi

183 extant species are in the family, grouped into 12 genera:

- Amphisbaena Linnaeus, 1758
- Ancylocranium Parker, 1942
- Baikia Gray, 1865
- Chirindia Boulenger, 1907
- Cynisca A.M.C. Duméril & Bibron, 1839
- Dalophia Gray, 1865
- Geocalamus Günther, 1880
- Leposternon Wagler, 1824
- Loveridgea Tornier, 1899
- Mesobaena Mertens, 1925
- Monopeltis A. Smith, 1848
- Zygaspis Cope, 1885

== Fossil genera ==
A number of extinct taxa are known from the fossil record:

- †Campinosaurus
- †Listromycter
- †Lophocranion
- †Platyrhachis
