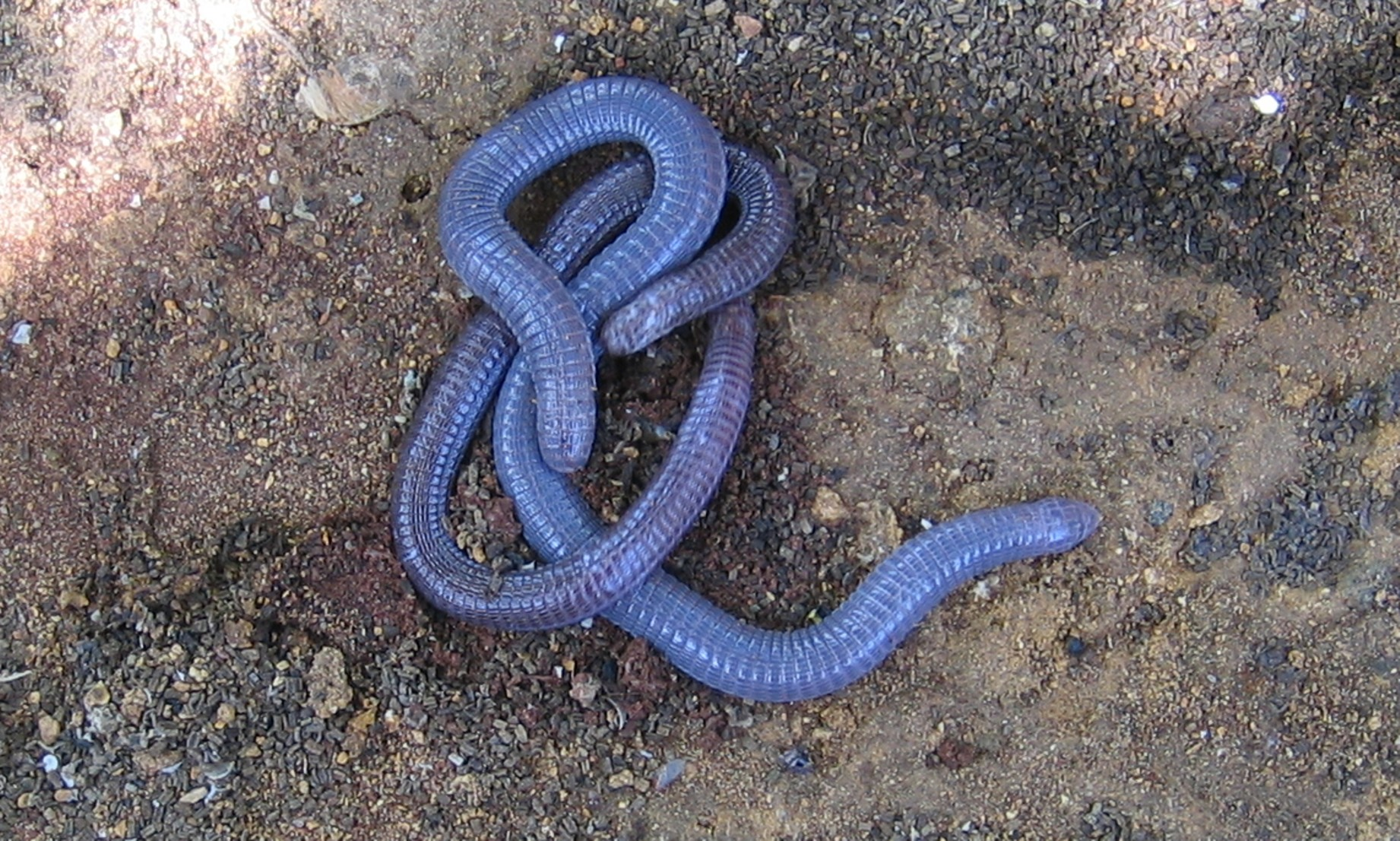
- Blanus cinereus, Spain

Scientific classification
- Kingdom: Animalia
- Phylum: Chordata
- Class: Reptilia
- Order: Squamata
- Clade: Lacertibaenia
- Clade: Amphisbaenia; Gray, 1844

Families
- Amphisbaenidae; Bipedidae; Blanidae; Cadeidae; Rhineuridae; Trogonophidae
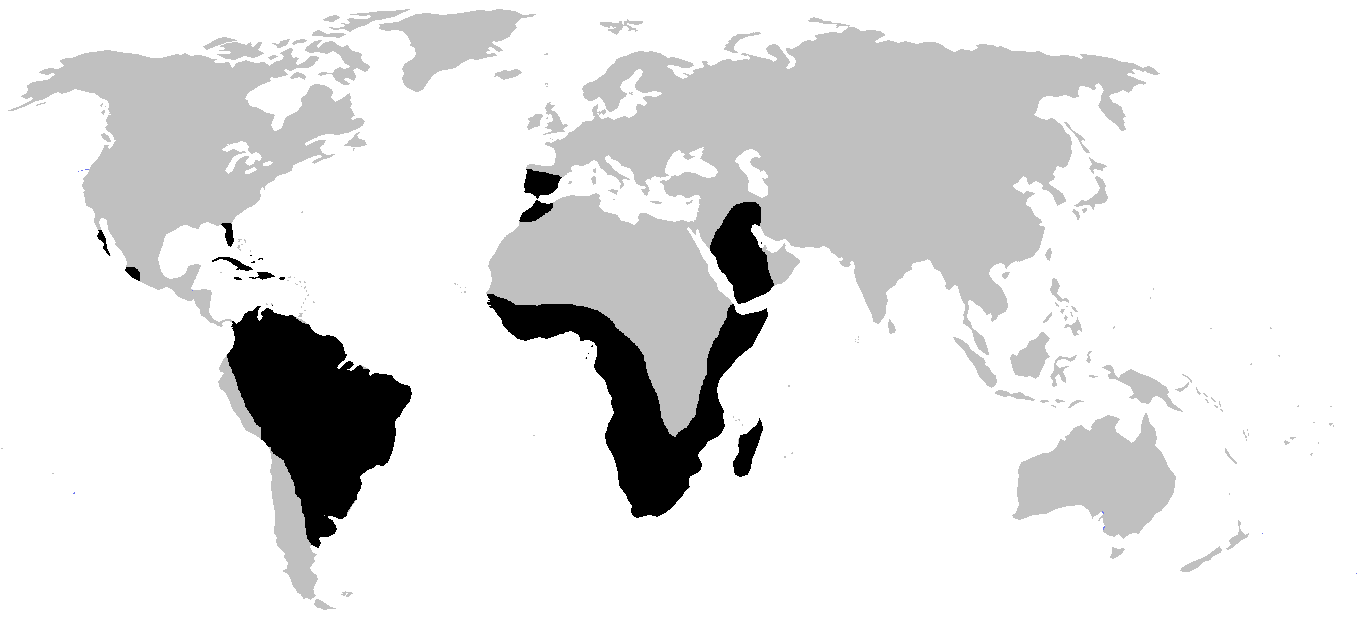
- Black: range of Amphisbaenia

= Amphisbaenia =

Amphisbaenians Temporal range: Paleocene–Present

Clade of reptiles

Amphisbaenia /æmfɪsˈbiːniə/ (called amphisbaenians or worm lizards) is a group of typically legless lizards, comprising over 200 extant species. Amphisbaenians are characterized by their long bodies, the reduction or loss of the limbs, and rudimentary eyes. As many species have a pink body and scales arranged in rings, they have a superficial resemblance to earthworms. While the genus Bipes retains forelimbs, all other genera are limbless. Phylogenetic studies suggest that they are nested within Lacertoidea, closely related to the lizard family Lacertidae. Amphisbaenians are widely distributed, occurring in North America, Europe, Africa, South America, Western Asia and the Caribbean. Most species are less than 6 inches (15 cm) long.

== Description ==
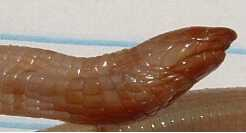
Close-up of the head of Rhineura

Despite a superficial resemblance to some primitive snakes, amphisbaenians have many unique features that distinguish them from other reptiles. Internally, their right lung is reduced in size to fit their narrow bodies, whereas in snakes, it is always the left lung. Their skeletal structure and skin are also different from those of other squamates. Both genetic and recent fossil evidence indicate that amphisbaenians lost their legs independently from snakes.

The head is stout, not set off from the neck, and either rounded, sloped, or sloped with a ridge down the middle. Most of the skull is solid bone, with a distinctive single median tooth in the upper jaw. A unique bone, the tabulosphenoid, forms the anterior floor of the braincase. It has no outer ears, and the eyes are deeply recessed and covered with skin and scales. These rudimentary eyes have a cornea, lens, and complex ciliary body, which allows them to detect light, but they are reduced in size and do not have an anterior chamber. The body is elongated, and the tail truncates in a manner that vaguely resembles the head. At their tail is a single fracture plane for tail autotomy, between the fifth and eighth caudal rings and is often visible due to coloration. The purpose seems to be to distract predators with the tail acting as a decoy. Their name is derived from Amphisbaena, a mythical serpent with a head at each end—referencing both the manner in which their tail truncates, and their ability to move just as well in reverse as forwards. The four species of Bipes are unusual in having a pair of forelimbs. All other species lack any trace of forelimb skeletal elements, and Rhineura floridana also lack any pectoral girdle skeletal element. The other species have some remnants of the pectoral girdle embedded within the body musculature. A remnant of the pelvic girdle is present in all families, and Bipes and the genus Blanus have also retained a reduced femur.

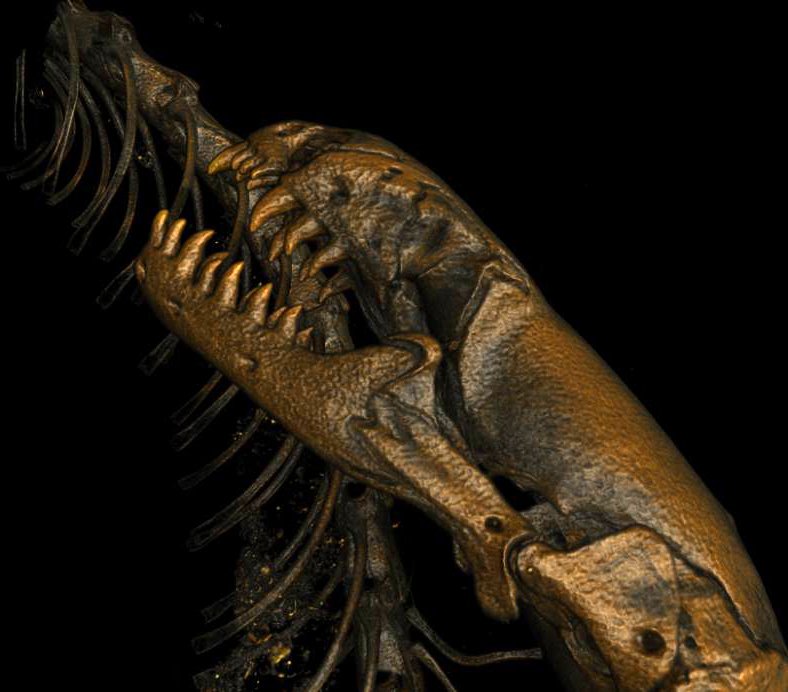
Skull of the amphisbaenian Blanus, showing the large teeth and powerful jaws typical of worm lizards

Amphisbaenians have a distinctive skin made up of rings of scales (annuli) that form a tube in which the loosely attached trunk of the body moves. Burrowing is achieved with an accordion-like motion, with longitudinal muscles in the skin bunching up the annuli, anchoring it to the surrounding soil, and trunk muscles moving the body forward or backwards within the integumentary tube.

Amphisbaenians are carnivorous, able to tear chunks out of larger prey with their powerful, interlocking teeth. Like lizards, some species are able to shed their tails (autotomy). Most species lay eggs, although at least some are known to be viviparous.

The red worm lizard (Amphisbaena alba) is often found in association with leafcutter ants. This reptile is thought to forage in the ants' deep galleries, where the insects deposit their waste. The presence of these reptiles is easily explained by the fact that they prey on the larvae of large beetles that also inhabit the leafcutter ants' galleries.

Amphisbaenians have often been categorized by their skull shape. The specialized skull shape is hypothesized to be driven by environmental and ecological conditions, such as soil type, and is an instance of convergent evolution. Traditionally four types of skulls are recognized; "shovel-headed", "round-headed", "keel-headed", and "spade-headed", although it doesn't say anything about the relationship between the types. Of these four morphotypes, the round-headed species produce the lowest burrowing forces, the shovel-headed species the second lowest forces, the keel-headed species the second highest forces, and the spade-headed the highest forces.

== Distribution ==
Amphisbaenians are found in North America, Europe, Africa, South America, the Middle East, and the Caribbean, a surprisingly large distribution despite being small subterranean animals that rarely ever leave their burrows. Initially, this large distribution was thought to be due to vicariance, or the result of the breakup of Pangaea. This hypothesis was supported by morphological data that dated amphisbaenian diversification to over 200 million years ago (Mya), while Pangaea was still intact. However, a recent study using a combination of molecular and fossil evidence suggests that amphisbaenians originated in North America, where they underwent their first divergence around 107 Mya. They then underwent another major diversification into North American and European forms 40–56 Mya. Finally, the African and South American forms split around 40 Mya. This suggests that worm-lizards crossed the Atlantic Ocean (which had fully formed by 100 Mya) twice, once just after the K–Pg extinction, and then again, later in the Palaeogene. This also implies that limblessness evolved independently three times, a finding that contrasts the morphological theory that limbed amphisbaenians are the most basal. This widespread dispersal is suggested to have occurred by rafting – natural erosion or a storm event loosened a large raft of soil and vegetation that drifted across the ocean until landing on another shore. This oceanic rafting would be feasible due to the subterranean lifestyle and small nutritional requirements of amphisbaenids. After the Chicxulub impact, many predators of amphisbaenians became extinct, which allowed colonist amphisbaenians to thrive in new territories.

== Evolution ==
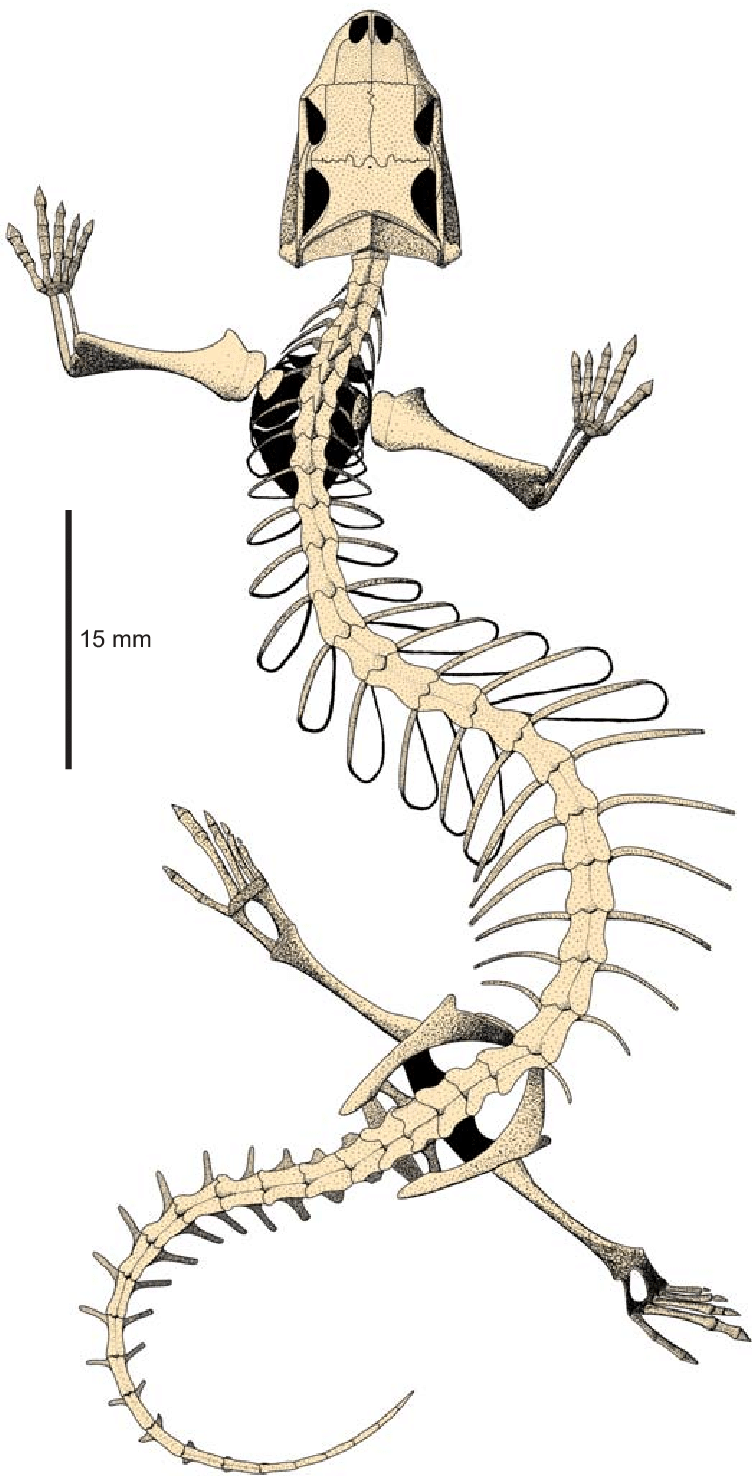
Skeleton of the possible stem-amphisbaenian Slavoia darevskii from the Late Cretaceous of Mongolia

The fully limbed Slavoia darevskii from the Late Cretaceous (Campanian) of Mongolia may represent an early relative of amphisbaenians. The oldest known modern amphisbaenians include members of Rhineuridae and the extinct family Oligodontosauridae from the Paleocene of North America. Modern amphisbaenians likely originated in North America, before dispersing to South America, Africa and Europe via rafting during the Paleogene.

The phylogenetic placement of Amphisbaenia and other limbless clades is historically complex, and musculoskeletal variability within the clade itself has led to much evolutionary confusion. Although many amphisbaenians are limbless, limb retention and developed pelvic structures do exist throughout the clade. The family Bipedidae exhibit fully developed forelimbs, Blanidae and Trogonophidae retain several pectoral girdle elements, and Rhineuridae display a minimal pelvic structure. The widespread variability of these characters has led to long-held evolutionary disputes about the development of limblessness within the clade.

The discovery of a particular Lacertibaenian fossil, Cryptolacerta hassiaca, in Hesse, Germany was a significant finding that provided evidence for a hypothesized amphisbaenian phylogeny. Through parsimony and Baysian analysis, modern Amphisbaenia was proposed as sister taxon to Cryptolacerta, supported by 19 shared characters. In 2016, however, these findings were reevaluated and evidence was reported which supported a specimen of Slavoia darevskii as being most closely related to Amphisbaenia. Through reexamination of morphology with a light microscope and CT scanning, research found that Slavoia displayed two uniquely amphisbaenian characters: (1) the vomer underlapped the palatine and (2) the pterygoid quadrate ramus was small in size and wrapped around the posteromedial surface of the quadrate. Neither of these were characters shared by Cryptolacerta.

The morphological and molecular study and published evaluation of legless origins in amphisbaenia continue to be evolutionarily contested, and scientific classification will continue to shift with additional evidence and scientific reevaluation.

== Taxonomy ==
Taxonomic classification of amphisbaenians was traditionally based on morphological characters, such as the number of preanal pores, body annuli, tail annuli, and skull shape. Such characters are vulnerable to convergent evolution; in particular, the loss of the forelimbs and the evolution of specialized shovel-headed and keel-headed morphs appear to have occurred multiple times in the history of the group. Classifications based on mitochondrial DNA sequences and nuclear DNA sequences better reflect their true evolutionary history, and are now being used to distinguish genera of amphisbaenians.

The most ancient branch of the tree is the Rhineuridae. The remaining five families form a group to the exclusion of rhineurids. Bipedidae, Blanidae, and Cadeidae represent the most ancient divergences within this grouping, with Trogonophidae and Amphisbaenidae diverging more recently. South American amphisbaenids apparently are derived from African amphisbaenids that rafted across the Atlantic in the Eocene, about 40 million years ago. Cuban cadeids may be similarly derived from blanids that rafted across from northwestern Africa or southwestern Europe in a similar time frame.

Historically considered to be lizards, some studies have suggested that they should be considered separate from lizards, though many modern studies consider them to be true lizards, as they are closely related to other lizards of the clade Lacertoidea.

=== Families ===
Six extant families of amphisbaenians are currently recognised:

- Amphisbaenidae Gray, 1865 – Amphisbaenids, tropical worm lizards of South America, some Caribbean islands, and Sub-Saharan Africa. (12 genera, 182 species)
- Bipedidae Taylor, 1951 – Only in Mexico and commonly called ajolotes, but not to be confused with axolotls (1 genus, 3 species)
- Blanidae Kearney & Stuart, 2004 – Anatolian, Iberian, and Moroccan worm lizards (1 genus, 7 species)
- Cadeidae Vidal and Hedges, 2008 – Cuban keel-headed worm lizards (1 genus, 2 species). Traditionally amphisbaenids, but shown by DNA to be closest to Blanidae.
- Rhineuridae Vanzolini, 1951 – North American worm lizards (1 genus, 1 species)
- Trogonophidae Gray, 1865 – Palearctic worm lizards (4 genera, 6 species)

In addition, the following extinct families are also known from fossil remains:

- †Chthonophidae Longrich et al., 2015
- †Oligodontosauridae Estes, 1975
- †Polyodontobaenidae Folie, Smith & Smith, 2013

Another fossil family, the †Crythiosauridae, was also previously placed in this group, but has since been removed due to a lack of evidence placing it within the amphisbaenians.

=== Phylogeny ===
The following cladogram shows the relationships between the six amphisbaenian families determined in the phylogenetic analysis of mitochondrial and nuclear genes by Vidal et al. (2008).

- Amphisbaenia
  - Rhineuridae (Florida)
  - - - - - Blanidae (Mediterranean region)
          - Cadeidae (Cuba)
        - Bipedidae (Mexico)
      - - Trogonophidae (Africa, Middle East)
        - Amphisbaenidae (Africa, South America, Caribbean)
