= List of reptiles of Brazil =

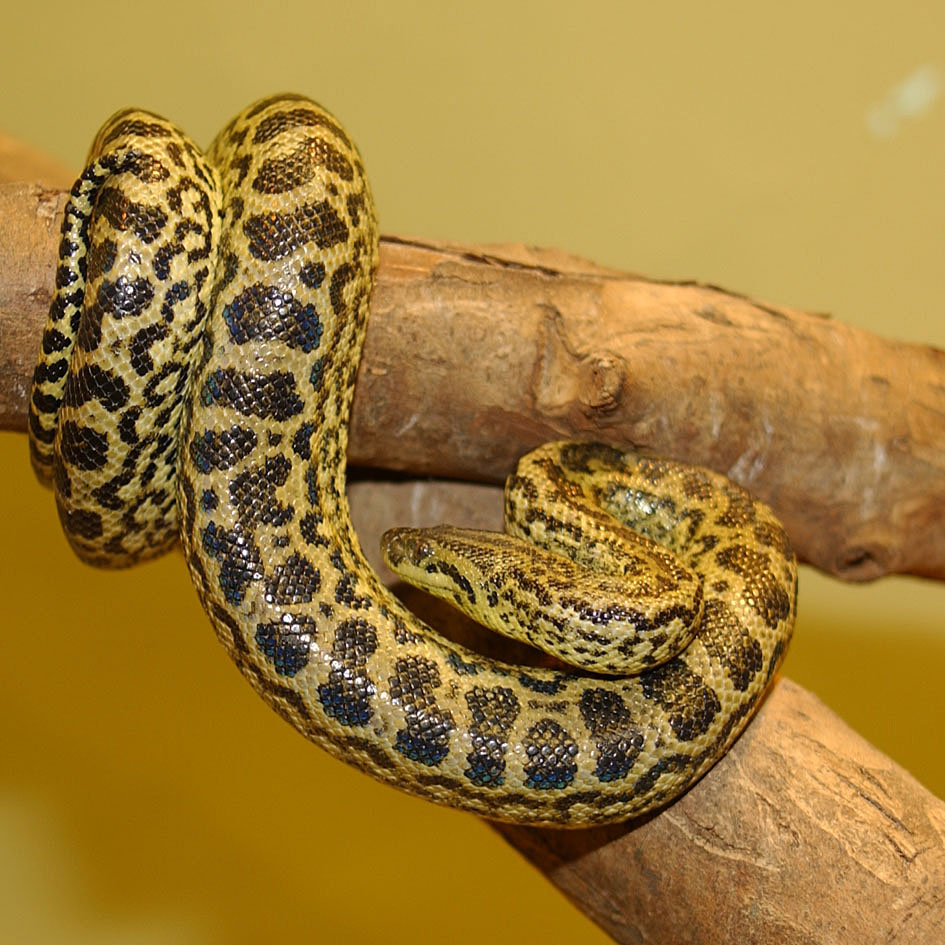
Yellow anaconda, Eunectes notaeus

Total number of species = 648

Nota bene: In the following list, a binomial authority in parentheses indicates that the species was originally described in a genus other than the genus to which it is currently assigned.

== Testudines ==
=== Cheloniidae (4 species) ===
- Caretta caretta (Linnaeus, 1758)
- Chelonia mydas (Linnaeus, 1758)
- Eretmochelys imbricata (Linnaeus, 1766)
- Lepidochelys olivacea (Eschscholtz, 1829)

=== Dermochelyidae (1 species) ===
- Dermochelys coriacea (Linnaeus, 1766)

=== Emydidae (2 species) ===
- Trachemys adiutrix Vanzolini, 1995
- Trachemys dorbigni (A.M.C. Duméril & Bibron, 1835)

=== Geoemydidae (1 species) ===
- Rhinoclemmys punctularia (Daudin, 1801)

=== Kinosternidae (1 species) ===
- Kinosternon scorpioides (Linnaeus, 1766)

=== Testudinidae (2 species) ===
- Chelonoidis carbonarius (Spix, 1824)
- Chelonoidis denticulatus (Linnaeus, 1766)

=== Podocnemididae (5 species) ===
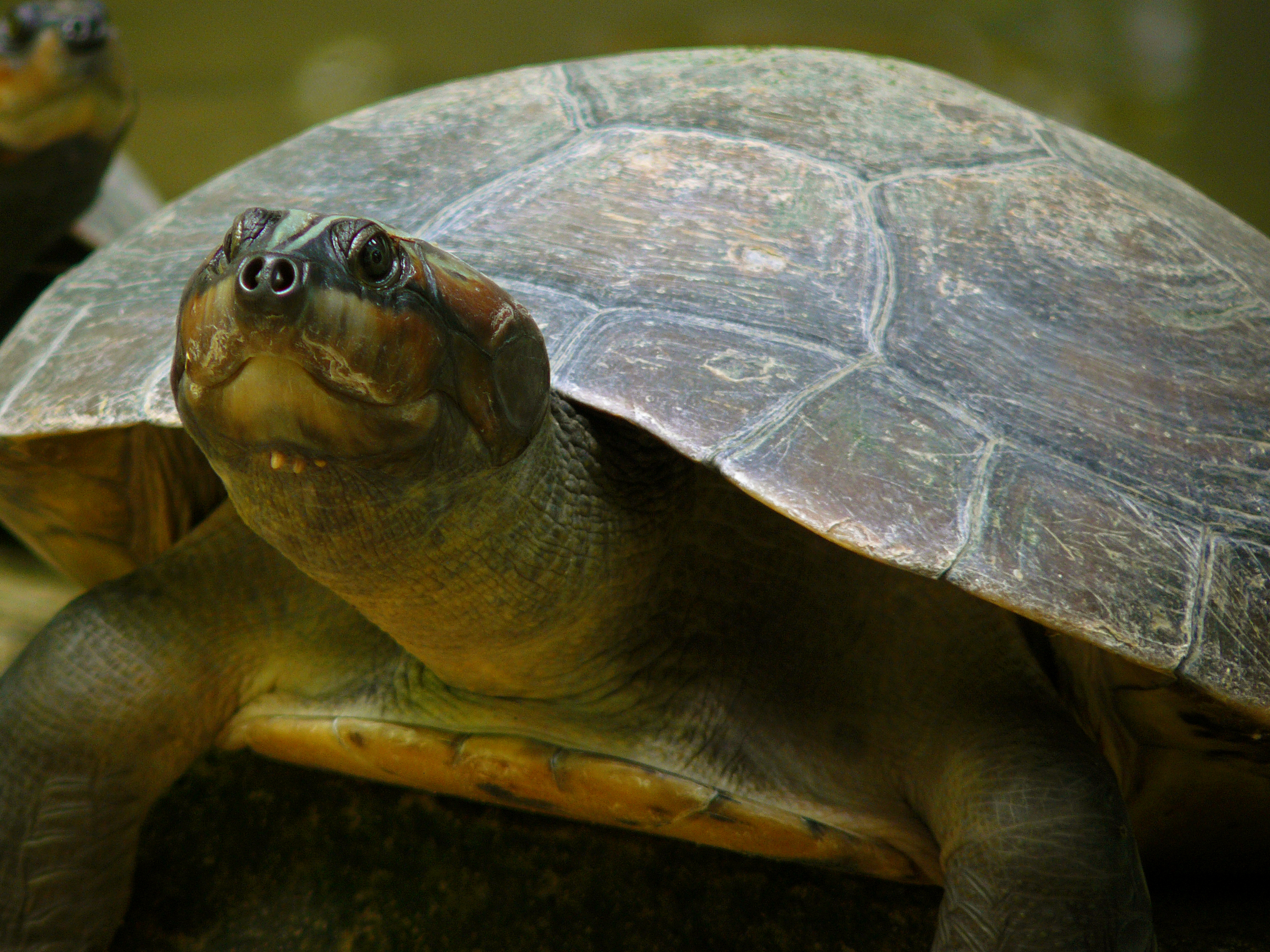
Arrau turtle (Podocnemis expansa)

- Peltocephalus dumerilianus (Schweigger, 1812)
- Podocnemis erythrocephala (Spix, 1824)
- Podocnemis expansa (Schweigger, 1812)
- Podocnemis sextuberculata Cornalia, 1849
- Podocnemis unifilis Troschel, 1848

=== Chelidae (18 species) ===
Nomenclature based on Rhodin et al., 2010

- Acanthochelys macrocephala Rhodin, Mittermeier & McMorris, 1984
- Acanthochelys radiolata (Mikan, 1820)
- Acanthochelys spixii (A.M.C. Duméril & Bibron, 1835)
- Chelus fimbriata (Schneider, 1783)
- Hydromedusa maximiliani (Mikan, 1820)
- Hydromedusa tectifera Cope, 1869
- Mesoclemmys gibba (Schweigger, 1812)
- Mesoclemmys nasuta (Schweigger, 1812)
- Mesoclemmys raniceps (Gray, 1855)
- Mesoclemmys tuberculata (Lüderwaldt, 1926)
- Mesoclemmys vanderhaegei (Bour, 1973)
- Phrynops geoffroanus (Schweigger, 1812)
- Phrynops hilarii (A.M.C. Duméril & Bibron, 1835)
- Phrynops tuberosus (W. Peters, 1870)
- Phrynops williamsi Rhodin & Mittermeier, 1983
- Platemys platycephala (Schneider, 1792)
- Ranacephala hogei (Mertens, 1967)
- Rhinemys rufipes (Spix, 1824)

== Crocodilia ==
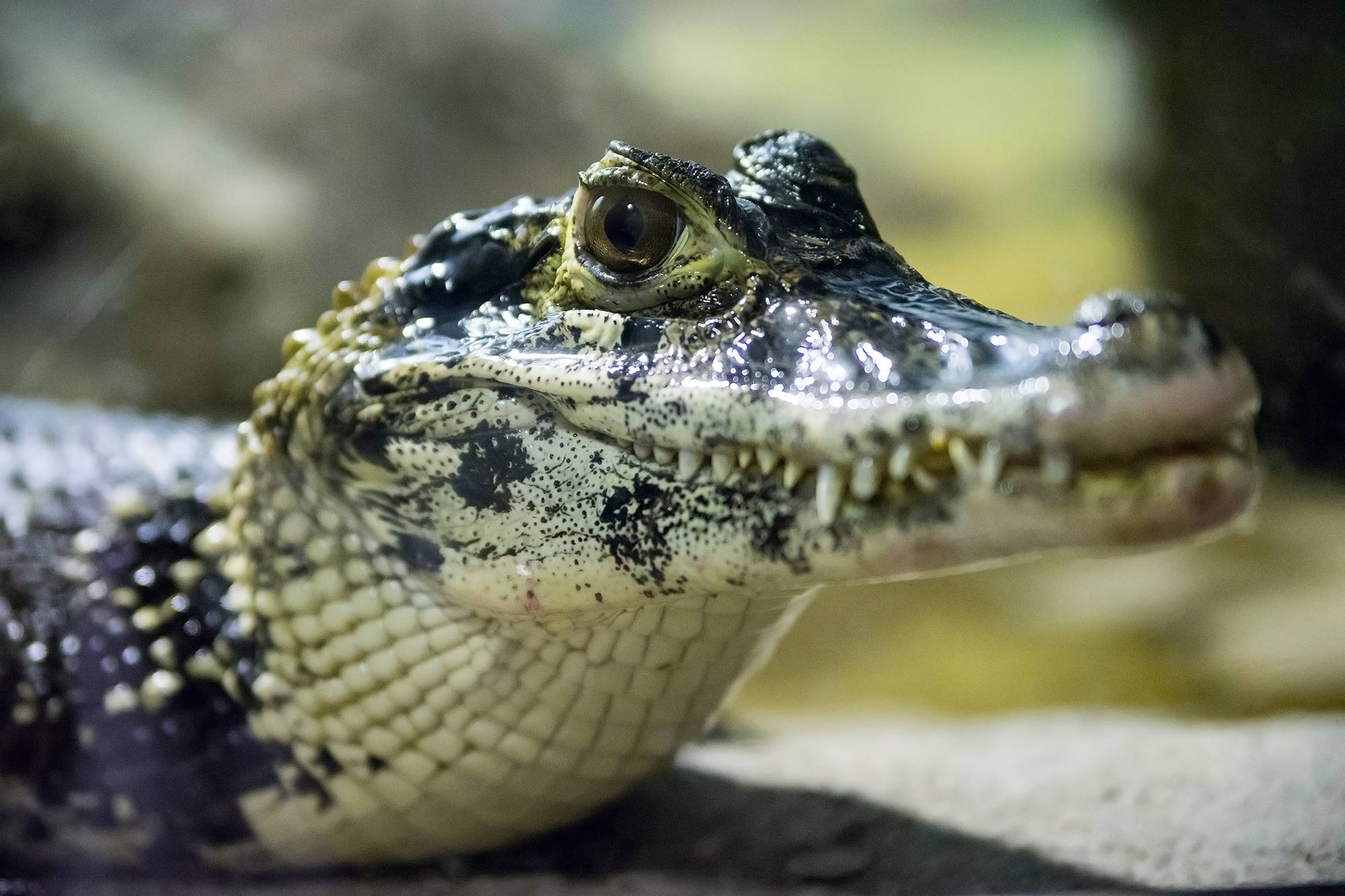
Black caiman (Melanosuchus niger)

=== Alligatoridae (6 species) ===
- Caiman crocodilus (Linnaeus, 1758)
- Caiman latirostris (Daudin, 1802)
- Caiman yacare (Daudin, 1802)
- Melanosuchus niger (Spix, 1825)
- Paleosuchus palpebrosus (Cuvier, 1807)
- Paleosuchus trigonatus (Schneider, 1801)

== Squamata ==
=== Amphisbaenidae (50 species) ===
- Amphisbaena absaberi (Strüssmann & Carvalho, 2001)
- Amphisbaena alba Linnaeus, 1758
- Amphisbaena anaemariae Vanzolini, 1997
- Amphisbaena anomala (Barbour, 1914)
- Amphisbaena arda Rodrigues, 2003
- Amphisbaena arenaria Vanzolini, 1991
- Amphisbaena bahiana Vanzolini, 1964
- Amphisbaena bedai (Vanzolini, 1991)
- Amphisbaena bilabialata (Stimson, 1972)
- Amphisbaena bolivica Mertens, 1929
- Amphisbaena brasiliana (Gray, 1865)
- Amphisbaena camura Cope, 1862
- Amphisbaena carvalhoi Gans, 1965
- Amphisbaena crisae Vanzolini, 1997
- Amphisbaena cuiabana (Strüssmann & Carvalho, 2001)
- Amphisbaena cunhai Hoogmoed & Ávila-Pires, 1991
- Amphisbaena darwinii A.M.C. Duméril & Bibron, 1839
- Amphisbaena dubia L. Müller, 1924
- Amphisbaena frontalis Vanzolini, 1991
- Amphisbaena fuliginosa Linnaeus, 1758
- Amphisbaena hastata Vanzolini, 1991
- Amphisbaena heathi K.P. Schmidt, 1936
- Amphisbaena hogei Vanzolini, 1950
- Amphisbaena ibijara Rodrigues, Andrade & Lima, 2003
- Amphisbaena ignatiana Vanzolini, 1991
- Amphisbaena kingii (Bell, 1833)
- Amphisbaena kraoh (Vanzolini, 1971)
- Amphisbaena leeseri Gans, 1964
- Amphisbaena leucocephala W. Peters, 1878
- Amphisbaena lumbricalis Vanzolini, 1996
- Amphisbaena mensae Castro-Mello, 2000
- Amphisbaena mertensi Strauch, 1881
- Amphisbaena miringoera Vanzolini, 1971
- Amphisbaena mitchelli Procter, 1923
- Amphisbaena munoai Klappenbach, 1966
- Amphisbaena neglecta Dunn & Piatt, 1936
- Amphisbaena nigricauda Gans, 1966
- Amphisbaena pretrei A.M.C. Duméril & Bibron, 1839
- Amphisbaena prunicolor (Cope, 1885)
- Amphisbaena ridleyi Boulenger, 1890
- Amphisbaena roberti Gans, 1964
- Amphisbaena sanctaeritae Vanzolini, 1994
- Amphisbaena saxosa (Castro-Mello, 2003)
- Amphisbaena silvestrii Boulenger, 1902
- Amphisbaena slevini K.P. Schmidt, 1938
- Amphisbaena steindachneri Strauch, 1881
- Amphisbaena talisiae Vanzolini, 1995
- Amphisbaena tragorrhectes Vanzolini, 1971
- Amphisbaena vanzolinii Gans, 1963
- Amphisbaena vermicularis Wagler, 1824

=== Rhineuridae (7 species) ===
- Leposternon infraorbitale (Bertold, 1859)
- Leposternon kisteumacheri Porto, Soares & Caramaschi, 2000
- Leposternon microcephalum Wagler, 1824
- Leposternon octostegum (A.H.A. Duméril, 1851)
- Leposternon polystegum (A.H.A. Duméril, 1851)
- Leposternon scutigerum (Hemprich, 1829)
- Leposternon wuchereri (W. Peters, 1879)

=== Iguanidae (1 species) ===
- Iguana iguana (Linnaeus, 1758)

=== Hoplocercidae (3 species) ===
- Enyalioides laticeps (Guichenot, 1855)
- Enyalioides palpebralis (Boulenger, 1883)
- Hoplocercus spinosus Fitzinger, 1843

=== Polychrotidae (21 species) ===
- Anisolepis grilli Boulenger, 1891
- Anisolepis longicauda (Boulenger, 1891)
- Anisolepis undulatus (Wiegmann, 1834)
- Anolis auratus Daudin, 1802
- Anolis bombiceps Cope, 1876
- Anolis fuscoauratus d'Orbigny, 1837
- Anolis meridionalis Boettger, 1885
- Anolis nasofrontalis Amaral, 1933
- Anolis nitens (Wagler, 1830)
- Anolis ortonii Cope, 1868
- Anolis philopunctatus Rodrigues, 1988
- Anolis phyllorhinus Myers & Carvalho, 1945
- Anolis pseudotigrinus Amaral, 1933
- Anolis punctatus Daudin, 1802
- Anolis trachyderma Cope, 1876
- Anolis transversalis Duméril, 1851
- Anolis williamsii Bocourt, 1870
- Polychrus acutirostris Spix, 1825
- Polychrus liogaster Boulenger, 1908
- Polychrus marmoratus (Linnaeus, 1758)
- Urostrophus vautieri A.M.C. Duméril & Bibron, 1837

=== Leiosauridae (7 species) ===
- Enyalius bibronii Boulenger, 1885
- Enyalius bilineatus A.M.C. Duméril & Bibron, 1837
- Enyalius brasiliensis (Lesson, 1828)
- Enyalius catenatus (Wied, 1821)
- Enyalius iheringii Boulenger, 1885
- Enyalius leechii (Boulenger, 1885)
- Enyalius perditus Jackson, 1978

=== Tropiduridae (35 species) ===
- Eurolophosaurus amathites (Rodrigues, 1984)
- Eurolophosaurus nanuzae (Rodrigues, 1981)
- Eurolophosaurus divaricatus (Rodrigues, 1984)
- Liolaemus arambarensis Verrastro, Veronese, Bujes & Dias-Filho, 2003
- Liolaemus lutzae Mertens, 1938
- Liolaemus occipitalis Boulenger, 1885
- Plica plica (Linnaeus, 1758)
- Plica umbra (Linnaeus, 1758)
- Stenocercus azureus (F. Müller, 1882)
- Stenocercus caducus (Cope, 1862)
- Stenocercus dumerilii (Steindachner, 1867)
- Stenocercus fimbriatus Ávila-Pires, 1995
- Stenocercus roseiventris D'Orbigny, 1837
- Stenocercus tricristatus (A.H.A. Duméril, 1851)
- Strobilurus torquatus Wiegmann, 1834
- Tropidurus cocorobensis Rodrigues, 1987
- Tropidurus erythrocephalus Rodrigues, 1987
- Tropidurus etheridgei Cei, 1982
- Tropidurus guarani (Cope, 1862)
- Tropidurus helenae (Manzani & Abe, 1990)
- Tropidurus hispidus (Spix, 1825)
- Tropidurus hygomi J.T. Reinhardt & Luetken, 1861
- Tropidurus insulanus Rodrigues, 1987
- Tropidurus itambere Rodrigues, 1987
- Tropidurus montanus Rodrigues, 1987
- Tropidurus mucujensis Rodrigues, 1987
- Tropidurus oreadicus Rodrigues, 1987
- Tropidurus pinima (Rodrigues, 1984)
- Tropidurus psammonastes Rodrigues, Kasahara & Yonenaga-Yasuda, 1988
- Tropidurus semitaeniatus (Spix, 1825)
- Tropidurus spinulosus (Cope, 1862)
- Tropidurus torquatus (Wied, 1820)
- Uracentron azureum (Linnaeus, 1758)
- Uracentron flaviceps (Guichenot, 1855)
- Uranoscodon superciliosus (Linnaeus, 1758)

=== Gekkonidae (29 species) ===
- Briba brasiliana Amaral, 1935
- Coleodactylus amazonicus (Andersson, 1918)
- Coleodactylus brachystoma (Amaral, 1935)
- Coleodactylus meridionalis (Boulenger, 1888)
- Coleodactylus natalensis Freire, 1999
- Coleodactylus septentrionalis (Vanzolini, 1980)
- Gonatodes annularis Boulenger, 1887
- Gonatodes eladioi Nascimento, Ávila-Pires & Cunha, 1987
- Gonatodes hasemani Griffin, 1917
- Gonatodes humeralis (Guichenot, 1855)
- Gonatodes tapajonicus Rodrigues, 1980
- Gymnodactylus darwinii (Gray, 1845)
- Gymnodactylus geckoides Spix, 1825
- Gymnodactylus guttulatus Vanzolini, 1982
- Hemidactylus agrius Vanzolini, 1978
- Hemidactylus mabouia (Moreau de Jonnès, 1818)
- Hemidactylus palaichthus Kluge, 1969
- Homonota fasciata (A.M.C. Duméril & Bibron, 1836)
- Homonota uruguayensis (Vaz-Ferreira & Sierra de Soriano, 1961)
- Lepidoblepharis heyerorum Vanzolini, 1978
- Lepidoblepharis hoogmoedi Ávila-Pires, 1995
- Lygodactylus klugei (H.M. Smith, Martin & Swain, 1977)
- Lygodactylus wetzeli (H.M. Smith, Martin & Swain, 1977)
- Phyllopezus lutzae Loveridge, 1941
- Phyllopezus periosus Rodrigues, 1986
- Phyllopezus pollicaris (Spix, 1825)
- Pseudogonatodes gasconi Ávila-Pires & Hoogmoed, 2000
- Pseudogonatodes guianensis Parker, 1935
- Thecadactylus rapicauda (Houttuyn, 1782)

=== Anguidae (5 species) ===
- Diploglossus fasciatus (Gray, 1831)
- Diploglossus lessonae Peracca, 1890
- Ophiodes striatus (Spix, 1824)
- Ophiodes vertebralis Bocourt, 1881
- Ophiodes yacupoi Gallardo, 1966

=== Teiidae (31 species) ===
- Ameiva ameiva (Linnaeus, 1758)
- Cnemidophorus abaetensis Dias, Rocha & Vrcibradic, 2002
- Cnemidophorus cryptus Cole & Dessauer, 1993
- Cnemidophorus lacertoides A.M.C. Duméril & Bibron, 1839
- Cnemidophorus lemniscatus (Linnaeus, 1758)
- Cnemidophorus littoralis Rocha, Araújo, Vrcibradic & Costa, 2000
- Cnemidophorus mumbuca Colli et al., 2003
- Cnemidophorus nativo Rocha, Bergallo & Peccinini-Seale, 1997
- Cnemidophorus ocellifer (Spix, 1825)
- Cnemidophorus parecis Colli et al., 2003
- Cnemidophorus vacariensis Feltrim & Lema, 2000
- Crocodilurus amazonicus Spix, 1825
- Dracaena guianensis Daudin, 1802
- Dracaena paraguayensis Amaral, 1950
- Kentropyx altamazonica (Cope, 1876)
- Kentropyx calcarata Spix, 1825
- Kentropyx intermedia (Gray, 1831)
- Kentropyx paulensis Boettger, 1893
- Kentropyx pelviceps Cope, 1868
- Kentropyx striata (Daudin, 1802)
- Kentropyx vanzoi Gallagher & Dixon, 1980
- Kentropyx viridistriga Boulenger, 1894
- Teius oculatus (D'Orbigny & Bibron, 1837)
- Teius teyou (Daudin, 1802)
- Tupinambis duseni Lönnberg, 1896
- Tupinambis longilineus Ávila-Pires, 1995
- Tupinambis merianae (A.M.C. Duméril & Bibron, 1839)
- Tupinambis palustris Manzani & Abe, 2002
- Tupinambis quadrilineatus Manzani & Abe, 1997
- Tupinambis rufescens (Günther, 1871)
- Tupinambis teguixin (Linnaeus, 1758)

=== Gymnophthalmidae (71 species) ===
- Alopoglossus angulatus (Linnaeus, 1758)
- Alopoglossus atriventris Duellman, 1973
- Alopoglossus buckleyi (O'Shaughnessy, 1881)
- Amapasaurus tetradactylus Cunha,
- Anotosaura collaris Amaral, 1933
- Anotosaura vanzolinia Dixon, 1974
- Arthrosaura kockii (Lidth de Jeune, 1904)
- Arthrosaura reticulata (O'Shaughnessy, 1881)
- Bachia bresslaui (Amaral, 1935)
- Bachia cacerensis Castrillon & Strüssmann, 1998
- Bachia dorbignyi (A.M.C. Duméril & Bibron, 1839)
- Bachia flavescens (Bonnaterre, 1789)
- Bachia panoplia Thomas, 1965
- Bachia peruana (F. Werner, 1901)
- Bachia scolecoides Vanzolini, 1961
- Bachia trisanale (Cope, 1868)
- Calyptommatus confusionibus Rodrigues, Zaher & Curcio, 2001
- Calyptommatus leiolepis Rodrigues, 1991
- Calyptommatus nicterus Rodrigues, 1991
- Calyptommatus sinebrachiatus Rodrigues, 1991
- Cercosaura argulus W. Peters, 1863
- Cercosaura eigenmanni (Griffin, 1917)
- Cercosaura ocellata Wagler, 1830
- Cercosaura oshaughnessyi (Boulenger, 1885)
- Cercosaura quadrilineata (Boettger, 1876)
- Cercosaura schreibersii Wiegmann, 1834
- Colobodactylus dalcyanus Vanzolini & Ramos, 1977
- Colobodactylus taunayi (Amaral, 1933)
- Colobosaura mentalis Amaral, 1933
- Colobosaura modesta (J.T. Reinhardt & Luetken, 1862)
- Colobosauroides carvalhoi Soares & Caramaschi, 1998
- Colobosauroides cearensis Cunha, Lima-Verde & Lima, 1991
- Ecpleopus gaudichaudii A.M.C. Duméril & Bibron, 1839
- Gymnophthalmus leucomystax Vanzolini & Carvalho, 1991
- Gymnophthalmus underwoodi Grant, 1958
- Gymnophthalmus vanzoi Carvalho, 1999
- Heterodactylus imbricatus Spix, 1825
- Heterodactylus lundii (J.T. Reinhardt & Luetken, 1862)
- Iphisa elegans Gray, 1851
- Leposoma annectans Ruibal, 1952
- Leposoma baturitensis Rodrigues & Borges, 1997
- Leposoma guianense Ruibal, 1952
- Leposoma nanodactylus Rodrigues, 1997
- Leposoma osvaldoi Ávila-Pires, 1995
- Leposoma parietale (Cope, 1885)
- Leposoma percarinatum (L. Müller, 1923)
- Leposoma puk Rodrigues, 2002
- Leposoma scincoides Spix, 1825
- Leposoma snethlageae Ávila-Pires, 1995
- Micrablepharus atticolus Rodrigues, 1996
- Micrablepharus maximiliani (J.T. Reinhardt & Luetken, 1862)
- Neusticurus bicarinatus (Linnaeus, 1758)
- Neusticurus ecpleopus Cope, 1875
- Neusticurus juruazensis Ávila-Pires & Vitt, 1998
- Neusticurus ocellatus Sinitsin, 1930
- Neusticurus racenisi Roze, 1958
- Neusticurus rudis Boulenger, 1900
- Neusticurus tatei C.E. Burt & M.D. Burt, 1931
- Nothobachia ablephara Rodrigues, 1984
- Placosoma cipoense Cunha, 1966
- Placosoma cordylinum Tschudi, 1847
- Placosoma glabellum (W. Peters, 1870)
- Procellosaurinus erythrocercus Rodrigues, 1991
- Procellosaurinus tetradactylus Rodrigues, 1991
- Psilophthalmus paeminosus Rodrigues, 1991
- Ptychoglossus brevifrontalis Boulenger, 1912
- Rachysaurus brachylepis (Dixon, 1974)
- Stenolepis ridleyi Boulenger, 1887
- Tretioscincus agilis (Ruthven, 1916)
- Tretioscincus oriximinensis Ávila-Pires, 1995
- Vanzosaura rubricauda (Boulenger, 1902)

=== Scincidae (14 species) ===
- Aspronema dorsivittatum Cope, 1862
- Brasiliscincus agilis (Raddi, 1823)
- Brasiliscincus caissara Rebouças-Spieker, 1974
- Brasiliscincus heathi K.P. Schmidt & Inger, 1951
- Copeoglossum arajara Rebouças-Spieker, 1981
- Copeoglossum nigropunctatum (Spix, 1825)
- Exila nigropalmata Andersson, 1918
- Manicola guaporicola Dunn, 1936
- Notomabuya frenata (Cope, 1862)
- Panopa carvalhoi Rebouças-Spieker & Vanzolini, 1990
- Psychosaura agmosticha Rodrigues, 2000
- Psychosaura macrorhyncha Hoge, 1947
- Trachylepis atlantica (K.P. Schmidt, 1945)
- Varzea bistriata (Spix, 1825)

== Squamata - Serpentes ==
=== Anomalepididae (4 species) ===
- Liotyphlops beui (Amaral, 1924)
- Liotyphlops ternetzii (Boulenger, 1896)
- Liotyphlops wilderi (Garman, 1883)
- Typhlophis squamosus (Schlegel, 1839)

=== Leptotyphlopidae (12 species) ===
- Leptotyphlops albifrons (Wagler, 1824)
- Leptotyphlops australis Freiberg & Orejas-Miranda, 1968
- Leptotyphlops borapeliotes Vanzolini, 1996
- Leptotyphlops brasiliensis Laurent, 1949
- Leptotyphlops cupinensis Bailey & Carvalho, 1946
- Leptotyphlops diaplocius Orejas-Miranda, 1969
- Leptotyphlops dimidiatus (Jan, 1861)
- Leptotyphlops koppesi Amaral, 1955
- Leptotyphlops macrolepis (W. Peters, 1857)
- Leptotyphlops munoai Orejas-Miranda, 1961
- Leptotyphlops salgueiroi Amaral, 1955
- Leptotyphlops septemstriatus (Schneider, 1801)

=== Typhlopidae (6 species) ===
- Typhlops amoipira Rodrigues & Juncá, 2002
- Typhlops brongersmianus Vanzolini, 1976
- Typhlops minuisquamus Dixon & Hendricks, 1979
- Typhlops paucisquamus Dixon & Hendricks, 1979
- Typhlops reticulatus (Linnaeus, 1758)
- Typhlops yonenagae Rodrigues, 1991

=== Aniliidae (1 species) ===
- Anilius scytale (Linnaeus, 1758)

=== Tropidophiidae (1 species) ===
- Tropidophis paucisquamis (F. Müller, 1901)

=== Boidae (8 species) ===
- Boa constrictor Linnaeus, 1758
- Corallus caninus (Linnaeus, 1758)
- Corallus cropanii (Hoge, 1953)
- Corallus hortulanus (Linnaeus, 1758)
- Epicrates cenchria (Linnaeus, 1758)
- Eunectes deschauenseei Dunn & Conant, 1936
- Eunectes murinus (Linnaeus, 1758)
- Eunectes notaeus Cope, 1862

=== Colubridae (237 species) ===
- Apostolepis albicollaris Lema, 2002
- Apostolepis ambiniger (W. Peters, 1869)
- Apostolepis arenaria Rodrigues, 1992
- Apostolepis assimilis (J.T. Reinhardt, 1861)
- Apostolepis cearensis Gomes, 1915
- Apostolepis cerradoensis Lema, 2003
- Apostolepis christineae Lema, 2002
- Apostolepis dimidiata (Jan, 1862)
- Apostolepis dorbignyi (Schlegel, 1837)
- Apostolepis flavotorquata (A.M.C. Duméril, Bibron & A.H.A. Duméril, 1854)
- Apostolepis gaboi Rodrigues, 1992
- Apostolepis goiasensis Prado, 1942
- Apostolepis intermedia Koslowsky, 1898
- Apostolepis lineata Cope, 1887
- Apostolepis longicaudata Amaral, 1921
- Apostolepis niceforoi Amaral, 1935
- Apostolepis nigroterminata Boulenger, 1896
- Apostolepis polylepis Amaral, 1921
- Apostolepis pymi Boulenger, 1903
- Apostolepis quirogai Giraudo & Scrocchi, 1998
- Apostolepis rondoni Amaral, 1925
- Apostolepis sanctaeritae F. Werner, 1924
- Apostolepis vittata (Cope, 1887)
- Atractus albuquerquei Cunha & Nascimento, 1983
- Atractus alphonsehogei Cunha & Nascimento, 1983
- Atractus badius (F. Boie, 1827)
- Atractus elaps (Günther, 1858)
- Atractus flammigerus (F. Boie, 1827)
- Atractus guentheri (Wucherer, 1861)
- Atractus insipidus Roze, 1961
- Atractus latifrons (Günther, 1868)
- Atractus maculatus Günther, 1858
- Atractus major Boulenger, 1894
- Atractus natans Hoogmoed & Prudente, 2003
- Atractus pantostictus Fernandes & Puorto, 1993
- Atractus poeppigi (Jan, 1862)
- Atractus potschi Fernandes, 1995
- Atractus reticulatus (Boulenger, 1885)
- Atractus schach (Boie, 1827)
- Atractus serranus Amaral, 1930
- Atractus snethlageae Cunha & Nascimento, 1983
- Atractus taeniatus Griffin, 1916
- Atractus torquatus (A.M. C. Duméril, Bibron & A.H.A. Duméril, 1854)
- Atractus trihedrurus Amaral, 1926
- Atractus trilineatus Wagler, 1828
- Atractus zebrinus (Jan, 1862)
- Atractus zidoki Gasc & Rodrigues, 1979
- Boiruna maculata (Boulenger, 1896)
- Boiruna sertaneja Zaher, 1996
- Calamodontophis paucidens (Amaral, 1935)
- Cercophis auratus (Schlegel, 1837)
- Chironius bicarinatus (Wied, 1820)
- Chironius carinatus (Linnaeus, 1758)
- Chironius exoletus (Linnaeus, 1758)
- Chironius flavolineatus (Boettger, 1885)
- Chironius fuscus (Linnaeus, 1758)
- Chironius laevicollis (Wied, 1824)
- Chironius laurenti Dixon, Wiest & Cei, 1993
- Chironius multiventris K.P. Schmidt & Walker, 1943
- Chironius quadricarinatus (F. Boie, 1827)
- Chironius scurrulus (Wagler, 1824)
- Chlorosoma viridissimum (Linnaeus, 1758)
- Clelia bicolor (Peracca, 1904)
- Clelia clelia (Daudin, 1803)
- Clelia hussami Morato, Franco & Sanches, 2003
- Clelia montana Franco, Marques & Puorto, 1997
- Clelia plumbea (Wied, 1820)
- Clelia quimi Franco, Marques & Puorto, 1997
- Clelia rustica (Cope, 1878)
- Dendrophidion dendrophis (Schlegel, 1837)
- Dipsas albifrons (Sauvage, 1884)
- Dipsas alternans (Fischer, 1885)
- Dipsas catesbyi (Sentzen, 1796)
- Dipsas incerta (Jan, 1863)
- Dipsas indica Laurenti, 1768
- Dipsas neivai (Amaral, 1926)
- Dipsas pavonina Schlegel, 1837
- Dipsas variegata (A.M.C. Duméril, Bibron & A.H.A. Duméril, 1854)
- Ditaxodon taeniatus (Hensel, 1868)
- Drepanoides anomalus (Jan, 1863)
- Drymarchon corais (F. Boie, 1827)
- Drymobius rhombifer (Günther, 1860)
- Drymoluber brazili (Gomes, 1918)
- Drymoluber dichrous (W. Peters, 1863)
- Echinanthera affinis (Günther, 1858)
- Echinanthera amoena (Jan, 1863)
- Echinanthera bilineata (Fischer, 1885)
- Echinanthera brevirostris (W. Peters, 1863)
- Echinanthera cephalomaculata Di-Bernardo, 1994
- Echinanthera cephalostriata Di-Bernardo, 1996
- Echinanthera cyanopleura (Cope, 1885)
- Echinanthera melanostigma (Wagler, 1824)
- Echinanthera occipitalis (Jan, 1863)
- Echinanthera persimilis (Cope, 1869)
- Echinanthera poecilopogon (Cope, 1863)
- Echinanthera undulata (Wied, 1824)
- Elapomorphus lepidus J.T. Reinhardt, 1861
- Elapomorphus quinquelineatus (Raddi, 1820)
- Elapomorphus wuchereri Günther, 1861
- Erythrolamprus aesculapii (Linnaeus, 1766)
- Erythrolamprus mimus (Cope, 1868)
- Gomesophis brasiliensis (Gomes, 1918)
- Helicops angulatus (Linnaeus, 1758)
- Helicops carinicauda (Wied, 1825)
- Helicops gomesi Amaral, 1921
- Helicops hagmanni Roux, 1910
- Helicops infrataeniatus (Jan, 1865)
- Helicops leopardinus (Schlegel, 1837)
- Helicops modestus Günther, 1861
- Helicops polylepis Günther, 1861
- Helicops trivittatus (Gray, 1849)
- Hydrodynastes bicinctus (Herrmann, 1804)
- Hydrodynastes gigas (A.M.C. Duméril, Bibron & A.H.A. Duméril, 1854)
- Hydrops martii (Wagler, 1824)
- Hydrops triangularis (Wagler, 1824)
- Imantodes cenchoa (Linnaeus, 1758)
- Leptodeira annulata (Linnaeus, 1758)
- Leptophis ahaetulla (Linnaeus, 1758)
- Lioheterophis iheringi Amaral, 1935
- Liophis almadensis (Wagler, 1824)
- Liophis amarali Wettstein, 1930
- Liophis anomalus (Günther, 1858)
- Liophis atraventer Dixon & Thomas, 1985
- Liophis breviceps Cope, 1861
- Liophis carajasensis Cunha, Nascimento & Ávila-Pires, 1985
- Liophis cobella (Linnaeus, 1758)
- Liophis dilepis (Cope, 1862)
- Liophis festae (Peracca, 1897)
- Liophis flavifrenatus (Cope, 1862)
- Liophis frenatus (F. Werner, 1909)
- Liophis jaegeri (Günther, 1858)
- Liophis lineatus (Linnaeus, 1758)
- Liophis maryellenae Dixon, 1985
- Liophis meridionalis (Schenkel, 1901)
- Liophis miliaris (Linnaeus, 1758)
- Liophis mossoroensis Hoge & Lima-Verde, 1972
- Liophis paucidens (Hoge, 1953)
- Liophis poecilogyrus (Wied, 1824)
- Liophis reginae (Linnaeus, 1758)
- Liophis taeniogaster Jan, 1863
- Liophis typhlus (Linnaeus, 1758)
- Liophis viridis Günther, 1862
- Lystrophis dorbignyi (A.M.C. Duméril, Bibron & A.H.A. Duméril, 1854)
- Lystrophis histricus (Jan, 1863)
- Lystrophis matogrossensis Scrocchi & Cruz, 1993
- Lystrophis nattereri (Steindachner, 1867)
- Masticophis mentovarius (A.M.C. Duméril, Bibron & A.H.A. Duméril, 1854)
- Mastigodryas bifossatus (Raddi, 1820)
- Mastigodryas boddaerti (Sentzen, 1796)
- Ninia hudsoni Parker, 1940
- Oxybelis aeneus (Wagler, 1824)
- Oxybelis fulgidus (Daudin, 1803)
- Oxyrhopus clathratus A.M.C. Duméril, Bibron & A.H.A. Duméril, 1854
- Oxyrhopus formosus (Wied, 1820)
- Oxyrhopus guibei Hoge & Romano, 1977
- Oxyrhopus melanogenys (Tschudi, 1845)
- Oxyrhopus petola (Linnaeus, 1758)
- Oxyrhopus rhombifer A.M.C. Duméril, Bibron & A.H.A. Duméril, 1854
- Oxyrhopus trigeminus A.M.C. Duméril, Bibron & A.H.A. Duméril, 1854
- Phalotris concolor Ferrarezzi, 1993
- Phalotris lativittatus Ferrarezzi, 1993
- Phalotris lemniscatus (A.M.C. Duméril, Bibron & A.H.A. Duméril, 1854)
- Phalotris mertensi (Hoge, 1955)
- Phalotris multipunctatus Puorto & Ferrarezzi, 1993
- Phalotris nasutus (Gomes, 1915)
- Phalotris tricolor Cope, 1861
- Philodryas aestiva (A.M.C. Duméril, Bibron & A.H.A. Duméril, 1854)
- Philodryas arnaldoi (Amaral, 1932)
- Philodryas livida (Amaral, 1923)
- Philodryas mattogrossensis Koslowsky, 1898
- Philodryas nattereri Steindachner, 1870
- Philodryas olfersii (Lichtenstein, 1823)
- Philodryas oligolepis Gomes, 1921
- Philodryas patagoniensis (Girard, 1857)
- Philodryas psammophidea Günther, 1872
- Phimophis chui Rodrigues, 1993
- Phimophis guerini (A.M.C. Duméril, Bibron & A.H.A. Duméril, 1854)
- Phimophis guianensis (Troschel, 1848)
- Phimophis iglesiasi (Gomes, 1915)
- Phimophis scriptorcibatus Rodrigues, 1993
- Pseudablabes agassizii (Jan, 1863)
- Pseudoboa coronata Schneider, 1801
- Pseudoboa haasi (Boettger, 1905)
- Pseudoboa neuwiedii (A.M.C. Duméril, Bibron & A.H.A. Duméril, 1854)
- Pseudoboa nigra (A.M.C. Duméril, Bibron & A.H.A. Duméril, 1854)
- Pseudoboa serrana Morato, Moura-Leite, Prudente & Bérnils, 1995
- Pseudoeryx plicatilis (Linnaeus, 1758)
- Pseustes cinnamomeus (Wagler, 1824)
- Pseustes poecilonotus (Günther, 1858)
- Pseustes sexcarinatus (Wagler, 1824)
- Pseustes sulphureus (Wagler, 1824)
- Psomophis genimaculatus (Boettger, 1885)
- Psomophis joberti (Sauvage, 1884)
- Psomophis obtusus (Cope, 1864)
- Ptychophis flavovirgatus Gomes, 1915
- Rhachidelus brazili Boulenger, 1908
- Rhinobothryum lentiginosum (Scopoli, 1785)
- Sibon nebulata (Linnaeus, 1758)
- Sibynomorphus mikanii (Schlegel, 1837)
- Sibynomorphus neuwiedi (Ihering, 1911)
- Sibynomorphus turgidus (Cope, 1868)
- Sibynomorphus ventrimaculatus (Boulenger, 1885)
- Simophis rhinostoma (Schlegel, 1837)
- Siphlophis cervinus (Laurenti, 1768)
- Siphlophis compressus (Daudin, 1803)
- Siphlophis leucocephalus (Günther, 1863)
- Siphlophis longicaudatus (Andersson, 1907)
- Siphlophis pulcher (Raddi, 1820)
- Siphlophis worontzowi (Prado, 1940)
- Sordellina punctata (W. Peters, 1880)
- Spilotes pullatus (Linnaeus, 1758)
- Taeniophallus nicagus (Cope, 1895)
- Tantilla boipiranga Sawaya & Sazima, 2003
- Tantilla melanocephala (Linnaeus, 1758)
- Thamnodynastes almae Franco & Ferreira, 2003
- Thamnodynastes chaquensis Bergna & Alvarez, 1993
- Thamnodynastes hypoconia (Cope, 1860)
- Thamnodynastes longicaudus Franco, Ferreira. Marques & Sazima, 2003
- Thamnodynastes pallidus (Linnaeus, 1758)
- Thamnodynastes rutilus (Prado, 1942)
- Thamnodynastes strigatus (Günther, 1858)
- Tomodon dorsatus A.M.C. Duméril, Bibron & A.H.A. Duméril, 1854
- Tomodon ocellatus A.M.C. Duméril, Bibron & A.H.A. Duméril, 1854
- Tropidodryas serra (Schlegel, 1837)
- Tropidodryas striaticeps (Cope, 1869)
- Umbrivaga pygmaea (Cope, 1868)
- Uromacerina ricardinii (Peracca, 1897)
- Urotheca euryzona Cope, 1862
- Waglerophis merremii (Wagler, 1824)
- Xenodon guentheri Boulenger, 1894
- Xenodon neuwiedii Günther, 1863
- Xenodon rhabdocephalus (Wied, 1824)
- Xenodon severus (Linnaeus, 1758)
- Xenopholis scalaris (Wucherer, 1861)
- Xenopholis undulatus (Jensen, 1900)
- Xenoxybelis argenteus (Daudin, 1803)
- Xenoxybelis boulengeri (Procter, 1923)

=== Elapidae (34 species) ===
- Leptomicrurus collaris (Schlegel, 1837)
- Leptomicrurus narduccii (Jan, 1863)
- Leptomicrurus scutiventris (Cope, 1870)
- Micrurus altirostris (Cope, 1860)
- Micrurus annellatus (W. Peters, 1871)
- Micrurus averyi K.P. Schmidt, 1939
- Micrurus albicinctus (Amaral, 1926)
- Micrurus brasiliensis Roze, 1967
- Micrurus boicora (Bernarde, Turci, Abegg & Franco, 2018)
- Micrurus corallinus (Merrem, 1820)
- Micrurus decoratus (Jan, 1858)
- Micrurus diana (Rose, 1983)
- Micrurus filiformis (Günther, 1859)
- Micrurus frontalis (A.M.C. Duméril, Bibron & A.H.A. Duméril, 1854)
- Micrurus hemprichii (Jan, 1858)
- Micrurus ibiboboca (Merrem, 1820)
- Micrurus isoznus (Cope, 1860)
- Micrurus langsdorffi Wagler, 1824
- Micrurus lemniscatus (Linnaeus, 1758)
- Micrurus pacaraimae Carvalho, 2002
- Micrurus paraensis Cunha & Nascimento, 1973
- Micrurus psyches (Daudin, 1803)
- Micrurus pyrrhocryptus (Cope, 1862)
- Micrurus potyguara (Pires, Silva, Fitosa, Prudentes, Pereira filho e Zaher, 2014)
- Micrurus putumayensis (Lancini, 1962)
- Micrurus spixii Wagler, 1824
- Micrurus surinamensis (Cuvier, 1817)
- Micrurus silviae (Di-Bernardo, Borges Martins & Silva, 2007)
- Micrurus tricolor Hoge, 1956
- Micrurus tikuna (Feitosa Da ilva, Pires, Zaher & Prudente, 2015)
- Micrurus remotus (Roze, 1987)
- Micrurus ornatissimus (Jan, 1858)
- Micrurus nattereri (Schmidt, 1952)
- Micrurus mipartitus (Duméril, Bibron & Duméril)

=== Viperidae (31 species) ===
- Bothrocophias hyoprora (Amaral, 1935)
- Bothrocophias microphthalmus (Cope, 1875)
- Bothrops alcatraz Marques, Martins & Sazima, 2002
- Bothrops alternatus A.M.C. Duméril, Bibron & A.H.A. Duméril, 1854
- Bothrops atrox (Linnaeus, 1758)
- Bothrops bilineatus (Wied, 1825)
- Bothrops brazili Hoge, 1954
- Bothrops cotiara (Gomes, 1913)
- Bothrops diporus Cope, 1862
- Bothrops erythromelas Amaral, 1923
- Bothrops fonsecai Hoge & Belluomini, 1959
- Bothrops insularis (Amaral, 1921)
- Bothrops itapetiningae (Boulenger, 1907)
- Bothrops jararaca (Wied, 1824)
- Bothrops jararacussu Lacerda, 1884
- Bothrops leucurus Wagler, 1824
- Bothrops lutzi (Miranda-Ribeiro, 1915)
- Bothrops marajoensis Hoge, 1966
- Bothrops mattogrossensis Amaral, 1925
- Bothrops moojeni Hoge, 1966
- Bothrops muriciensis Ferrarezzi & Freire, 2001
- Bothrops marmoratus (Silva & Rodrigues, 2008)
- Bothrops neuwiedi Wagler, 1824
- Bothrops pauloensis Amaral, 1925
- Bothrops pirajai Amaral, 1923
- Bothrops pubescens (Cope, 1870)
- Bothrops taeniatus (Wagler, 1824)
- Bothrops otavioi (Barbo, Grazziotin, Sazima, Martins & Sawaya, 2012)
- Bothrops sazimai (Barbo, Gasparini, Almeida, Zaher, Grazziotin, Gusmão, Ferrarini & Sawaya, 2016)
- Crotalus durissus Linnaeus, 1758
- Lachesis muta (Linnaeus, 1766)

== See also ==
- Wildlife of Brazil
- List of amphibians in Brazil
- List of Brazilian birds
- List of Brazilian mammals
- List of regional reptiles lists
