= A. nigricauda =

A. nigricauda may refer to:

- Acanthurus nigricauda, the epaulette surgeonfish, a fish species
- Amphisbaena nigricauda, a worm lizard species found in Brazil
- Anaxibia nigricauda, a spider species endemic to Sri Lanka

== See also ==
- Nigricauda (disambiguation)
