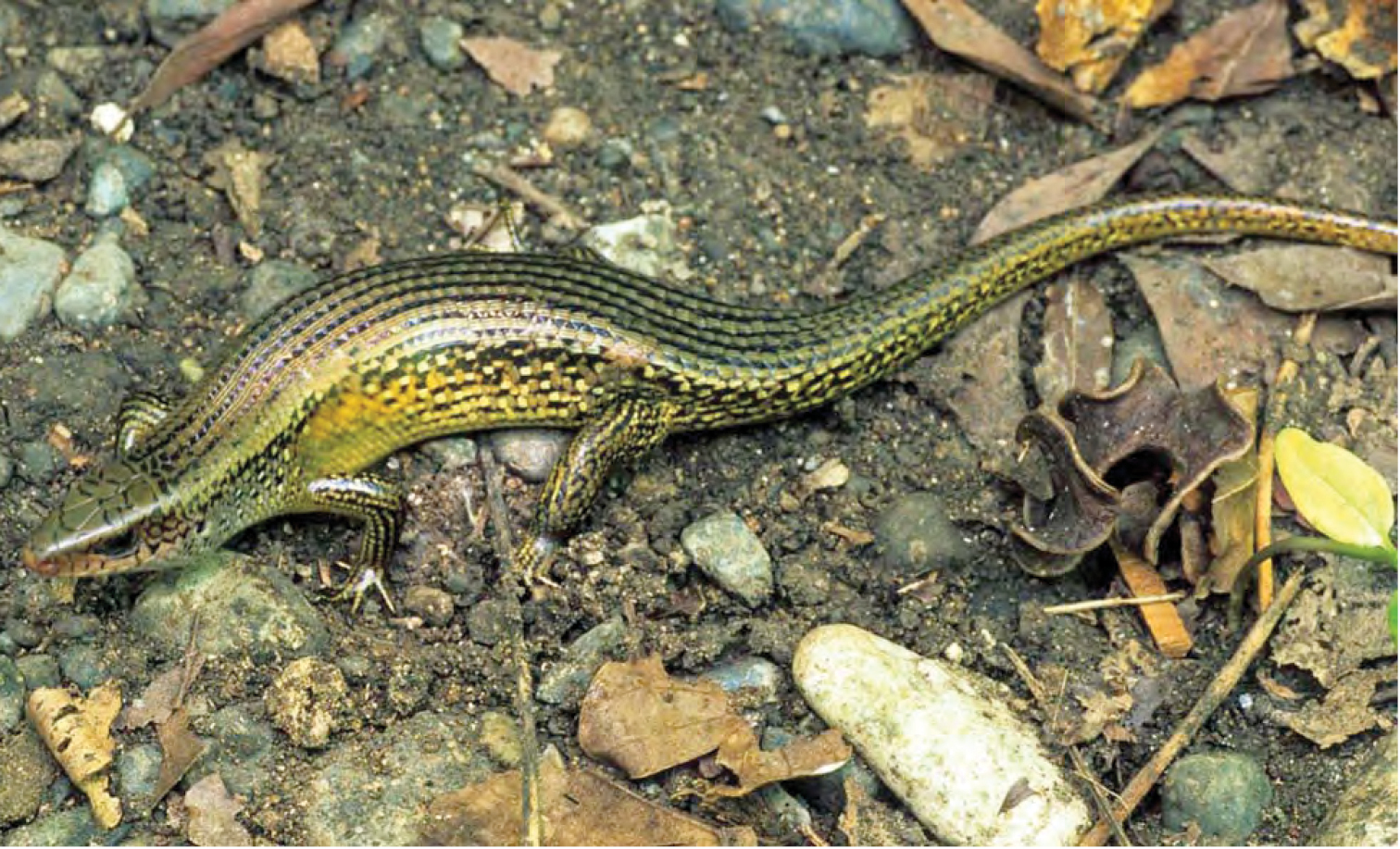
- Many-striped Skink (Eutropis multifasciata)

Scientific classification
- Kingdom: Animalia
- Phylum: Chordata
- Class: Reptilia
- Order: Squamata
- Family: Scincidae
- Subfamily: Mabuyinae; Mittleman, 1952

Genera
- See text

= Mabuyinae =

Mabuyinae Temporal range: Miocene - Present

Subfamily of skinks

Mabuyinae is a subfamily of lizards, commonly known as skinks, within the family Scincidae. The genera in this subfamily were previously found to belong the Mabuya group in the large subfamily Lygosominae.

They have a pantropical distribution, being found throughout the tropics of Asia, Africa, and the Americas (but excluding most of Australasia aside from Eutropis multifasciata, found in New Guinea). Although originating in and having most species in the Old World, they managed to colonize the Americas in the Miocene; the common ancestor of the American genera is thought to have rafted across the Atlantic from Africa to South America about 18 million years ago, with the skinks diversifying across the Americas and evolving into many new genera.

Six genera (Alinea, Capitellum, Copeoglossum, Mabuya, Marisora, Spondylurus) are found in the Caribbean (with Alinea, Capitellum, Mabuya, and Spondylurus being exclusively Caribbean genera, while Marisora and Copeoglossum have both mainland American and insular Caribbean species), and are thought to each represent independent dispersals from the American mainland within the past 10 million years. Two of these, Alinea and Capitellum, are feared to be extinct as none of their species have been seen in the past few decades; in addition, numerous other Caribbean species in the genera Mabuya, Spondylurus, and Copeoglossum are feared to have gone extinct. Most of these extinctions are due to the small Indian mongoose (Urva auropunctata), which was introduced to the islands in the 19th century.

== Genera ==
The subfamily Mabuyinae contains 25 genera.

- Alinea (2 species) (possibly extinct)
- Aspronema (2 species)
- Brasiliscincus (3 species)
- Capitellum (3 species) (possibly extinct)
- Chioninia (7 species)
- Copeoglossum (5 species)
- Dasia (10 species)
- Eumecia (2 species)
- Eutropis (48 species)
- Exila (1 species)
- Heremites (3 species)
- Lubuya (1 species)
- Mabuya (9 species)
- Manciola (1 species)
- Maracaiba (2 species)
- Marisora (13 species)
- Notomabuya (1 species)
- Otosaurus (1 species)
- Panopa (2 species)
- Psychosaura (2 species)
- Spondylurus (17 species)
- Toenayar (1 species)
- Trachylepis (87 species)
- Varzea (2 species)
- Vietnascincus (1 species)
