= A. vanzolinii =

A. vanzolinii may refer to:

- Alpaida vanzolinii, Levi, 1988, a spider species in the genus Alpaida and the family Araneidae found in Peru, Brazil and Argentina
- Alsodes vanzolinii, a frog species endemic to Chile
- Amphisbaena vanzolinii, a worm lizard species found in Brazil
- Anolis vanzolinii, a lizard species in the genus Anolis

== See also ==
- Vanzolinii (disambiguation)
