= Trachylepis hemmingi =

Conservation status
- Least Concern (IUCN 3.1)

Scientific classification
- Kingdom: Animalia
- Phylum: Chordata
- Class: Reptilia
- Order: Squamata
- Family: Scincidae
- Genus: Trachylepis
- Species: T. hemmingi

Binomial name
- Trachylepis hemmingi (Gans, Laurent, & Pandit, 1965)

Synonyms
- Mabuya hemmingi Gans, Laurent & Pandit, 1965; Euprepis hemmingi — Mausfeld et al., 2002; Trachylepis hemmingi — Bauer, 2003

Species of lizard

Trachylepis hemmingi, also known commonly as the Somali mabuya, is a species of skink, a lizard in the subfamily Mabuyinae of the family Scincidae. The species is endemic to Somalia.

== Etymology ==
The specific name, hemmingi, is in honor of English entomologist Christopher Francis Hemming, who collected the holotype.

== Reproduction ==
The mode of reproduction of T. hemmingi is unknown.
