= A. frontalis =

A. frontalis may refer to:

- Amphisbaena frontalis, Vanzolini, 1991, a worm lizard species in the genus Amphisbaena
- Anarhynchus frontalis, the wrybill, a species of plover endemic to New Zealand
- Aranea frontalis, a synonym for Evarcha arcuata, a jumping spider species
- Atelerix frontalis, the Southern African hedgehog, a species of mammal found in Angola and Botswana
- Avatha frontalis, a synonym for Avatha discolor, a moth species
- The frontal artery, arteria frontalis, a branch of the ophthalmic artery.

== See also ==
- Frontalis (disambiguation)
