= Elapomorphus =

Scientific classification
- Kingdom: Animalia
- Phylum: Chordata
- Class: Reptilia
- Order: Squamata
- Suborder: Serpentes
- Family: Colubridae
- Subfamily: Dipsadinae
- Genus: Elapomorphus; Wiegmann in Fitzinger, 1843

Genus of snakes

Elapomorphus is a genus of venomous snakes of the family Colubridae. The genus is endemic to Brazil.

== Species ==
The genus Elapomorphus contains two species. -

- Elapomorphus quinquelineatus (Raddi, 1820) - Raddi's lizard-eating snake
- Elapomorphus wuchereri Günther, 1861 - Wucherer's lizard-eating snake

Nota bene: A binomial authority in parentheses indicates that the species was originally described in a genus other than Elapomorphus.

== Etymology ==
The specific name, wuchereri, is in honor of Portuguese-born German-Brazilian herpetologist Otto Edward Henry Wucherer.
