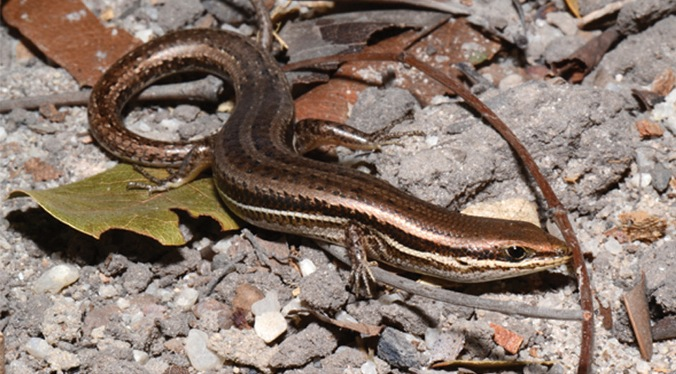
- Brasiliscincus heathi

Scientific classification
- Kingdom: Animalia
- Phylum: Chordata
- Class: Reptilia
- Order: Squamata
- Family: Scincidae
- Subfamily: Mabuyinae
- Genus: Brasiliscincus; Hedges & Conn, 2012

Species
- Three species, see text

= Brasiliscincus =

Genus of lizards

Brasiliscincus is a genus of skinks, lizards in the family Scincidae. All species in the genus Brasiliscincus are endemic to Brazil and were previously placed in the genus Mabuya.

== Species ==
The following three species, listed alphabetically by specific name, are recognized as being valid:

- Brasiliscincus agilis (Raddi, 1823)
- Brasiliscincus caissara (Rebouças-Spieker, 1974)
- Brasiliscincus heathi (Schmidt & Inger, 1951) – Brazilian mabuya

Nota bene: A binomial authority in parentheses indicates that the species was originally described in a genus other than Brasiliscincus.
