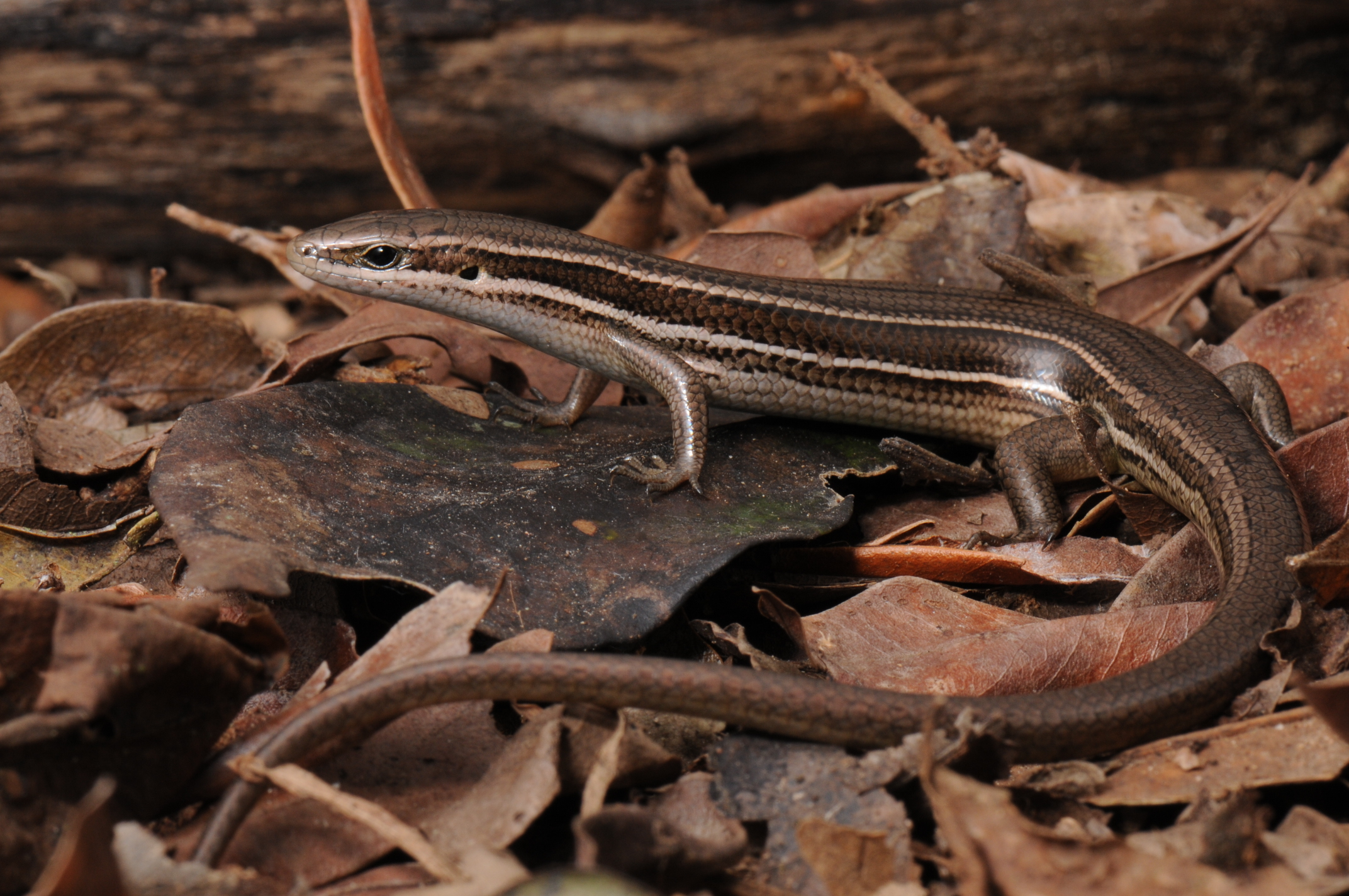
- Paraguay mabuya (Aspronema dorsivittatum)

Scientific classification
- Kingdom: Animalia
- Phylum: Chordata
- Class: Reptilia
- Order: Squamata
- Family: Scincidae
- Subfamily: Mabuyinae
- Genus: Aspronema; Hedges & Conn, 2012

Species
- 2 sp., see text

= Aspronema =

Genus of lizards

Aspronema is a genus of skinks.

== Species ==
The following 2 species, listed alphabetically by specific name, are recognized as being valid:

- Aspronema cochabambae (Dunn, 1935)
- Aspronema dorsivittatum (Cope, 1862) – Paraguay mabuya

Nota bene: A binomial authority in parentheses indicates that the species was originally described in a genus other than Aspronema. Both species are found in South America. Both species were previously placed in the genus Mabuya.
