= Neglected worm lizard =

Conservation status
- Data Deficient (IUCN 3.1)

Scientific classification
- Kingdom: Animalia
- Phylum: Chordata
- Class: Reptilia
- Order: Squamata
- Suborder: Lacertoidea
- Clade: Amphisbaenia
- Family: Amphisbaenidae
- Genus: Amphisbaena
- Species: A. neglecta

Binomial name
- Amphisbaena neglecta Dunn & Piatt, 1936
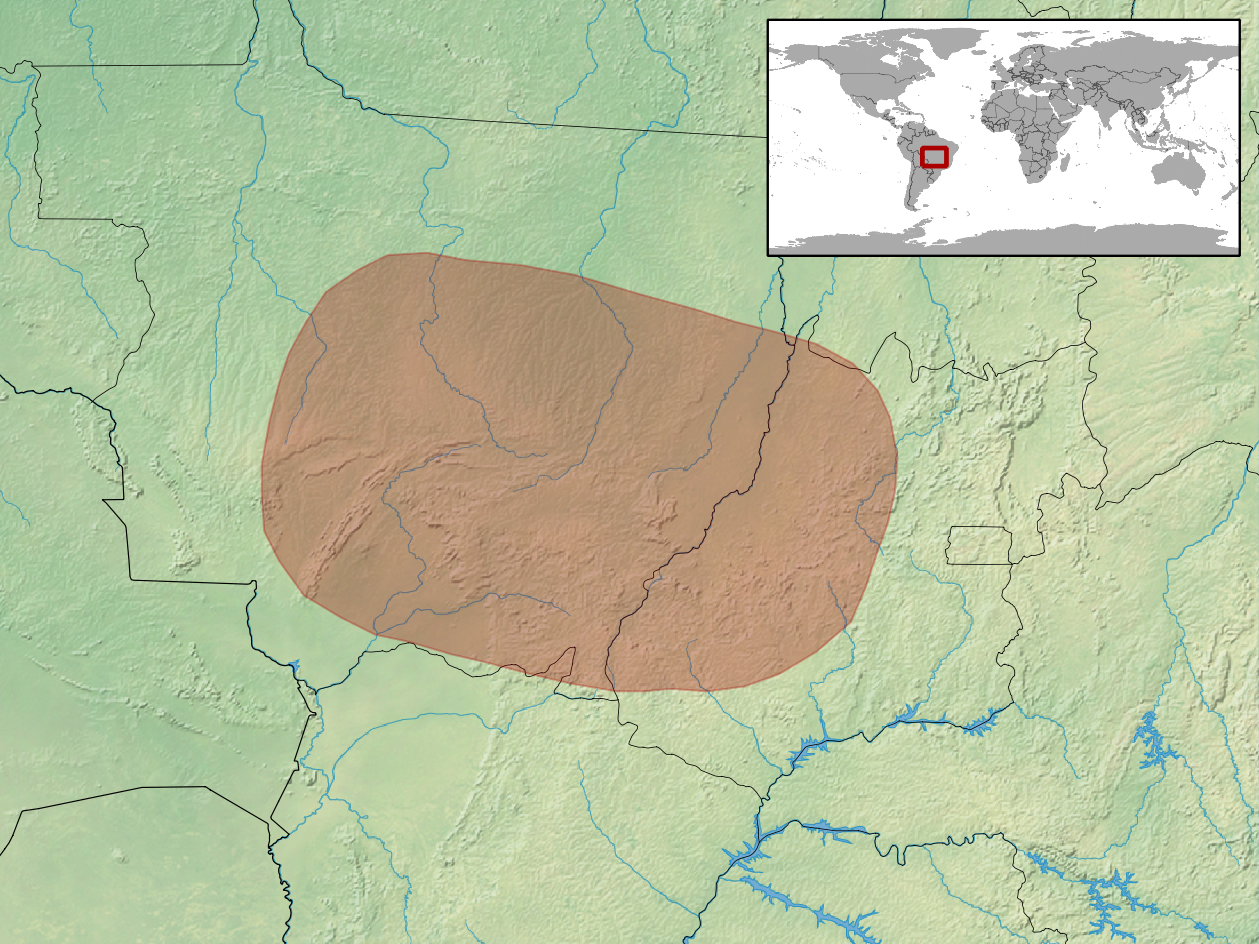

Species of lizard

The neglected worm lizard (Amphisbaena neglecta) is a worm lizard species in the genus Amphisbaena. It is endemic to Brazil.

== Geographic range ==
It is found in the Central-West Region, Brazil.

== Status ==
The species is only known from the first specimen collected and has likely been threatened by a reservoir constructed for hydroelectric power, however extensive searches have not located this species. Chapada dos Guimarães National Park is next to the reservoir, so the worm lizard may be protected and also threatened.

== See also ==
- List of reptiles of Brazil
