= Silvestri's worm lizard =

Conservation status
- Least Concern (IUCN 3.1)

Scientific classification
- Kingdom: Animalia
- Phylum: Chordata
- Class: Reptilia
- Order: Squamata
- Clade: Amphisbaenia
- Family: Amphisbaenidae
- Genus: Amphisbaena
- Species: A. silvestrii

Binomial name
- Amphisbaena silvestrii Boulenger, 1902

Species of lizard

Silvestri's worm lizard (Amphisbaena silvestrii) is a species of worm lizard in the family Amphisbaenidae. The species is endemic to South America.

== Etymology ==
The specific name, silvestrii, is in honor of Italian entomologist Filippo Silvestri.

== Geographic range ==
A. silvestrii is found in Bolivia (department of Santa Cruz), and also in Brazil (state of Mato Grosso).

== Habitat ==
The preferred natural habitats of A. silvestrii are forest and savanna.

== Description ==
A. silvestrii has two precloacal pores, a character present in only about 20% of species of Amphisbaena.

== Reproduction ==
A. silvestrii is oviparous.

== See also ==
- List of reptiles of Brazil
