= Procellosaurinus =

Scientific classification
- Kingdom: Animalia
- Phylum: Chordata
- Class: Reptilia
- Order: Squamata
- Family: Gymnophthalmidae
- Tribe: Gymnophthalmini
- Genus: Procellosaurinus; Rodrigues, 1991

Genus of lizards

Procellosaurinus is a genus of lizards in the family Gymnophthalmidae. They are endemic to Brazil.

== Species ==
- Procellosaurinus erythrocercus Rodrigues, 1991 – Rodrigues's red teiid
- Procellosaurinus tetradactylus Rodrigues, 1991 – Rodrigues's four-fingered teiid
