= Vietnascincus =

Conservation status
- Data Deficient (IUCN 3.1)

Scientific classification
- Kingdom: Animalia
- Phylum: Chordata
- Class: Reptilia
- Order: Squamata
- Family: Scincidae
- Subfamily: Mabuyinae
- Genus: Vietnascincus; Darevsky & Orlov, 1994
- Species: V. rugosus

Binomial name
- Vietnascincus rugosus Darevsky & Orlov, 1994

Genus of lizards

Vietnascincus is a genus of skinks. It contains one species, Vietnascincus rugosus, which is endemic to Vietnam.
