= Carvalho worm lizard =

Conservation status
- Endangered (IUCN 3.1)

Scientific classification
- Kingdom: Animalia
- Phylum: Chordata
- Class: Reptilia
- Order: Squamata
- Clade: Amphisbaenia
- Family: Amphisbaenidae
- Genus: Amphisbaena
- Species: A. carvalhoi

Binomial name
- Amphisbaena carvalhoi Gans, 1965

Species of amphisbaenian

The Carvalho worm lizard (Amphisbaena carvalhoi), also known commonly as Carvalho's worm lizard, is a species of worm lizard in the family Amphisbaenidae. The species is endemic to Brazil.

== Etymology ==
The specific name, carvalhoi, is in honor of Brazilian herpetologist Antenor Leitão de Carvalho, who collected the type specimen.

== Geographic range ==
A. carvalhoi is found in northeastern Brazil in the state of Pernambuco.

== Habitat ==
The preferred natural habitat of A. carvalhoi is shrubland. The holotype of A. carvalhoi was collected at an altitude of 1,035 m (3,396 ft).

== Description ==
A. carvalhoi may attain a total length (including tail) of 24.5 cm (9.6 in).

== Reproduction ==
A. carvalhoi is oviparous.

== See also ==
- List of reptiles of Brazil
