= Aspronema cochabambae =

Conservation status
- Vulnerable (IUCN 3.1)

Scientific classification
- Kingdom: Animalia
- Phylum: Chordata
- Class: Reptilia
- Order: Squamata
- Suborder: Scinciformata
- Infraorder: Scincomorpha
- Family: Mabuyidae
- Genus: Aspronema
- Species: A. cochabambae

Binomial name
- Aspronema cochabambae (Dunn, 1935)

Species of lizard

Aspronema cochabambae is a species of skink found in Bolivia and Argentina.
