= Psychosaura =

Scientific classification
- Kingdom: Animalia
- Phylum: Chordata
- Class: Reptilia
- Order: Squamata
- Family: Scincidae
- Subfamily: Mabuyinae
- Genus: Psychosaura; Hedges & Conn, 2012

Species
- 2 sp., see text

Genus of lizards

Psychosaura is a genus of skinks. Both species are endemic to Brazil.

== Species ==
The following 2 species, listed alphabetically by specific name, are recognized as being valid:

- Psychosaura agmosticha (Rodrigues, 2000)
- Psychosaura macrorhyncha (Hoge, 1946) – Hoge's mabuya

Nota bene: A binomial authority in parentheses indicates that the species was originally described in a genus other than Psychosaura.
