= Heath's worm lizard =

Conservation status
- Near Threatened (IUCN 3.1)

Scientific classification
- Kingdom: Animalia
- Phylum: Chordata
- Class: Reptilia
- Order: Squamata
- Clade: Amphisbaenia
- Family: Amphisbaenidae
- Genus: Amphisbaena
- Species: A. heathi

Binomial name
- Amphisbaena heathi K.P. Schmidt, 1936

Species of lizard

Heath's worm lizard (Amphisbaena heathi) is a species of amphisbaenian in the family Amphisbaenidae. The species is endemic to Brazil, in the state of Rio Grande do Norte.

== Etymology ==
The specific name, heathi, is in honor of American malacologist Harold Heath.

== Diet ==
A. heathi feeds mainly on termites, ants, insect larvae, and cockroach nymphs, but will also eat earthworms, leeches, and centipedes.

== Reproduction ==
A. heathi is oviparous. Eggs are laid during the dry season.

== See also ==
- List of reptiles of Brazil
