= Anaxibia (spider) =

Scientific classification
- Domain: Eukaryota
- Kingdom: Animalia
- Phylum: Arthropoda
- Subphylum: Chelicerata
- Class: Arachnida
- Order: Araneae
- Infraorder: Araneomorphae
- Family: Dictynidae
- Genus: Anaxibia; Thorell, 1898

Type species
- A. caudiculata Thorell, 1898

Species
- 7, see text

Genus of spiders

Anaxibia is a genus of cribellate araneomorph spiders in the family Dictynidae, and was first described by Tamerlan Thorell in 1898.

== Species ==
As of May 2019 it contains seven species restricted to Asia and parts of Africa:

- Anaxibia caudiculata Thorell, 1898 (type) – Myanmar
- Anaxibia difficilis (Kraus, 1960) – São Tomé and Príncipe
- Anaxibia folia Sankaran & Sebastian, 2017 – India
- Anaxibia nigricauda (Simon, 1905) – Sri Lanka
- Anaxibia peteri (Lessert, 1933) – Angola
- Anaxibia pictithorax (Kulczyński, 1908) – Indonesia (Java)
- Anaxibia rebai (Tikader, 1966) – India (mainland, Andaman Is.)
