= Anolis pseudotigrinus =

Scientific classification
- Kingdom: Animalia
- Phylum: Chordata
- Class: Reptilia
- Order: Squamata
- Suborder: Iguania
- Family: Anolidae
- Genus: Anolis
- Species: A. pseudotigrinus

Binomial name
- Anolis pseudotigrinus Amaral, 1933

Species of lizard

Anolis pseudotigrinus, the false tiger anole, is a species of lizard in the family Dactyloidae. The species is found in Brazil.
