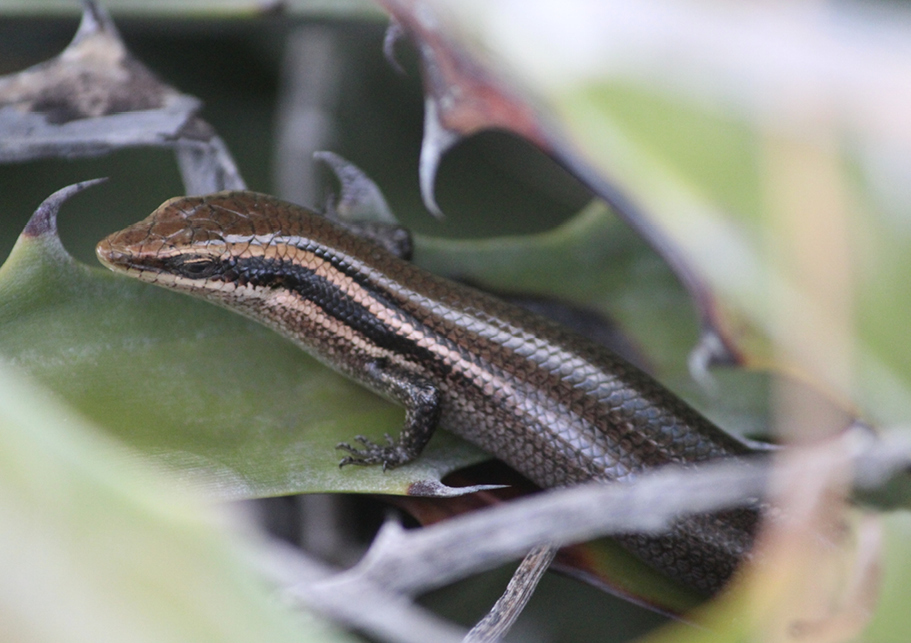

Conservation status
- Least Concern (IUCN 3.1)

Scientific classification
- Kingdom: Animalia
- Phylum: Chordata
- Class: Reptilia
- Order: Squamata
- Suborder: Scinciformata
- Infraorder: Scincomorpha
- Family: Mabuyidae
- Genus: Psychosaura
- Species: P. agmosticha

Binomial name
- Psychosaura agmosticha (Rodrigues, 2000)

= Psychosaura agmosticha =

Species of lizard

Psychosaura agmosticha is a species of skink found in Brazil.
