= Psychosaura macrorhyncha =

Conservation status
- Least Concern (IUCN 3.1)

Scientific classification
- Kingdom: Animalia
- Phylum: Chordata
- Class: Reptilia
- Order: Squamata
- Family: Scincidae
- Genus: Psychosaura
- Species: P. macrorhyncha

Binomial name
- Psychosaura macrorhyncha (Hoge, 1946)

Species of lizard

Hoge's mabuya (Psychosaura macrorhyncha) is a species of skink found in Brazil.
