= Anolis nasofrontalis =

Scientific classification
- Kingdom: Animalia
- Phylum: Chordata
- Class: Reptilia
- Order: Squamata
- Suborder: Iguania
- Family: Anolidae
- Genus: Anolis
- Species: A. nasofrontalis

Binomial name
- Anolis nasofrontalis Amaral, 1933

Species of lizard

Anolis nasofrontalis, the nose anole, is a species of lizard in the family Dactyloidae. The species is found in Brazil.
