= Amphisbaena talisiae =

Scientific classification
- Domain: Eukaryota
- Kingdom: Animalia
- Phylum: Chordata
- Class: Reptilia
- Order: Squamata
- Clade: Amphisbaenia
- Family: Amphisbaenidae
- Genus: Amphisbaena
- Species: A. talisiae

Binomial name
- Amphisbaena talisiae Vanzolini, 1995

Species of lizard

Amphisbaena talisiae is a species of worm lizard found in Brazil.
