= Elapomorphus wuchereri =

Conservation status
- Least Concern (IUCN 3.1)

Scientific classification
- Kingdom: Animalia
- Phylum: Chordata
- Class: Reptilia
- Order: Squamata
- Suborder: Serpentes
- Family: Colubridae
- Genus: Elapomorphus
- Species: E. wuchereri

Binomial name
- Elapomorphus wuchereri (Günther, 1861)

Species of snake

Elapomorphus wuchereri, Wucherer's lizard-eating snake, is a species of snake of the family Colubridae. The species is found in Brazil.
