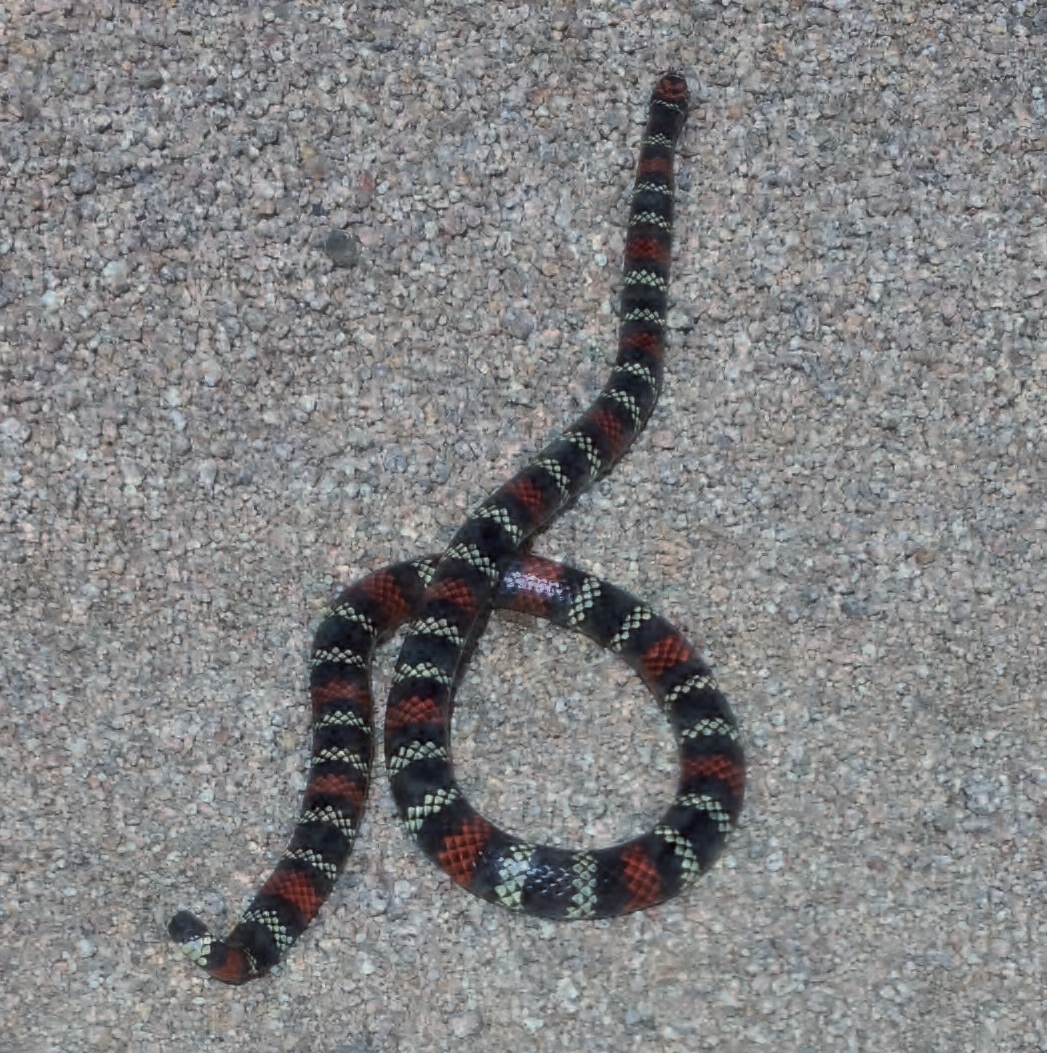
- Micrurus altirostris in defensive posture, with its tail bent upward simulating its head

Conservation status
- Least Concern (IUCN 3.1)

Scientific classification
- Kingdom: Animalia
- Phylum: Chordata
- Class: Reptilia
- Order: Squamata
- Suborder: Serpentes
- Family: Elapidae
- Genus: Micrurus
- Species: M. altirostris

Binomial name
- Micrurus altirostris (Cope, 1860)
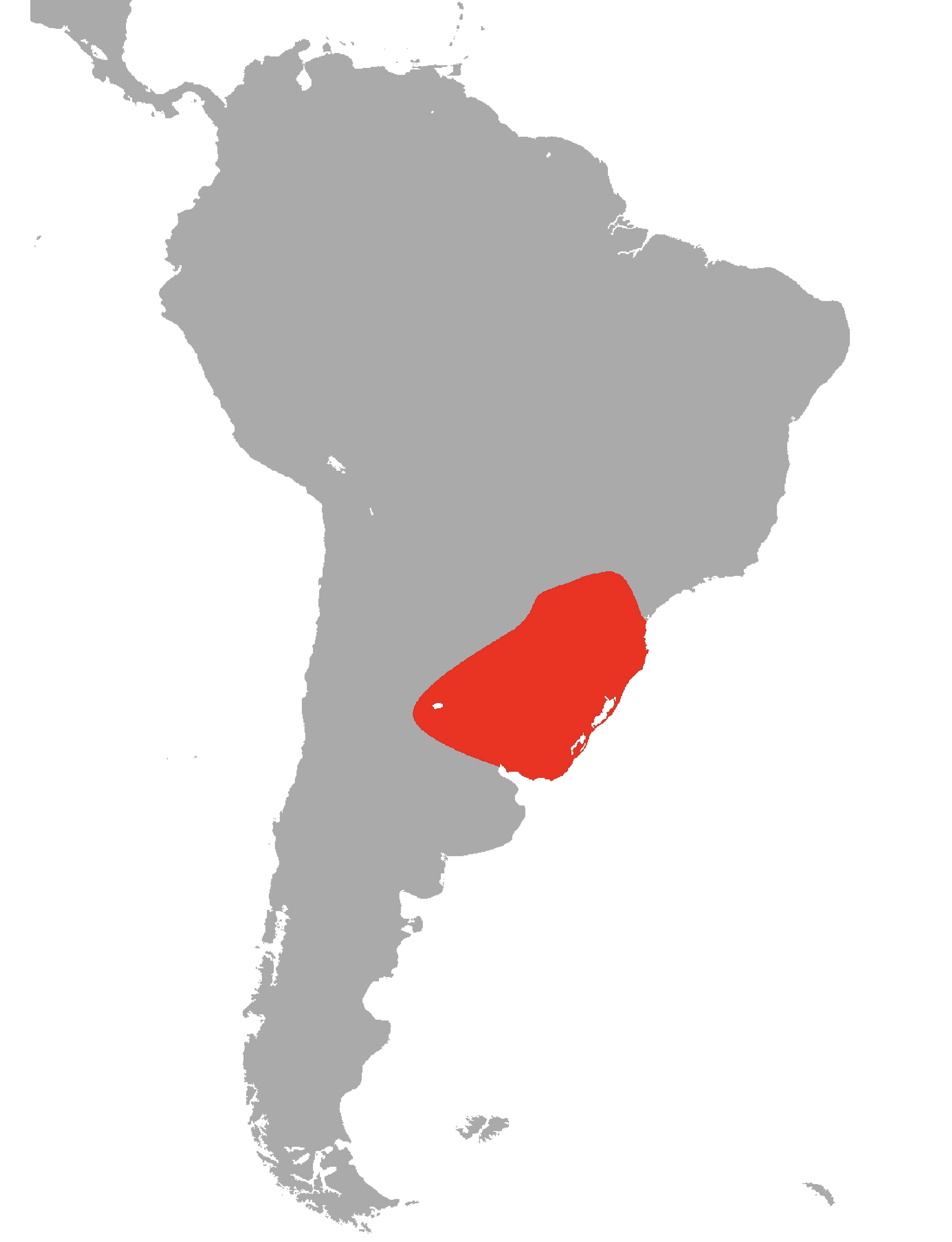

Synonyms
- Elaps altirostris Cope, 1860; Micrurus frontalis altirostris (Cope, 1860); Elaps heterochilus Mocquard, 1887

= Micrurus altirostris =

Species of snake

Micrurus altirostris, also known commonly as the Uruguayan coral snake, is a species of venomous snake in the family Elapidae. The species is native to southeastern South America.

== Geographic distribution ==
Micrurus altirostris is found in northeastern Argentina, extreme southern Brazil, eastern Paraguay, and Uruguay.

== Habitat ==
The preferred natural habitat of Micrurus altirostris is forest, but it is also found less abundantly in savanna and grassland. Its altitudinal range is from near sea level to around 400 m (1,300 ft).

== Behavior ==
Micrurus altirostris is terrestrial, foraging in plant litter.

== Diet ==
Micrurus altirostris preys upon amphisbaenians and snakes.

== Reproduction ==
Micrurus altirostris is oviparous.

== Venom ==
Micrurus altirostris possesses a potent venom. The estimated lethal dose is 5–7 mg for an adult human. When live specimens were "milked" in a laboratory, the average venom yield was 8–10 mg.
