= Black-headed worm lizard =

Scientific classification
- Domain: Eukaryota
- Kingdom: Animalia
- Phylum: Chordata
- Class: Reptilia
- Order: Squamata
- Clade: Amphisbaenia
- Family: Amphisbaenidae
- Genus: Amphisbaena
- Species: A. nigricauda

Binomial name
- Amphisbaena nigricauda Gans, 1966

Species of lizard

The black-headed worm lizard (Amphisbaena nigricauda) is a species of worm lizard endemic to Brazil.

== Etymology ==
The specific name, nigricauda, is Latin for "black tail".

== Geographic range ==
It is found in the Southeast Region of Brazil in the Brazilian state of Espírito Santo.

== See also ==
- List of reptiles of Brazil
