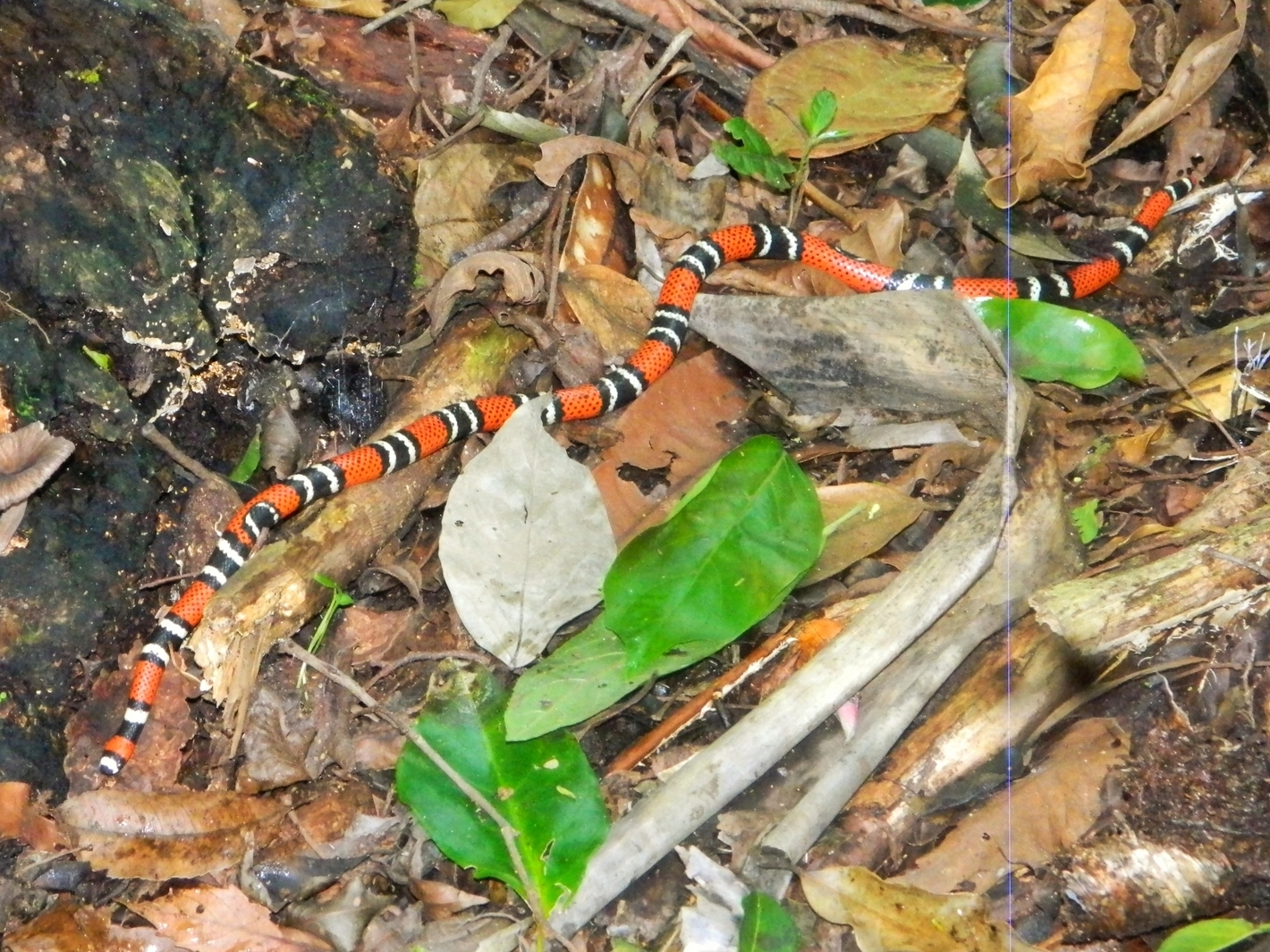

Conservation status
- Least Concern (IUCN 3.1)

Scientific classification
- Kingdom: Animalia
- Phylum: Chordata
- Class: Reptilia
- Order: Squamata
- Suborder: Serpentes
- Family: Elapidae
- Genus: Micrurus
- Species: M. decoratus

Binomial name
- Micrurus decoratus (Jan, 1858)
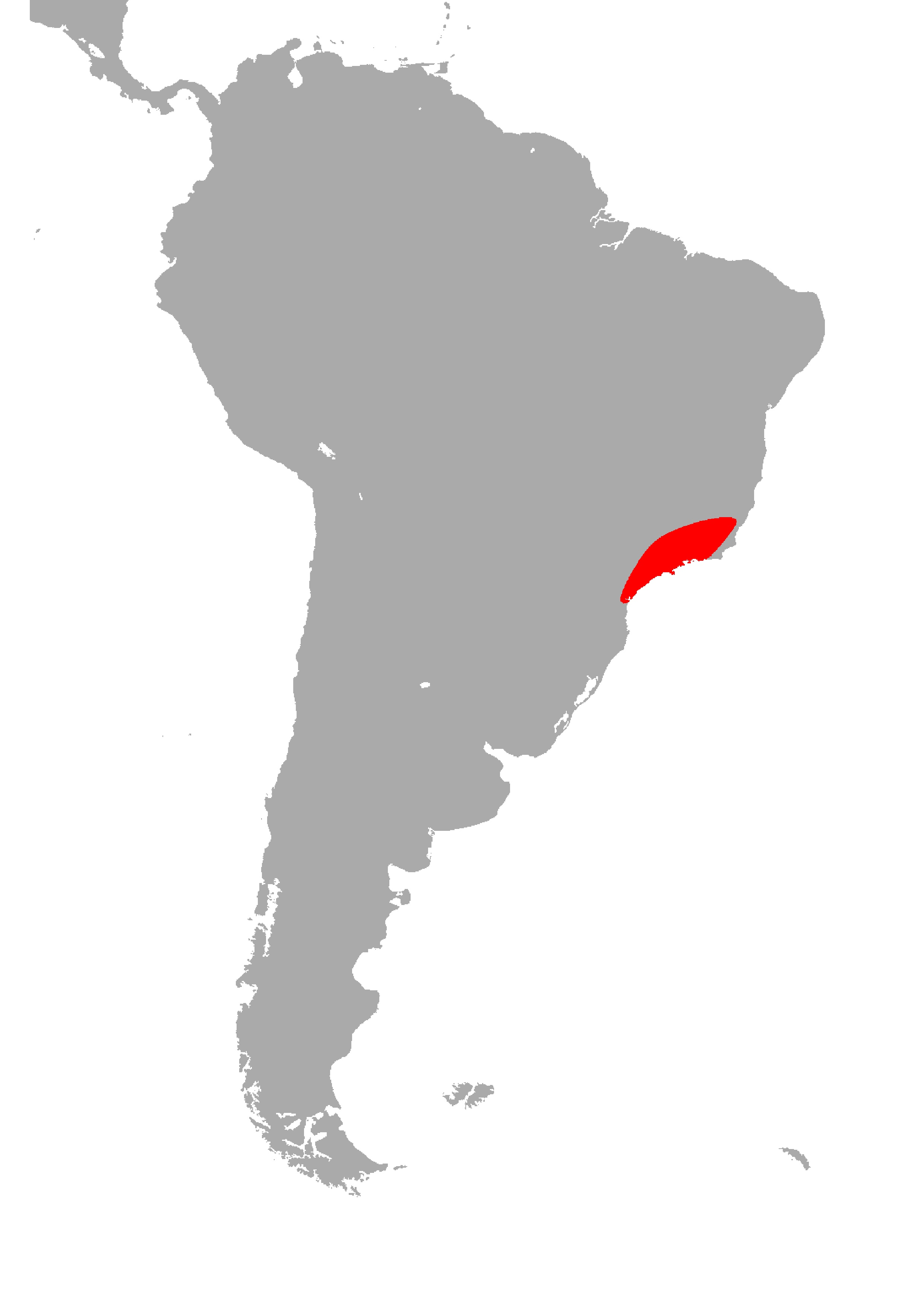

Synonyms
- Elaps decoratus Jan, 1858; Elaps fischeri Amaral, 1921; Elaps ezequieli A. Lutz & Mello, 1922

= Brazilian coral snake =

Species of snake

The Brazilian coral snake (Micrurus decoratus), also commonly referred to as the decorated coral snake, and cobra coral decorada in Brazilian Portuguese, is a species of venomous snake in the family Elapidae. The species is native to the Atlantic Forest of southeastern Brazil.

== Description ==
Micrurus decoratus has an alternating color pattern containing red, white and black. It has a triad color pattern with an external ring pattern that can vary among individuals. It is characterized by having black and white rings organized into 13–19 body triads. The black rings are narrower than the red; and the first triad, at the neck, is incomplete. The black central ring of each triad is typically the widest. The vivid color pattern is used to get the attention of predators, serving as a warning signal to indicate its venomous nature.

Males have 195–208 ventrals and 19–22 subcaudals, and females have 209–218 ventrals and 16–19 subcaudals.

The average total length (tail-included) of this species is around 67 cm (26 in). Like all elapids, it has proteroglyphous ("front-fanged") dentition and a round pupil.

== Biology ==
=== Behavior ===
Micrurus decoratus is terrestrial and fossorial, foraging underground and in leaf litter.

=== Defensive behavior ===
Micrurus decoratus and other Micrurus species possess similar defensive behaviors. The color pattern is used as the first warning signal that it is dangerous. If the predator continues, the snake displays defensive moves such as tail exhibition and dorso-ventral body flattening. Tail behaviors could include moving it back and forth to try and deter the predator. Dorso-ventral body flattening is a behavior in which the snake will flatten its body from top to bottom to make itself as flat and wide as possible. This gives the appearance that it is larger than it actually is, again as a defensive mechanism to intimidate a predator.

=== Diet ===
Typically coral snakes of the genus Micrurus feed on elongated vertebrates such as caecilians, amphisbaenians, legless lizards, and snakes. Due to the geographic distribution of Micrurus decoratus being restricted to the Atlantic Forest of southeastern and southern Brazil, it was found to typically only prey on caecilians and amphisbaenians.

=== Reproduction ===
Micrurus decoratus is oviparous.
