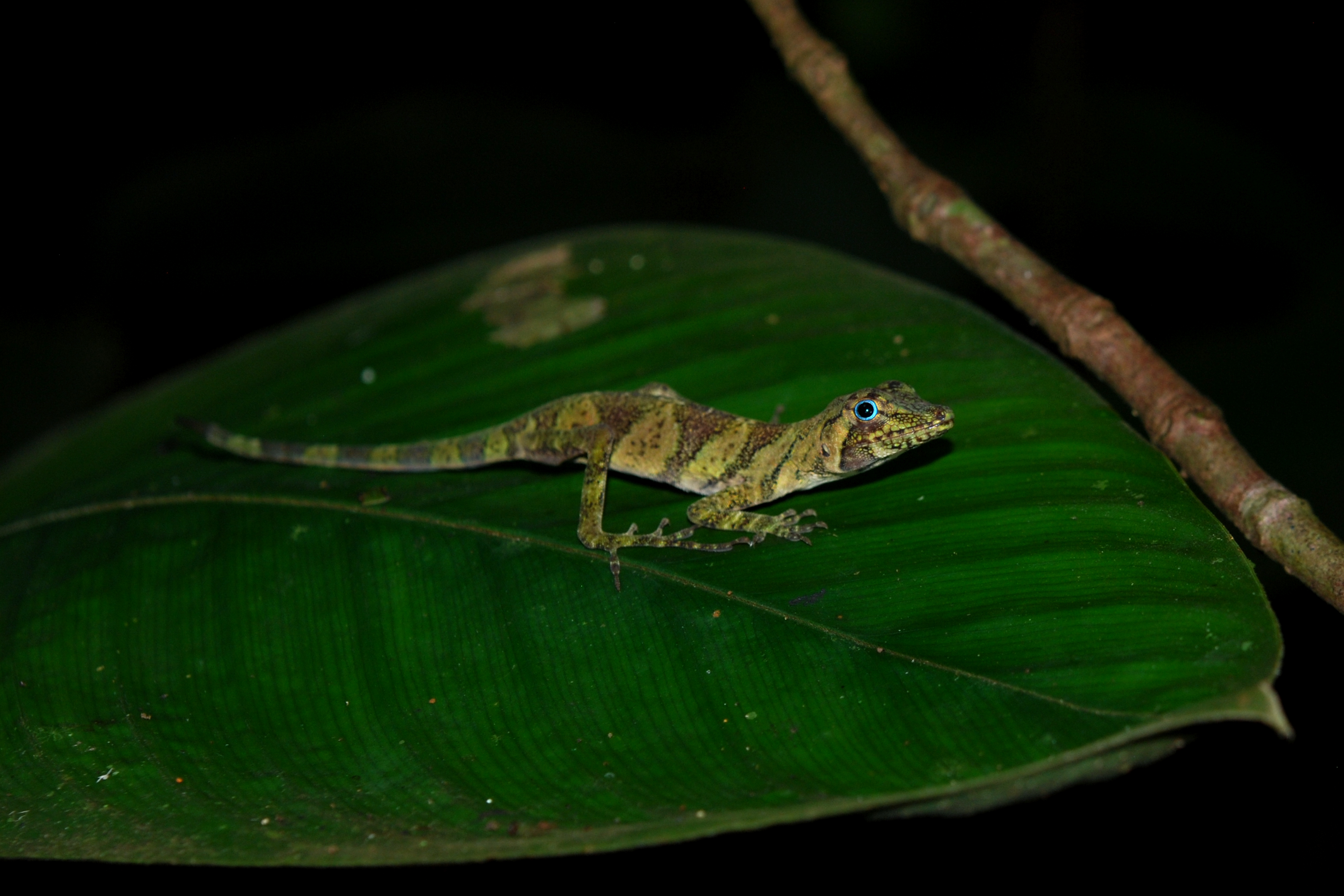

Conservation status
- Least Concern (IUCN 3.1)

Scientific classification
- Kingdom: Animalia
- Phylum: Chordata
- Class: Reptilia
- Order: Squamata
- Suborder: Iguania
- Family: Dactyloidae
- Genus: Anolis
- Species: A. transversalis

Binomial name
- Anolis transversalis Duméril, 1851

= Anolis transversalis =

Species of lizard

Anolis transversalis, the banded tree anole or transverse anole, is a species of lizard in the family Dactyloidae. The species is found in Venezuela, Ecuador, Peru, Colombia, Brazil, and Bolivia.
