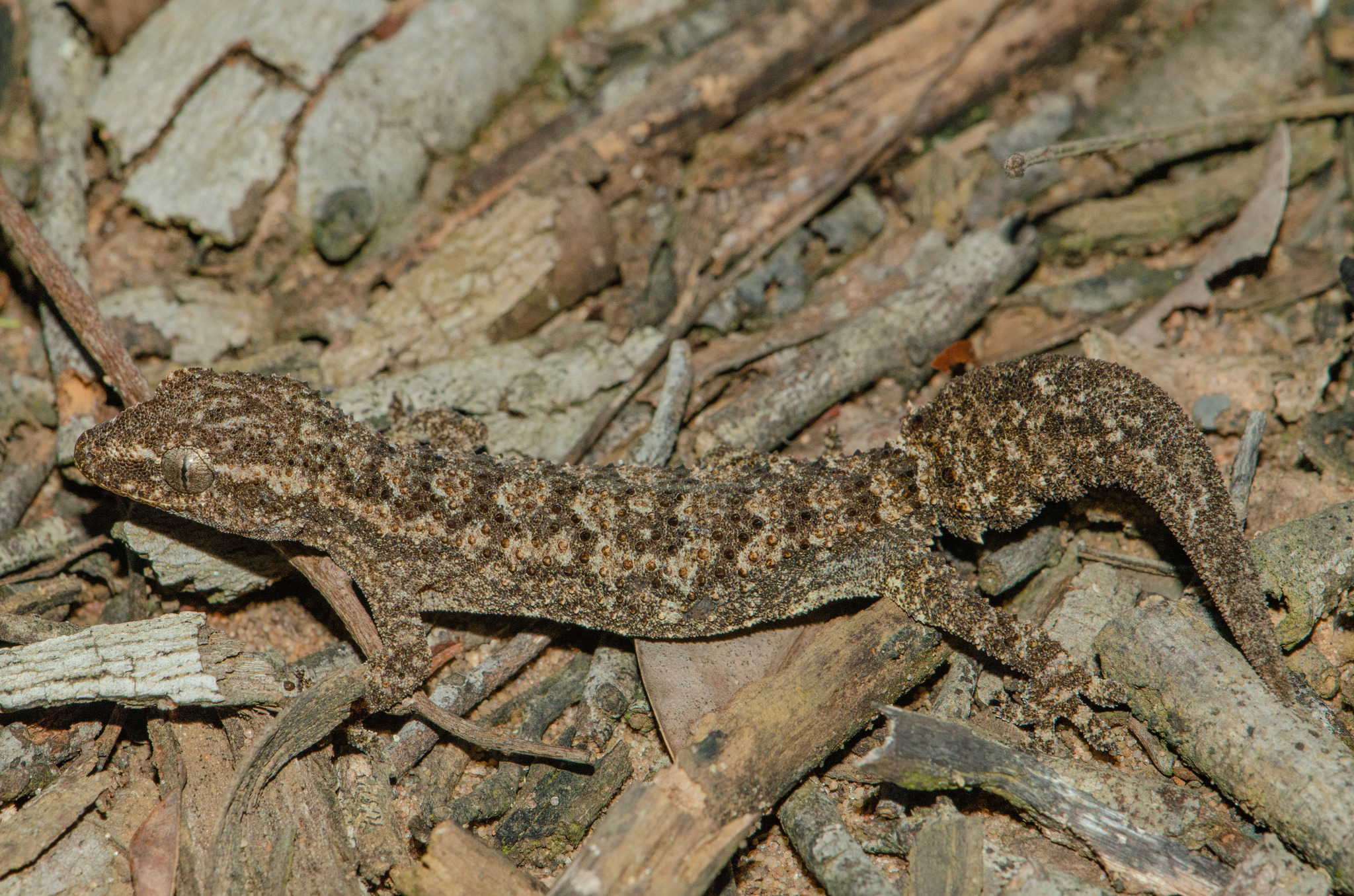

Conservation status
- Least Concern (IUCN 3.1)

Scientific classification
- Kingdom: Animalia
- Phylum: Chordata
- Class: Reptilia
- Order: Squamata
- Suborder: Gekkota
- Family: Gekkonidae
- Genus: Hemidactylus
- Species: H. brasilianus

Binomial name
- Hemidactylus brasilianus (Amaral, 1935)

Synonyms
- Briba brasiliana Amaral, 1935

= Amaral's Brazilian gecko =

Species of lizard

Amaral's Brazilian gecko (Hemidactylus brasilianus) is a species of nocturnal gecko, a lizard in the family Gekkonidae. The species is native to the arid Jalapão region in the Brazilian states of Bahia and Minas Gerais.

== Description ==
Hemidactylus brasilianus is a bluish-gray, oviparous, tree-dwelling species, which feeds on herbivorous insects and other invertebrates. It has immovable (fixed) eyelids. Being nocturnal, it has vertically oriented pupils. It has a life span of about 6–13 years, and is sexually mature at 6–9 months. It is about 13 cm (5.1 in) long (tail included), and about 2 cm (0.79 in) wide.

== Behavior ==
Hemidactylus brasilianus cannot change its colour. When attacked by a bird, it runs in circles, confusing the predator. When attacked by a ground animal, it climbs a high tree, runs in tall grass, or tries to hide under leaves, rocks, and other things it can find.
