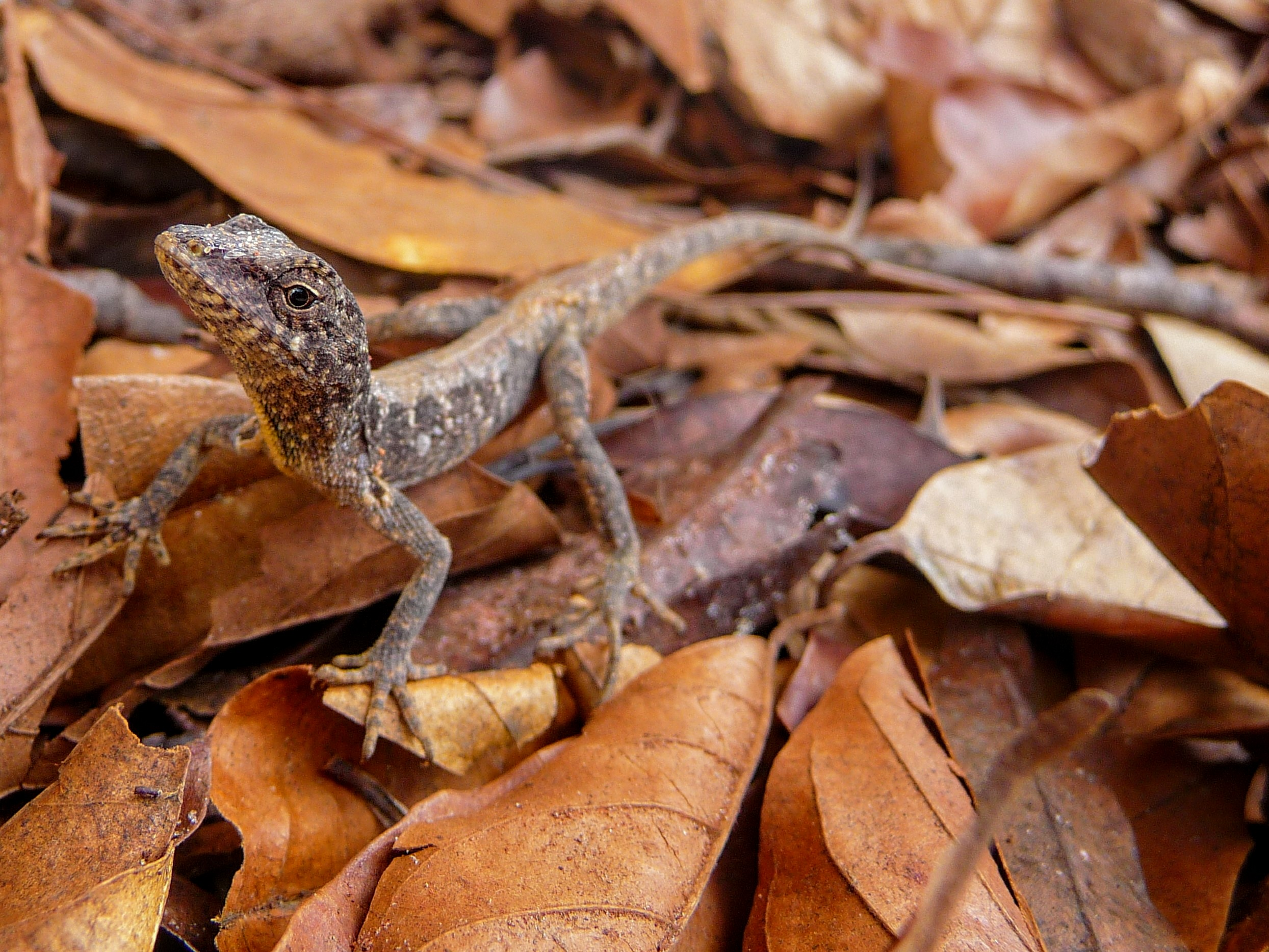

Conservation status
- Least Concern (IUCN 3.1)

Scientific classification
- Kingdom: Animalia
- Phylum: Chordata
- Class: Reptilia
- Order: Squamata
- Suborder: Iguania
- Family: Dactyloidae
- Genus: Anolis
- Species: A. meridionalis

Binomial name
- Anolis meridionalis Boettger, 1885

= Anolis meridionalis =

Species of lizard

Anolis meridionalis is a species of lizard in the family Dactyloidae. The species is found in Brazil, Paraguay, and Bolivia.
