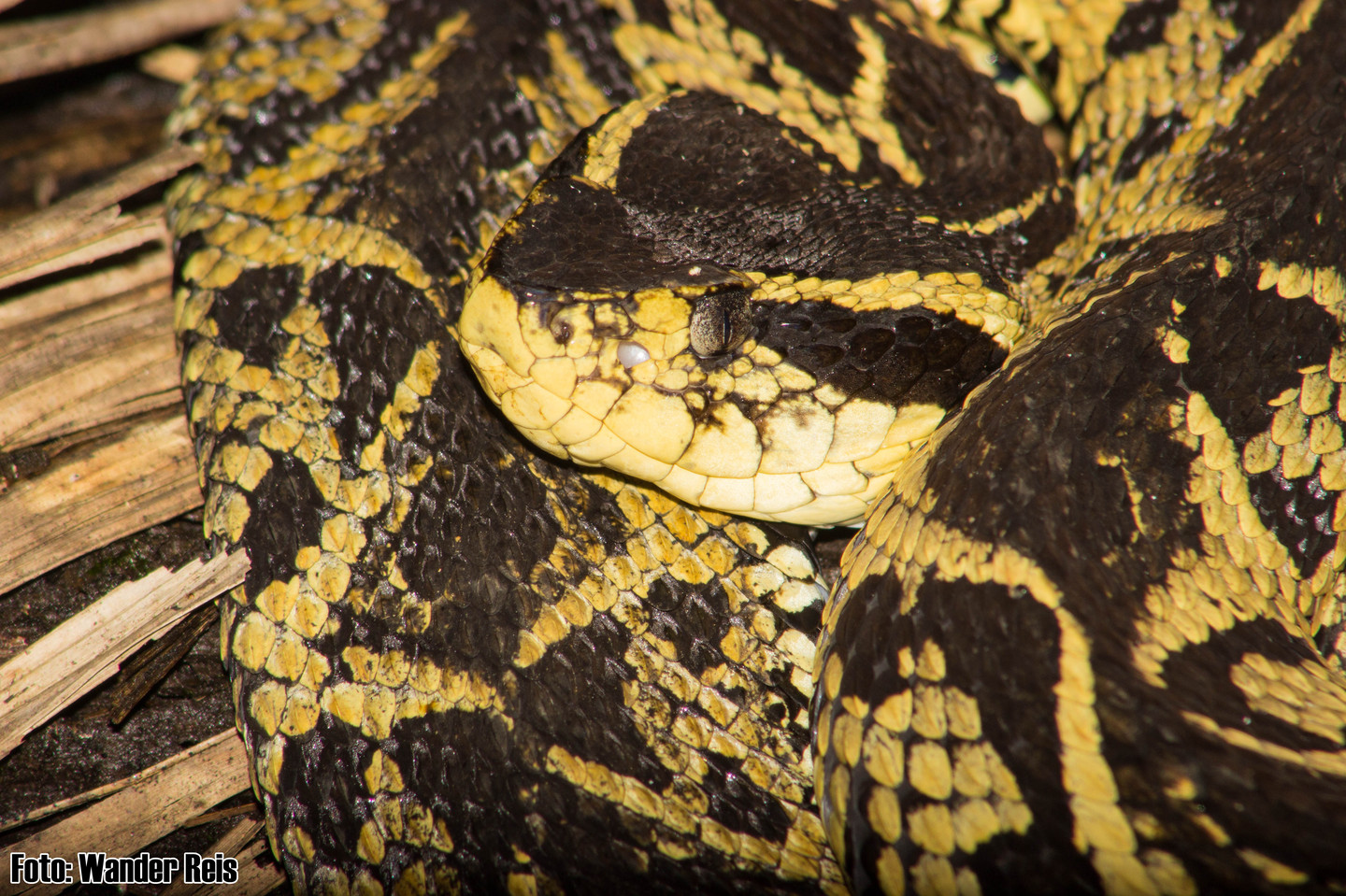

Conservation status
- Least Concern (IUCN 3.1)

Scientific classification
- Kingdom: Animalia
- Phylum: Chordata
- Class: Reptilia
- Order: Squamata
- Suborder: Serpentes
- Family: Viperidae
- Genus: Bothrops
- Species: B. jararacussu

Binomial name
- Bothrops jararacussu Lacerda, 1884
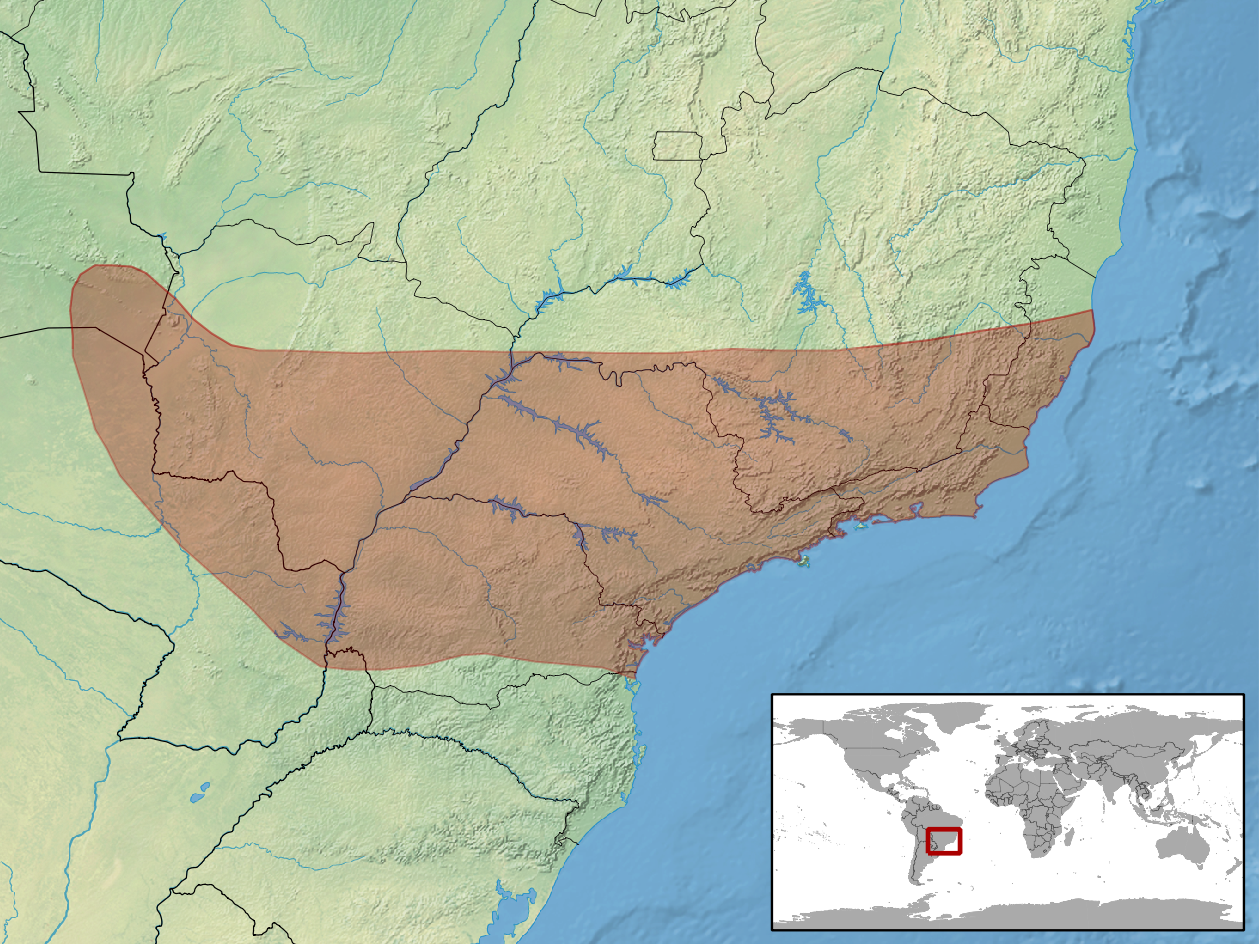

Synonyms
- Bothrops jararacussu Lacerda, 1884; Lachesis jararacussu – Serié, 1915; Lachesis lanceolatus – Boulenger, 1896 (part); Bothrops jararacussu – Amaral, 1925

= Bothrops jararacussu =

Species of snake

Bothrops jararacussu, commonly known in English as the jararacussu, is a highly venomous pit viper species endemic to South America. It is one of the most dreaded snakes in South America and can grow up to 2.2 metres (7.2 ft).

== Description and behavior ==
The jararacussu is a fairly large pit viper, growing up to 2.2 meters long, with a robust body and head and very aggressive behavior. The color of the body and head varies widely; the background color can be brown or yellow, almost black, the pattern of dark and light scales are constituted in a series of dark arches. The spots form on the dorsal midline, which look like the letter x. It has medium-sized eyes, with elliptical pupils vertically. With dorsal scales strongly keeled.

They have large fangs of 2.5 cm, and can inject a lot of venom. They usually feed on amphibians and rodents. They are ovoviviparous, giving birth to between 16 and 20 young, in the rainy season. Mainly diurnal and nocturnal, they usually warm up in the morning sun and venture forth to hunt at night.

== Geographic range ==
It is found in South America in coastal Brazil (from Bahia to Santa Catarina), Paraguay, southeastern Bolivia, and northeastern Argentina (Misiones Province). They can be found in the atlantic forest and semi-deciduous forest. They also live in perennial forests, pine forests in Paraná in low swampy regions and along river banks.

== Common names ==
In Brazil, Bothrops jararacussu is known by many common names, among which are the following: jararacuçu, jararacuçu-verdadeiro, patrona, surucucu, surucucu-dourada, surucucu-tapete, urutu-dourado, and urutu-estrela. Elsewhere in South America it is called Yarara-cussu, Yarara dorada, Yarara guasu, Yarara guazu, Painted Yope and Yoperojobobo.

== Venom ==
Like all other species in the genus Bothrops, the jararacussu has rather potent venom, potent enough to kill sixteen people. The venom contains cytotoxins, hemotoxins and myotoxins, one study with 29 bites of jararacussu in the state of São Paulo, Brazil, found. Severe signs of local and systemic envenoming such as necrosis, shock, spontaneous systemic hemorrhage and renal failure were observed in patients bitten by specimens over 50 cm. Smaller specimens were more likely to cause blood incoagulability. Fourteen patients developed coagulopathy, six had necrosis (causing amputation of one) and five had an abscess. Two were in shock, while four developed kidney failure. Three patients aged 3, 11 and 65 years died due to respiratory and circulatory failure, even with large doses of specific anti-venom management in an intensive care unit. The autopsy of two patients showed acute tubular necrosis, cerebral edema, hemorrhagic rhabdomyolysis at the site of the bite and disseminated intravascular coagulation. One survivor had chronic renal failure, whose autopsy showed bilateral cortical necrosis.

Cerebral hemorrhage and kidney failure have already been reported, in a man bitten by a young jararacussu. The LD_{50} value is 0.14 mg/kg (intravenous injection), 4.92 mg/kg (subcutaneous injection) and 2.73 mg/kg (intraperitoneal injection), while the venom yield is 1000 mg, enough to kill 10,163 rats. Two myotoxins with PLA2 structure, BthTX-I and BthTX-II were isolated from the venom of B. jararacussu, BthTX-I induces various effects such as edema, degranulation of mast cells, irreversible blocking of muscle contraction, rupture of liposomes, and cytotoxicity on muscle cells and endothelial, while BthTX-II induces edema and leukocyte migration.
