= Anaxibia nigricauda =

Scientific classification
- Kingdom: Animalia
- Phylum: Arthropoda
- Subphylum: Chelicerata
- Class: Arachnida
- Order: Araneae
- Infraorder: Araneomorphae
- Family: Dictynidae
- Genus: Anaxibia
- Species: A. nigricauda

Binomial name
- Anaxibia nigricauda (Simon, 1905)

Species of spider

Anaxibia nigricauda is a species of spiders of the genus Anaxibia. It is endemic to Sri Lanka.
