= Brasiliscincus caissara =

Conservation status
- Endangered (IUCN 3.1)

Scientific classification
- Kingdom: Animalia
- Phylum: Chordata
- Class: Reptilia
- Order: Squamata
- Suborder: Scinciformata
- Infraorder: Scincomorpha
- Family: Mabuyidae
- Genus: Brasiliscincus
- Species: B. caissara

Binomial name
- Brasiliscincus caissara (Rebouças-Spieker, 1974)

Species of lizard

Brasiliscincus caissara is a species of skink found in Brazil.
