= Brasiliscincus agilis =

Conservation status
- Least Concern (IUCN 3.1)

Scientific classification
- Domain: Eukaryota
- Kingdom: Animalia
- Phylum: Chordata
- Class: Reptilia
- Order: Squamata
- Family: Scincidae
- Genus: Brasiliscincus
- Species: B. agilis

Binomial name
- Brasiliscincus agilis (Raddi, 1823)

Species of lizard

Brasiliscincus agilis is a species of skink found in Brazil.
