= Elapomorphus quinquelineatus =

Conservation status
- Least Concern (IUCN 3.1)

Scientific classification
- Kingdom: Animalia
- Phylum: Chordata
- Class: Reptilia
- Order: Squamata
- Suborder: Serpentes
- Family: Colubridae
- Genus: Elapomorphus
- Species: E. quinquelineatus

Binomial name
- Elapomorphus quinquelineatus (Raddi, 1820)

Species of snake

Elapomorphus quinquelineatus, Raddi's lizard-eating snake, is a species of snake of the family Colubridae. The species is found in Brazil.
