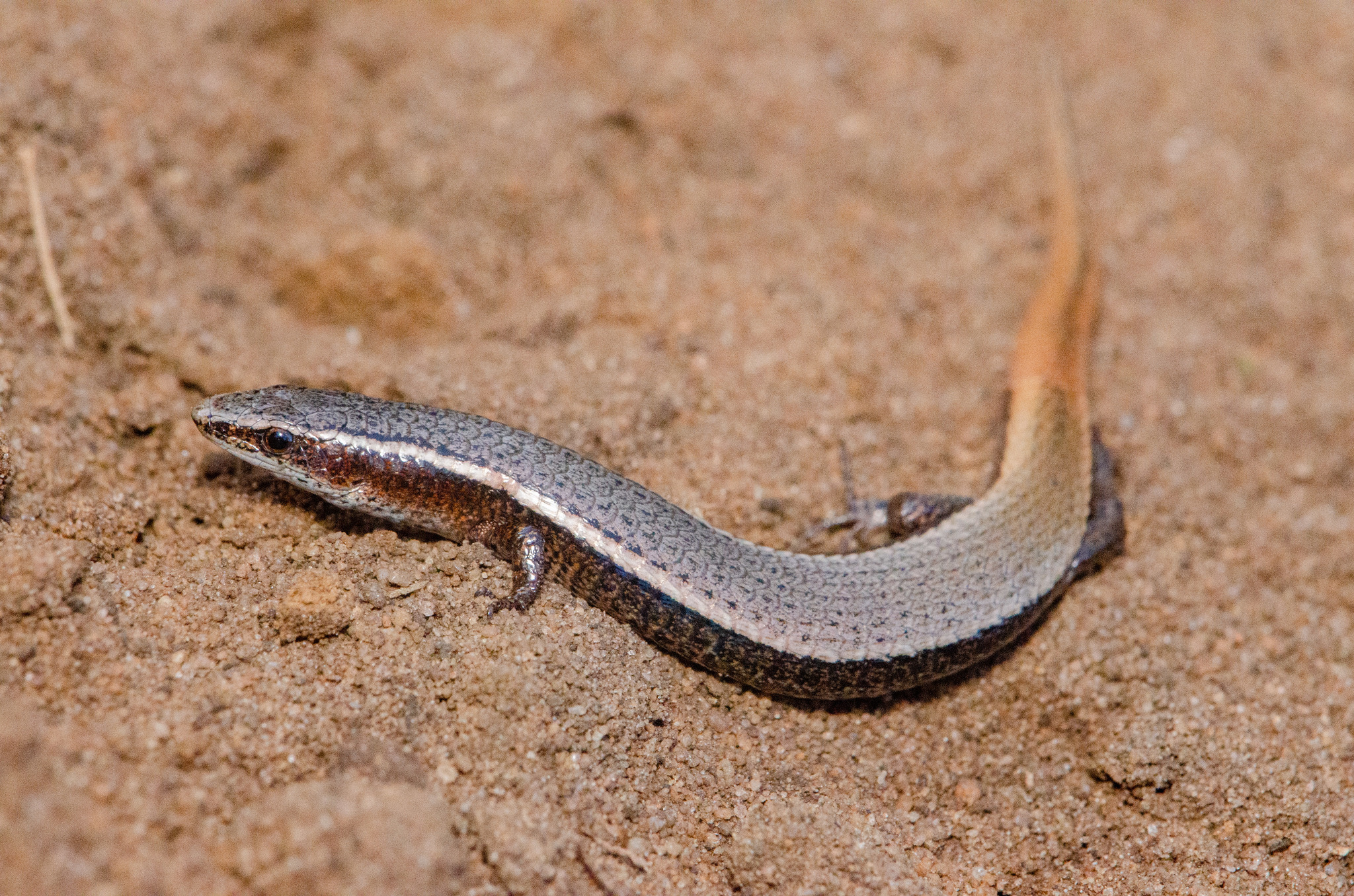

Conservation status
- Least Concern (IUCN 3.1)

Scientific classification
- Kingdom: Animalia
- Phylum: Chordata
- Class: Reptilia
- Order: Squamata
- Family: Gymnophthalmidae
- Genus: Procellosaurinus
- Species: P. erythrocercus

Binomial name
- Procellosaurinus erythrocercus Rodrigues, 1991

= Procellosaurinus erythrocercus =

Species of lizard

Procellosaurinus erythrocercus, Rodrigues's red teiid, is a species of lizard in the family Gymnophthalmidae. It is endemic to Brazil.
