= Vanzolini's worm lizard =

Conservation status
- Least Concern (IUCN 3.1)

Scientific classification
- Kingdom: Animalia
- Phylum: Chordata
- Class: Reptilia
- Order: Squamata
- Clade: Amphisbaenia
- Family: Amphisbaenidae
- Genus: Amphisbaena
- Species: A. vanzolinii

Binomial name
- Amphisbaena vanzolinii Gans, 1963

Synonyms
- Amphisbaena hugoi Vanzolini, 1989

Species of lizard

Vanzolini's worm lizard (Amphisbaena vanzolinii) is a species of amphisbaenian in the family Amphisbaenidae. The species is native to northern South America.

== Etymology ==
The specific name, vanzolinii, is in honor of Brazilian herpetologist Paulo Vanzolini.

== Geographic range ==
A. vanzolinii is found in northern Brazil, Guyana (formerly British Guiana), and Suriname.

== Habitat ==
The preferred natural habitat of A. vanzolinii is forest.

== Reproduction ==
A. vanzolinii is oviparous.

== See also ==
- List of reptiles of Brazil
