= Procellosaurinus tetradactylus =

Scientific classification
- Kingdom: Animalia
- Phylum: Chordata
- Class: Reptilia
- Order: Squamata
- Family: Gymnophthalmidae
- Genus: Procellosaurinus
- Species: P. tetradactylus

Binomial name
- Procellosaurinus tetradactylus Rodrigues, 1991

Species of lizard

Procellosaurinus tetradactylus, Rodrigues's four-fingered teiid, is a species of lizard in the family Gymnophthalmidae. It is endemic to Brazil.
