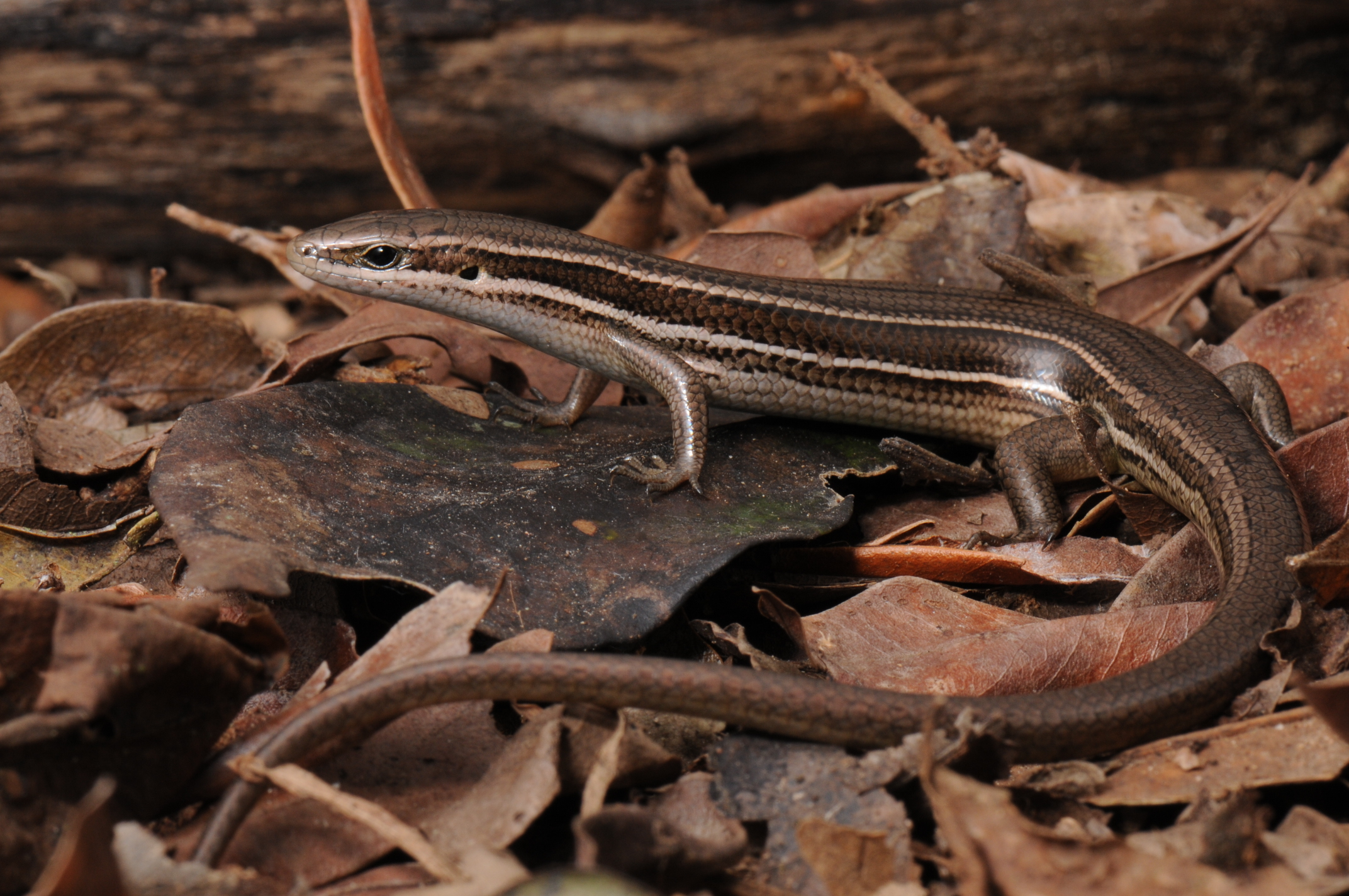

Conservation status
- Least Concern (IUCN 3.1)

Scientific classification
- Kingdom: Animalia
- Phylum: Chordata
- Class: Reptilia
- Order: Squamata
- Suborder: Scinciformata
- Infraorder: Scincomorpha
- Family: Mabuyidae
- Genus: Aspronema
- Species: A. dorsivittatum

Binomial name
- Aspronema dorsivittatum (Cope, 1862)

= Aspronema dorsivittatum =

Species of lizard

The Paraguay mabuya (Aspronema dorsivittatum) is a species of skink found in Uruguay, Paraguay, Argentina, Brazil, and Bolivia.
