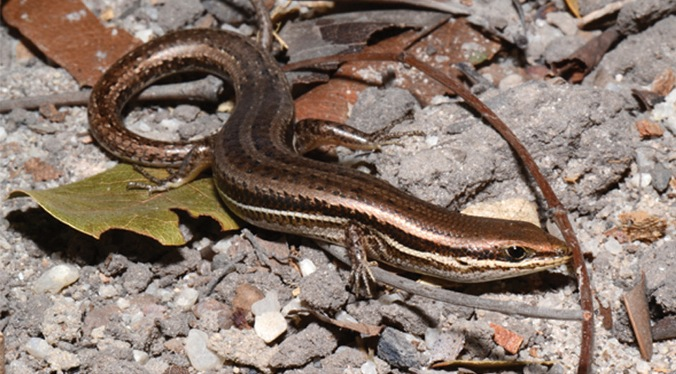

Conservation status
- Least Concern (IUCN 3.1)

Scientific classification
- Kingdom: Animalia
- Phylum: Chordata
- Class: Reptilia
- Order: Squamata
- Family: Scincidae
- Genus: Brasiliscincus
- Species: B. heathi

Binomial name
- Brasiliscincus heathi (Schmidt & Inger, 1951)

Synonyms
- Mabuya heathi Schmidt & Inger, 1951

= Brasiliscincus heathi =

Species of lizard

Brasiliscincus heathi, also known commonly as the Brazilian mabuya, is a species of skink, a lizard in the family Scincidae. The species is endemic to Brazil.

== Etymology ==
The specific name, heathi, is in honor of American malacologist Harold Heath.

== Habitat ==
The preferred natural habitat of B. heathi is savanna.

== Diet ==
B. heathi preys upon locusts and also consumes insect larvae.

== Reproduction ==
B. heathi is ovoviviparous. Litter size is 2–9 newborns.
