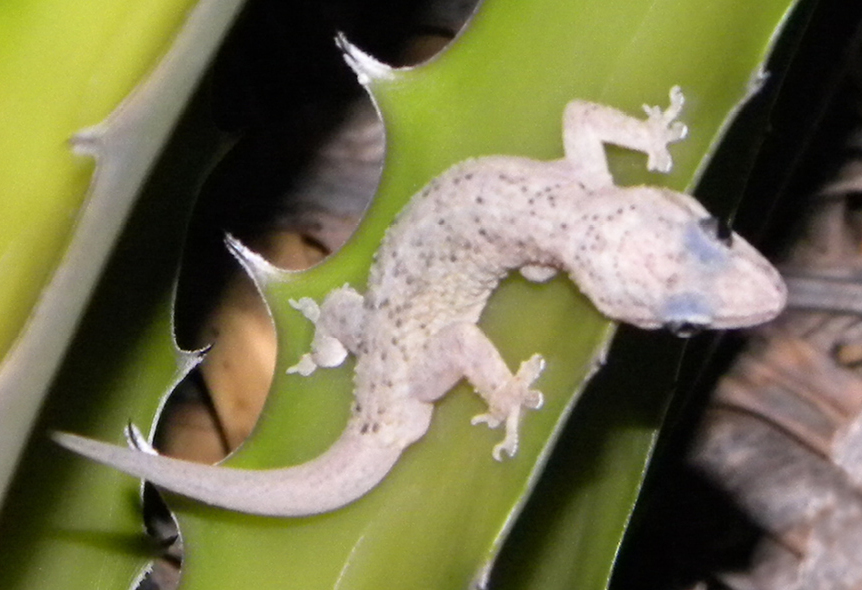

Scientific classification
- Domain: Eukaryota
- Kingdom: Animalia
- Phylum: Chordata
- Class: Reptilia
- Order: Squamata
- Infraorder: Gekkota
- Family: Gekkonidae
- Genus: Hemidactylus
- Species: H. agrius

Binomial name
- Hemidactylus agrius Vanzolini, 1978

= Country leaf-toed gecko =

Species of lizard

The country leaf-toed gecko (Hemidactylus agrius) is a species of gecko from the family of Gekkonidae, found in northeastern Brazil.
