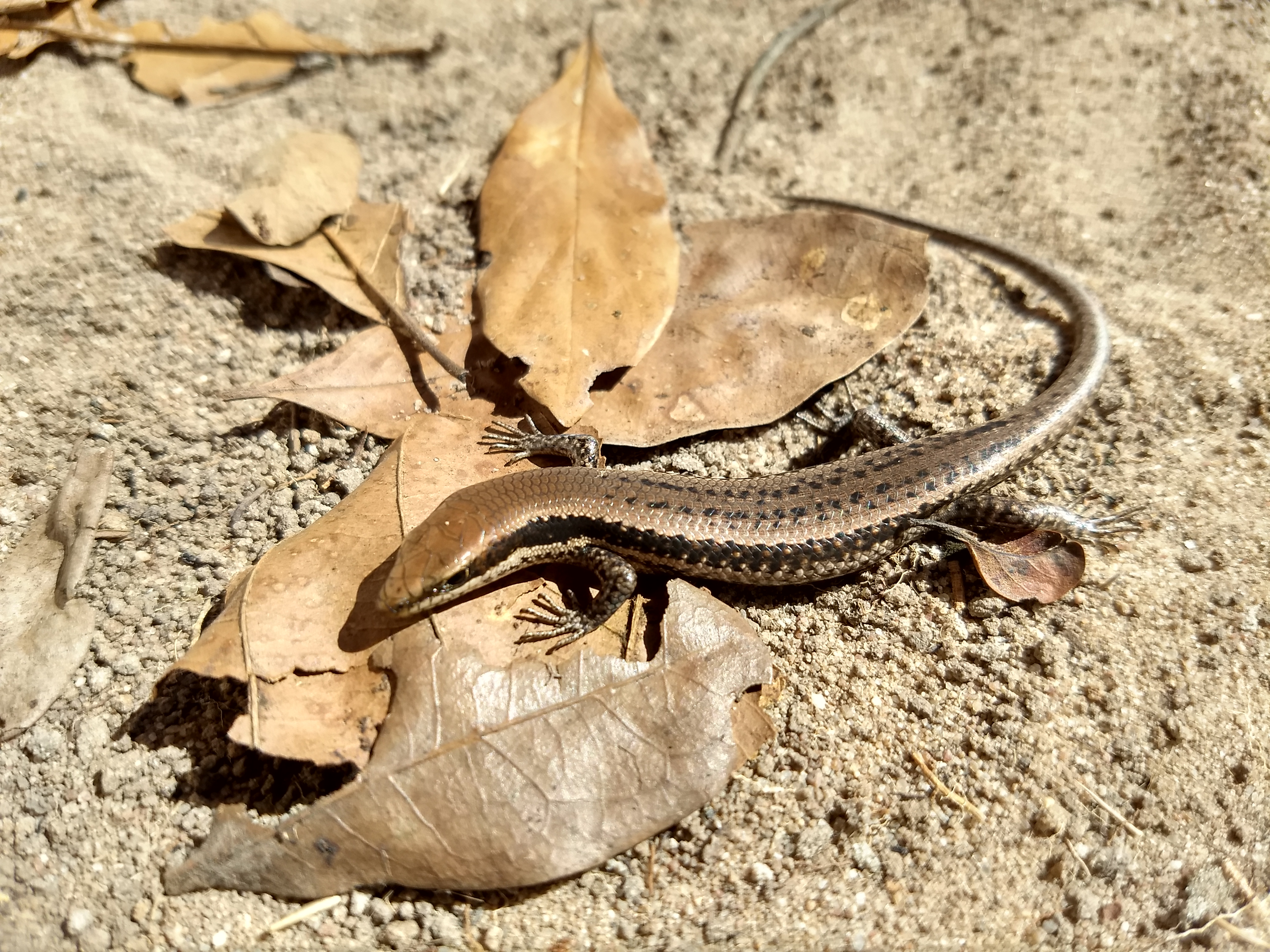

Conservation status
- Least Concern (IUCN 3.1)

Scientific classification
- Kingdom: Animalia
- Phylum: Chordata
- Class: Reptilia
- Order: Squamata
- Family: Scincidae
- Genus: Notomabuya; Hedges & Conn, 2012
- Species: N. frenata

Binomial name
- Notomabuya frenata (Cope, 1862)

Synonyms
- Emoea frenata Cope, 1862; Eumeces Nattereri Steindachner, 1870; Mabuya frenata (Cope, 1862); Mabuia frenata (Cope, 1862)

= Cope's mabuya =

Species of lizard

Notomabuya is a genus of skinks. It contains one species, Notomabuya frenata, which is found in South America (Brazil, Bolivia, Paraguay, and northeast Argentina.

== Characteristics ==
This species is viviparous and shows sexual dimorphism in body size, with adults females being bigger than males.

== Ecology ==
N. frenata is a diurnal and viviparous species, and its diet is composed mainly by small arthropods, although preying in another smaller lizards and even cannibalism were already registered.
