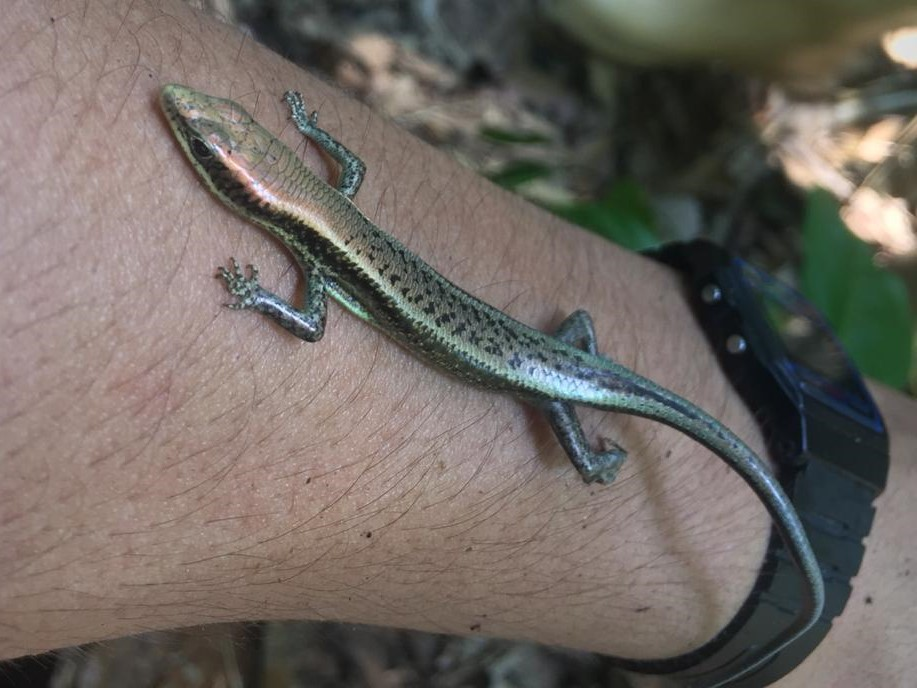

Conservation status
- Least Concern (IUCN 3.1)

Scientific classification
- Kingdom: Animalia
- Phylum: Chordata
- Class: Reptilia
- Order: Squamata
- Family: Scincidae
- Genus: Exila; Hedges & Conn, 2012
- Species: E. nigropalmata

Binomial name
- Exila nigropalmata (Andersson, 1918)

Synonyms
- Mabuia nigropalmata; Mabuya nigropalmata

= Black mabuya =

Species of lizard

The black mabuya (Exila nigropalmata) is a species of skink in the family Scincidae. It is the only species in the monotypic genus Exila. It is found in Brazil, Bolivia, and Peru.
