= Manciola =

Conservation status
- Least Concern (IUCN 3.1)

Scientific classification
- Kingdom: Animalia
- Phylum: Chordata
- Class: Reptilia
- Order: Squamata
- Family: Scincidae
- Genus: Manciola; Hedges & Conn, 2012
- Species: M. guaporicola

Binomial name
- Manciola guaporicola (Dunn, 1935)

Synonyms
- Mabuya guaporicola Dunn, 1936

Genus of lizards

Manciola is a genus of skinks. It contains one species, Manciola guaporicola, which is found in South America (Brazil, Bolivia, and Paraguay). It is also known as Dunn's mabuya or South American small-handed skink.
