= Calyptommatus sinebrachiatus =

Scientific classification
- Kingdom: Animalia
- Phylum: Chordata
- Class: Reptilia
- Order: Squamata
- Family: Gymnophthalmidae
- Genus: Calyptommatus
- Species: C. sinebrachiatus

Binomial name
- Calyptommatus sinebrachiatus Rodrigues, 1991

Species of lizard

Calyptommatus sinebrachiatus is a species of lizard in the family Gymnophthalmidae. It is endemic to Brazil.
