= Placosoma limaverdorum =

Scientific classification
- Domain: Eukaryota
- Kingdom: Animalia
- Phylum: Chordata
- Class: Reptilia
- Order: Squamata
- Family: Gymnophthalmidae
- Genus: Placosoma
- Species: P. limaverdorum

Binomial name
- Placosoma limaverdorum Borges-Nojosa, Caramaschi, & Rodrigues, 2016

Species of lizard

Placosoma limaverdorum is a species of lizard in the family Gymnophthalmidae. It is endemic to Brazil.
