= Heterodactylus septentrionalis =

Scientific classification
- Domain: Eukaryota
- Kingdom: Animalia
- Phylum: Chordata
- Class: Reptilia
- Order: Squamata
- Family: Gymnophthalmidae
- Genus: Heterodactylus
- Species: H. septentrionalis

Binomial name
- Heterodactylus septentrionalis Rodrigues, de Freitas, & Santos Silva, 2009

Species of lizard

Heterodactylus septentrionalis is a species of lizard in the family Gymnophthalmidae. It is endemic to Brazil.
