= Calyptommatus leiolepis =

Scientific classification
- Kingdom: Animalia
- Phylum: Chordata
- Class: Reptilia
- Order: Squamata
- Family: Gymnophthalmidae
- Genus: Calyptommatus
- Species: C. leiolepis

Binomial name
- Calyptommatus leiolepis Rodrigues, 1991

Species of lizard

Calyptommatus leiolepis is a species of lizard in the family Gymnophthalmidae. It is endemic to Brazil.
