= Acratosaura spinosa =

Scientific classification
- Kingdom: Animalia
- Phylum: Chordata
- Class: Reptilia
- Order: Squamata
- Family: Gymnophthalmidae
- Genus: Acratosaura
- Species: A. spinosa

Binomial name
- Acratosaura spinosa Rodrigues, Cassimiro, De Freitas, & Santos Silva, 2009

Species of lizard

Acratosaura spinosa, the spiny colobosaura, is a species of lizard in the family Gymnophthalmidae. It is endemic to Brazil.
