= Leposoma sinepollex =

Scientific classification
- Domain: Eukaryota
- Kingdom: Animalia
- Phylum: Chordata
- Class: Reptilia
- Order: Squamata
- Family: Gymnophthalmidae
- Genus: Leposoma
- Species: L. sinepollex

Binomial name
- Leposoma sinepollex Rodrigues, Teixeira Jr., Recoder, Dal Vechio, Damasceno, & Machado Pellegrino, 2013

Species of lizard

Leposoma sinepollex is a species of lizard in the family Gymnophthalmidae. It is endemic to Brazil. It has lanceolate ventral and elongate dorsal scales arranged in diagonal rows. Males of this species have black pigmentation in their ventral parts, while females have a creamy pigmentation.
