= Psilops seductus =

Scientific classification
- Domain: Eukaryota
- Kingdom: Animalia
- Phylum: Chordata
- Class: Reptilia
- Order: Squamata
- Family: Gymnophthalmidae
- Genus: Psilops
- Species: P. seductus

Binomial name
- Psilops seductus Rodrigues, Recoder, Teixeira, Roscito, Camacho, Sales-Nunes, Freitas, Fernandes, Bocchiglieri, Dal Vechio, Leite, Nogueira, Damasceno, Pellegrino, Argôlo, & Amaro,2017

Species of lizard

Psilops seductus is a species of lizard in the family Gymnophthalmidae. It is endemic to Brazil.
