= Leposoma nanodactylus =

Scientific classification
- Domain: Eukaryota
- Kingdom: Animalia
- Phylum: Chordata
- Class: Reptilia
- Order: Squamata
- Family: Gymnophthalmidae
- Genus: Leposoma
- Species: L. nanodactylus

Binomial name
- Leposoma nanodactylus Rodrigues, 1997

Species of lizard

Leposoma nanodactylus is a species of lizard in the family Gymnophthalmidae. It is endemic to Brazil.
