= Leposoma puk =

Scientific classification
- Domain: Eukaryota
- Kingdom: Animalia
- Phylum: Chordata
- Class: Reptilia
- Order: Squamata
- Family: Gymnophthalmidae
- Genus: Leposoma
- Species: L. puk

Binomial name
- Leposoma puk Rodrigues, Dixo, Pavan, & Verdade, 2002

Species of lizard

Leposoma puk is a species of lizard in the family Gymnophthalmidae endemic to Brazil.
