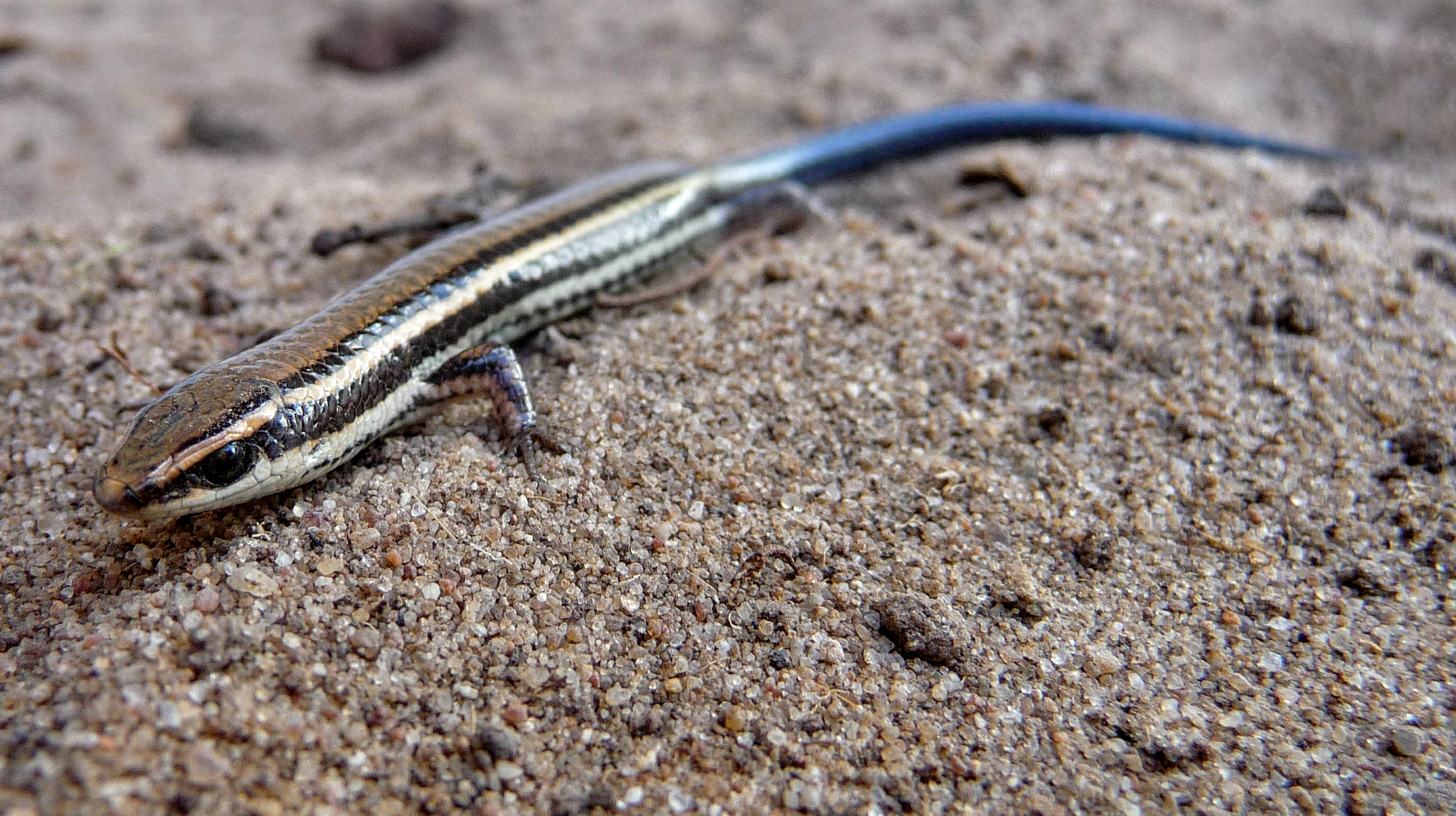

Conservation status
- Least Concern (IUCN 3.1)

Scientific classification
- Kingdom: Animalia
- Phylum: Chordata
- Class: Reptilia
- Order: Squamata
- Suborder: Lacertoidea
- Family: Gymnophthalmidae
- Genus: Micrablepharus
- Species: M. atticolus

Binomial name
- Micrablepharus atticolus Rodrigues, 1996

= Micrablepharus atticolus =

Species of lizard

Micrablepharus atticolus is a species of lizard in the family Gymnophthalmidae. It is endemic to Brazil.
