= Calyptommatus nicterus =

Scientific classification
- Kingdom: Animalia
- Phylum: Chordata
- Class: Reptilia
- Order: Squamata
- Family: Gymnophthalmidae
- Genus: Calyptommatus
- Species: C. nicterus

Binomial name
- Calyptommatus nicterus Rodrigues, 1991

Species of lizard

Calyptommatus nicterus is a species of Squamata in the family spectacled tegus. They are found in the Neotropics of Brazil. They rely on running to move around. This is species of lizard in the family Gymnophthalmidae. It is endemic to Brazil.
