= Gelanesaurus flavogularis =

Conservation status
- Least Concern (IUCN 3.1)

Scientific classification
- Kingdom: Animalia
- Phylum: Chordata
- Class: Reptilia
- Order: Squamata
- Family: Gymnophthalmidae
- Genus: Gelanesaurus
- Species: G. flavogularis

Binomial name
- Gelanesaurus flavogularis (Altamirano-Benavides, Zaher, Lobo, Grazziotin, Sales Nunes & Rodrigues, 2013)

Synonyms
- Potamites flavogularis Altamirano-Benavides et al., 2013; Gelanesaurus flavogularis — Torres-Carvajal et al., 2016

Species of lizard

Gelanesaurus flavogularis is a species of lizard in the family Gymnophthalmidae. The species is endemic to Ecuador.

== Geographic range ==
G. flavogularis is found in Napo and Tungurahua Provinces, eastern Ecuador.

== Habitat ==
The preferred natural habitat of G. flavogularis, is freshwater wetlands within forest, at altitudes of 1,440–1,800 m (4,720–5,910 ft).

== Description ==
G. flavogularis can be identified by the presence of calcareous spinules on flounces of the hemipenis. The tail is slightly compressed and lack tubercles. Tubercles are also absent from the sides of the neck and the gular region.

== Reproduction ==
The mode of reproduction of G. flavogularis is unknown.
