= Rondonops xanthomystax =

Scientific classification
- Domain: Eukaryota
- Kingdom: Animalia
- Phylum: Chordata
- Class: Reptilia
- Order: Squamata
- Family: Gymnophthalmidae
- Genus: Rondonops
- Species: R. xanthomystax

Binomial name
- Rondonops xanthomystax Colli, Hoogmoed, Cannatella, Cassimiro, Gomes, Ghellere, Sales-Nunes, Pellegrino, Salerno, Souza, & Rodrigues, 2015

Species of lizard

Rondonops xanthomystax is a species of lizard in the family Gymnophthalmidae. It is endemic to Brazil.
