= Vanzosaura savanicola =

Conservation status
- Least Concern (IUCN 3.1)

Scientific classification
- Kingdom: Animalia
- Phylum: Chordata
- Class: Reptilia
- Order: Squamata
- Family: Gymnophthalmidae
- Genus: Vanzosaura
- Species: V. savanicola

Binomial name
- Vanzosaura savanicola Recoder, Werneck, Teixeira, Colli, Sites, Rodrigues, 2014

Species of lizard

Vanzosaura savanicola is a species of lizard in the family Gymnophthalmidae. It is endemic to Brazil.
