= Psilops paeminosus =

Conservation status
- Vulnerable (IUCN 3.1)

Scientific classification
- Kingdom: Animalia
- Phylum: Chordata
- Class: Reptilia
- Order: Squamata
- Suborder: Lacertoidea
- Family: Gymnophthalmidae
- Genus: Psilops
- Species: P. paeminosus

Binomial name
- Psilops paeminosus (Rodrigues, 1991)

Synonyms
- Psilophthalmus paeminosus Rodrigues, 1991

Species of lizard

Psilops paeminosus is a species of gymnophthalmid lizard (spectacled lizards). It is endemic to the states of Sergipe and Bahia in the Northeast Region, Brazil.
