= Leposoma baturitensis =

Scientific classification
- Kingdom: Animalia
- Phylum: Chordata
- Class: Reptilia
- Order: Squamata
- Family: Gymnophthalmidae
- Genus: Leposoma
- Species: L. baturitensis

Binomial name
- Leposoma baturitensis Rodrigues & Borges, 1997

Species of lizard

Leposoma baturitensis is a species of lizard in the family Gymnophthalmidae. It is endemic to Brazil.
