= Calyptommatus frontalis =

Scientific classification
- Kingdom: Animalia
- Phylum: Chordata
- Class: Reptilia
- Order: Squamata
- Family: Gymnophthalmidae
- Genus: Calyptommatus
- Species: C. frontalis

Binomial name
- Calyptommatus frontalis Recoder, Marques-Souza, Silva-Soares, Ramiro, Castro, & Rodrigues, 2022

Species of lizard

Calyptommatus frontalis is a species of lizard in the family Gymnophthalmidae. It is endemic to Brazil.
