= Calyptommatus confusionibus =

Conservation status
- Least Concern (IUCN 3.1)

Scientific classification
- Kingdom: Animalia
- Phylum: Chordata
- Class: Reptilia
- Order: Squamata
- Family: Gymnophthalmidae
- Genus: Calyptommatus
- Species: C. confusionibus

Binomial name
- Calyptommatus confusionibus Rodrigues, Zaher, & Curcio, 1991

Species of lizard

Calyptommatus confusionibus is a species of lizard in the family Gymnophthalmidae. It is endemic to Brazil.
