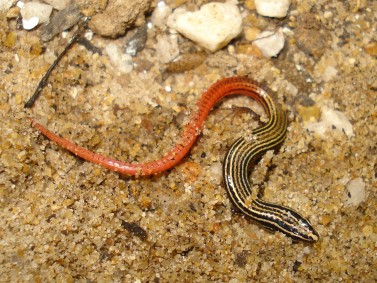
- Vanzosaura rubricauda

Scientific classification
- Kingdom: Animalia
- Phylum: Chordata
- Class: Reptilia
- Order: Squamata
- Family: Gymnophthalmidae
- Genus: Vanzosaura; Rodrigues, 1991

= Vanzosaura =

Genus of lizards

Vanzosaura is a genus of lizards in the family Gymnophthalmidae. The genus is endemic to South America.

== Etymology ==
The generic name, Vanzosaura, is in honor of Brazilian herpetologist Paulo Vanzolini.

== Species ==
The genus Vanzosaura contains three accepted species.

- Vanzosaura multiscutata (Amaral, 1933)
- Vanzosaura rubricauda (Boulenger, 1902) - red-tailed vanzosaur, redtail tegu
- Vanzosaura savanicola Recoder, Werneck, Teixeira Jr, Colli, Sites, & Rodrigues, 2014

Nota bene: A binomial authority in parentheses indicates that the species was originally described in a genus other than Vanzosaura.
