= Macropholidus annectens =

Conservation status
- Endangered (IUCN 3.1)

Scientific classification
- Kingdom: Animalia
- Phylum: Chordata
- Class: Reptilia
- Order: Squamata
- Family: Gymnophthalmidae
- Genus: Macropholidus
- Species: M. annectens

Binomial name
- Macropholidus annectens Parker, 1930

Species of lizard

Macropholidus annectens, Parker's pholiodobolus , is a species of lizard in the family Gymnophthalmidae. It is endemic to Ecuador.
