= Gelanesaurus cochranae =

Conservation status
- Least Concern (IUCN 3.1)

Scientific classification
- Kingdom: Animalia
- Phylum: Chordata
- Class: Reptilia
- Order: Squamata
- Family: Gymnophthalmidae
- Genus: Gelanesaurus
- Species: G. cochranae

Binomial name
- Gelanesaurus cochranae (C. Burt & M. Burt, 1931)

Synonyms
- Neusticurus ecpleopus cochranae C. Burt & M. Burt, 1931; Neusticurus cochranae — Uzzell, 1966; Potamites cochranae — Doan & Castoe, 2005; Gelanesaurus cochranae — Torres-Carvajal et al., 2016

Species of lizards

Gelanesaurus cochranae, also known commonly as Cochran's neusticurus, is a species of lizard in the family Gymnophthalmidae. The species is native to northwestern South America.

== Etymology ==
The specific name, cochranae, was chosen in honor of American herpetologist Doris Mable Cochran.

== Geographic range ==
G. cochranae is found in Colombia and Ecuador.

== Habitat ==
The preferred natural habitats of G. cochranae are forest and freshwater wetlands, up to an altitude of 2,100 m (6,900 ft).

== Reproduction ==
G. cochranae is oviparous.
