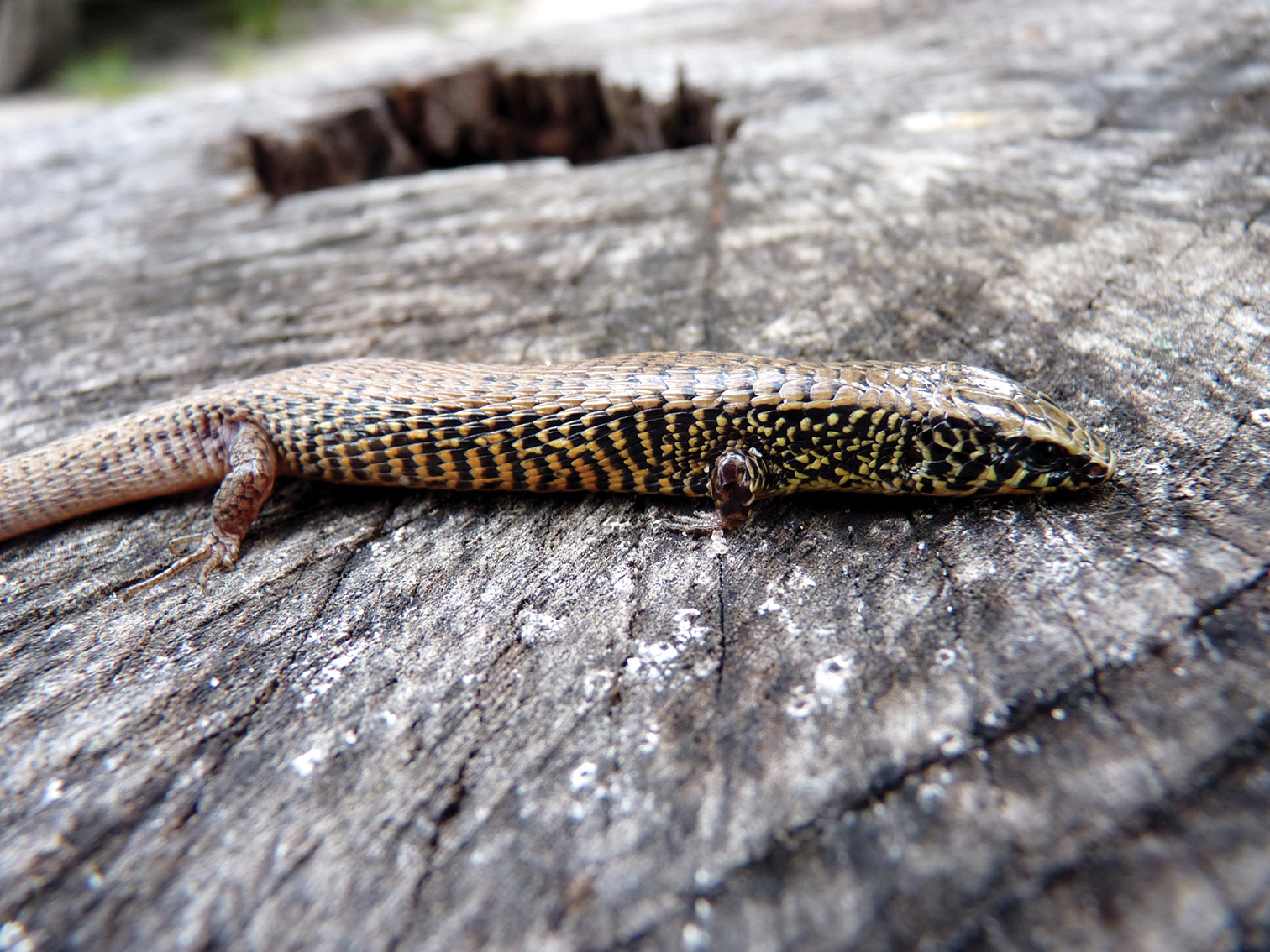

Scientific classification
- Domain: Eukaryota
- Kingdom: Animalia
- Phylum: Chordata
- Class: Reptilia
- Order: Squamata
- Family: Gymnophthalmidae
- Genus: Colobosaura
- Species: C. modesta

Binomial name
- Colobosaura modesta (Reinhardt & Lütken, 1862)

Synonyms
- Perodactylus modestus Reinhardt & Lütken, 1862

= Colobosaura modesta =

Species of lizard

Colobosaura modesta, the Bahia colobosaura, is a species of lizard in the family Gymnophthalmidae. It is found in Brazil and Paraguay.
