= Petracola angustisoma =

Scientific classification
- Kingdom: Animalia
- Phylum: Chordata
- Class: Reptilia
- Order: Squamata
- Family: Gymnophthalmidae
- Genus: Petracola
- Species: P. angustisoma

Binomial name
- Petracola angustisoma Echevarría & Venegas, 2015

Species of lizard

Petracola angustisoma is a species of lizard in the family Gymnophthalmidae. It is endemic to Peru.
