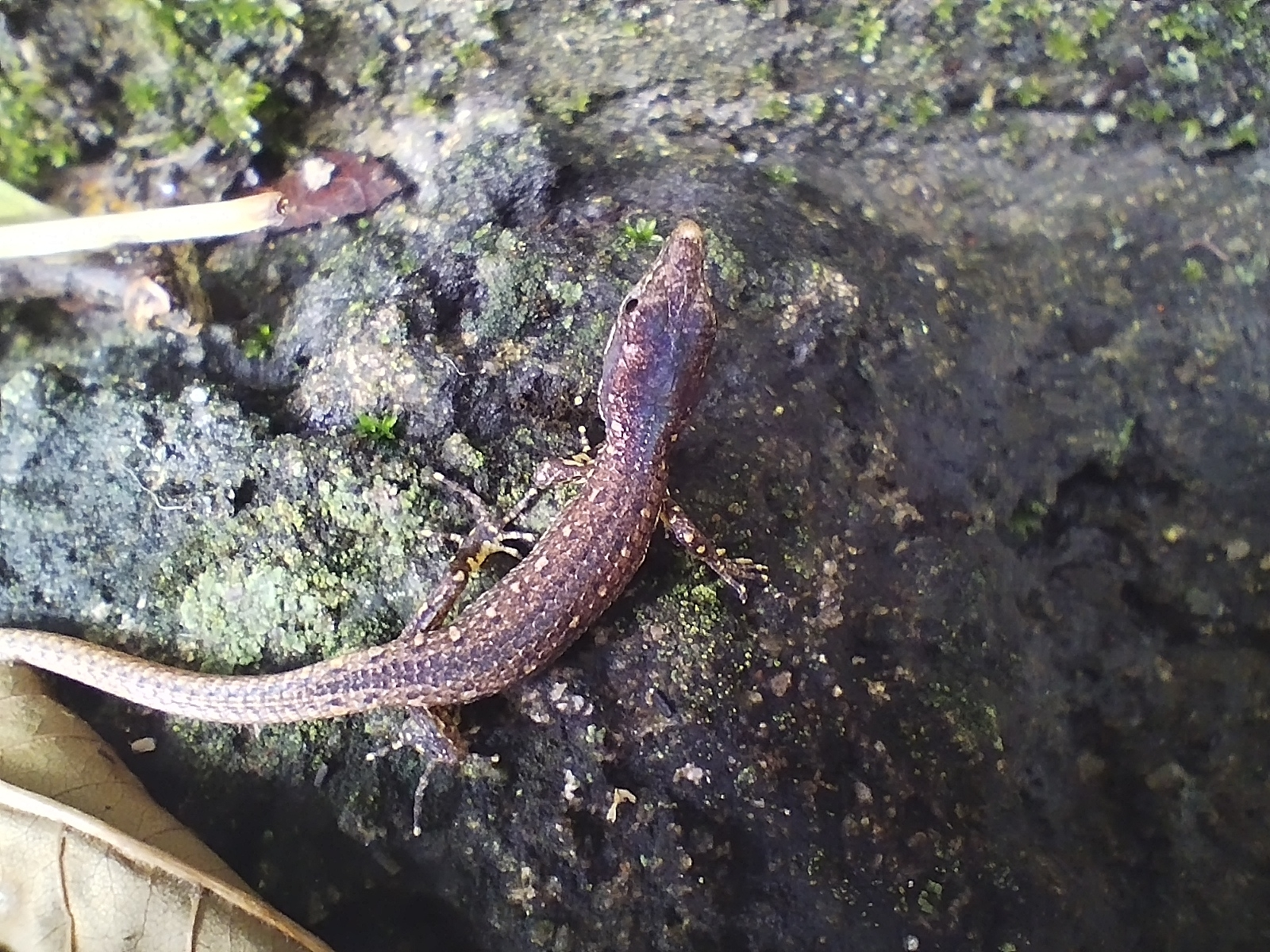

Conservation status
- Least Concern (IUCN 3.1)

Scientific classification
- Kingdom: Animalia
- Phylum: Chordata
- Class: Reptilia
- Order: Squamata
- Suborder: Lacertoidea
- Family: Gymnophthalmidae
- Genus: Placosoma
- Species: P. glabellum

Binomial name
- Placosoma glabellum (Peters, 1870)

= Placosoma glabellum =

Species of lizard

Placosoma glabellum is a species of lizard in the family Gymnophthalmidae that is endemic to Brazil.
