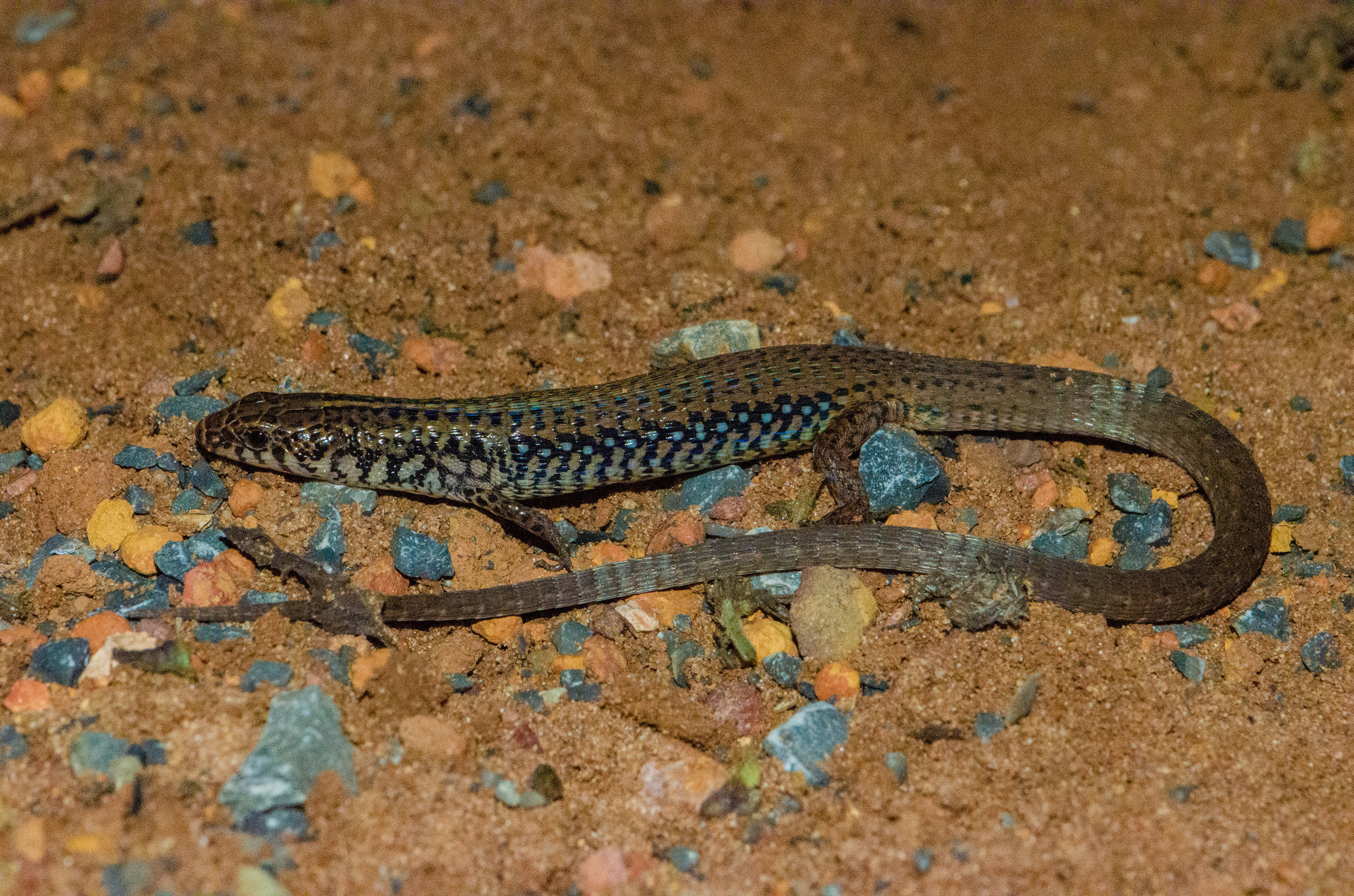

Scientific classification
- Kingdom: Animalia
- Phylum: Chordata
- Class: Reptilia
- Order: Squamata
- Family: Gymnophthalmidae
- Genus: Acratosaura; Rodrigues, Pellegrino, Dixo, Verdade, Pavan, Argolo, & Sites, 2007

= Acratosaura =

Genus of lizards

Acratosaura is a genus of lizards in the family Gymnophthalmidae. The genus is endemic to Brazil.

== Species ==
The genus Acratosaura contains 2 species which are recognized as being valid.

- Acratosaura mentalis (Amaral, 1933) – Amaral's colobosaura
- Acratosaura spinosa Rodrigues, Cassimiro, De Freitas, & Santos Silva, 2009 – spiny colobosaura

Nota bene: A binomial authority in parentheses indicates that the species was originally described in a genus other than Acratosaura.
