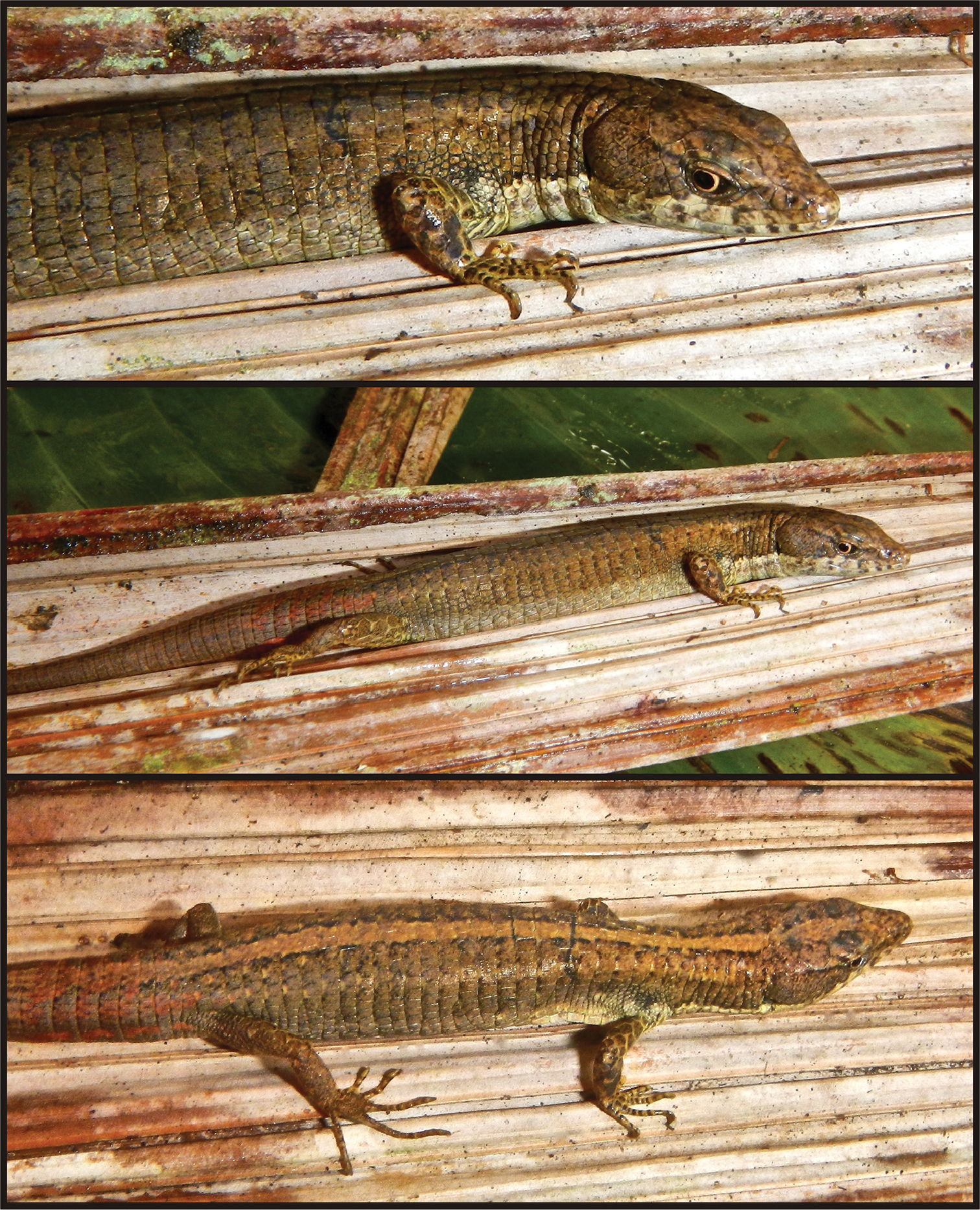

Scientific classification
- Kingdom: Animalia
- Phylum: Chordata
- Class: Reptilia
- Order: Squamata
- Family: Gymnophthalmidae
- Genus: Selvasaura
- Species: S. brava

Binomial name
- Selvasaura brava Moravec, Šmid, Štundl, & Lehr, 2018

= Selvasaura brava =

Species of lizard

Selvasaura brava, the brave forest microtegu, occurs in Peru.
