= Petracola ventrimaculatus =

Scientific classification
- Kingdom: Animalia
- Phylum: Chordata
- Class: Reptilia
- Order: Squamata
- Family: Gymnophthalmidae
- Genus: Petracola
- Species: P. ventrimaculatus

Binomial name
- Petracola ventrimaculatus (Boulenger, 1900)

Species of lizard

Petracola ventrimaculatus, the spotted lightbulb lizard, is a species of lizard in the family Gymnophthalmidae. It is endemic to Peru.
