= Magdalenasaura leurosquama =

Scientific classification
- Kingdom: Animalia
- Phylum: Chordata
- Order: Squamata
- Family: Gymnophthalmidae
- Genus: Magdalenasaura
- Species: M. leurosquama

Binomial name
- Magdalenasaura leurosquama Fang, Vásquez-Restrepo & Daza, 2020

Species of lizard

Magdalenasaura leurosquama is a species of lizard in the family Gymnophthalmidae. It is endemic to Antioquia, Colombia.
