= Macropholidus ataktolepis =

Conservation status
- Data Deficient (IUCN 3.1)

Scientific classification
- Kingdom: Animalia
- Phylum: Chordata
- Class: Reptilia
- Order: Squamata
- Family: Gymnophthalmidae
- Genus: Macropholidus
- Species: M. ataktolepis

Binomial name
- Macropholidus ataktolepis Cadle & Chuna, 1995

Species of lizard

Macropholidus ataktolepis is a species of lizard in the family Gymnophthalmidae. It is endemic to Peru.
