= Magdalenasaura adercum =

Scientific classification
- Kingdom: Animalia
- Phylum: Chordata
- Order: Squamata
- Family: Gymnophthalmidae
- Genus: Magdalenasaura
- Species: M. adercum

Binomial name
- Magdalenasaura adercum Fang, Vásquez-Restrepo & Daza, 2020

Species of lizard

Magdalenasaura adercum is a species of lizard in the family Gymnophthalmidae. It is endemic to Antioquia, Colombia.
