= Rhachisaurus =

Scientific classification
- Kingdom: Animalia
- Phylum: Chordata
- Class: Reptilia
- Order: Squamata
- Family: Gymnophthalmidae
- Genus: Rhachisaurus; Pellegrino, Rodrigues, Yonenaga-Yassuda, & Sites, 2001
- Species: R. brachylepis

Binomial name
- Rhachisaurus brachylepis (Dixon, 1974)

Synonyms
- Anotosaura brachylepis

Genus of lizards

Rhachisaurus is a genus of the lizard family Gymnophthalmidae. The genus is monotypic, i.e. it has only one species, Rhachisaurus brachylepis. It occurs in Brazil.
