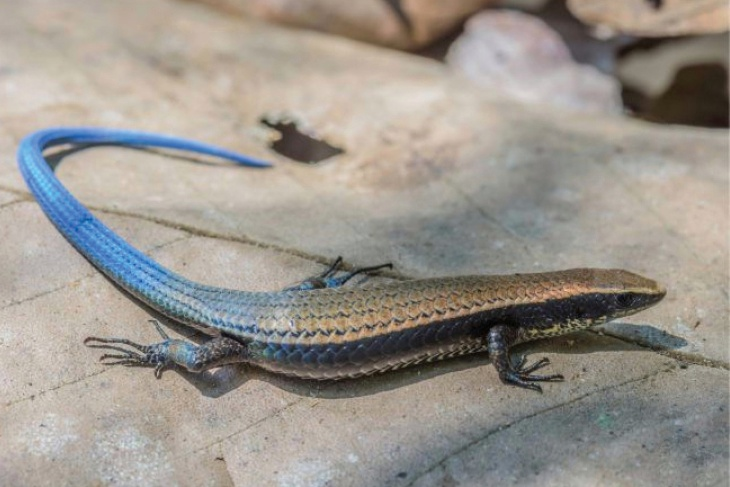

Conservation status
- Least Concern (IUCN 3.1)

Scientific classification
- Kingdom: Animalia
- Phylum: Chordata
- Class: Reptilia
- Order: Squamata
- Family: Gymnophthalmidae
- Genus: Tretioscincus
- Species: T. oriximinensis

Binomial name
- Tretioscincus oriximinensis Ávila-Pires, 1995

= Tretioscincus oriximinensis =

Species of lizard

Tretioscincus oriximinensis, the Oriximina lizard, is a species of lizard in the family Gymnophthalmidae. It is found in Brazil, Venezuela, and Colombia.
