= Macropholidus montanuccii =

Scientific classification
- Kingdom: Animalia
- Phylum: Chordata
- Class: Reptilia
- Order: Squamata
- Family: Gymnophthalmidae
- Genus: Macropholidus
- Species: M. montanuccii

Binomial name
- Macropholidus montanuccii Torres-Carvajal, Venegas & Nunes, 2020

Species of lizard

Macropholidus montanuccii is a species of lizard in the family Gymnophthalmidae. It is endemic to Peru.
