= Petracola waka =

Scientific classification
- Kingdom: Animalia
- Phylum: Chordata
- Class: Reptilia
- Order: Squamata
- Family: Gymnophthalmidae
- Genus: Petracola
- Species: P. waka

Binomial name
- Petracola waka Kizirian, Bayefsky-Anand, Eriksson, Le, & Donnelly, 2008

Species of lizard

Petracola waka is a species of lizard in the family Gymnophthalmidae. It is endemic to Peru.
