= Macropholidus ruthveni =

Conservation status
- Least Concern (IUCN 3.1)

Scientific classification
- Kingdom: Animalia
- Phylum: Chordata
- Class: Reptilia
- Order: Squamata
- Family: Gymnophthalmidae
- Genus: Macropholidus
- Species: M. ruthveni

Binomial name
- Macropholidus ruthveni Noble, 1921

Species of lizard

Macropholidus ruthveni, known commonly as Ruthven's macropholidus, is a species of lizard in the family Gymnophthalmidae. The species is endemic to northwestern South America.

== Etymology ==
The specific name, ruthveni, is in honor of American herpetologist Alexander Grant Ruthven.

== Geographic range ==
M. ruthveni is found in Ecuador and Peru.

== Habitat ==
The preferred natural habitat of M. ruthveni is forest, at altitudes of 1,400–2,250 m (4,590–7,380 ft).

== Reproduction ==
M. ruthveni is oviparous.
