= Yanomamia hoogmoedi =

Conservation status
- Least Concern (IUCN 3.1)

Scientific classification
- Kingdom: Animalia
- Phylum: Chordata
- Class: Reptilia
- Order: Squamata
- Family: Gymnophthalmidae
- Genus: Yanomamia
- Species: Y. hoogmoedi

Binomial name
- Yanomamia hoogmoedi (Kok, 2008)

Synonyms
- Arthrosaura hoogmoedi Kok, 2008; Loxopholis hoogmoedi — Goicoechea et al., 2016; Yanomamia hoogmoedi — Pellegrino et al., 2018

Species of lizard

Yanomamia hoogmoedi is a species of lizard in the family Gymnophthalmidae. The species is endemic to Guyana.

== Etymology ==
The specific name, hoogmoedi, is in honor of Dutch herpetologist Marinus Steven Hoogmoed.

== Habitat ==
The preferred natural habitat of Y. hoogmoedi is forest, at altitudes around 2,100 m (6,900 ft).

== Reproduction ==
Y. hoogmoedi is oviparous.
