= Selvasaura almendarizae =

Scientific classification
- Kingdom: Animalia
- Phylum: Chordata
- Class: Reptilia
- Order: Squamata
- Family: Gymnophthalmidae
- Genus: Selvasaura
- Species: S. almendarizae

Binomial name
- Selvasaura almendarizae Torres-Carvajal, Parra, Sales-Nunes, & Koch, 2021

Species of reptile

Selvasaura almendarizae, Almendáriz's microtegu, occurs in Ecuador.
