= Tretioscincus agilis =

Conservation status
- Least Concern (IUCN 3.1)

Scientific classification
- Kingdom: Animalia
- Phylum: Chordata
- Class: Reptilia
- Order: Squamata
- Suborder: Lacertoidea
- Family: Gymnophthalmidae
- Genus: Tretioscincus
- Species: T. agilis

Binomial name
- Tretioscincus agilis (Ruthven, 1916)

Species of lizard

Tretioscincus agilis, the smooth tegu, is a species of lizard in the family Gymnophthalmidae. It is found in Guyana, Suriname, French Guiana, Brazil, Venezuela, and Colombia.
