= Marinussaurus =

Scientific classification
- Kingdom: Animalia
- Phylum: Chordata
- Class: Reptilia
- Order: Squamata
- Family: Gymnophthalmidae
- Genus: Marinussaurus; Peloso, Pellegrino, Rodrigues, & Ávila-Pires, 2011
- Species: M. curupira

Binomial name
- Marinussaurus curupira Peloso, Pellegrino, Rodrigues, & Ávila-Pires, 2011

Genus of lizards

Marinussaurus is a genus of the lizard family Gymnophthalmidae. The genus is monotypic, i.e. it has only one species, Marinussaurus curupira. It occurs in Brazil. The specific name is given after the Curupira, a mythological creature known from many regions in South America (e.g., Brazil, Argentina, Chile, Paraguay, and Uruguay)
