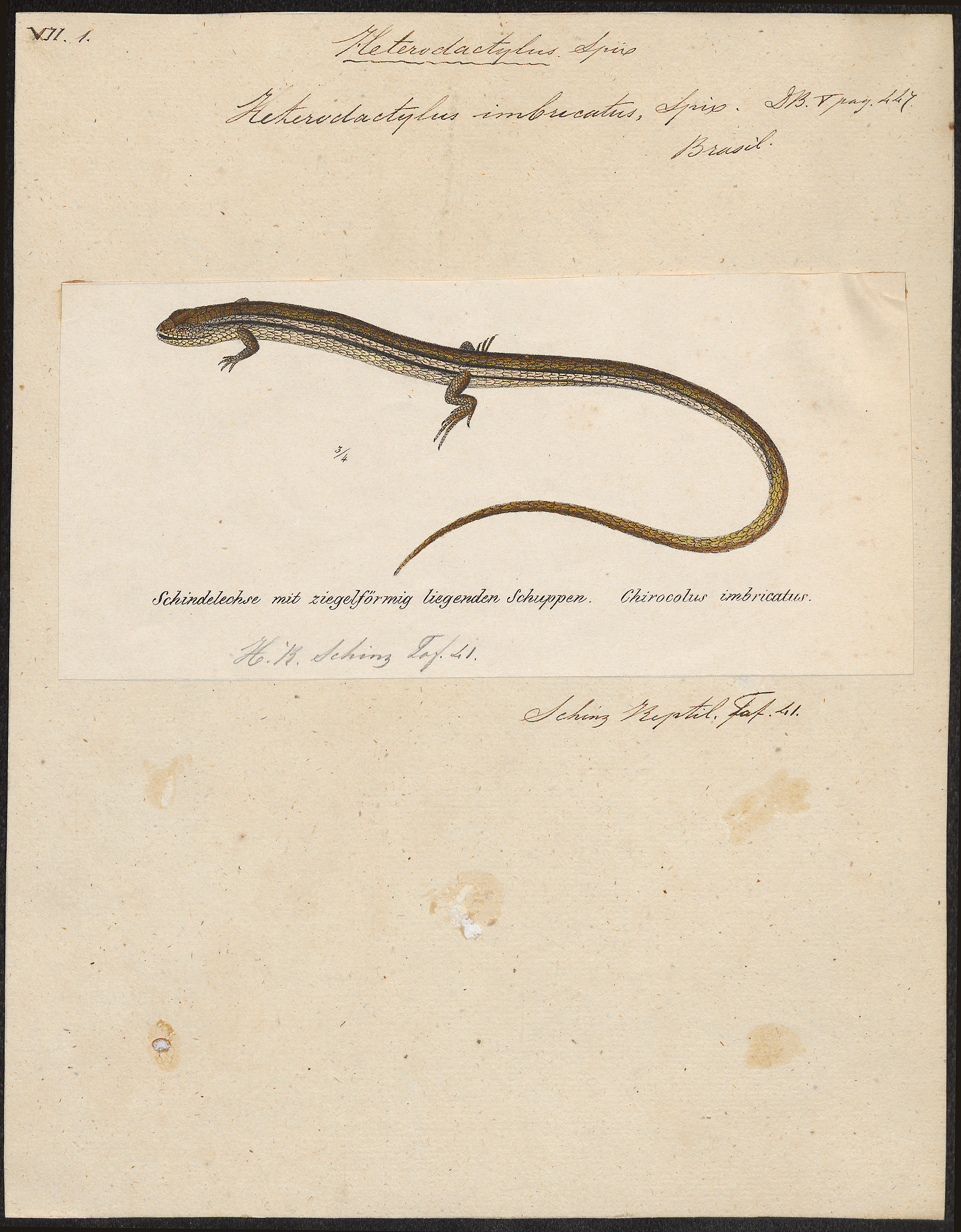

Conservation status
- Least Concern (IUCN 3.1)

Scientific classification
- Kingdom: Animalia
- Phylum: Chordata
- Class: Reptilia
- Order: Squamata
- Suborder: Lacertoidea
- Family: Gymnophthalmidae
- Genus: Heterodactylus
- Species: H. imbricatus

Binomial name
- Heterodactylus imbricatus Spix, 1825

= Heterodactylus imbricatus =

Species of lizard

Heterodactylus imbricatus, the Rio de Janeiro teiid, is a species of lizard in the family Gymnophthalmidae. It is endemic to Brazil.
