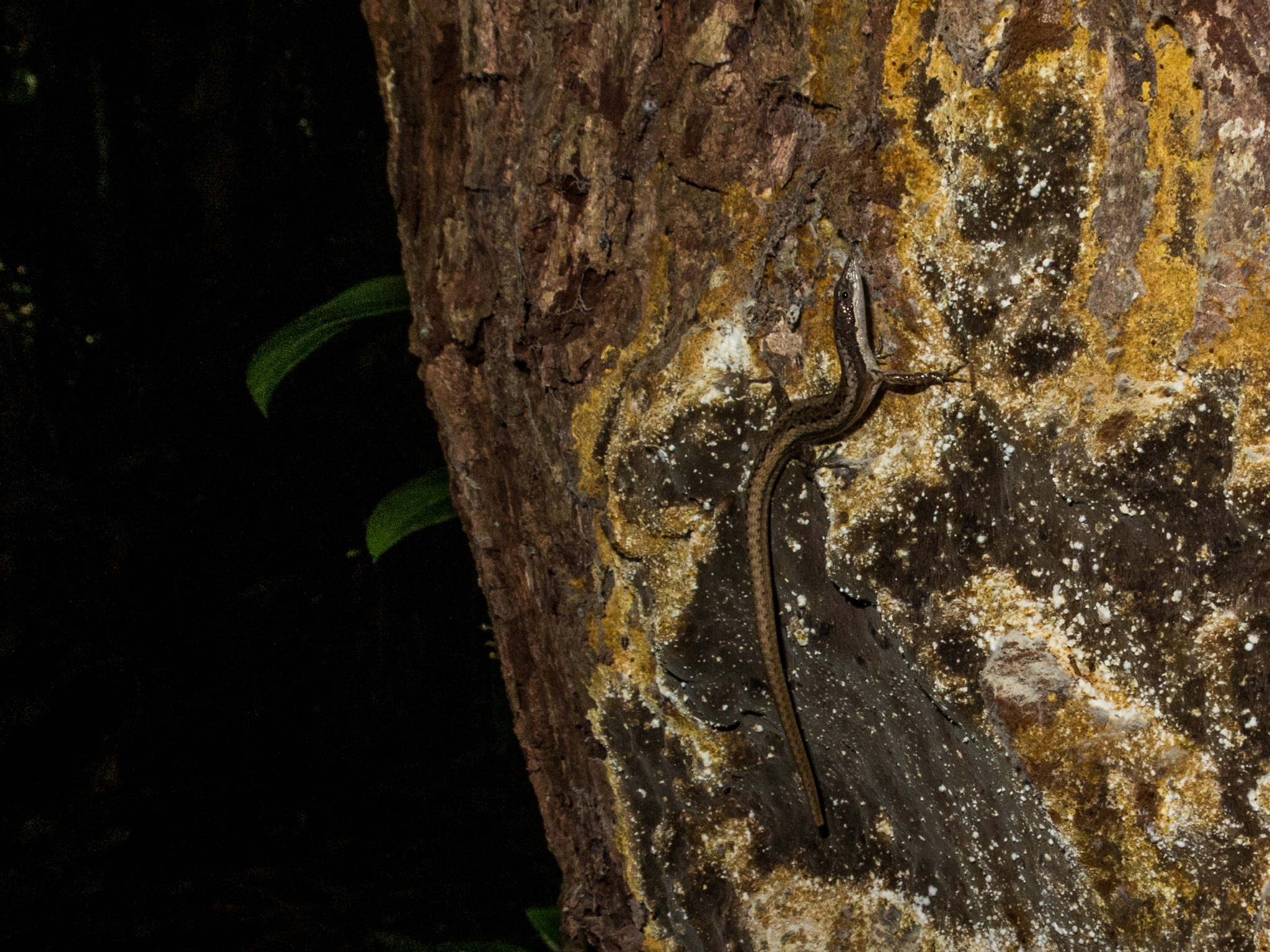

Conservation status
- Least Concern (IUCN 3.1)

Scientific classification
- Kingdom: Animalia
- Phylum: Chordata
- Class: Reptilia
- Order: Squamata
- Family: Gymnophthalmidae
- Genus: Placosoma
- Species: P. cordylinum

Binomial name
- Placosoma cordylinum Tschudi, 1847

Synonyms
- Ecpleopus lutzae Loveridge, 1944; Elaphrosaura spitzi Amaral; Euspondylus cupreus Andersson, 1916; Prionodactylus champsonotus Werner, 1910

= Placosoma cordylinum =

Species of lizard

Placosoma cordylinum is a species of lizard in the family Gymnophthalmidae. It is endemic to Brazil.
