= Nothobachia =

Conservation status
- Least Concern (IUCN 3.1)

Scientific classification
- Kingdom: Animalia
- Phylum: Chordata
- Class: Reptilia
- Order: Squamata
- Family: Gymnophthalmidae
- Genus: Nothobachia; Rodrigues, 1984
- Species: N. ablephara

Binomial name
- Nothobachia ablephara Rodrigues, 1984

Genus of lizards

Nothobachia is a genus of lizards. It is monotypic with Nothobachia ablephara as the sole species. It is endemic to Bahia state of eastern Brazil.
