= Petracola labioocularis =

Conservation status
- Data Deficient (IUCN 3.1)

Scientific classification
- Kingdom: Animalia
- Phylum: Chordata
- Class: Reptilia
- Order: Squamata
- Family: Gymnophthalmidae
- Genus: Petracola
- Species: P. labioocularis

Binomial name
- Petracola labioocularis (Köhler & Lehr, 2004)

Species of lizard

Petracola labioocularis is a species of lizard in the family Gymnophthalmidae. It is endemic to Peru.
