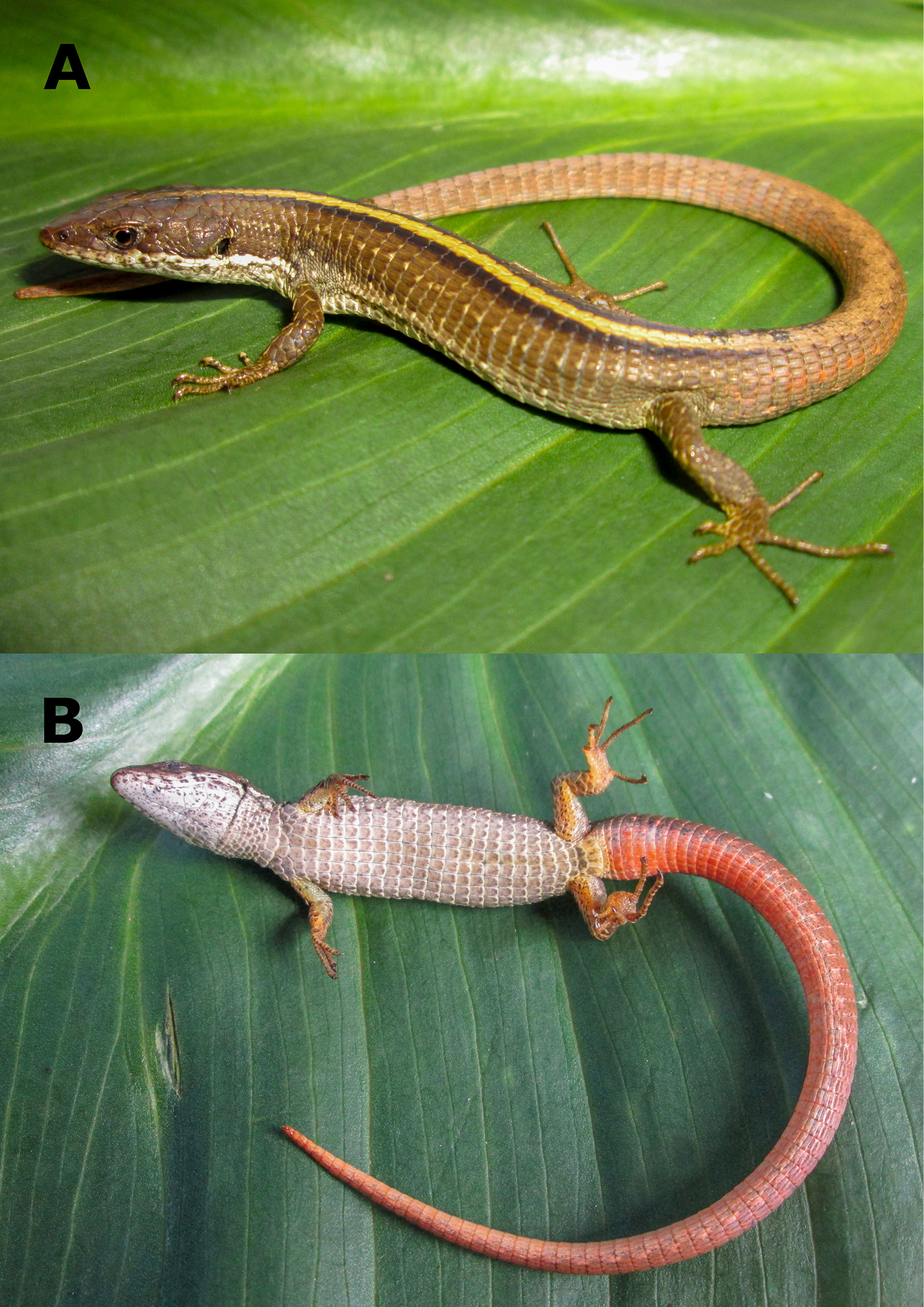

Scientific classification
- Kingdom: Animalia
- Phylum: Chordata
- Class: Reptilia
- Order: Squamata
- Family: Gymnophthalmidae
- Genus: Selvasaura
- Species: S. evasa

Binomial name
- Selvasaura evasa Echevarría, Venegas, García-Ayachi, & Sales-Nunes, 2021

= Selvasaura evasa =

Species of lizard

Selvasaura evasa, the elusive microtegu, occurs in Peru.
