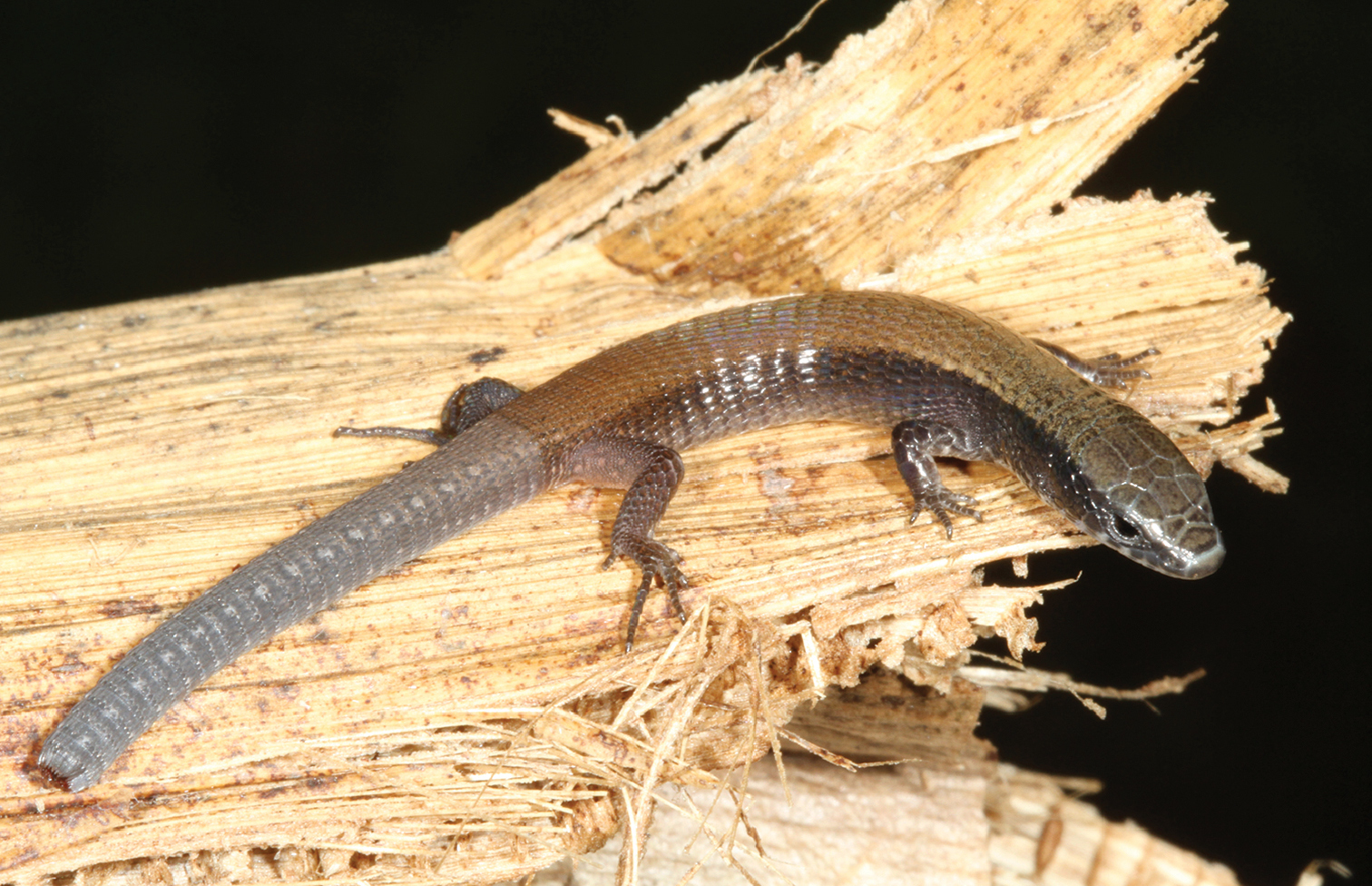

Scientific classification
- Kingdom: Animalia
- Phylum: Chordata
- Class: Reptilia
- Order: Squamata
- Suborder: Lacertoidea
- Family: Gymnophthalmidae
- Genus: Colobosaura
- Species: C. kraepelini

Binomial name
- Colobosaura kraepelini (Werner, 1910)

= Colobosaura kraepelini =

Species of lizard

Colobosaura kraepelini, the Chaco colobosaura, is a species of lizard in the family Gymnophthalmidae. It is endemic to Paraguay.
