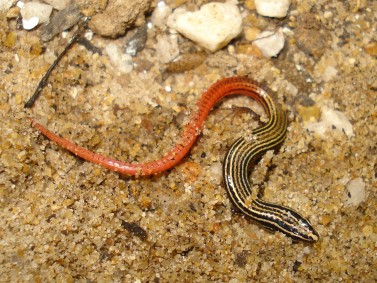

Conservation status
- Least Concern (IUCN 3.1)

Scientific classification
- Kingdom: Animalia
- Phylum: Chordata
- Class: Reptilia
- Order: Squamata
- Suborder: Lacertoidea
- Family: Gymnophthalmidae
- Genus: Vanzosaura
- Species: V. rubricauda

Binomial name
- Vanzosaura rubricauda (Boulenger, 1902)

= Vanzosaura rubricauda =

Species of lizard

Vanzosaura rubricauda, the red-tailed vanzosaur or redtail tegu, is a non-venomous species of lizard in the family Gymnophthalmidae. It is found in Bolivia, Argentina, Paraguay, and Brazil.
