= Yanomamia =

Scientific classification
- Kingdom: Animalia
- Phylum: Chordata
- Class: Reptilia
- Order: Squamata
- Family: Gymnophthalmidae
- Genus: Yanomamia; Pellegrino, Brunes, Souza, Laguna, Ávila-Pires, Hoogmoed, & Rodrigues, 2018

Genus of lizards

Yanomamia is a genus of lizards in the family Gymnophthalmidae. The genus is endemic to Guyana.

== Species ==
The genus Yanomamia contains two accepted species.

- Yanomamia guianensis (MacCulloch & Lathrop, 2001)
- Yanomamia hoogmoedi (Kok, 2008)

Nota bene: A binomial authority in parentheses indicates that the species was originally described in a genus other than Yanomamia.
