= Micrablepharus maximiliani =

Conservation status
- Least Concern (IUCN 3.1)

Scientific classification
- Kingdom: Animalia
- Phylum: Chordata
- Class: Reptilia
- Order: Squamata
- Family: Gymnophthalmidae
- Genus: Micrablepharus
- Species: M. maximiliani

Binomial name
- Micrablepharus maximiliani (Reinhardt & Lütken, 1862)

Synonyms
- Gymnophthalmus maximiliani Reinhardt & Lütken, 1862; Micrablepharus glaucurus Boettger, 1885; Micrablepharus dunni Laurent, 1949

Species of lizard

Micrablepharus maximiliani is a species of lizard in the family Gymnophthalmidae. The species is native to South America.

== Etymology ==
The specific name, maximiliani, is in honor of German naturalist Prince Maximilian of Wied-Neuwied.

== Description ==
Dorsally, Micrablepharus maximiliani has a brass-colored head and body, and a bright blue tail. Each front foot has only four digits, lacking a "thumb".

== Geographic distribution ==
Micrablepharus maximiliani is found in Bolivia, Brazil, Paraguay, and Peru.

== Habitat ==
The preferred natural habitats of Micrablepharus maximiliani are forest and savanna.
