= Petracola pajatensis =

Scientific classification
- Kingdom: Animalia
- Phylum: Chordata
- Class: Reptilia
- Order: Squamata
- Family: Gymnophthalmidae
- Genus: Petracola
- Species: P. pajatensis

Binomial name
- Petracola pajatensis Rodríguez & Mamani, 2020

Species of lizard

Petracola pajatensis is a species of lizard in the family Gymnophthalmidae. It is endemic to Peru.
