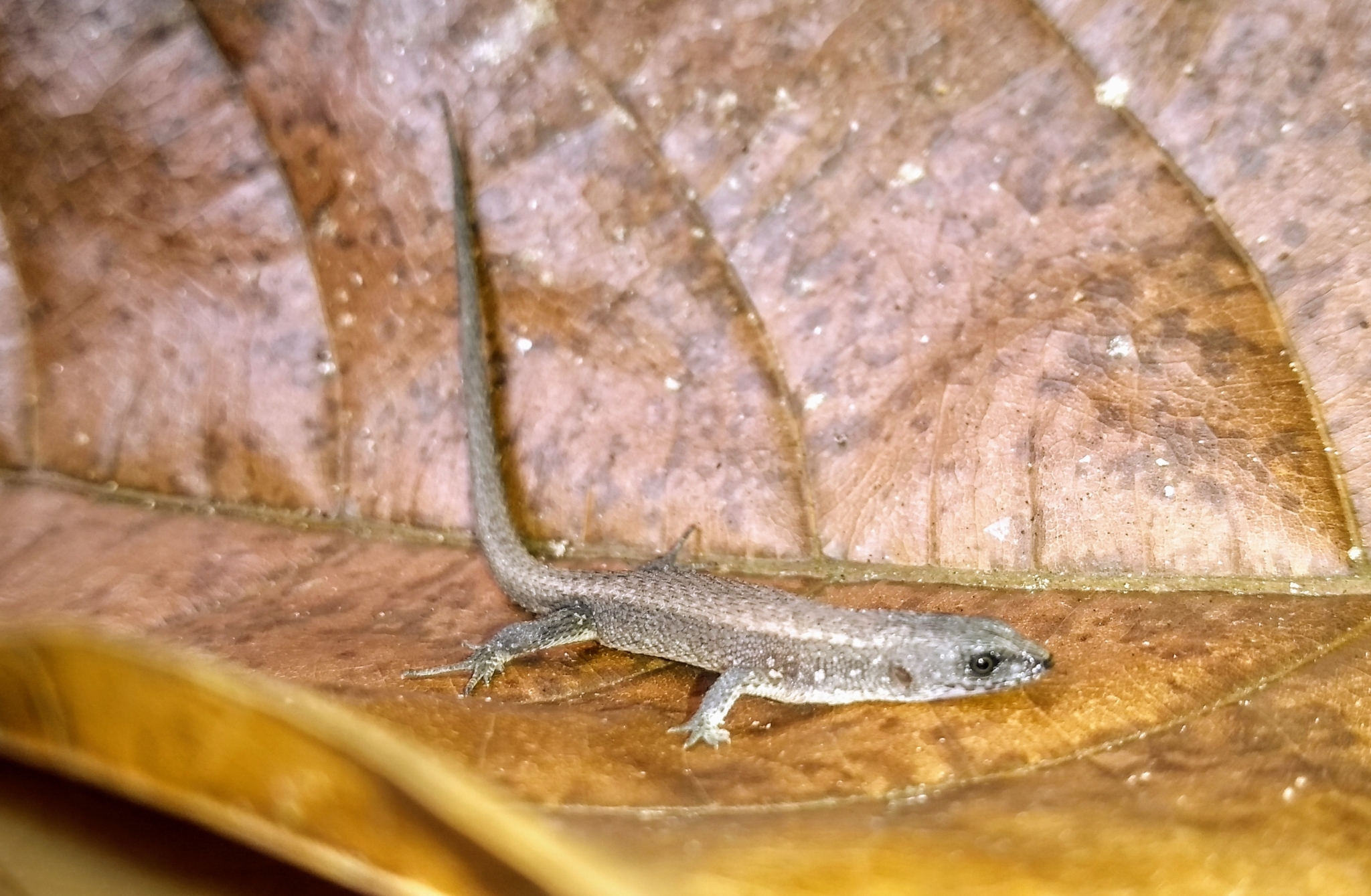

Conservation status
- Least Concern (IUCN 3.1)

Scientific classification
- Kingdom: Animalia
- Phylum: Chordata
- Class: Reptilia
- Order: Squamata
- Suborder: Lacertoidea
- Family: Gymnophthalmidae
- Genus: Leposoma
- Species: L. scincoides

Binomial name
- Leposoma scincoides Spix, 1825

= Skink tegu =

Species of lizard

The skink tegu (Leposoma scincoides) is a species of lizard in the family Gymnophthalmidae. It is endemic to Brazil.
