= Scriptosaura =

Conservation status
- Least Concern (IUCN 3.1)

Scientific classification
- Kingdom: Animalia
- Phylum: Chordata
- Class: Reptilia
- Order: Squamata
- Family: Gymnophthalmidae
- Genus: Scriptosaura; Rodrigues & dos Santos, 2008
- Species: S. catimbau

Binomial name
- Scriptosaura catimbau Rodrigues & dos Santos, 2008

Genus of lizards

Scriptosaura is a genus of the lizard family Gymnophthalmidae. The genus is monotypic, i.e. it has only one species, Scriptosaura catimbau. It occurs in Brazil.
