= Caparaonia =

Conservation status
- Least Concern (IUCN 3.1)

Scientific classification
- Kingdom: Animalia
- Phylum: Chordata
- Class: Reptilia
- Order: Squamata
- Family: Gymnophthalmidae
- Tribe: Heterodactylini
- Genus: Caparaonia; Rodrigues, Cassimiro, Pavan, Curcio, Verdade, & Machado Pellegrino, 2009
- Species: C. itaiquara

Binomial name
- Caparaonia itaiquara Rodrigues, Cassimiro, Pavan, Curcio, Kruth Verdade, & Machado Pellegrino, 2009

Genus of lizards

Caparaonia is a genus of the lizard in family Gymnophthalmidae. The genus is monotypic, i.e. it has only one species, Caparaonia itaiquara. It is endemic to Brazil and is known from the Caparaó National Park on the border between Minas Gerais and Espírito Santo states.
