= Macropholidus huancabambae =

Scientific classification
- Kingdom: Animalia
- Phylum: Chordata
- Class: Reptilia
- Order: Squamata
- Family: Gymnophthalmidae
- Genus: Macropholidus
- Species: M. huancabambae

Binomial name
- Macropholidus huancabambae (Reeder, 1996)

Species of lizard

Macropholidus huancabambae is a species of lizard in the family Gymnophthalmidae. It is endemic to Peru.
