= Leposoma annectans =

Scientific classification
- Domain: Eukaryota
- Kingdom: Animalia
- Phylum: Chordata
- Class: Reptilia
- Order: Squamata
- Family: Gymnophthalmidae
- Genus: Leposoma
- Species: L. annectans

Binomial name
- Leposoma annectans Ruibal, 1952

Species of lizard

Leposoma annectans is a species of lizard in the family Gymnophthalmidae. It is endemic to Brazil.
