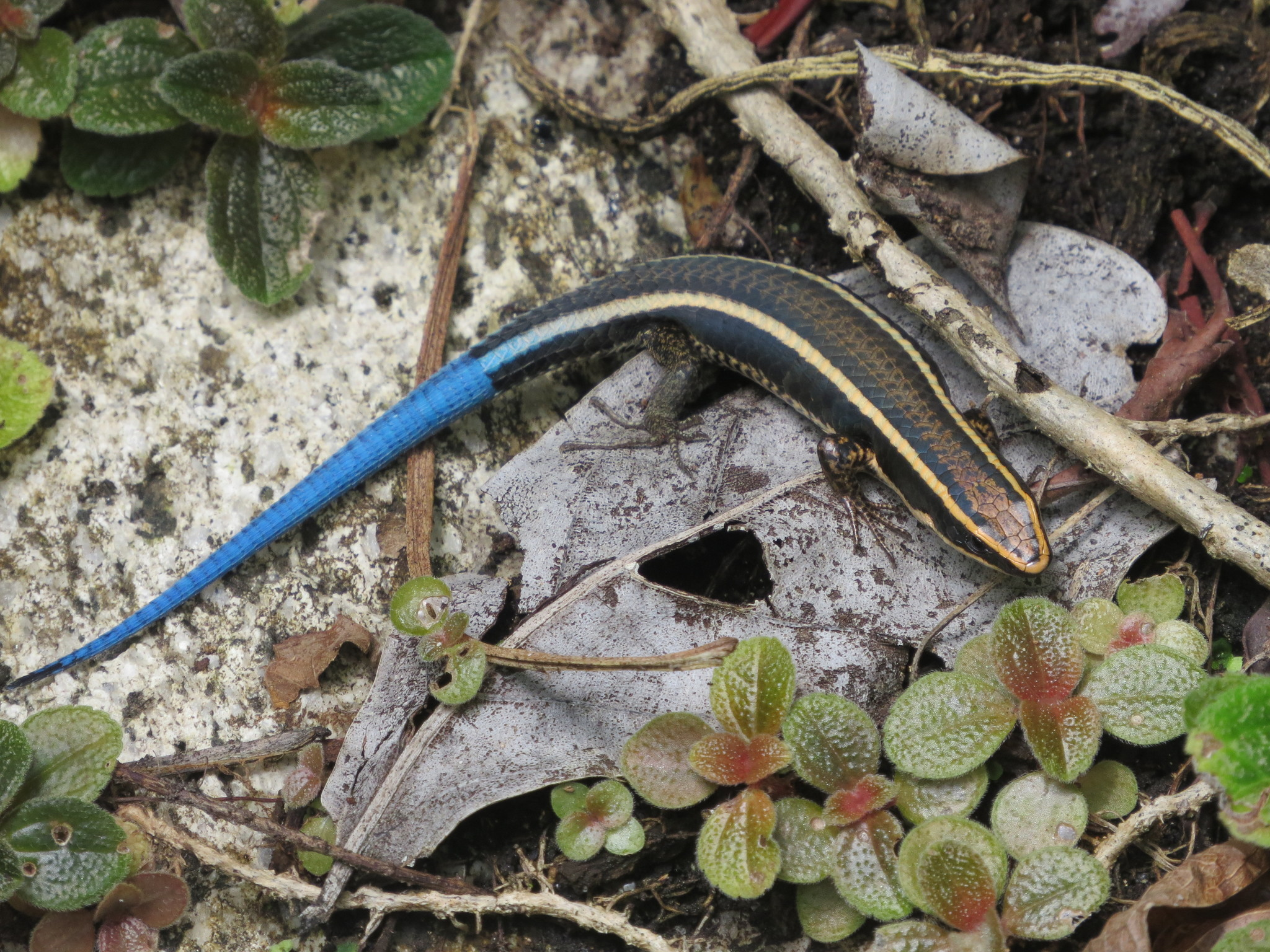

Conservation status
- Least Concern (IUCN 3.1)

Scientific classification
- Domain: Eukaryota
- Kingdom: Animalia
- Phylum: Chordata
- Class: Reptilia
- Order: Squamata
- Family: Gymnophthalmidae
- Genus: Tretioscincus
- Species: T. bifasciatus

Binomial name
- Tretioscincus bifasciatus (Duméril, 1851)

= Tretioscincus bifasciatus =

Species of lizard

Tretioscincus bifasciatus, the Rio Magdalena tegu, is a species of lizard in the family Gymnophthalmidae. It is found in Suriname, French Guiana, Venezuela, Margarita Island, Aruba, Curaçao, Bonaire, and Colombia.
