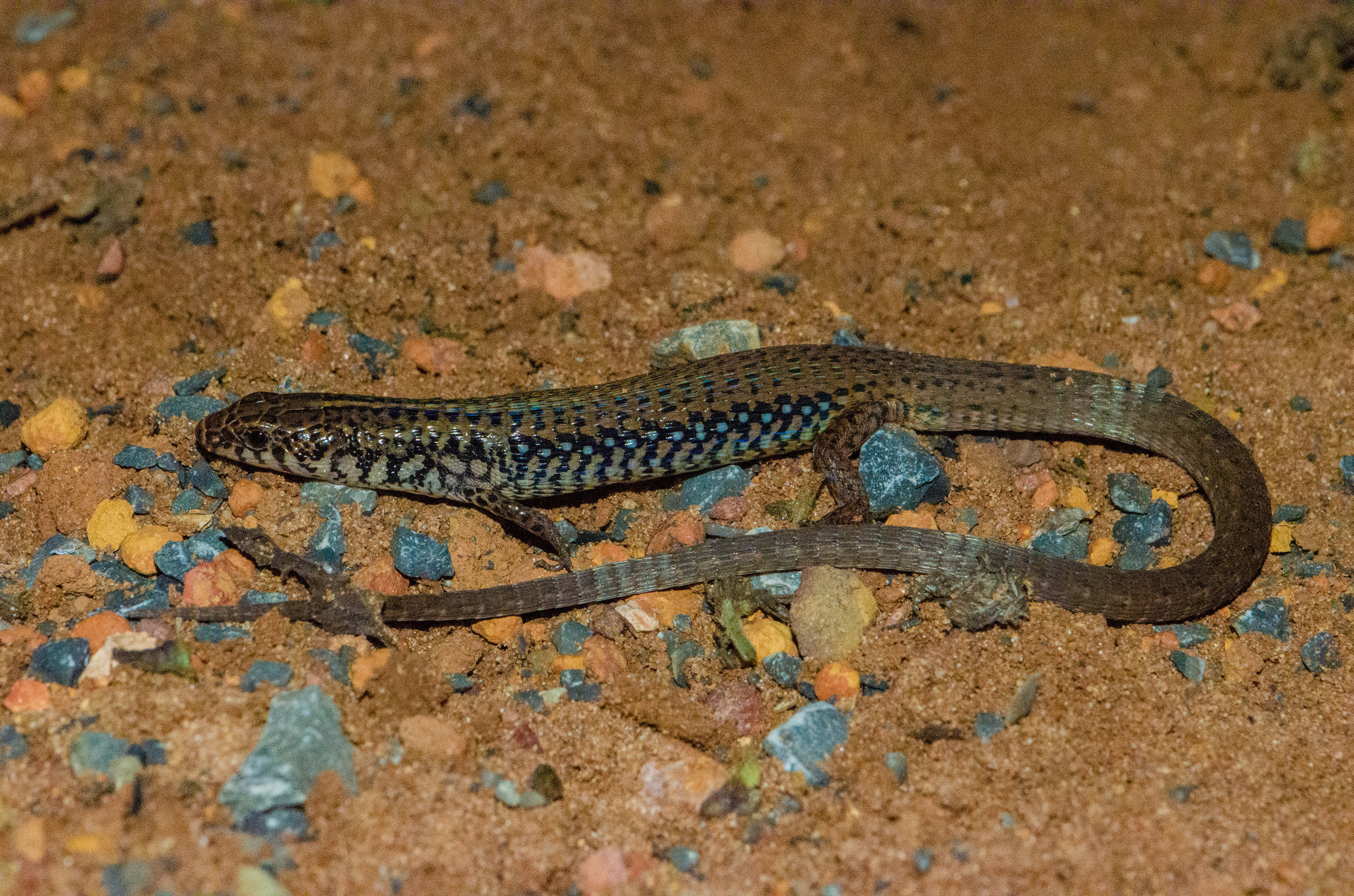

Conservation status
- Least Concern (IUCN 3.1)

Scientific classification
- Kingdom: Animalia
- Phylum: Chordata
- Class: Reptilia
- Order: Squamata
- Family: Gymnophthalmidae
- Genus: Acratosaura
- Species: A. mentalis

Binomial name
- Acratosaura mentalis Amaral, 1933

= Acratosaura mentalis =

Species of lizard

Acratosaura mentalis, Amaral's colobosaura, is a species of lizard in the family Gymnophthalmidae. It is endemic to Brazil.
