= Placosoma cipoense =

Conservation status
- Endangered (IUCN 3.1)

Scientific classification
- Kingdom: Animalia
- Phylum: Chordata
- Class: Reptilia
- Order: Squamata
- Family: Gymnophthalmidae
- Genus: Placosoma
- Species: P. cipoense

Binomial name
- Placosoma cipoense Cunha, 1966

Species of lizard

Placosoma cipoense, Cunha's Brazilian lizard, is a species of lizard in the family Gymnophthalmidae. It is endemic to Brazil, in the Serra do Espinhaço of Minas Gerais. It is threatened by habitat degradation as a result of fires, cattle raising, urbanization and mining.
