= Calyptommatus =

Scientific classification
- Kingdom: Animalia
- Phylum: Chordata
- Class: Reptilia
- Order: Squamata
- Family: Gymnophthalmidae
- Tribe: Gymnophthalmini
- Genus: Calyptommatus; Rodrigues, 1991

Type species
- Calyptommatus sinebrachiatus Rodrigues, 1991

Diversity
- 5 species (see text)

Genus of lizards

Calyptommatus is a genus of Brazilian lizards in the family Gymnophthalmidae.

The genus shows extreme reduction of hind limbs and absence of fore limbs. Also prefrontals, frontals, supraoculars, and frontoparietals are absent.

== Species ==
There are five species:

- Calyptommatus confusionibus Rodrigues, Zaher, and Curcio, 2001
- Calyptommatus frontalis Recoder, Marques-Souza, Silva-Soares, Ramiro, Castro, & Rodrigues, 2022
- Calyptommatus leiolepis Rodrigues, 1991
- Calyptommatus nicterus Rodrigues, 1991
- Calyptommatus sinebrachiatus Rodrigues, 1991
