= Heterodactylus lundii =

Conservation status
- Endangered (IUCN 3.1)

Scientific classification
- Kingdom: Animalia
- Phylum: Chordata
- Class: Reptilia
- Order: Squamata
- Family: Gymnophthalmidae
- Genus: Heterodactylus
- Species: H. lundii

Binomial name
- Heterodactylus lundii Reinhardt & Lütken, 1862

Species of lizard

Heterodactylus lundii, also known commonly as Lund's teiid, is an endangered species of lizard in the family Gymnophthalmidae. The species is endemic to Brazil.

== Etymology ==
The specific name, lundii, is in honor of Danish paleontologist Peter Wilhelm Lund.

== Description ==
Heterodactylus lundii has an elongated body and very small legs. It may attain a snout-to-vent length (SVL) of 6 cm (2.4 in). The tail length is about twice the SVL.

== Geographic range ==
Heterodactylus lundii is found in the Brazilian state of Minas Gerais.

== Habitat ==
The preferred natural habitat of Heterodactylus lundii is savanna, at altitudes of 900–1,300 m (3,000–4,300 ft).

== Behavior ==
Heterodactylus lundii is terrestrial and fossorial.

== Reproduction ==
Heterodactylus lundii is oviparous. Clutch size is only two eggs.
