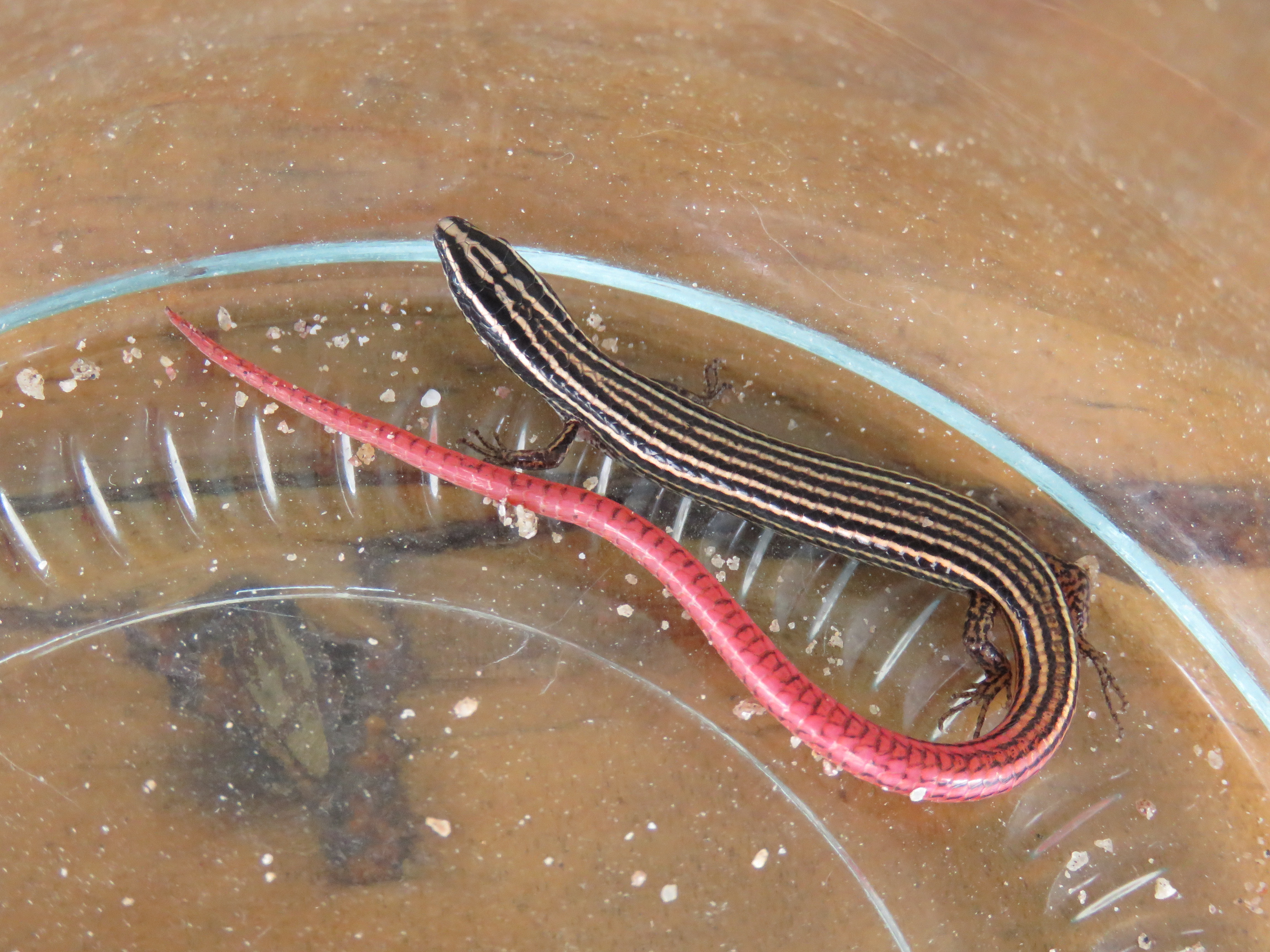

Conservation status
- Least Concern (IUCN 3.1)

Scientific classification
- Kingdom: Animalia
- Phylum: Chordata
- Class: Reptilia
- Order: Squamata
- Family: Gymnophthalmidae
- Genus: Vanzosaura
- Species: V. multiscutata

Binomial name
- Vanzosaura multiscutata (Amaral, 1933)

= Vanzosaura multiscutata =

Species of lizard

Vanzosaura multiscutata (Brazilian common names: Calango-do-Rabo-Vermelho and Piolho-de-Cobra) is a species of lizard in the family Gymnophthalmidae. It is a small lizard (snout–vent length less than 3.8cm) endemic to Brazil. It is found in Caatinga and Restinga regions, mostly in sandy or rocky places and feeds on arthropods.
