= Rondonops =

Scientific classification
- Kingdom: Animalia
- Phylum: Chordata
- Class: Reptilia
- Order: Squamata
- Family: Gymnophthalmidae
- Genus: Rondonops; Colli, Hoogmoed, Cannatella, Cassimiro, Gomes, Ghellere, Sales Nunes, Pellegrino, Salerno, Marques De Souza, & Rodrigues (2015)

Genus of lizards

Rondonops is a genus of lizards in the family Gymnophthalmidae. The genus is endemic to Brazil.

== Species ==
The genus Rondonops contains 2 species which are recognized as being valid.

- Rondonops biscutatus Colli et al., 2015
- Rondonops xanthomystax Colli et al., 2015

Nota bene: A binomial authority in parentheses indicates that the species was originally described in a genus other than Rondonops.
