= Yanomamia guianensis =

Conservation status
- Least Concern (IUCN 3.1)

Scientific classification
- Kingdom: Animalia
- Phylum: Chordata
- Class: Reptilia
- Order: Squamata
- Family: Gymnophthalmidae
- Genus: Yanomamia
- Species: Y. guianensis

Binomial name
- Yanomamia guianensis (MacCulloch & Lathrop, 2001)

Synonyms
- Arthrosaura guianensis MacCulloch and Lathrop, 2001; Loxopholis guianensis Goicoeche et al., 2016

Species of lizard

Yanomamia guianensis is a species of lizard in the family Gymnophthalmidae. It has been found only at higher elevations on Mount Ayanganna and Mount Roraima in west-central Guyana.
