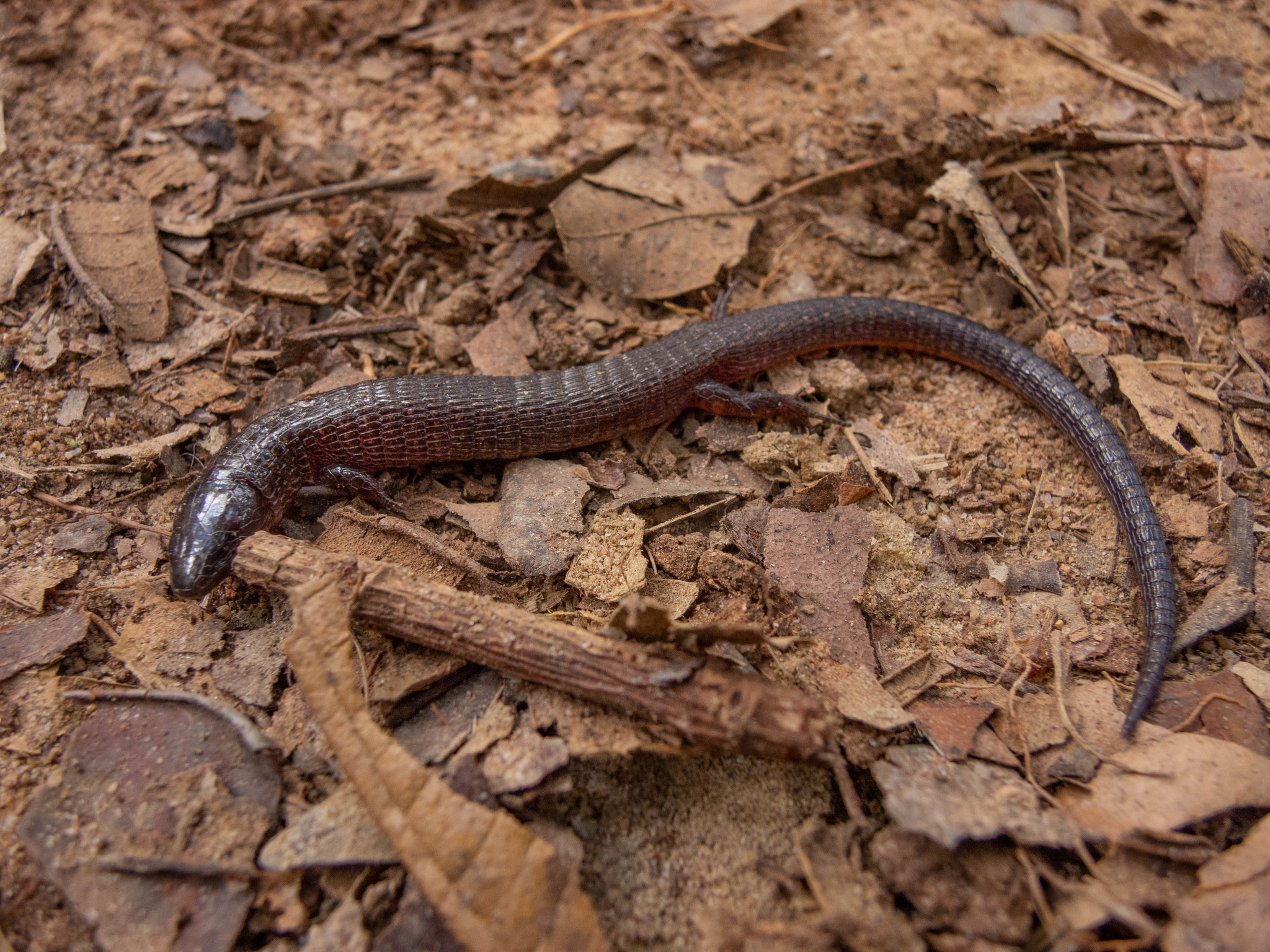
- In Brazil

Scientific classification
- Kingdom: Animalia
- Phylum: Chordata
- Class: Reptilia
- Order: Squamata
- Family: Gymnophthalmidae
- Genus: Dryadosaura; Rodrigues, Freire, Pellegrino & Sites, 2005
- Species: D. nordestina

Binomial name
- Dryadosaura nordestina Rodrigues, Freire, Pellegrino, & Sites, 2005

= Dryadosaura =

Genus of lizards

Dryadosaura is a genus of the lizard family Gymnophthalmidae. The genus is monotypic, i.e. it has only one species, Dryadosaura nordestina. It occurs in Brazil.
