= Psilops =

Scientific classification
- Kingdom: Animalia
- Phylum: Chordata
- Class: Reptilia
- Order: Squamata
- Family: Gymnophthalmidae
- Genus: Psilops; Rodrigues et al., 2017

Genus of lizards

Psilops is a genus of lizards in the family Gymnophthalmidae. They are endemic to Brazil.

== Species ==
- Psilops mucugensis Rodrigues et al., 2017
- Psilops paeminosus Rodrigues, 1991
- Psilops seductus Rodrigues et al., 2017
