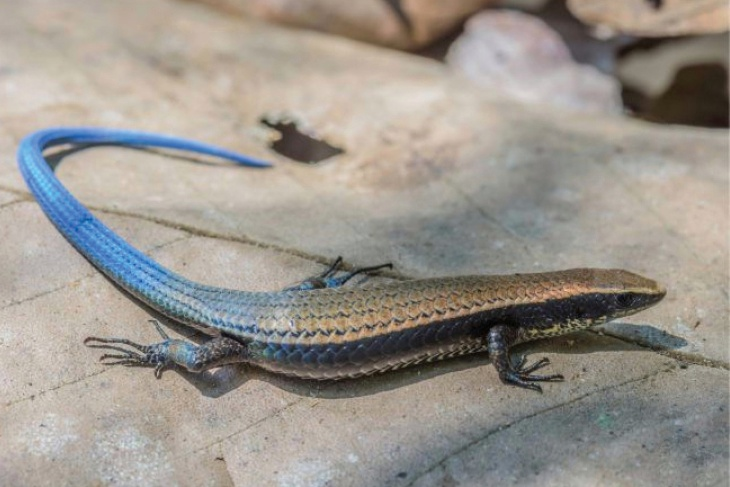
- Tretioscincus oriximinensis

Scientific classification
- Domain: Eukaryota
- Kingdom: Animalia
- Phylum: Chordata
- Class: Reptilia
- Order: Squamata
- Family: Gymnophthalmidae
- Tribe: Gymnophthalmini
- Genus: Tretioscincus; Cope, 1862

= Tretioscincus =

Genus of lizards

The genus Tretioscincus contains 3 species which are recognized as being valid.

- Tretioscincus agilis (Ruthven, 1916) – smooth tegu
- Tretioscincus bifasciatus (Duméril, 1851) – Rio Magdalena tegu
- Tretioscincus oriximinensis Avila-Pires, 1995 – Oriximina lizard
