= Leposoma =

Scientific classification
- Kingdom: Animalia
- Phylum: Chordata
- Class: Reptilia
- Order: Squamata
- Family: Gymnophthalmidae
- Tribe: Ecpleopodini
- Genus: Leposoma; Spix, 1825

Genus of lizards

Leposoma is a genus of South American lizards in the family Gymnophthalmidae.

== Species ==
The following six species are recognized as being valid:

- Leposoma annectans Ruibal, 1952
- Leposoma baturitensis Rodrigues & Borges, 1997
- Leposoma nanodactylus Rodrigues, 1997
- Leposoma puk Rodrigues et al., 2002
- Leposoma scincoides Spix, 1825 - skink tegu
- Leposoma sinepollex Rodrigues et al., 2013
