= Macropholidus =

Scientific classification
- Kingdom: Animalia
- Phylum: Chordata
- Class: Reptilia
- Order: Squamata
- Family: Gymnophthalmidae
- Tribe: Cercosaurini
- Genus: Macropholidus; Noble, 1921

Genus of lizards

Macropholidus is a genus of lizards in the family Gymnophthalmidae. The genus is endemic to Ecuador and Peru.

== Species ==
The genus Macropholidus contains four species which are recognized as being valid.

- Macropholidus annectens Parker, 1930 - Parker's pholiodobolus
- Macropholidus ataktolepis Cadle & Chuna, 1995
- Macropholidus huancabambae (Reeder, 1996)
- Macropholidus montanuccii Torres-Carvajal, Venegas & Nunes, 2020 - Montanucci's cuilanes
- Macropholidus ruthveni Noble, 1921 - Ruthven's pholiodobolus

Nota bene: A binomial authority in parentheses indicates that the species was originally described in a genus other than Macropholidus.
