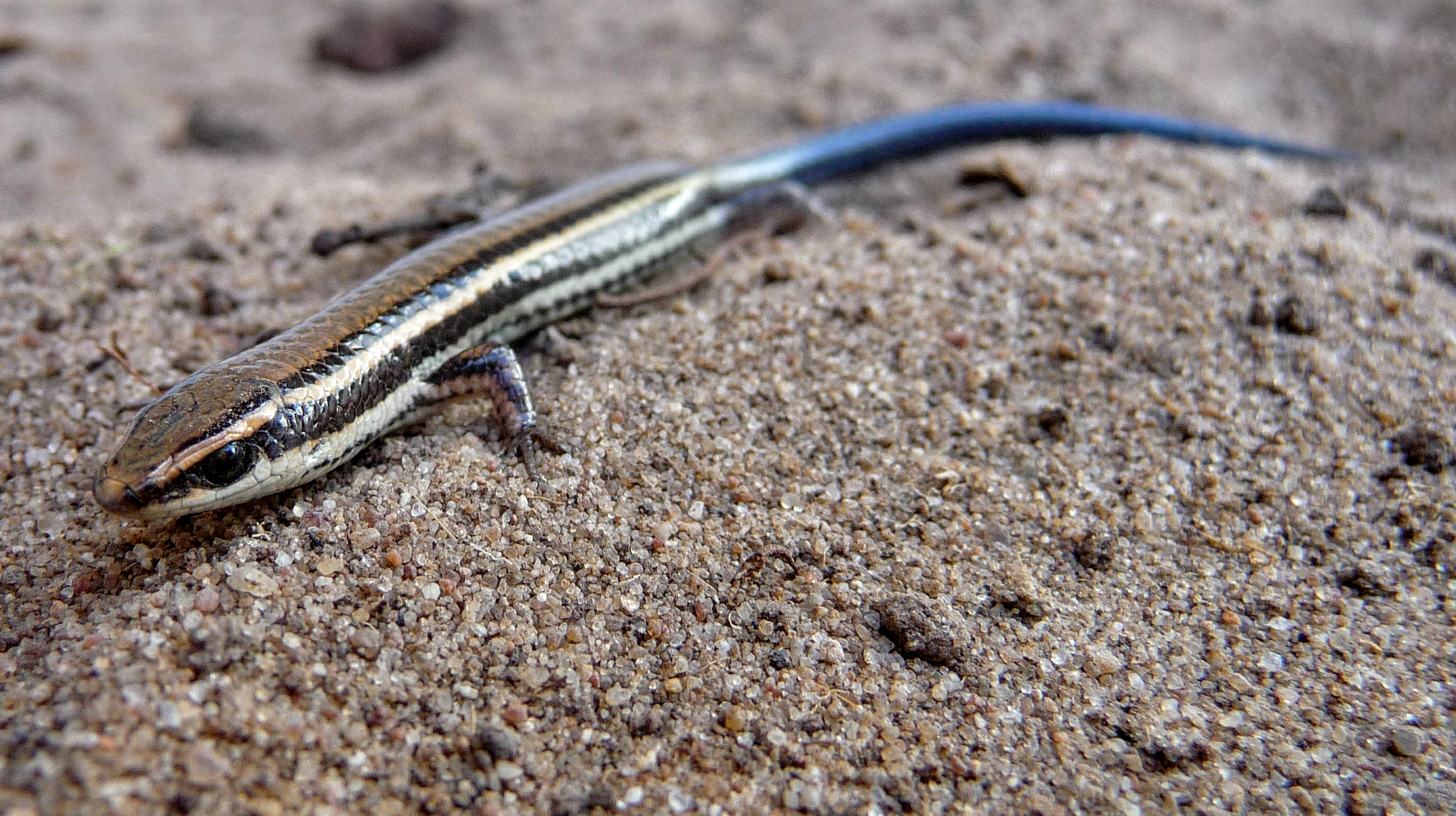
- Micrablepharus atticolus

Scientific classification
- Kingdom: Animalia
- Phylum: Chordata
- Class: Reptilia
- Order: Squamata
- Family: Gymnophthalmidae
- Tribe: Gymnophthalmini
- Genus: Micrablepharus; Boettger, 1885

= Micrablepharus =

Genus of lizards

Micrablepharus is a small genus of lizards endemic to South America.

== Species ==
There are two species:

- Micrablepharus atticolus Rodrigues, 1996
- Micrablepharus maximiliani (J.T. Reinhardt & Lütken, 1862)

Nota bene: A binomial authority in parentheses indicates that the species was originally described in a different genus, in this case a genus other than Micrablepharus.
