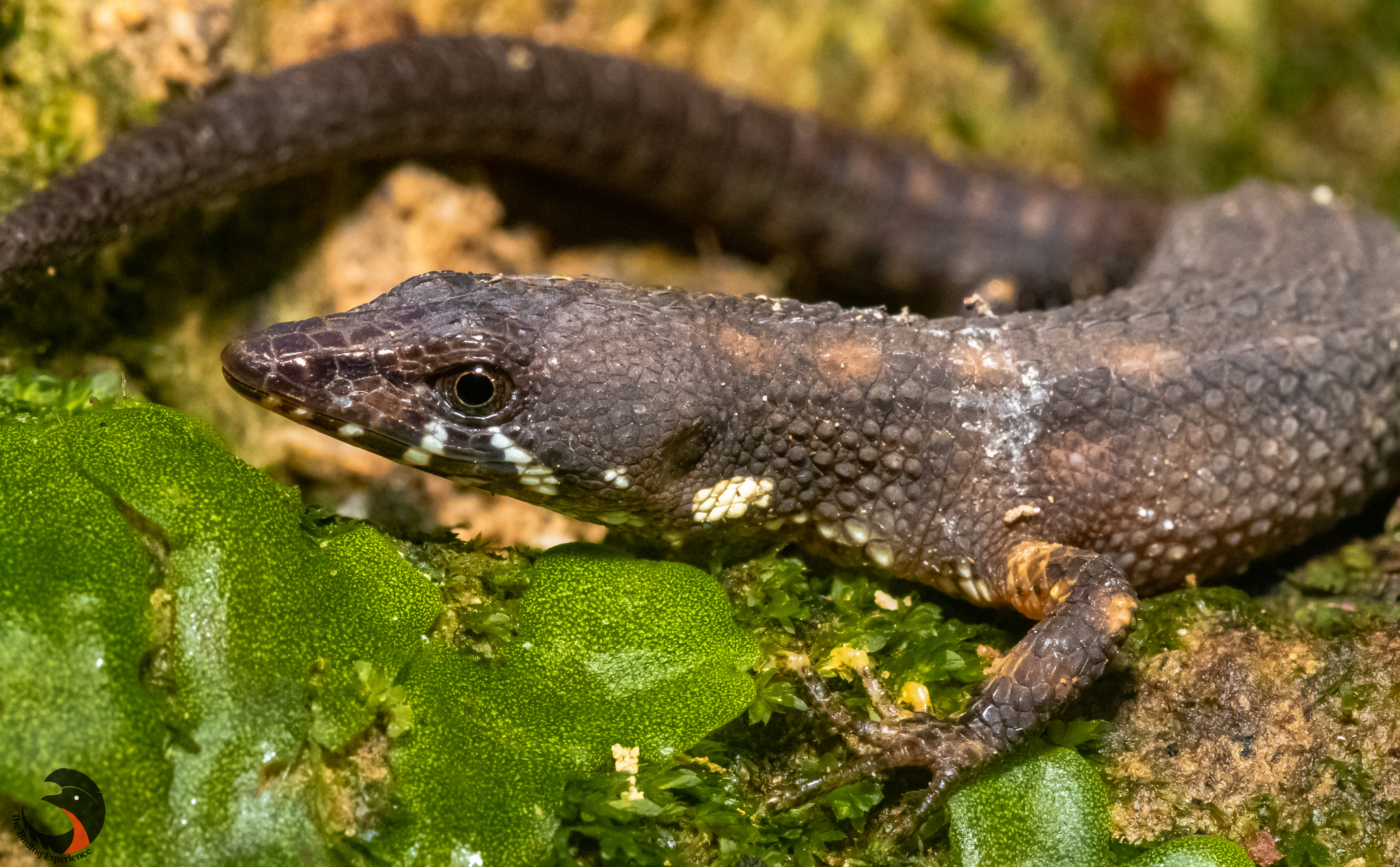

Conservation status
- Least Concern (IUCN 3.1)

Scientific classification
- Kingdom: Animalia
- Phylum: Chordata
- Class: Reptilia
- Order: Squamata
- Family: Gymnophthalmidae
- Genus: Centrosaura; Vásquez-Restrepo, Ibáñez, Sánchez-Pacheco, & Daza, 2019
- Species: C. apodema

Binomial name
- Centrosaura apodema (Uzzell, 1966)

Synonyms
- Echinosaura apodemus

= Centrosaura =

Species of lizard

Centrosaura apodema, Uzzell's neusticurus, is a species of lizard in the family Gymnophthalmidae. It is found in Costa Rica and Panama. It is monotypic in the genus Centrosaura.
