= Placosoma (lizard) =

Scientific classification
- Domain: Eukaryota
- Kingdom: Animalia
- Phylum: Chordata
- Class: Reptilia
- Order: Squamata
- Family: Gymnophthalmidae
- Tribe: Cercosaurini
- Genus: Placosoma; Fitzinger, 1847

Genus of lizards

Placosoma is a lizard genus in the family Gymnophthalmidae. They are endemic to southern Brazil.

== Species ==
- Placosoma cipoense Cunha, 1966 – Cunha's Brazilian lizard
- Placosoma cordylinum Tschudi, 1847
- Placosoma glabellum (Peters, 1870)
- Placosoma limaverdorum Borges-Nojosa, Caramaschi, & Rodrigues, 2016
