= Stenolepis =

Conservation status
- Least Concern (IUCN 3.1)

Scientific classification
- Kingdom: Animalia
- Phylum: Chordata
- Class: Reptilia
- Order: Squamata
- Family: Gymnophthalmidae
- Genus: Stenolepis; Boulenger, 1887
- Species: S. ridleyi

Binomial name
- Stenolepis ridleyi Boulenger, 1887

Genus of lizards

Stenolepis is a genus of lizard in the family Gymnophthalmidae, a family commonly known as microteiids or spectacled lizards. The genus Stenolepis contains a single species, Stenolepis ridleyi, commonly known as the Pernambuco teiid. The species is endemic to Brazil, and the common name refers to its type locality in Pernambuco state in northeast Brazil.

== Etymology ==
The specific name, ridleyi, is in honor of British botanist Henry Nicholas Ridley.

== Geographic range ==
S. ridleyi is found in the Brazilian states of Ceará and Pernambuco. The type locality given by Boulenger is "the forest of Iguarasse, Pernambuco".

== Habitat ==
The natural habitats of S. ridleyi are forest and Savanna.

== Reproduction ==
S. ridleyi is oviparous.
