= Magdalenasaura =

Scientific classification
- Kingdom: Animalia
- Phylum: Chordata
- Order: Squamata
- Family: Gymnophthalmidae
- Genus: Magdalenasaura; Fang, Vásquez-Restrepo, & Daza, 2020

Species
- M. adercum; M. leurosquama

Genus of lizards

Magdalenasaura is a genus of lizards in the family Gymnophthalmidae. The genus is exclusively endemic to the Cordillera Central in Colombia.

== Species ==
The genus Magdalenasaura contains two species: M. adercum and M. leurosquama.
