= Gelanesaurus =

Scientific classification
- Kingdom: Animalia
- Phylum: Chordata
- Class: Reptilia
- Order: Squamata
- Family: Gymnophthalmidae
- Genus: Gelanesaurus; Torres-Carvajal, Lobos, Venegas, Chávez, Aguirre-Peñafiel, Zurita, & Echevarría, 2016

Genus of lizards

Gelanesaurus is a genus of lizards in the family Gymnophthalmidae. The genus contains two species, which are native to Colombia and Ecuador. Both species were included in the genus Potamites until 2016 when they were moved to the genus Gelanesaurus.

== Species ==
The genus Gelanesaurus contains two species which are recognized as being valid.

- Gelanesaurus cochranae (C. Burt & M. Burt, 1931) – Cochran's neusticurus
- Gelanesaurus flavogularis (Altamirano-Benavides, Zaher, Lobo, Grazziotin, Sales Nunes & Rodrigues, 2013)

Nota bene: A binomial authority in parentheses indicates that the species was originally described in a genus other than Gelanesaurus.
