= Colobosaura =

Scientific classification
- Kingdom: Animalia
- Phylum: Chordata
- Class: Reptilia
- Order: Squamata
- Family: Gymnophthalmidae
- Tribe: Iphisini
- Genus: Colobosaura; Boulenger, 1887

Genus of reptiles

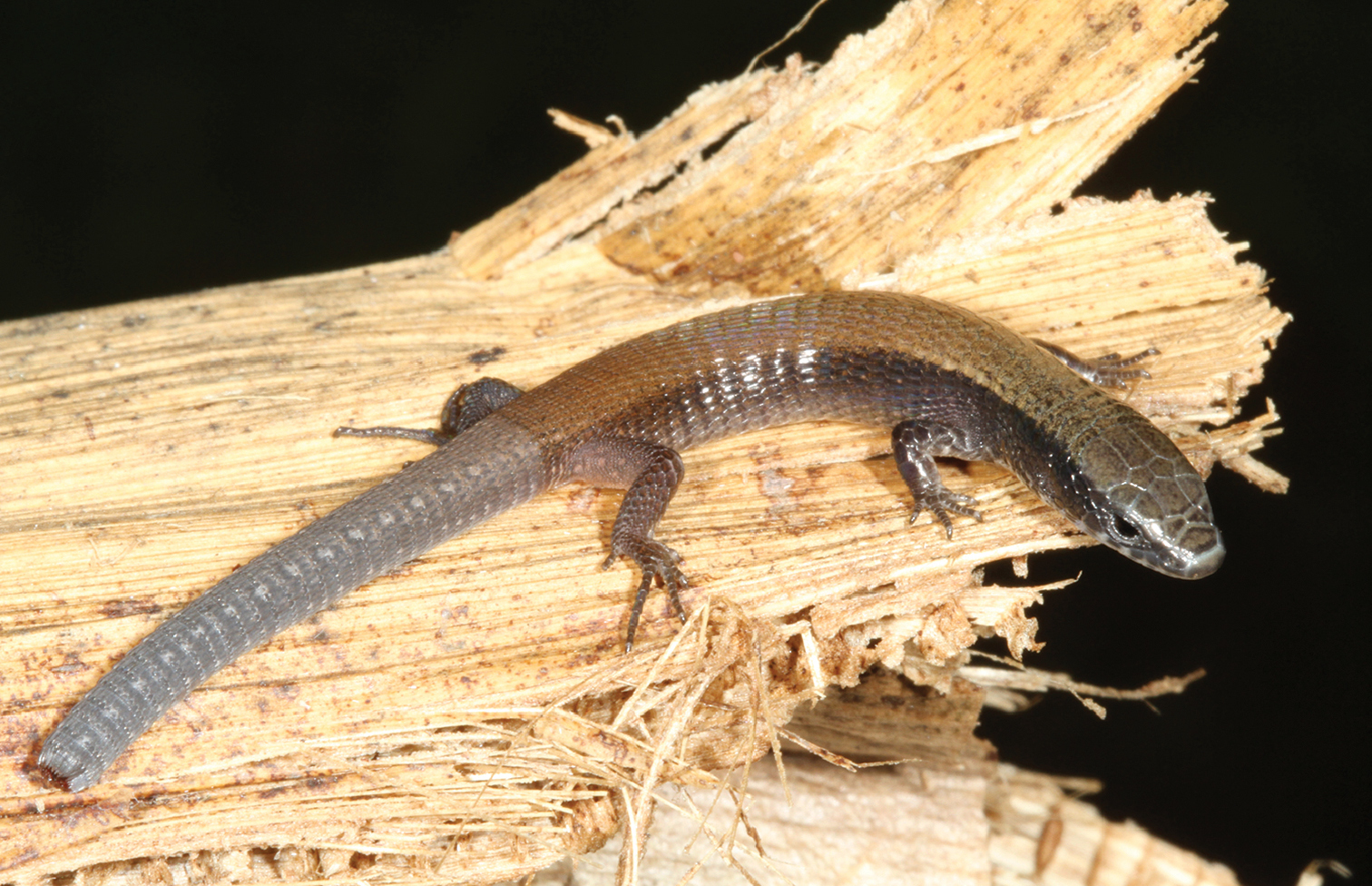
Colobosaura Kraepelini

Colobosaura is a genus of lizard, endemic to South America, in the family Gymnophthalmidae.

== Species ==
Two species are recognized as being valid.

- Colobosaura kraepelini (Werner, 1910) - Chaco colobosaura
- Colobosaura modesta (J.T. Reinhardt & Lütken, 1862) - Bahia colobosaura
