= Petracola =

Scientific classification
- Kingdom: Animalia
- Phylum: Chordata
- Class: Reptilia
- Order: Squamata
- Family: Gymnophthalmidae
- Genus: Petracola; Doan & Castoe, 2005

Genus of lizards

Petracola is a genus of lizards in the family Gymnophthalmidae. The genus is endemic to Peru.

== Species ==
The genus Petracola contains five species which are recognized as being valid.

- Petracola angustisoma Echevarría & Venegas, 2015
- Petracola labioocularis (Köhler & Lehr, 2004)
- Petracola pajatensis Rodríguez & Mamani, 2020
- Petracola ventrimaculatus (Boulenger, 1900) - spotted lightbulb lizard
- Petracola waka Kizirian, Bayefsky-Anand, Eriksson, Le, & Donnelly, 2008

Nota bene: A binomial authority in parentheses indicates that the species was originally described in a genus other than Petracola.
