= Selvasaura =

Scientific classification
- Kingdom: Animalia
- Phylum: Chordata
- Class: Reptilia
- Order: Squamata
- Family: Gymnophthalmidae
- Genus: Selvasaura; Moravec, Šmid, Štundl, & Lehr, 2018

Genus of lizards

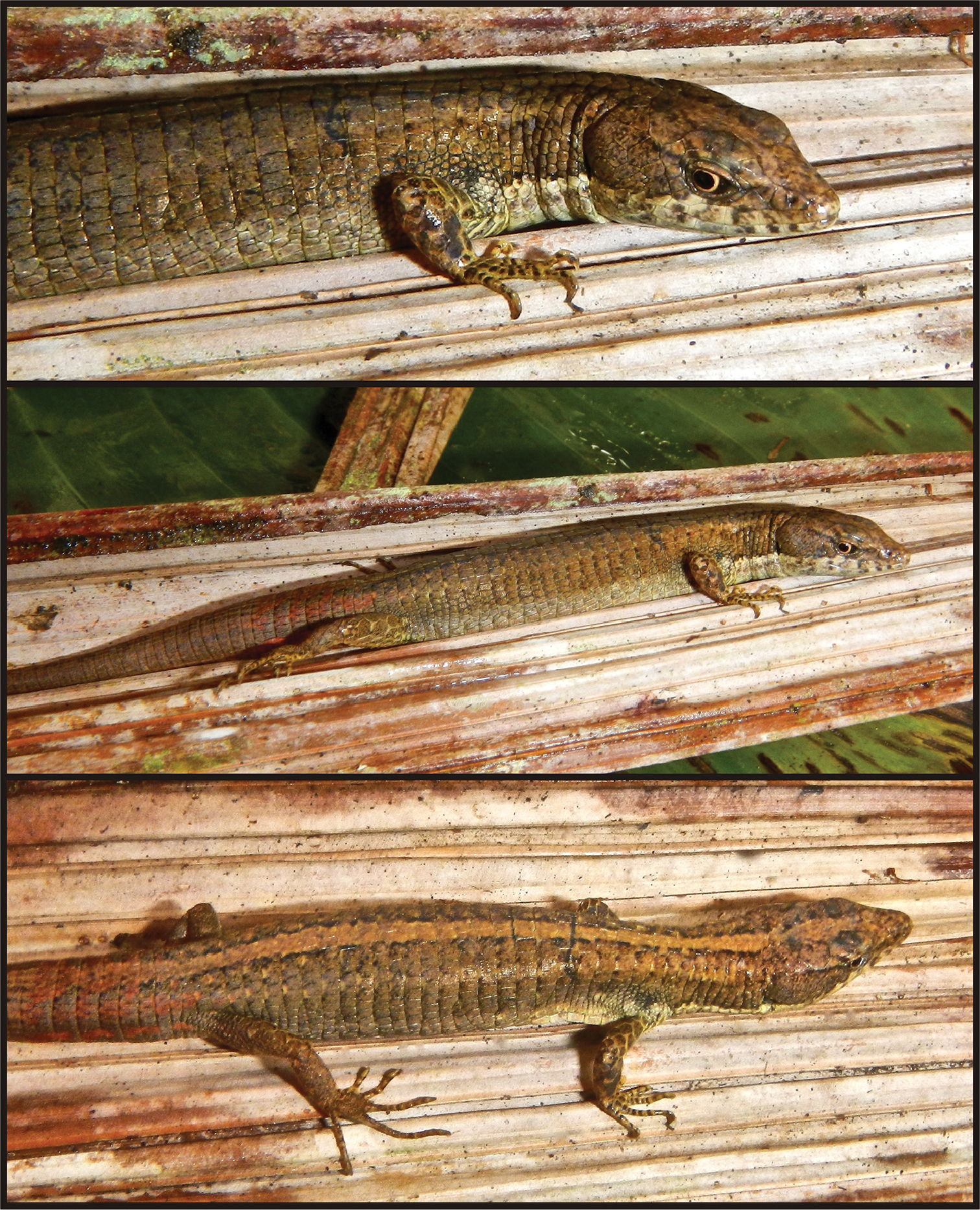
Selvasaura brava

Selvasaura is a genus of the lizard family Gymnophthalmidae. The genus contains three species.

== Species ==
- Selvasaura almendarizae Torres-Carvajal, Parra, Sales-Nunes, & Koch, 2021. - Almendáriz's microtegu
- Selvasaura brava Moravec, Šmíd, Štundl, & Lehr, 2018. - Brave forest microtegu
- Selvasaura candesi Chávez, García-Ayachi & Catenazzi, 2023. - CANDES microtegu.
- Selvasaura evasa Echevarría, Venegas, García-Ayachi, & Sales-Nunes, 2021. - Elusive microtegu.
- Selvasaura mamaduluae Brito-Zapata, Guayasamin, Parra, Torres-Carvajal & Reyes-Puig, 2023. - Cordillera del Cóndor's microtegu.
