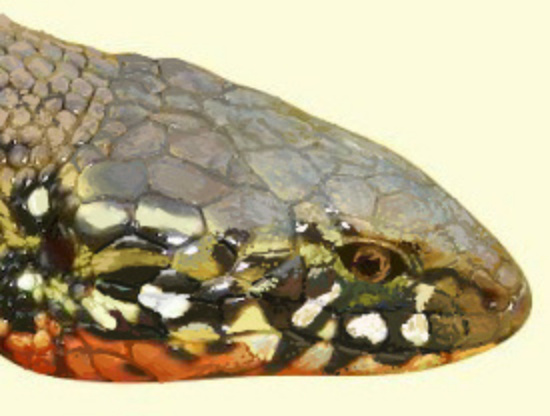

Conservation status
- Least Concern (IUCN 3.1)

Scientific classification
- Kingdom: Animalia
- Phylum: Chordata
- Class: Reptilia
- Order: Squamata
- Family: Gymnophthalmidae
- Genus: Wilsonosaura; Lehr, Moravec & von May, 2019
- Species: W. josyi

Binomial name
- Wilsonosaura josyi (G. Köhler, 2003)

Synonyms
- Euspondylus josyi G. Köhler, 2003; Wisonosaura josyi — Lehr, Moravec & von May, 2019

= Wilsonosaura =

Species of lizard

Wilsonosaura josyi is a species of lizard in the family Gymnophthalmidae. The species, which is endemic to Peru, is monotypic in the genus Wilsonosaura.

== Etymology ==
The specific name, josyi, is in honor of Franz-Josef "Josy" Hans.

== Geographic range ==
W. josyi is found in central Peru, in Department of Junín.

== Habitat ==
The holotype of W. josyi was collected at an altitude of 2,880 m (9,450 ft), but its preferred natural habitat was not recorded.

== Reproduction ==
W. josyi is oviparous.
