= Iphisa =

Conservation status
- Least Concern (IUCN 3.1)

Scientific classification
- Kingdom: Animalia
- Phylum: Chordata
- Class: Reptilia
- Order: Squamata
- Family: Gymnophthalmidae
- Genus: Iphisa; Gray, 1851
- Species: I. elegans

Binomial name
- Iphisa elegans Gray, 1851

Genus of lizards

Iphisa is a genus of the lizard family Gymnophthalmidae. The genus is monotypic, meaning that it has only one species, Iphisa elegans, and its common name is the glossy shade lizard. I. elegans is native to the Amazon and is typically found in regions of South America, centrally located in the Amazon Basin. The average body length of the glossy shade lizard is 55 mm. Relatively small, these lizards rely on running as their primary form of movement and, interestingly, exhibit death-feigning behavior, which aids in protection from potential predators.

== History ==
The name Iphisa elegans stems from the root "Iphis-," which is associated with many individuals from Greek mythology. Namely, from Ovid's Metamorphoses narrative poem, Iphis, the daughter of Telethusa and Ligdus, was raised as a man by her mother such that her true gender could be hidden from her father, who wanted a son to carry on their family's farming legacy. The goddess Isis transformed Iphis into a man, and Iphis ended up marrying Ianthe.

In 1851, Gray diagnosed Iphisadae as a family; however, as the Iphisadae spelling is not in prevailing usage, it has been corrected to Iphisadae. This was then shortened to "Iphisa," as is the monotypic genus of this species.

=== Genome ===
Iphisa is part of the Squamata order, which is the largest order of reptiles. The Iphisa genome is 18,622 base pairs long, it has 12 protein-coding genes, 2 rRNA proteins, and 22 tRNA proteins.

== Physical characteristics ==
The body of the glossy shade lizard is compressed dorsoventrally, giving the lizard its elongated shape. The average body length is 55 mm; however, the length of I. elegans can reach a maximum of 62 mm. Adult glossy shade lizards exhibit sexual dichromatism as they appear antique-brown to dark yellow on their dorsal surface. The abdomen of females is a creamy grey color and the abdomen of males is an orange color. The orange color is thought to be related to the hormonal cycles of breeding males, yet more studies need to be conducted to observe if this difference in coloration offers any anti-predation advantage. Sexual dichromatism is a term that accounts for the difference in the coloration between the two sexes, between the males and the females. This can have implications on dominance and reproduction within the species. There are two longitudinal rows of scales on the dorsal side of the lizard as well as two longitudinal rows of scales on the ventral side of the lizard. As the lateral scales are smaller than the dorsal and ventral scales, each lateral side of the lizard is composed of three to five longitudinal rows of scales, with ninety percent of glossy shade lizards having four longitudinal rows of lateral scales on each side.

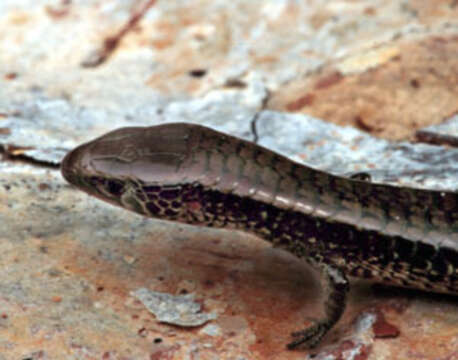
Scales of the glossy shade lizard.

I. elegans has a vestigial inner finger, which means that it poses no true function and just exists as part of the lizard's body. It also has claws, but these claws are not really visible. This can give the glossy shade lizard an advantage in protecting itself from predators since it can use its claws as weapons while the predator approaches, unsuspecting of any self-defense mechanism that I. elegans possesses. Moving more cranially, the glossy shade lizard has a lower eyelid with a transparent window, and the tympanic membrane (or ear drum) in its ear is exposed outwards. The tympanic membrane is a cavity that separates the inner ear from the outer ear. Auditory vibrations hit the tympanic membrane, which allow for sound to be heard and processed.

Although this species covers a large geographical range across the Amazon rainforest, Iphisa mostly has a broadly conserved external morphology. For this species, however, there is a lot of variation in the hemipenial morphotypes in males. This reinforces the fact that Iphisa is a cryptic species – there are high degrees of genetic and morphological differences across the lizards even though there are many instances of sympatry among the mtDNA lineages of these lizards.

== Habitat and distribution ==
Found in the Neotropics, I. elegans originates in South America. For a long time, Iphisa has been known to inhabit the amazon basins of Peru, Ecuador, Bolivia, Columbia, Brazil, and Guiana Shield. Recent studies, however, have found evidence that the distribution of Iphisa is more extensive. Research has confirmed the presence of Iphisa in 10 additional locations in the North and Southwest of the state of Mato Grosso.

The population trend for the glossy shade lizard is currently stable, meaning that there is relatively the same number of I. elegans continuously as the population size is neither increasing nor decreasing. Being at a stable population state can be viewed positively since there are no harsh or immediate threats that threaten the status of the species or risk it going extinct.

The habitat in which I. elegans resides is a terrestrial one, meaning that they live on land. Terrestrial habitats can include forests, grasslands, deserts, shorelines, and wetlands. Animals that live in terrestrial habitats are influenced by the moisture in the area (i.e., the moisture that builds from rain or snow falling), the cold temperatures in the winter season, the frequency at which the land floods with water, and the nutrients present in the soil. The Neotropics specifically encompasses two lowland deserts, a high-altitude inland desert, and the coastal deserts of Atacama and Sechura, which, together, form a long arid continuum in South America. Nevertheless, in contrast to these drier habitats, the glossy shade lizard can find its home in tropical rainforests that are either completely undisturbed or moderately disturbed. They can also be found at the borders of flooded tropical rainforests or, for example, near a creek. An ecomorphological guild is a group of organisms that adapt to similar environments and ecological roles in nature, thereby causing them to share morphological traits. I. elegans is a part of the fossorial and/or ground dwelling only ecomorphological guild, implying that this species spends most of its time either underground or on the ground. Fossorial is a description that essentially illustrates the action of digging and burrowing.

A vital part of the glossy shade lizard's habitat consists of leaf litter, which is a combination of leaves, twigs, and fallen bark that compose healthy soil. When leaf litter is decomposed, healthy nutrients are absorbed into the soil, which aid in keeping the soil moist. Furthermore, leaf litter is beneficial in that it can also serve as hiding spots and/or protection from any predators. Given the relatively small size of I. elegans, it is able to hide and take shelter among leaf litter, making this part of the lizard's habitat very advantageous.

== Reproduction ==
I. elegans sexually reproduces, meaning that the sperm from the male parent fertilizes the egg of the female parent to form the offspring. The sperm and the egg are two gametes that come together and form the zygote. This zygote and later becomes a mature lizard. Glossy shade lizards are oviparous animals. This signifies that they are animals that lay eggs and that their offspring hatch from the eggs after coming out of the mother's body. This species of lizard produces around one litter in a year.

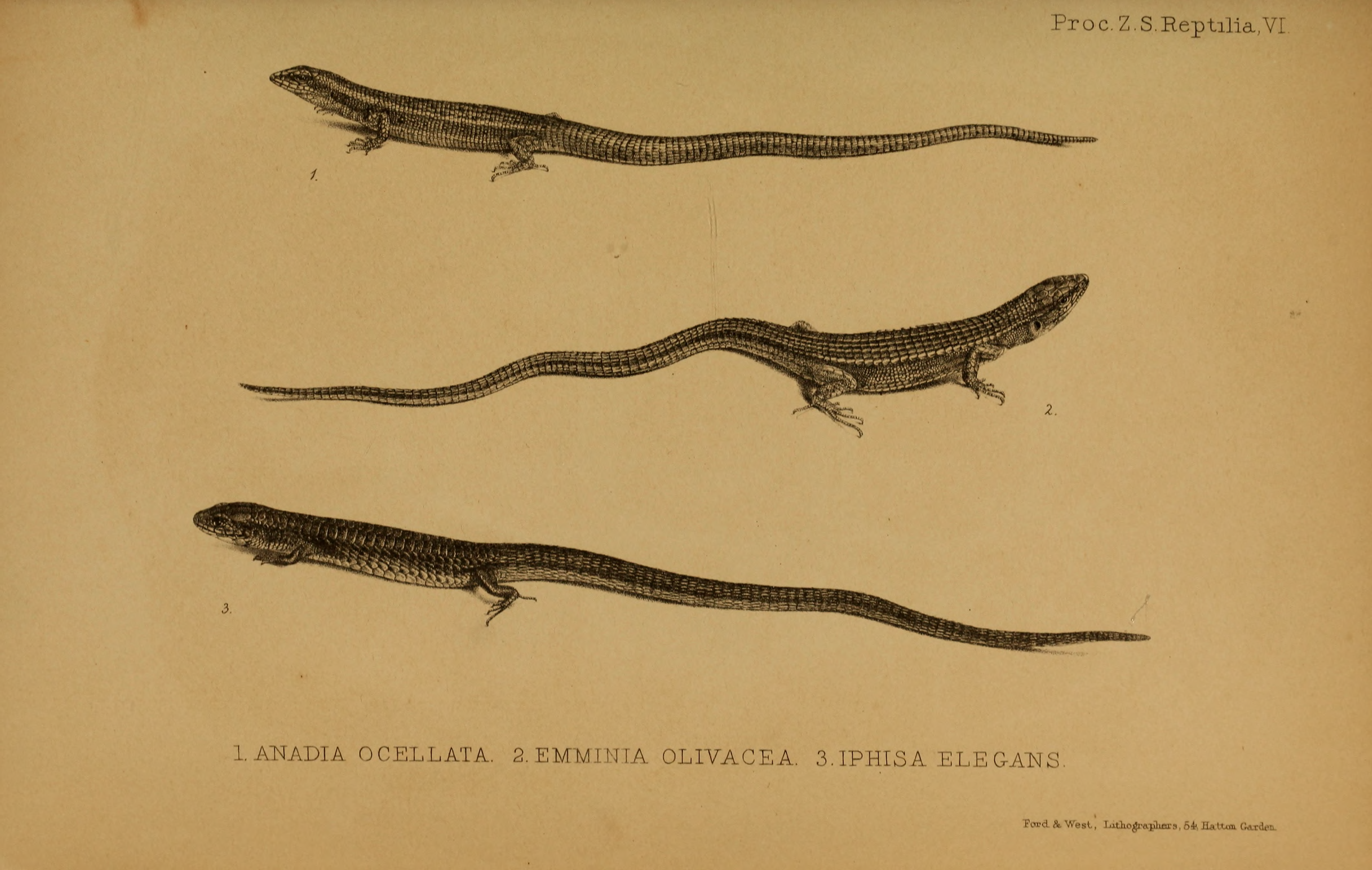
Drawing of Iphisa elegans in journal.

== Predator and prey ==
Predators of I. elegans include reptiles—particularly snakes and other lizards—as well as birds like hawks. The small size of the glossy shade lizard aids can have benefits for the predators as it makes it easier to grab and kill the prey.

I. elegans are diurnal carnivores. As carnivores, they eat meat and their diet chiefly consists of other animals. This is in contrast to the herbivore and omnivore diets, which consist more of leafy plants. Herbivores are animals that strictly only eat plants, and omnivores are animals who have a diet in between herbivores and carnivores as omnivores eat both plants and animals.

== Foraging ==
Iphisa is a species with diurnal habits. This means that these lizards tend to forage just below the top layer of leaves that cover the forest floor.

== Behavior ==
=== General ===
The behavior of the glossy shade lizard is quite unique, as it is rather difficult to observe the behavior and actions of this species of lizard. Its behavior is cryptic as the glossy shade lizard moves quickly on the ground. The cryptic behavior of this lizard species limits the amount of information there currently is regarding its behavior as it easily evades observation. However, another main behavior of I. elegans is its attempt to escape. Upon noticing any disturbance in their surrounding environment, I. elegans is able to quickly dart into leaf litter and seek hiding and protection there. Since these lizards are diurnal, they are primarily active during the daytime and more inactive in the nighttime. Additionally, the glossy shade lizard is an active forager, which is a term used to describe an individual that obtains food resources by actively searching for and obtaining them.

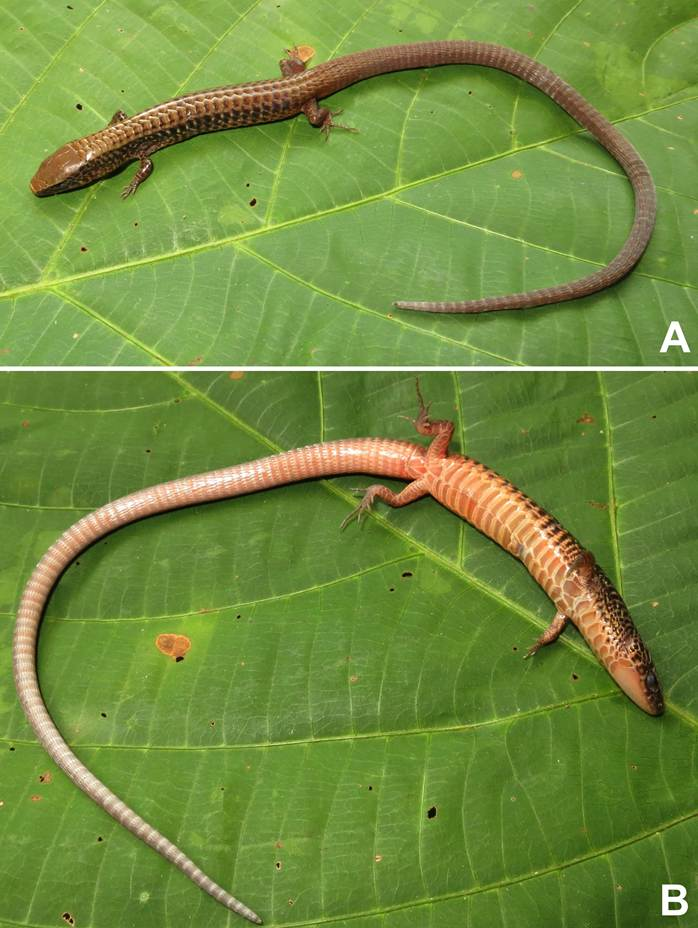
Death-feigning behavior of the male glossy shade lizard. (A) Lizard in normal posture. (B) Lizard in death-feigning posture. Note that the orange-colored abdomen is visible in the death-feigning posture.

=== Death-feigning ===
This is also known as thanatosis, and it is said that death-feigning behavior is only stimulated in the glossy shade lizard when its cryptic behavior or its escape attempt fails. Many animals engage in a death-feigning posture when they are under threat. This is often done to avoid predation from carnivores who eat live animals. If an animal appears dead, the animal is less likely to be eaten or attacked by a predator. Especially as hawks are a common predator of the glossy shade lizard, when hawks are flying above in the sky, if an animal appears dead below, they will not waste their energy to swoop down, land, and then eat the dead animal. This does not satisfy the cost-benefit analysis for the hawk, as it is more costly to expend wasteful energy as there is no benefit of prey since the animal is already "dead." Thus, the death-feigning behavior, which I. elegans exhibits, is a successful form of protection from predators. This posture, as seen in the image on the right, is held by the lizard turning their venter, or abdomen, up. The image on the right depicts the death-feigning posture of a male glossy shade lizard because the abdomen is orange in color. It is also found that I. elegans do not relax from this death-feigning posture until they are sure that the dangerous threat has been cleared and that they are once again safe. In the 2015 Machado-Filho et al. study, the glossy tailed lizard assumed the death-feigning posture as it was lifted up off of the ground and only returned back to its normal posture once it was placed safely back onto the ground.
