= Heterodactylus =

Scientific classification
- Kingdom: Animalia
- Phylum: Chordata
- Class: Reptilia
- Order: Squamata
- Family: Gymnophthalmidae
- Subfamily: Gymnophthalminae
- Tribe: Heterodactylini
- Genus: Heterodactylus; Spix, 1825

Genus of amphibians

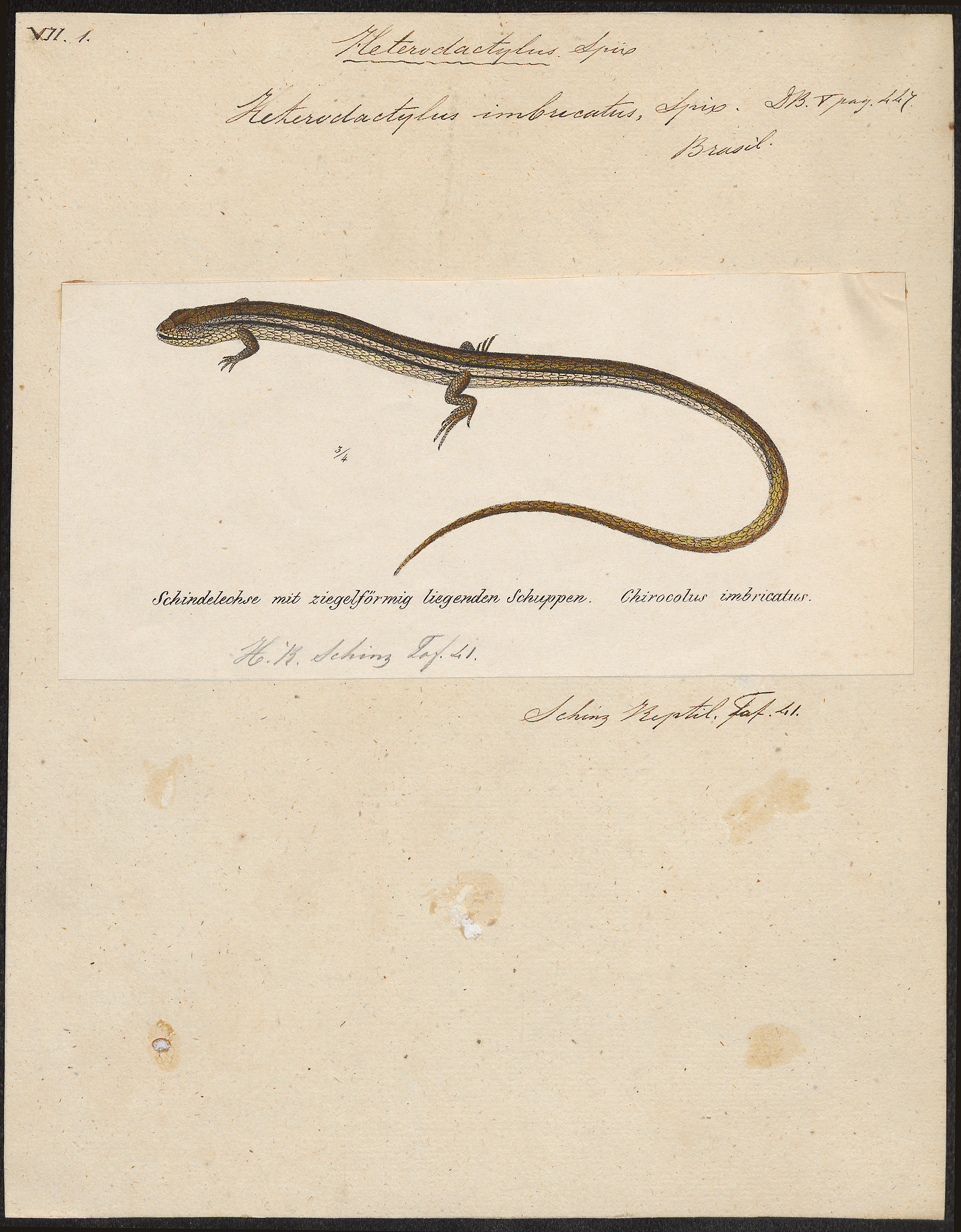
Illustration of Heterodactylus imbricatus (c. 1700-1880)

Heterodactylus is a genus of lizards in the family Gymnophthalmidae. The genus is endemic to Brazil.

== Species ==
The genus Heterodactylus contains the following three species which are recognized as being valid.

- Heterodactylus imbricatus Spix, 1825 - Rio de Janeiro teiid
- Heterodactylus lundii J.T. Reinhardt & Lütken, 1862 - Lund's teiid
- Heterodactylus septentrionalis Rodrigues, De Freitas & Silva, 2009
