= Dendrosauridion =

Scientific classification
- Kingdom: Animalia
- Phylum: Chordata
- Class: Reptilia
- Order: Squamata
- Family: Gymnophthalmidae
- Genus: Dendrosauridion; Lehr, Moravec, Lundberg, Köhler, Catenazzi, & Šmíd, 2019
- Species: D. yanesha

Binomial name
- Dendrosauridion yanesha Lehr, Moravec, Lundberg, Köhler, Catenazzi, & Šmíd, 2019

Genus of lizards

Dendrosauridion, the Yanesha tree microtegu, is a genus of the lizard family Gymnophthalmidae. The genus is monotypic, i.e. it has only one species, Dendrosauridion yanesha. It occurs in Peru.
