= Pantepuisaurus =

Conservation status
- Least Concern (IUCN 3.1)

Scientific classification
- Kingdom: Animalia
- Phylum: Chordata
- Class: Reptilia
- Order: Squamata
- Family: Gymnophthalmidae
- Genus: Pantepuisaurus; Kok, 2009
- Species: P. rodriguesi

Binomial name
- Pantepuisaurus rodriguesi Kok, 2009

Genus of lizards

Pantepuisaurus is a genus of lizard in the family Gymnophthalmidae. The genus is monotypic, containing only one species, Pantepuisaurus rodriguesi. The species is endemic to Guyana.

== Etymology ==
The specific name, rodriguesi, is in honor of Brazilian herpetologist Miguel Trefaut Rodrigues.

== Geographic range ==
P. rodriguesi occurs in western Guyana.

== Habitat ==
The preferred habitats of P. rodriguesi are forest, grassland, and freshwater wetland, at an altitude of 2,080 m (6,820 ft).
