= Miguel Trefaut Rodrigues =

Brazilian herpetologist and professor

Miguel Trefaut Urbano Rodrigues
- Born: 1953 (age 72–73); Brazil
- Education: University of São Paulo
- Known for: Research on Brazilian frogs and reptiles
- Scientific career
- Fields: Herpetology
- Workplaces: University of São Paulo
- Author abbrev. (zoology): Rodrigues

Miguel Trefaut Urbano Rodrigues (born 1953) is a Brazilian herpetologist.

After graduating from the He graduated from the Paris Diderot University (formerly Université Paris VII) he received his Ph.D. from the University of São Paulo in 1984. In 1996, he became a professor of biology at the same university and served as director of the Zoological Museum of the University of São Paulo from 1997 to 2001. His research has focused on Brazilian frogs and reptiles.

He has described 53 species of reptiles and amphibians. Several species of reptiles, amphibians, and a fish have been named in his honor, including the frog Cycloramphus migueli (Heyer, 1988).

== Taxa named in his honor ==
- Burlemarxia rodriguesii Menezes & Semir, 1991 (Monocotyledoneae, Velloziaceae)
- Cycloramphus migueli Heyer, 1988 (Anura, Cycloramphidae)
- Glaphyropoma rodriguesi de Pinna, 1992 (Siluriformes, Trichomycteridae)
- Liotyphlops trefauti Freire, Caramaschi & Argolo, 2007 (Squamata, Anomalepididae)
- Pantepuisaurus rodriguesi Kok, 2009 (Squamata, Gymnophthalmidae)
- Trichomycterus trefauti Wosiacki, 2004 (Siluriformes, Trichomycteridae)
