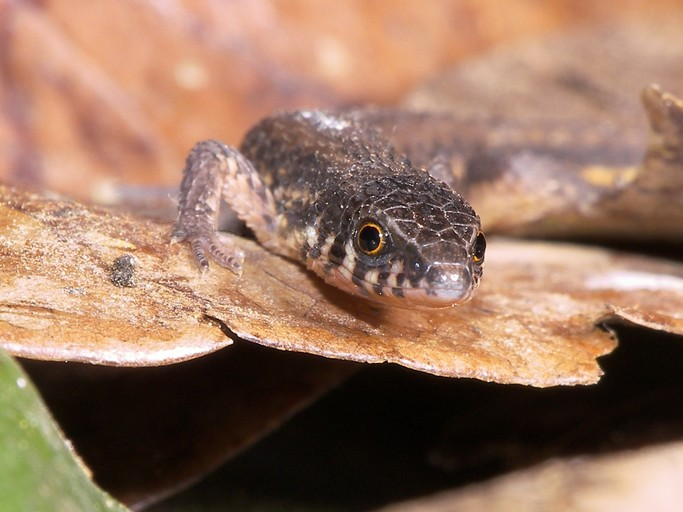
- Loxopholis rugiceps

Scientific classification
- Kingdom: Animalia
- Phylum: Chordata
- Class: Reptilia
- Order: Squamata
- Superfamily: Gymnophthalmoidea
- Family: Gymnophthalmidae; Fitzinger, 1826

Diversity
- 265 species in 56 genera

= Gymnophthalmidae =

Spectacled lizards

Family of lizards

Gymnophthalmidae is a family of lizards with at least 250 species, sometimes known commonly as spectacled lizards or microteiids. They are called "spectacled" because of their transparent lower eyelids, which allow them to still see with closed eyes. As in most lizards, except geckos, these eyelids are movable. The Alopoglossidae have been recently moved from this family.

== Description and ecology ==
Spectacled lizards are related to the Teiidae, but they look like skinks (slightly more distant relatives) with smooth scales. They are generally small lizards; many species have reduced limbs. Unusually among lizards, however, it is generally the hind limbs that are reduced or absent, rather than the forelimbs.

Gymnophthalmids live in a wide variety of habitats, from desert to mountain to rain forest, throughout Central America and South America. They are usually inhabitants of the forest floor or wet areas associated with tropical forests, either nocturnal or intermittently active throughout the day. Spectacled lizards eat mostly insects and other invertebrates, and all species lay eggs. Often they can be found under logs, rocks, or other debris or foraging for small invertebrate prey. Some species are able to dive to escape.

== Genera ==
- Acratosaura (2 species)
- Adercosaurus (monotypic)
- Alexandresaurus (monotypic)
- Amapasaurus (monotypic)
- Anadia (20 species)
- Andinosaura (11 species)
- Anotosaura (2 species)
- Arthrosaura (7 species)
- Bachia (31 species)
- Calyptommatus (5 species)
- Caparaonia (monotypic)
- Centrosaura (monotypic)
- Cercosaura (18 species)
- Colobodactylus (2 species)
- Colobosaura (2 species)
- Colobosauroides (2 species)
- Dendrosauridion (monotypic)
- Dryadosaura (monotypic)
- Echinosaura (8 species)
- Ecpleopus (monotypic)
- Euspondylus (10 species)
- Gelanesaurus (2 species)
- Gymnophthalmus (8 species)
- Heterodactylus (3 species)
- Iphisa (monotypic)
- Kaieteurosaurus (monotypic)
- Kataphraktosaurus (monotypic)
- Leposoma (6 species)
- Loxopholis (11 species)
- Macropholidus (4 species)
- Magdalenasaura (2 species)
- Marinussaurus (monotypic)
- Micrablepharus (2 species)
- Neusticurus (7 species)
- Nothobachia (monotypic)
- Oreosaurus (7 species)
- Pantepuisaurus (monotypic)
- Petracola (5 species)
- Pholidobolus (13 species)
- Placosoma (4 species)
- Potamites (7 species)
- Procellosaurinus (2 species)
- Proctoporus (21 species)
- Psilops (3 species)
- Rhachisaurus (monotypic)
- Rheosaurus (monotypic)
- Riama (15 species)
- Riolama (6 species)
- Rondonops (2 species)
- Scriptosaura (monotypic)
- Selvasaura (3 species)
- Stenolepis (monotypic)
- Tretioscincus (3 species)
- Vanzosaura (3 species)
- Wilsonosaura (monotypic)
- Yanomamia (2 species)

== Bibliography ==
- Bauer, Aaron M. (1998). "[Gymnophthalmidae]". p. 171. In: Cogger, Harold G.; Zweifel, Richard G. (editors) (1998). Encyclopedia of Reptiles and Amphibians. San Diego: Academic Press. 240 pp. ISBN 0-12-178560-2.
- Goin, Coleman J.; Goin, Olive B.; Zug, George R. (1978). Introduction to Herpetology, Third Edition. San Francisco: W.H. Freeman and Company:xi + 378 pp. ISBN 0-7167-0020-4. ("Subfamily Gymnophthalminae", p. 305).
