= List of flora and fauna of the Eastern Hills, Bogotá =

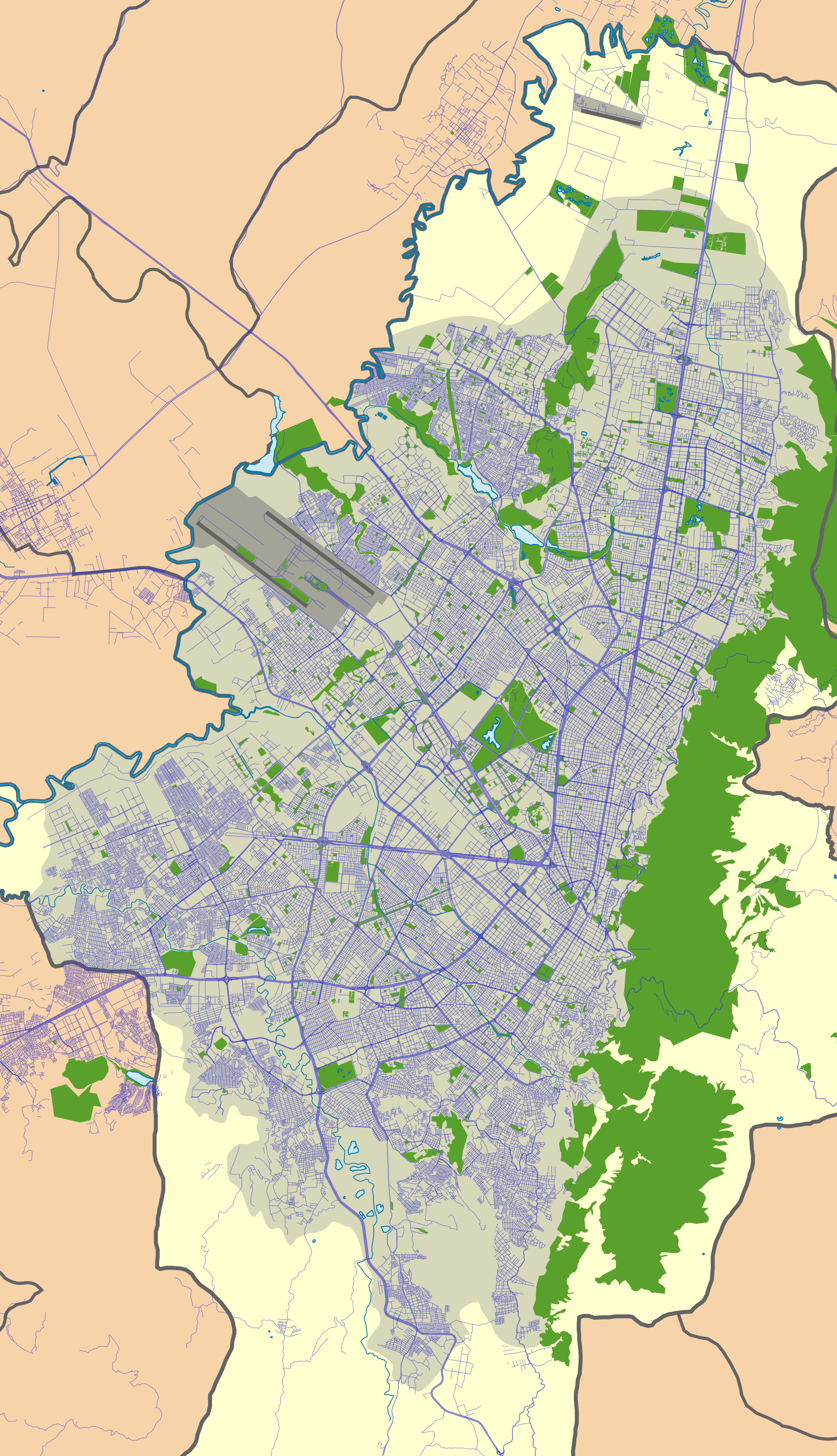
Eastern Hills, Bogotá

The Eastern Hills of Bogotá is a threatened but rich area of biodiversity. Various species have been registered in the Eastern Hills of the Colombian capital.

== Flora ==
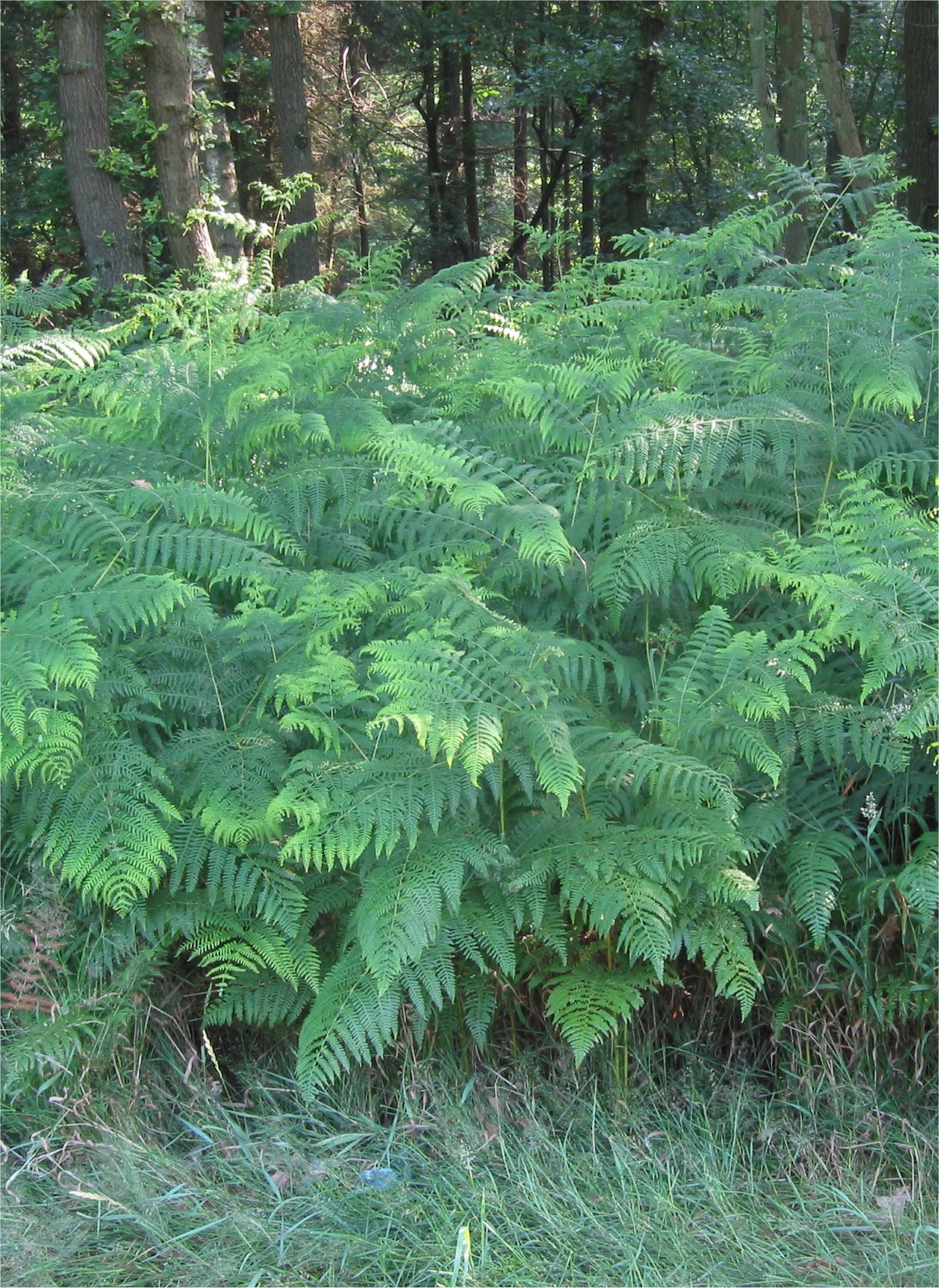
Eagle fern (Pteridium aquilinum)

In the Eastern Hills a total of 443 species of flora have been identified, of which 156 species in 111 genera and 64 families of vascular plants.

Family	Genera	Species
Orchideae	33	118
Bromeliaceae	10	47
Asteraceae	9	38
Ericaceae	8	19
Melastomaceae	9	18
Rosaceae	6	15
Rubiaceae	6	11

A study published in 2013 lists as most important and characteristic species:

Name	Species	Image
eagle fern	Pteridium aquilinum	
encenillo	Weinmannia tomentosa	
	Drimys granadensis	
	Axinaea macrophylla	
	Bejaria resinosa	
	Carex jamesonii	
	Cavendishia bracteata	
	Chaetogastra grossa, syn. Tibouchina grossa	
	Chusquea scandens	
	Clusia multiflora	
	Disterigma alaternoides	
	Gaiadendron punctatum	
	Holodiscus argenteus	
	Lycopodium thyoides	
	Macleania rupestris	
	Munnozia senecionidis	
	Myrcianthes rhopaloides	
	Myrsine coriaceae	
	Myrsine guianensis	
	Odontoglossum lindenii	
	Oreopanax floribundum	
	Tillandsia pastensis	
	Tillandsia turneri	
	Ugni myricoides	
	Asplenium serra	
	Begonia urticae	
	Clethra fimbriata	
	Diplostephium rosmarinifolium	
	Elaphoglossum minutum	
	Geissanthus andinus	
	Hedyosmun parvifolium	
	Hypnum amabile	
	Macrocarpaea glabra	
	Miconia squamulosa	
	Monochaetum myrtoideum	
	Morella parvifolia	
	Ocotea sericea	
	Oreopanax bogotensis	
	Oreopanax mutisianus	
	Pentacalia vaccinioides	
	Peperomia rotundata	
	Persea mutissi	
	Piper bogotense	
	Pleurothallis grandiflora	
	Psychotria boqueronensis	
	Rhamnus goudotiana	
	Solanum oblongifolium	
	Weinmannia rollottii	

== Birds ==
Colombia is the country with the most recorded bird species (1912 as of 2014) in the world. The biodiversity of bird species in the Eastern Hills is higher than in the parks of urban Bogotá. The northern part of the reserve is richer in bird species due to the dense forests and larger space between the urban zones. Birds of 30 families, 92 genera and 119 species have been identified in the Eastern Hills. A study in 2011 provided data on 67 species in an area of 75 hectares (190 acres). The observation stations were between 2,674 metres (8,773 ft) and 3,065 metres (10,056 ft) in elevation.

Common name	Species	Image
white-bellied woodstar	Acestrura mulsant	
yellow-billed cacique	Amblycercus holosericeus	
red-crested cotinga	Ampelion rubrocristatus	
scarlet-bellied mountain tanager	Anisognathus igniventris	
white-browed brush finch	Arremon torquatus	
pale-naped brush finch	Atlapetes pallidinucha	
slaty brush finch	Atlapetes schistaceus	
russet-crowned warbler	Basileuterus coronatus	
black-crested warbler	Basileuterus nigrocristatus	
broad-winged hawk	Buteo platypterus	
band-winged nightjar	Caprimulgus longirostris	
band-tailed seedeater	Catamenia analis	
plain-colored seedeater	Catamenia inornata	
Swainson's thrush	Catharus ustulatus	
rufous wren	Cinnycerthia unirufa	
yellow-billed cuckoo	Coccyzus americanus	
golden-bellied starfrontlet	Coeligena bonapartei	
crested bobwhite	Colinus cristatus	
rufous-browed conebill	Conirostrum rufum	
black vulture	Coragyps atratus	
Blackburnian warbler	Dendroica fusca	
white-sided flowerpiercer	Diglossa albilatera	
bluish flowerpiercer	Diglossa caerulescens	
grey-bellied flowerpiercer	Diglossa carbonaria	
masked flowerpiercer	Diglossa cyanea	
black flowerpiercer	Diglossa humeralis	
mountain elaenia	Elaenia frantzii	
white-tailed kite	Elanus leucurus	
glowing puffleg	Eriocnemis vestita	
American kestrel	Falco sparverius	
Andean pygmy owl	Glaucidium jardinii	
chestnut-crowned antpitta	Grallaria ruficapilla	
black-eared hemispingus	Hemispingus melanotis	
superciliaried hemispingus	Hemispingus superciliaris	
grey-breasted wood wren	Henicorhina leucophrys	
barn swallow	Hirundo rustica	
golden-crowned tanager	Iridosornis rufivertex	
green-tailed trainbearer	Lesbia nuna	
white-throated tyrannulet	Mecocerculus leucophrys	
Tyrian metaltail	Metallura thyrianthina	
golden-fronted whitestart	Myioborus ornatus	
streak-throated bush tyrant	Myiotheretes striaticollis	
brown-bellied swallow	Notiochelidon murina	
band-tailed pigeon	Patagioenas fasciata	
Andean guan	Penelope montagnii	
plumbeous sierra finch	Phrygilus unicolor	
smoky-brown woodpecker	Picoides fumigatus	
fawn-breasted tanager	Pipraeidea melanonota	
purple-backed thornbill	Ramphomicron microrhynchum	
eastern meadowlark	Sturnella magna	
house wren	Troglodytes aedon	
great thrush	Turdus fuscater	
eastern kingbird	Tyrannus tyrannus	
eared dove	Zenaida auriculata	
rufous-collared sparrow	Zonotrichia capensis	
black-chested mountain tanager	Buthraupis eximia	
blue-throated starfrontlet	Coeligena helianthea	
brown-backed chat-tyrant	Ochthoeca fumicolor	
buff-breasted mountain tanager	Dubusia taeniata	
cinnamon flycatcher	Pyrrhomyias cinnamomeus	
coppery-bellied puffleg	Eriocnemis cupreoventris	
many-striped canastero	Asthenes flammulata	
sparkling violetear	Colibri coruscans	
yellow-backed oriole	Icterus chrysater	
pale-bellied tapaculo	Scytalopus griseicollis	
rufous-banded owl	Ciccaba albitarsis	
silvery-throated spinetail	Synallaxis subpudica	
tawny-rumped tyrannulet	Phyllomyias uropygialis	
white-throated screech owl	Megascops albogularis	

== Mammals ==
Mammals of 14 families, 17 genera and 18 species have been identified in the Eastern Hills. Until the first half of the twentieth century, the Eastern Hills were populated by larger species as the puma, spectacled bear and white-tailed deer, but these species have been hunted to extinction.

Common name	Species	Image
crab-eating fox	Cerdocyon thous	
mountain paca	Cuniculus taczanowskii	
white-eared opossum	Didelphis albiventris	
eastern red bat	Lasiurus borealis	
oncilla	Leopardus tigrinus	
long-tailed weasel	Mustela frenata	
western dwarf coati	Nasuella olivacea	
red-tailed squirrel	Sciurus granatensis	
tapeti	Sylvilagus brasiliensis	
soft-furred Oldfield mouse	Thomasomys laniger	
snow-footed Oldfield mouse	Thomasomys niveipes	
Thomas' small-eared shrew	Cryptotis thomasi	
	Cavia anolaimae	

== Reptiles ==
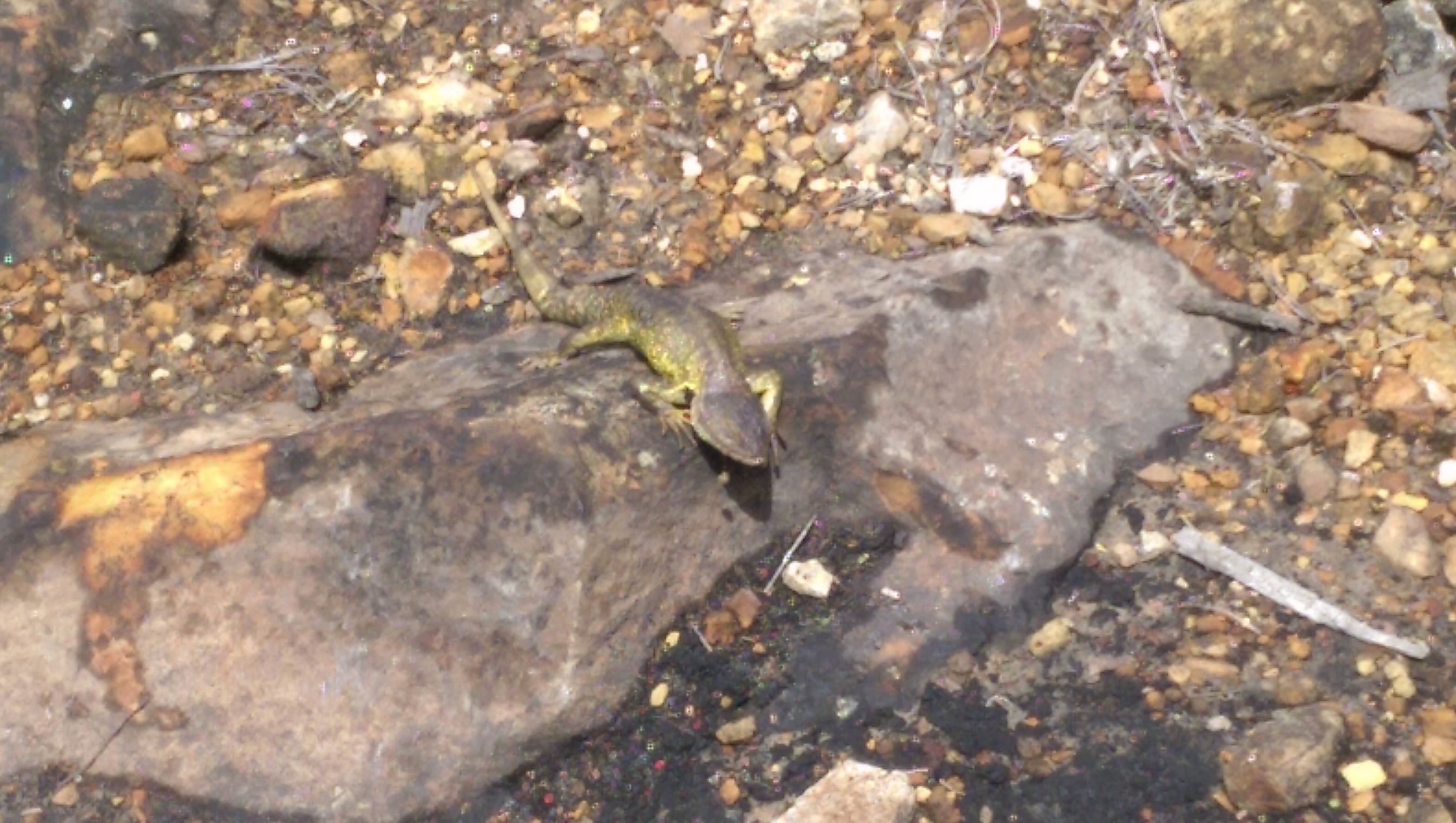
Unidentified lizard in the Eastern Hills, locality Chapinero

Reptiles of four families, five genera and five species have been identified in the Eastern Hills. Of these species, only the lizards Anadia bogotensis and Proctoporus striatus have been found on the Guadalupe Hill. The striped lightbulb lizard is also present on the terrain of the Universidad de los Andes.

Common name	Species	Image
flat Andes anole	Phenacosaurus heterodermus	
striped lightbulb lizard	Proctoporus striatus	
Duméril's whorltail iguana	Stenocercus trachycephalus	
thickhead ground snake	Atractus crassicaudatus	
	Anadia bogotensis	

== Amphibians ==
Amphibians of four families, six genera and nine species have been identified in the Eastern Hills.

Common name	Species	Image
Peter's climbing salamander	Bolitoglossa adspersa	
	Centrolene buckleyi	
cream-backed poison frog	Colostethus subpunctatus	
Bogota robber frog	Eleutherodactylus bogotensis	
elegant robber frog	Eleutherodactylus elegans	
green dotted treefrog	Hyla labialis	
Bogota treefrog	Hyla bogotensis	
Edwards' rocket frog	Colostethus edwardsi	

== Fish ==
Three species of fish have been identified in the waters of the Eastern Hills. Of Trichomycterus venulosus only two specimens have been found, and it is thought the species is extinct in the rivers of the Eastern Hills, which may have to do with the introduction of trout.

Common name	Species	Image
rainbow trout (introduced)	Oncorhynchus mykiss	
	Trichomycterus venulosus (extinct?)	
	Trichomycterus bogotense	

== Butterflies ==
In the Eastern Hills two species of butterflies have been identified.

Common name	Species	Image
Julia butterfly	Dryas iulia	
common green-eyed white	Leptophobia aripa aripa	

== See also ==
- List of flora and fauna named after the Muisca
- Biodiversity of Colombia
- Thomas van der Hammen Natural Reserve
