= Lake Herrera =

Small lake near Mosquera and Bogotá, Colombia

- Location within Colombia
- Location: Mosquera, Cundinamarca
- Coordinates: 4°41′26″N 74°16′29″W
- Type: Wetland; Artificial lake (since 1973)
- Part of: Bogotá savanna
- Primary inflows: Bojacá River; Bogotá River (San José channel)
- Primary outflows: none
- Basin countries: Colombia
- Max. length: 3 kilometres (1.9 mi)
- Max. width: 1.5 kilometres (0.93 mi)
- Surface area: 280 hectares (690 acres)
- Average depth: 1.3 metres (4.3 ft)
- Max. depth: 2 metres (6.6 ft)
- Surface elevation: 2,550 m (8,370 ft)

Lake Herrera is a small lake located at 5 kilometres (3.1 mi) from the urban centre of Mosquera and about 20 kilometres (12 mi) west of the capital Bogotá in Cundinamarca, Colombia. The Andean lake has made its name in the Herrera Period, the period in the history of central Colombia before the Muisca Period, after archaeologist Sylvia Broadbent excavated ceramics around Lake Herrera in 1971.

== Description ==
Lake Herrera and other preceramic sites on the Bogotá savanna

Lake Herrera is situated on the Bogotá savanna; the southwestern part of the Andean high plateau in the Eastern Ranges; the Altiplano Cundiboyacense. The lake is one of many remainders of the Pleistocene Lake Humboldt. It is the largest remaining natural water reserve on the Bogotá savanna and the reserve belongs to the municipalities Mosquera, Madrid and Bojacá.

=== History ===
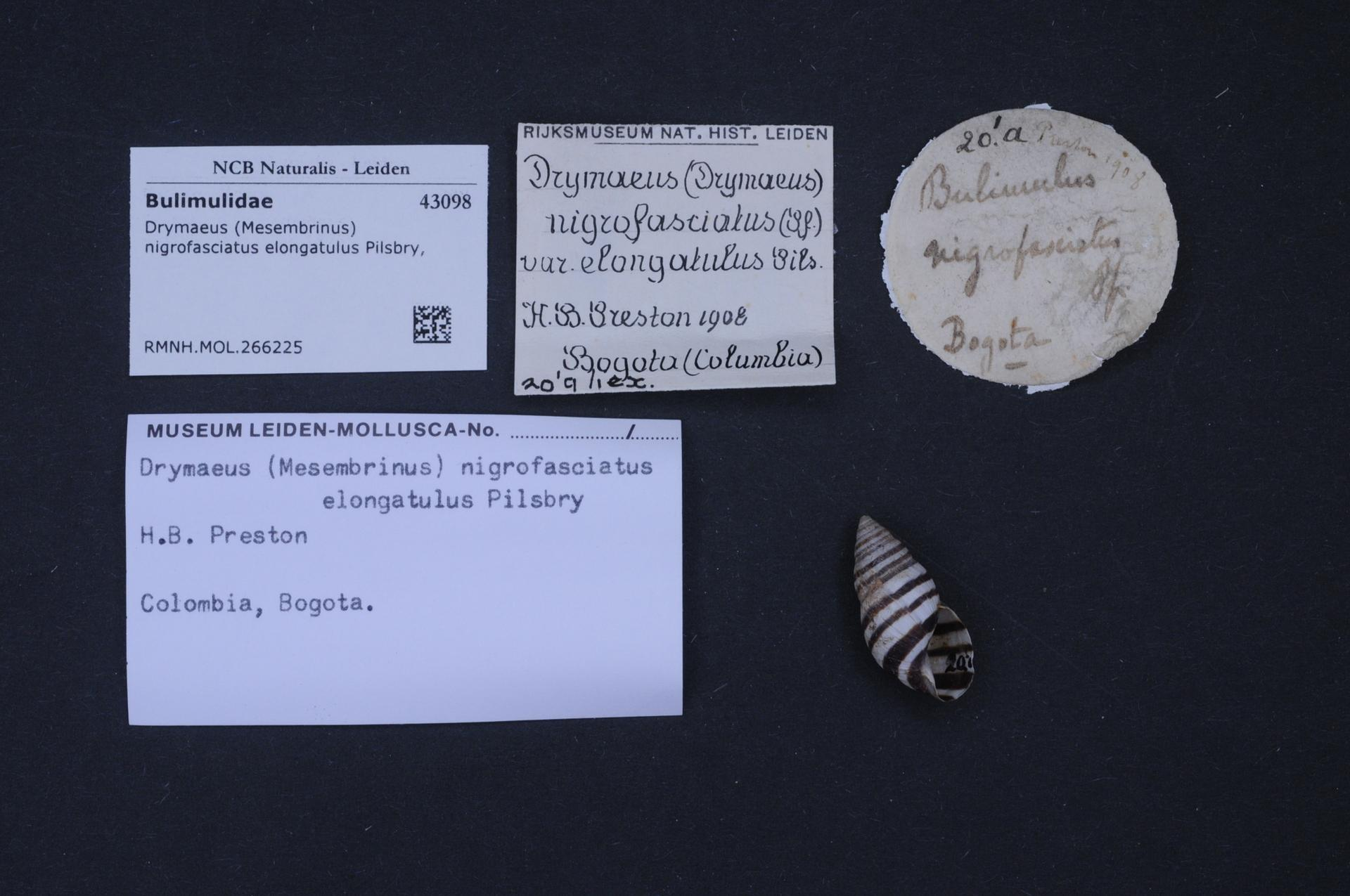
Drymaeus nigrofasciatus, land snail from around Lake Herrera

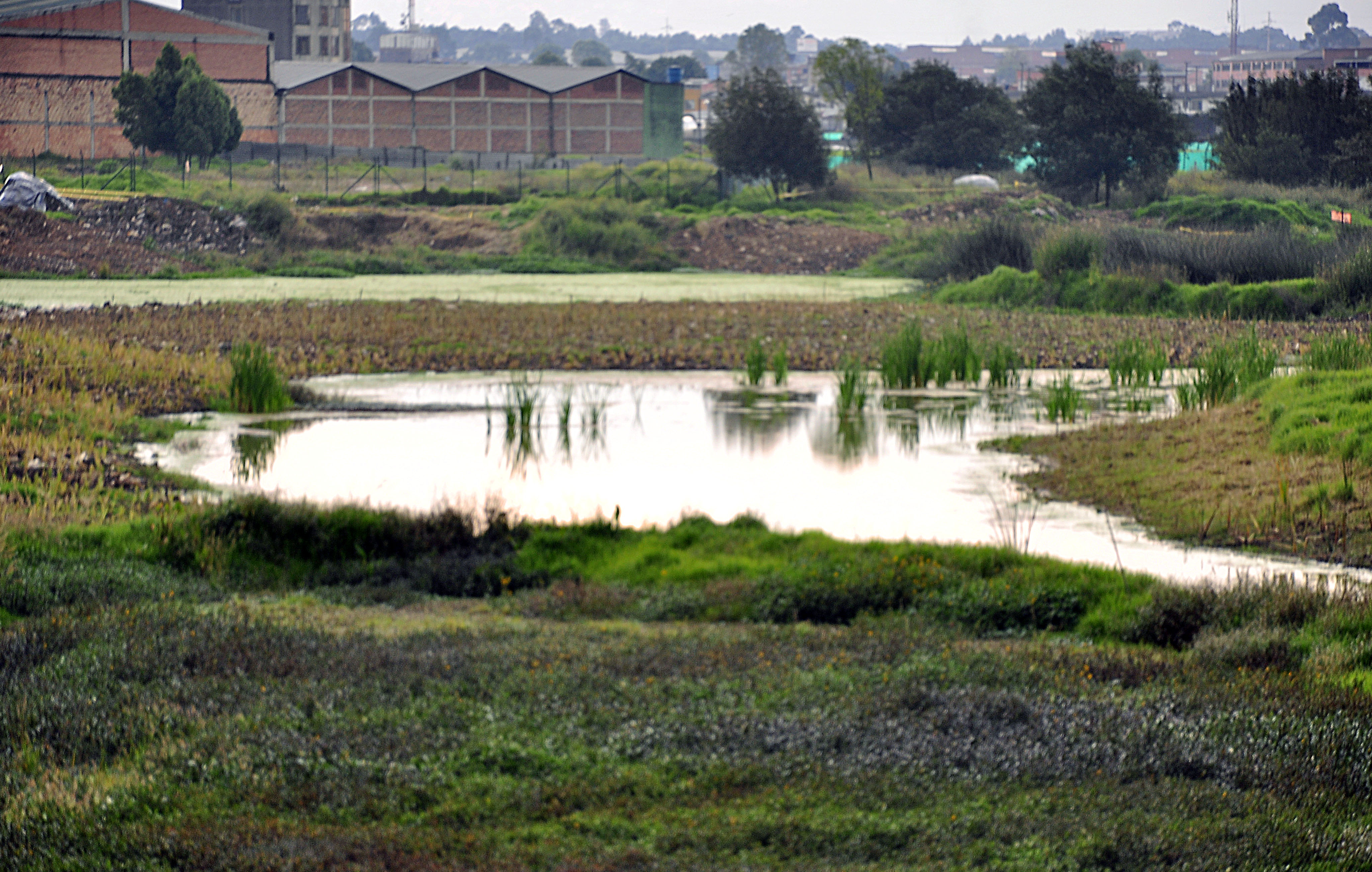
El Burro, similar wetland to Lake Herrera

Investigations by archaeologist Gonzalo Correal Urrego in 1984 have revealed the existence of a preceramic site with two layers. The oldest layer has been dated at 3410 years BP and the younger layer at 3135 BP.

Correal Urrego has discovered preceramic tools and wooden beams in horizontal position, possibly used to against the lake overflowing. Different stone tools found are scrapers and chips with sharp edges. Other tools were handles, and white-tailed deer bone tools for perforation, scraping and cutting. Evidence of fireplaces and burial grounds has been uncovered. One of the burial sites contained a full skeleton surrounded by five skulls. Remains of fauna collected by the hunter-gatherers were mammals, birds and snails. The presence of basalt, not formed on the Altiplano, indicated movement from the Magdalena Valley.

When the climatic conditions became drier and layers of volcanic ash were deposited around the lake in the first millennium BCE, the inhabitants of the region started to develop agriculture around the lake.

Later excavations have provided ceramic with a typical red colour, rich in SiO_{2}.

The lake is a residual part of Lake Humboldt, but since 1973 functions as an artificial lake after the construction of drainage channels. The lake is fed from the Bojacá River from the northeast and from the San José channel, fed by the Bogotá River in the southwest. Between 1969 and 2013 the surface area of the lake has been reduced with 175 hectares (430 acres).

Recent mining activities close to the lake endanger the environment of Lake Herrera, formalised a water reserve on July 23, 2006.

=== Biodiversity ===
Flora and fauna around the lake is endangered and migrating birds use Lake Herrera. Several species have been found and described in and around the lake:

- thickhead ground snake (Atractus crassicaudatus)
- Cheilanthes myriophylla
- Drymaeus nigrofasciatus
- Stenocercus trachycephalus

=== Tourism ===
The lake can be visited and walked around, although some parts are privately owned and access permits have to be arranged.

== Trivia ==
- Another name for Lake Herrera and its surroundings is Sabrisky Desert

== See also ==
- Bogotá savanna, wetlands of Bogotá
- Herrera Period, El Infiernito
