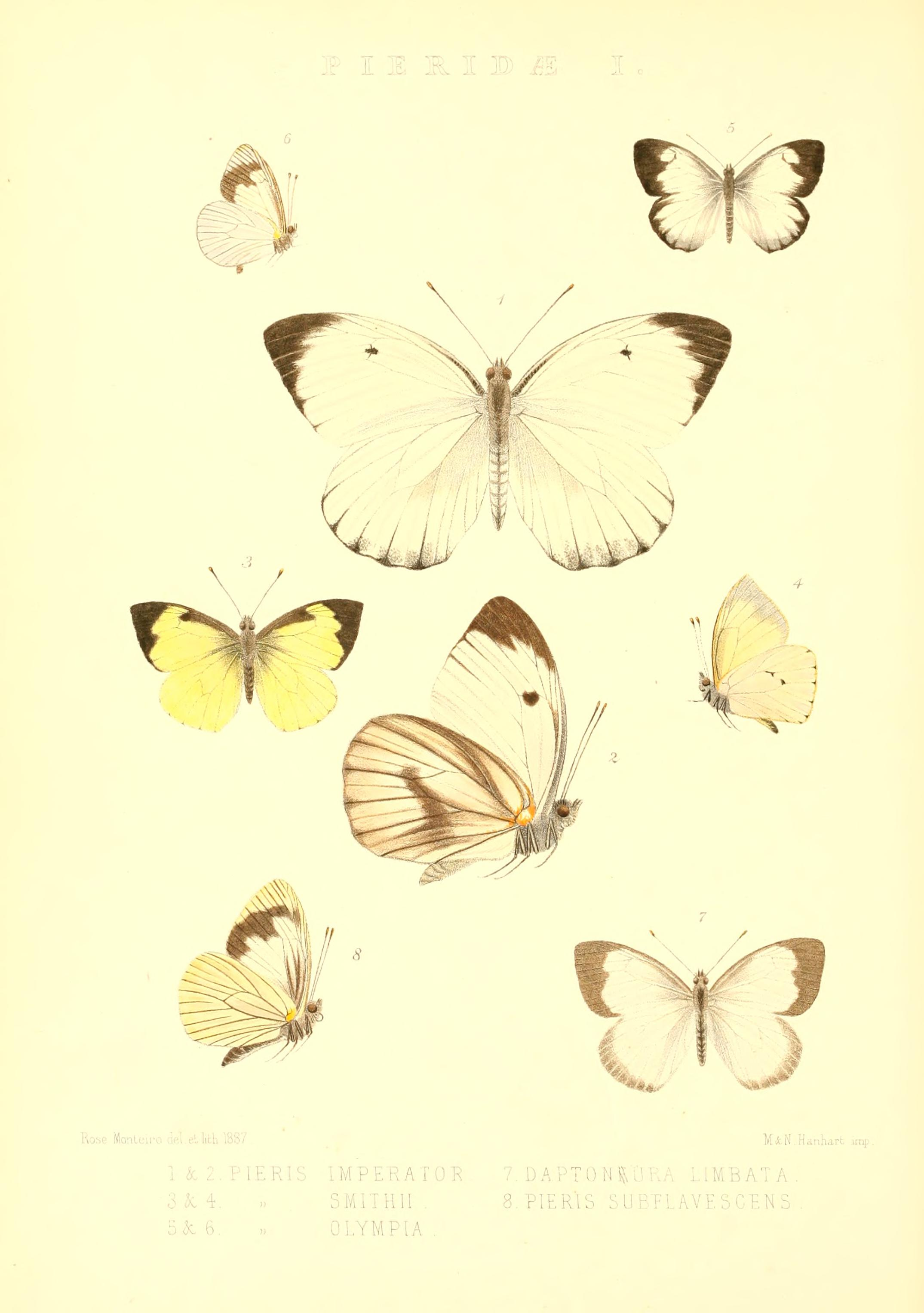
- Figure 8

Scientific classification
- Kingdom: Animalia
- Phylum: Arthropoda
- Class: Insecta
- Order: Lepidoptera
- Family: Pieridae
- Genus: Leptophobia
- Species: L. tovaria

Binomial name
- Leptophobia tovaria (C. & R. Felder, 1861)

Synonyms
- Pieris tovaria C. & R. Felder, 1861

= Leptophobia tovaria =

Species of butterfly

Leptophobia tovaria, the tovaria white, is a butterfly in the family Pieridae. It is found in Peru, Venezuela, Ecuador and Colombia.

The wingspan is about 45 mm (1.8 in).

== Subspecies ==
The following subspecies are recognised:

- Leptophobia tovaria tovaria (Venezuela)
- Leptophobia tovaria subflavescens (Kirby, 1887) (Colombia)
- Leptophobia tovaria maruga Fruhstorfer, 1908 (Ecuador)
- Leptophobia tovaria gina Fruhstorfer, 1908 (Peru)
