= Anadia pamplonensis =

Conservation status
- Endangered (IUCN 3.1)

Scientific classification
- Kingdom: Animalia
- Phylum: Chordata
- Class: Reptilia
- Order: Squamata
- Suborder: Lacertoidea
- Family: Gymnophthalmidae
- Genus: Anadia
- Species: A. pamplonensis

Binomial name
- Anadia pamplonensis Dunn, 1944

Species of lizard

Anadia pamplonensis, the Pamplona anadia, is a species of lizard in the family Gymnophthalmidae. It is found in Venezuela and Colombia.
