= Leptophobia diaguita =

Scientific classification
- Kingdom: Animalia
- Phylum: Arthropoda
- Class: Insecta
- Order: Lepidoptera
- Family: Pieridae
- Genus: Leptophobia
- Species: L. diaguita

Binomial name
- Leptophobia diaguita Jörgensen, 1916

Synonyms
- Leptophobia latifascia Joicey & Talbot, 1928

Species of butterfly

Leptophobia diaguita is a butterfly in the family Pieridae first described by Peter Jörgensen in 1916. It is found in Argentina, Peru and Ecuador.

== Subspecies ==
The following subspecies are recognised:

- Leptophobia diaguita diaguita (Argentina)
- Leptophobia diaguita latifascia Joicey & Talbot, 1928 (Peru, Ecuador)
- Leptophobia diaguita mandor Lamas, 2003 (Peru)
