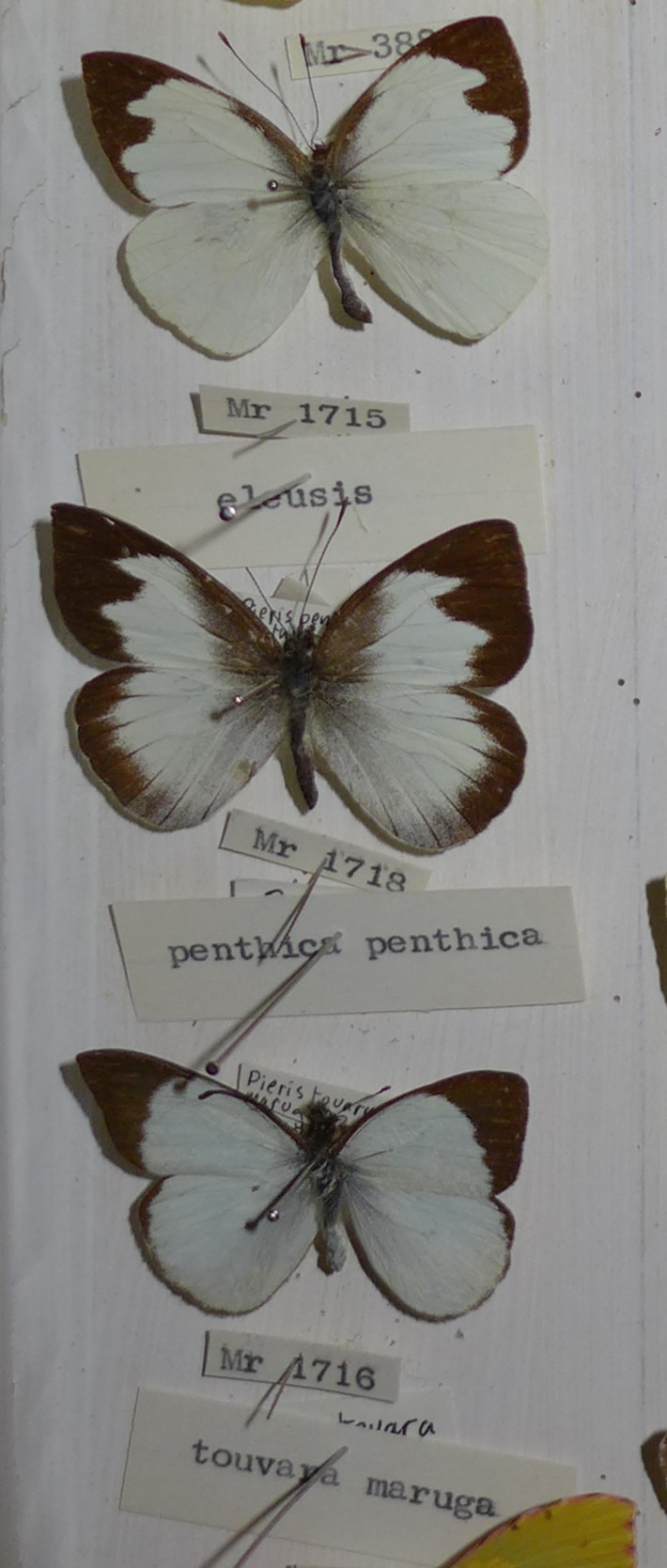

Scientific classification
- Kingdom: Animalia
- Phylum: Arthropoda
- Class: Insecta
- Order: Lepidoptera
- Family: Pieridae
- Genus: Leptophobia
- Species: L. eleusis

Binomial name
- Leptophobia eleusis (H. Lucas, 1852)

Synonyms
- Pieris eleusis H. Lucas, 1852; Pieris suadella C. Felder & R. Felder, 1861; Pieris cinnia falledra Fruhstorfer, 1908; Pieris eleusis Doubleday, 1847 (nom. nud.)

= Leptophobia eleusis =

Species of butterfly

Leptophobia eleusis, the Eleusis white, is a butterfly in the family Pieridae. The species was first described by Hippolyte Lucas in 1852. It is found from Venezuela to Bolivia.

The wingspan is 42–48 mm (1.7–1.9 in).

The larvae feed on Brassica species.

== Subspecies ==
The following subspecies are recognised:

- Leptophobia eleusis eleusis (Colombia, Venezuela)
- Leptophobia eleusis mollitica Fruhstorfer, 1908 (Peru, Ecuador)
