= Anadia hobarti =

Conservation status
- Least Concern (IUCN 3.1)

Scientific classification
- Kingdom: Animalia
- Phylum: Chordata
- Class: Reptilia
- Order: Squamata
- Family: Gymnophthalmidae
- Genus: Anadia
- Species: A. hobarti

Binomial name
- Anadia hobarti La Marca & García-Pérez, 1990

Species of lizard

Anadia hobarti, also known commonly as Hobart's anadia, is a species of lizard in the family Gymnophthalmidae. The species is endemic to Venezuela.

== Etymology ==
The specific name, hobarti, is in honor of American herpetologist Hobart Muir Smith.

== Geographic range ==
A. hobarti is found in northwestern Venezuela, in the Venezuelan state of Trujillo.

== Habitat ==
The preferred natural habitats of A. hobarti are grassland and forest, at an altitude of 2,625 m (8,612 ft).

== Reproduction ==
A. hobarti is oviparous. Females lay eggs in communal nests.
