= Leptophobia philoma =

Scientific classification
- Kingdom: Animalia
- Phylum: Arthropoda
- Class: Insecta
- Order: Lepidoptera
- Family: Pieridae
- Genus: Leptophobia
- Species: L. philoma

Binomial name
- Leptophobia philoma (Hewitson, 1870)

Synonyms
- Pieris philoma Hewitson, 1870; Leptophobia subargentea Butler, 1898; Leptophobia subargentea lia Fruhstorfer, 1908

Species of butterfly

Leptophobia philoma, the philoma white, is a butterfly in the family Pieridae. It is found in Peru, Ecuador and Bolivia.

The wingspan is about 50 mm (2.0 in).

== Subspecies ==
The following subspecies are recognised:

- Leptophobia philoma philoma (Ecuador)
- Leptophobia philoma subargentea Butler, 1898 (Peru, Bolivia)
- Leptophobia philoma pastaza (Joicey & Talbot, 1928) (Ecuador)
