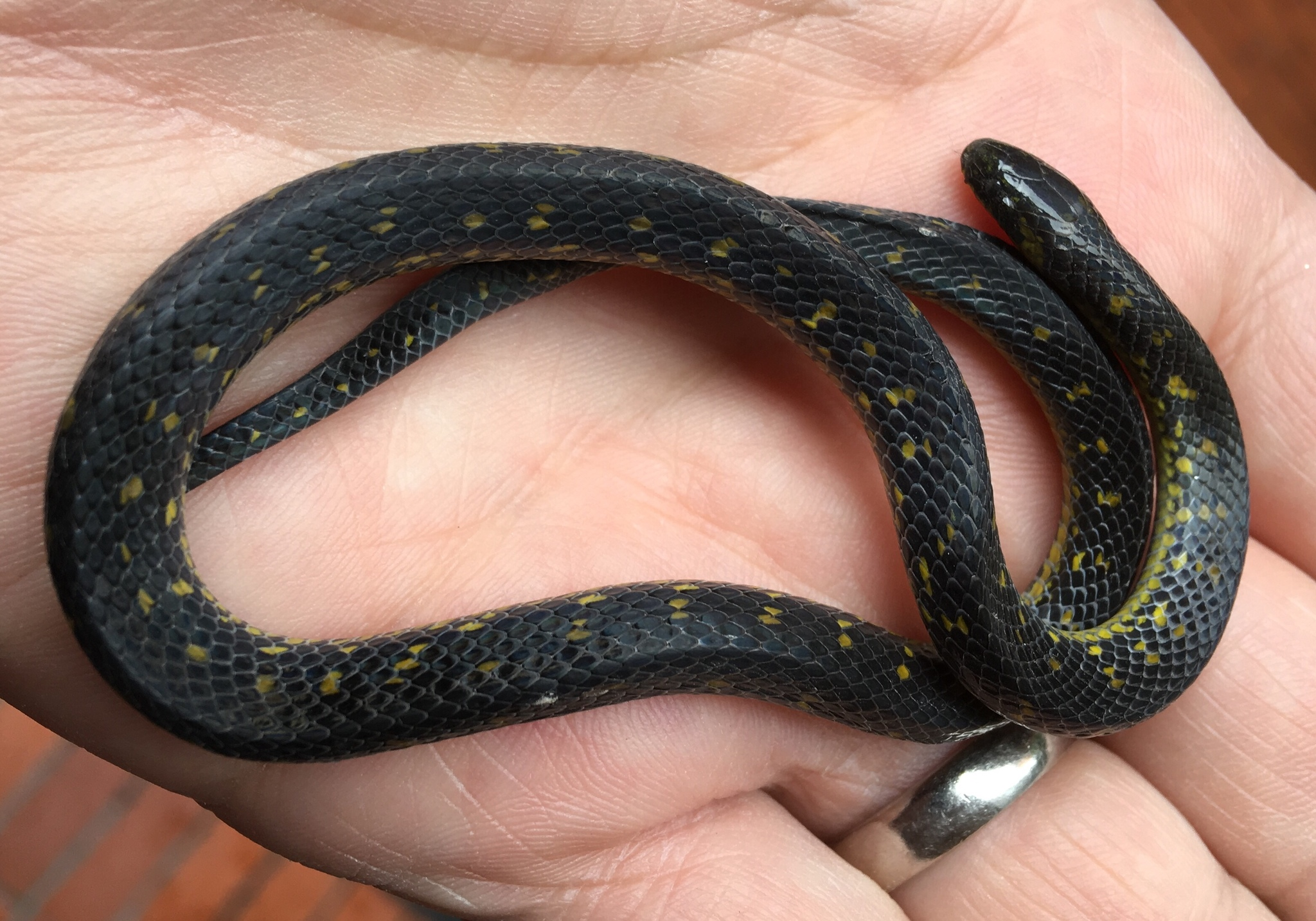

Conservation status
- Least Concern (IUCN 3.1)

Scientific classification
- Kingdom: Animalia
- Phylum: Chordata
- Class: Reptilia
- Order: Squamata
- Suborder: Serpentes
- Family: Colubridae
- Genus: Atractus
- Species: A. crassicaudatus

Binomial name
- Atractus crassicaudatus (A.M.C. Duméril, Bibron & A. Duméril, 1854)
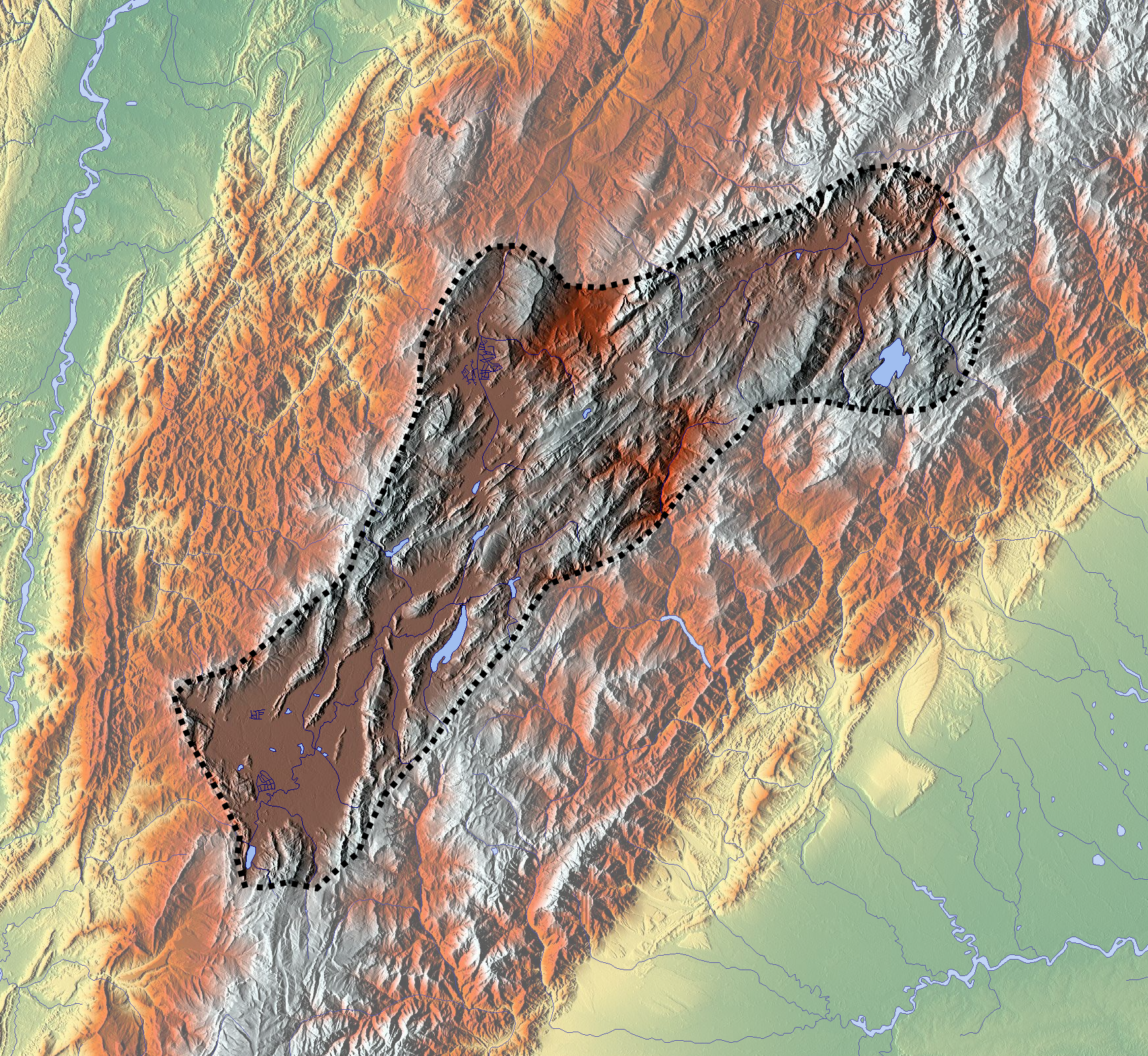
- The thickhead ground snake is endemic to the Altiplano Cundiboyacense

Synonyms
- Rabdosoma crassicaudatum A.M.C. Duméril, Bibron & A. Duméril, 1854

= Thickhead ground snake =

Species of snake

The thickhead ground snake (Atractus crassicaudatus) is a nonvenomous colubrid snake species, with no recognized subspecies, endemic to central Colombia.

== Description ==
The thickhead ground snake is dark purplish-brown or blackish both dorsally and ventrally, with small, yellowish spots dorsally, and larger ones ventrally. The first row of dorsal scales, next to the ventrals on each side, is yellowish. There is a yellowish blotch on each temple.

Its snout is obtuse. The rostral scale is small, the internasals are very small, and the prefrontals are as long as broad. The frontal is as long as or a little longer than broad, as long as its distance from the end of the snout, but much shorter than the parietals. The loreal scale is at least twice as long as it is high. Two postoculars are present; the temporals are 1+2. Seven upper labials (rarely six) occur, the third and fourth (or third) of which enter the orbit; the three lower labials contact the single pair of chin shields. The dorsal scales are smooth, in 17 rows. The ventrals are 146-161 in count. The anal scale is entire, with 19-27 paired subcaudal scales.

Adults may attain 42 centimetres (17 in) in total length. The length of the tail is about 1/10 of the total length.

== Distribution ==
The snake is endemic to the Altiplano Cundiboyacense, where it is found at altitudes between 2,000 and 3,200 metres (6,600 and 10,500 ft). This snake is reportedly particularly common in the area around the capital district of Bogotá, the Eastern Hills of Bogotá, and Lake Herrera on the Bogotá savanna.

== See also ==
- List of flora and fauna of the Eastern Hills, Bogotá
