= Anadia steyeri =

Conservation status
- Least Concern (IUCN 3.1)

Scientific classification
- Kingdom: Animalia
- Phylum: Chordata
- Class: Reptilia
- Order: Squamata
- Family: Gymnophthalmidae
- Genus: Anadia
- Species: A. steyeri

Binomial name
- Anadia steyeri Nieden, 1914

Species of lizard

Anadia steyeri, also known commonly as Steyer's anadia, is a species of lizard in the family Gymnophthalmidae. The species is endemic to Venezuela.

== Etymology ==
The specific name, steyeri, is in honor of a Dr. Steyer of the Naturhistorisches Museum in Lübeck, Germany.

== Geographic range ==
A. steyeri is found in northwestern Venezuela, in the Venezuelan states of Aragua, Carabobo, and Falcón.

== Habitat ==
The preferred natural habitat of A. steyeri is forest, at altitudes of 400–700 m (1,300–2,300 ft).

== Reproduction ==
A. steyeri is oviparous.
