= Anadia vittata =

Conservation status
- Least Concern (IUCN 3.1)

Scientific classification
- Kingdom: Animalia
- Phylum: Chordata
- Class: Reptilia
- Order: Squamata
- Suborder: Lacertoidea
- Family: Gymnophthalmidae
- Genus: Anadia
- Species: A. vittata

Binomial name
- Anadia vittata Boulenger, 1913

Species of lizard

Anadia vittata, Boulenger's anadia, is a species of lizard in the family Gymnophthalmidae. It is found in Panama and Colombia.
