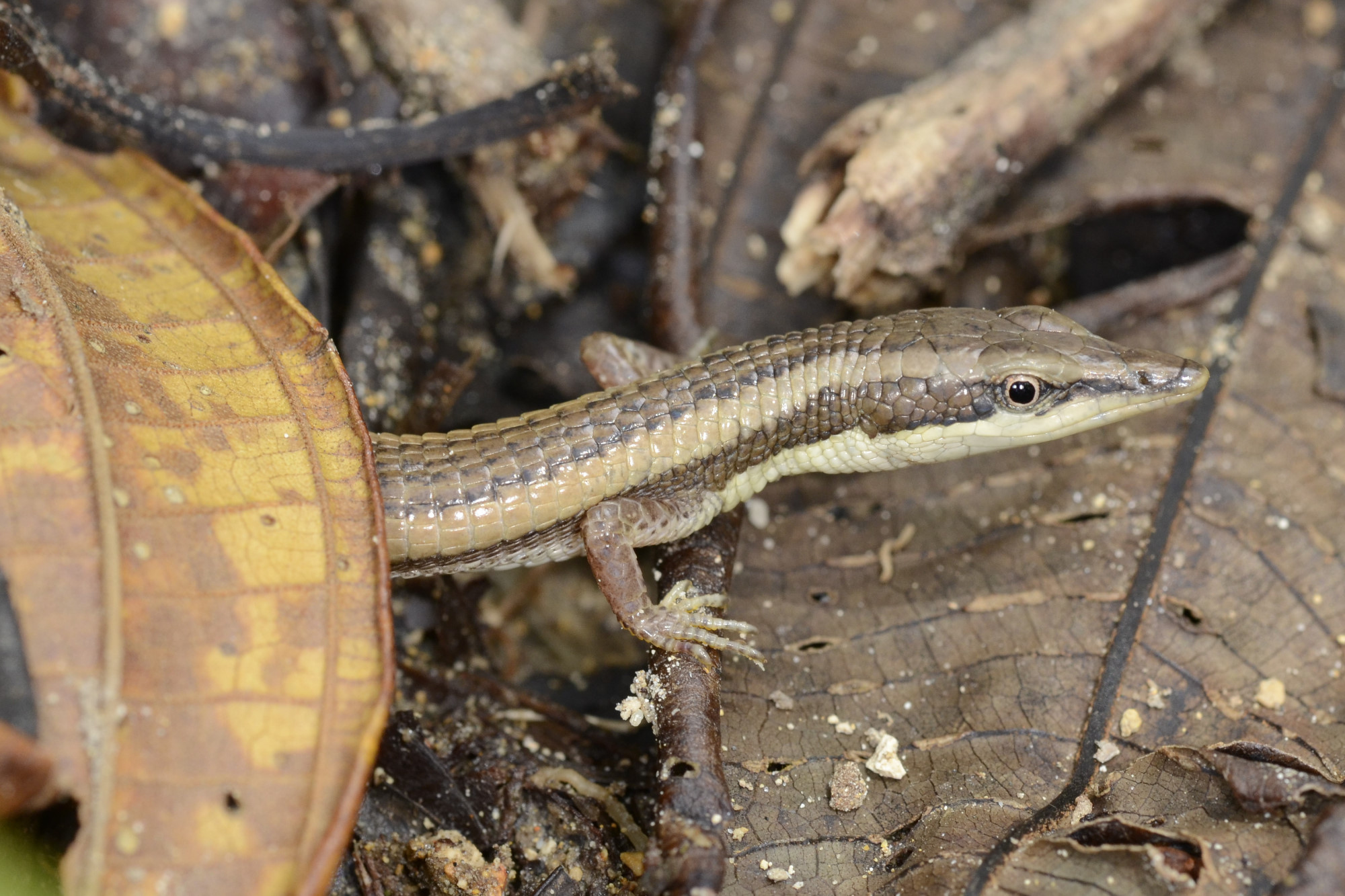
- Anadia rhombifera

Scientific classification
- Kingdom: Animalia
- Phylum: Chordata
- Class: Reptilia
- Order: Squamata
- Family: Gymnophthalmidae
- Subfamily: Cercosaurinae
- Tribe: Cercosaurini
- Genus: Anadia; Gray, 1845

Species
- 19 species (see text)

= Anadia (lizard) =

Genus of lizards

Anadia is a genus of lizards in the family Gymnophthalmidae. The genus is endemic to southern Central America and northern South America.

== Species ==
The following species are recognized as being valid.

- Anadia altaserrania Harris & Ayala, 1987
- Anadia bitaeniata Boulenger, 1903 – two-banded anadia
- Anadia blakei K.P. Schmidt, 1932 – Blake's anadia
- Anadia bogotensis (W. Peters, 1863) – Bogota anadia
- Anadia brevifrontalis (Boulenger, 1903) – shorthead anadia
- Anadia buenaventura Betancourt, Reyes-Puig, Lobos, Yánez-Muñoz & Torres-Carvajal, 2018
- Anadia bumanguesa Rueda-Almonacid & Caicedo, 2004
- Anadia escalerae Myers, Rivas & Jadin, 2009
- Anadia hobarti La Marca & García-Pérez, 1990 – Hobart's anadia
- Anadia hollandi Amezquita, Daza, Barragan-Contreras, Orejuela, Baarientos, & Mazariegos, 2022
- Anadia marmorata (Gray, 1846) – spotted anadia
- Anadia ocellata Gray, 1845 – ocellated anadia
- Anadia pamplonensis Dunn, 1944 – Pamplona anadia
- Anadia pariaensis Rivas, La Marca & Oliveros, 1999
- Anadia petersi Oftedal, 1974 – Peters' anadia
- Anadia pulchella Ruthven, 1926 – Ruthven's anadia
- Anadia rhombifera (Günther, 1859) – rhombifer anadia
- Anadia steyeri Nieden, 1914 – Steyer's anadia
- Anadia vittata Boulenger, 1913 – Boulenger's anadia

Nota bene: A binomial authority in parentheses indicates that the species was originally described in a genus other than Anadia.
