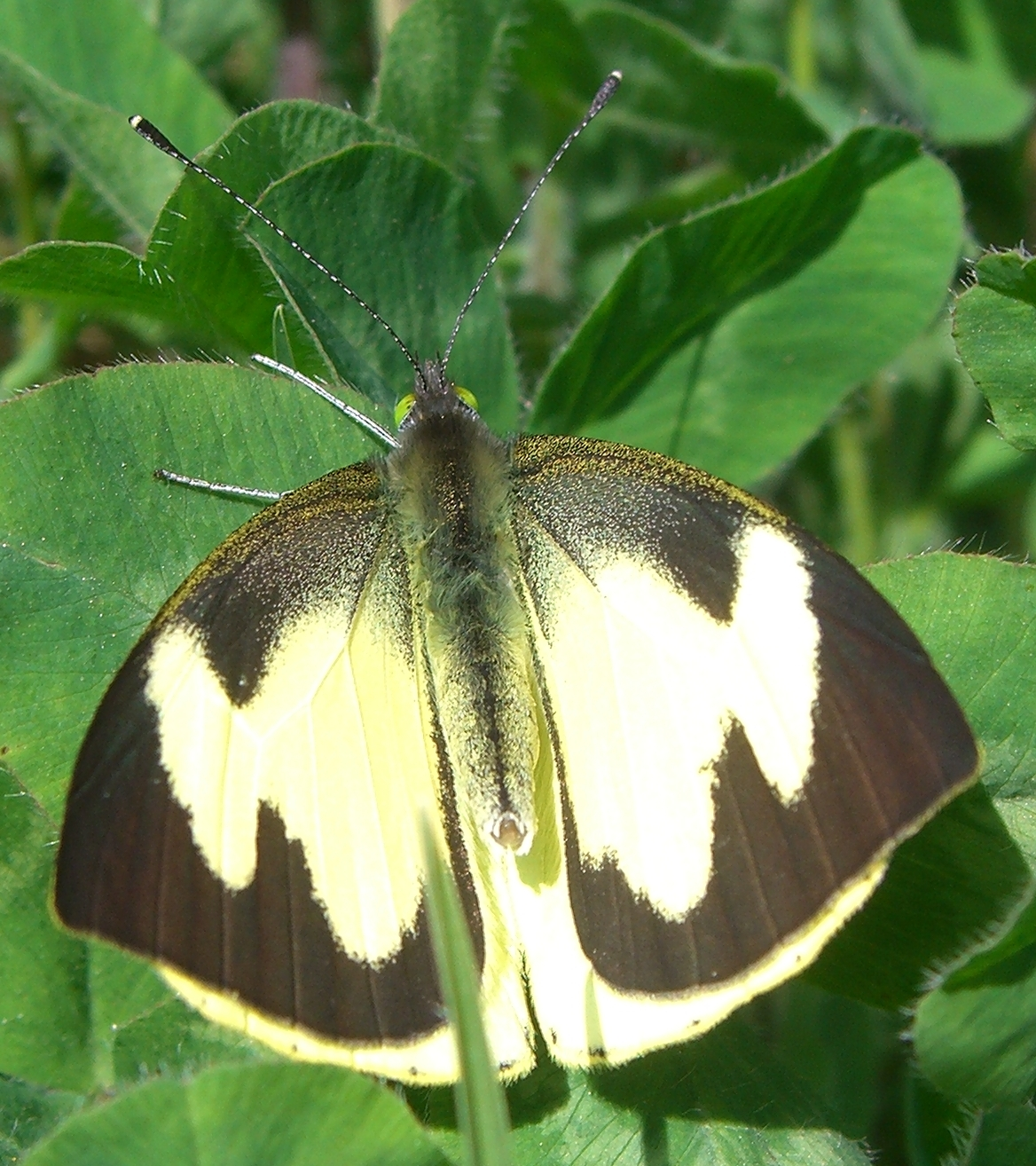

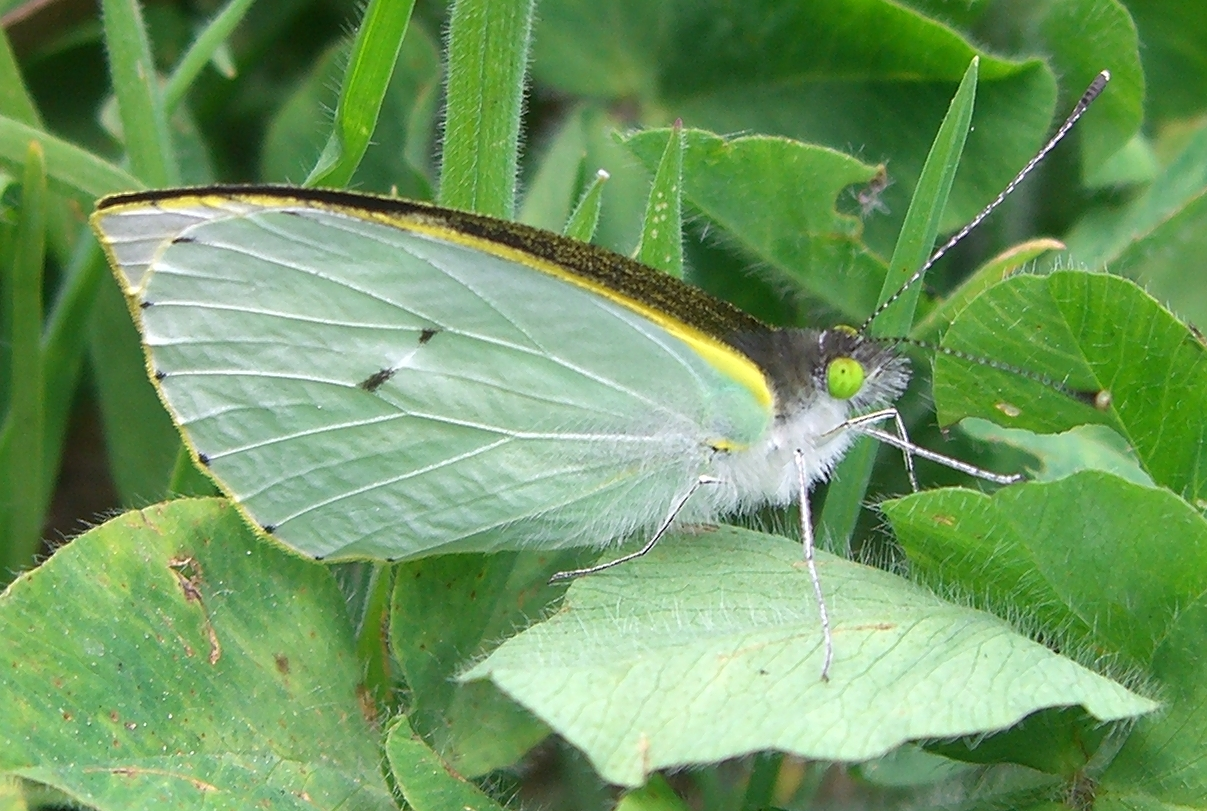

Scientific classification
- Kingdom: Animalia
- Phylum: Arthropoda
- Class: Insecta
- Order: Lepidoptera
- Family: Pieridae
- Genus: Leptophobia
- Species: L. eleone

Binomial name
- Leptophobia eleone (Doubleday, 1847)

Synonyms
- Pieris eleone Doubleday, [1847]; Leptophobia eleone ab. ochracea Röber, 1908

= Leptophobia eleone =

Species of butterfly

Leptophobia eleone, the silky wanderer or eleone white, is a butterfly in the family Pieridae. It is found from Colombia to Bolivia. The habitat consists of cloud forests.

The larvae feed on Tropaeolum species.

== Subspecies ==
The following subspecies are recognised:

- Leptophobia eleone eleone (Colombia)
- Leptophobia eleone luca Fruhstorfer, 1907 (Ecuador, Bolivia)
