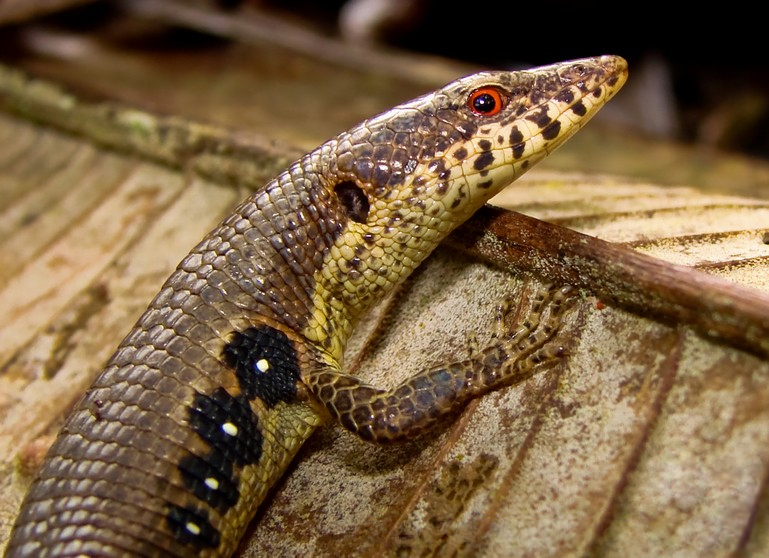

Conservation status
- Least Concern (IUCN 3.1)

Scientific classification
- Kingdom: Animalia
- Phylum: Chordata
- Class: Reptilia
- Order: Squamata
- Suborder: Lacertoidea
- Family: Gymnophthalmidae
- Genus: Anadia
- Species: A. rhombifera

Binomial name
- Anadia rhombifera (Günther, 1859)

= Anadia rhombifera =

Species of lizard

Anadia rhombifera, the rhombifer anadia, is a species of lizard in the family Gymnophthalmidae. It is found in Colombia and Ecuador.
