= Leptophobia nephthis =

Scientific classification
- Kingdom: Animalia
- Phylum: Arthropoda
- Clade: Pancrustacea
- Class: Insecta
- Order: Lepidoptera
- Family: Pieridae
- Genus: Leptophobia
- Species: L. nephthis

Binomial name
- Leptophobia nephthis (Hopffer, 1874)

Synonyms
- Pieris nephthis Hopffer, 1874; Leptophobia pinara aymara Fruhstorfer, 1908

Species of butterfly

Leptophobia nephthis is a butterfly in the family Pieridae. It is found in Peru and Bolivia.
