= Leptophobia erinna =

Scientific classification
- Kingdom: Animalia
- Phylum: Arthropoda
- Class: Insecta
- Order: Lepidoptera
- Family: Pieridae
- Genus: Leptophobia
- Species: L. erinna

Binomial name
- Leptophobia erinna (Hopffer, 1874)

Synonyms
- Pieris erinna Hopffer, 1874; Leptophobia cinnia Fruhstorfer, 1908

Species of butterfly

Leptophobia erinna is a butterfly in the family Pieridae. It is found in Peru and Ecuador.
