= Anadia pariaensis =

Conservation status
- Endangered (IUCN 3.1)

Scientific classification
- Kingdom: Animalia
- Phylum: Chordata
- Class: Reptilia
- Order: Squamata
- Family: Gymnophthalmidae
- Genus: Anadia
- Species: A. pariaensis

Binomial name
- Anadia pariaensis Rivas, La Marca & Oliveros, 1999

Species of lizard

Anadia pariaensis is a species of lizard in the family Gymnophthalmidae. It is endemic to Venezuela.
