= Leptophobia forsteri =

Scientific classification
- Kingdom: Animalia
- Phylum: Arthropoda
- Class: Insecta
- Order: Lepidoptera
- Family: Pieridae
- Genus: Leptophobia
- Species: L. forsteri

Binomial name
- Leptophobia forsteri Baumann & Reissinger, 1969

Species of butterfly

Leptophobia forsteri is a butterfly in the family Pieridae. It is found in Peru, Colombia and Venezuela.

The wingspan is about 52 mm (2.0 in).
