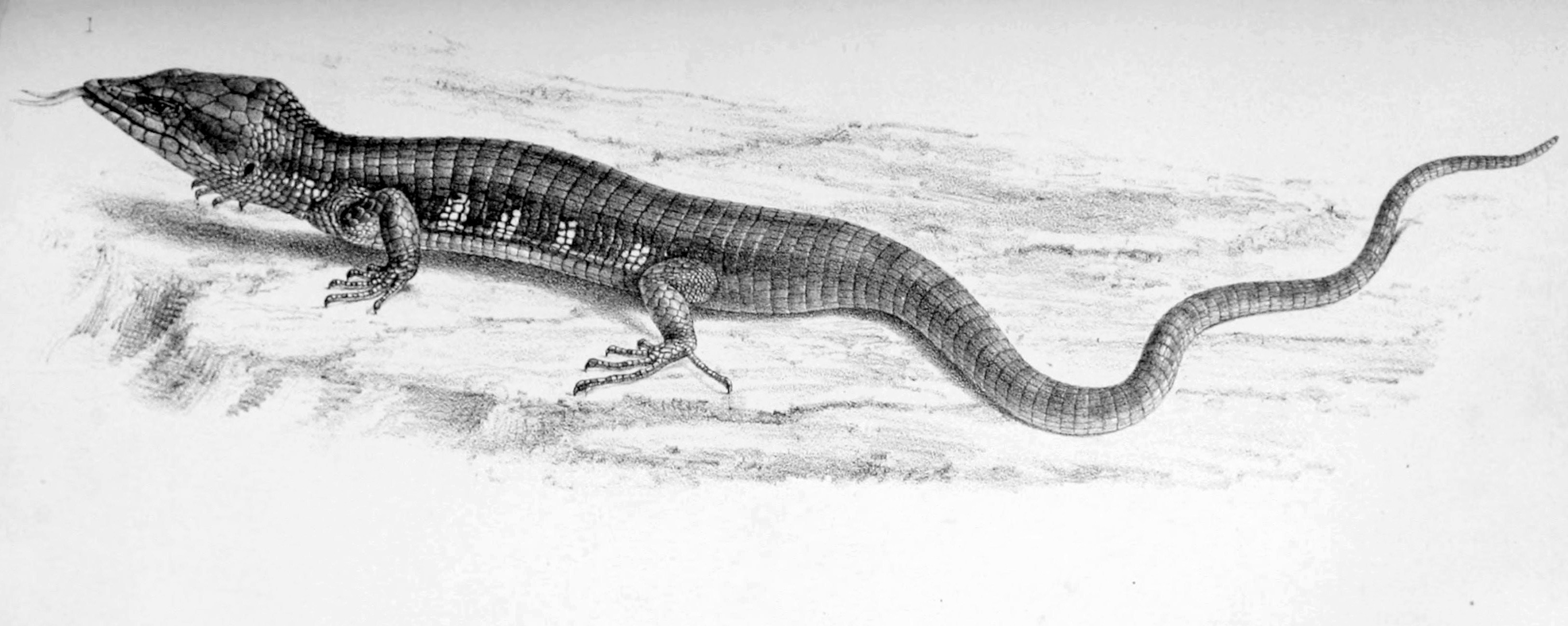

Conservation status
- Least Concern (IUCN 3.1)

Scientific classification
- Kingdom: Animalia
- Phylum: Chordata
- Class: Reptilia
- Order: Squamata
- Suborder: Lacertoidea
- Family: Gymnophthalmidae
- Genus: Anadia
- Species: A. marmorata

Binomial name
- Anadia marmorata (JE Gray, 1846)

= Anadia marmorata =

Species of lizard

Anadia marmorata, the spotted anadia, is a species of lizard in the family Gymnophthalmidae. It is endemic to Venezuela.
