= Anadia hollandi =

Scientific classification
- Kingdom: Animalia
- Phylum: Chordata
- Order: Squamata
- Family: Gymnophthalmidae
- Genus: Anadia
- Species: A. hollandi

Binomial name
- Anadia hollandi Amezquita, Daza, Barragan-Contreras, Orejuela, Baarientos, & Mazariegos, 2022

Species of lizard

Anadia hollandi is a species of lizard in the family Gymnophthalmidae. It is endemic to Colombia.
