= Emmet Reid Blake =

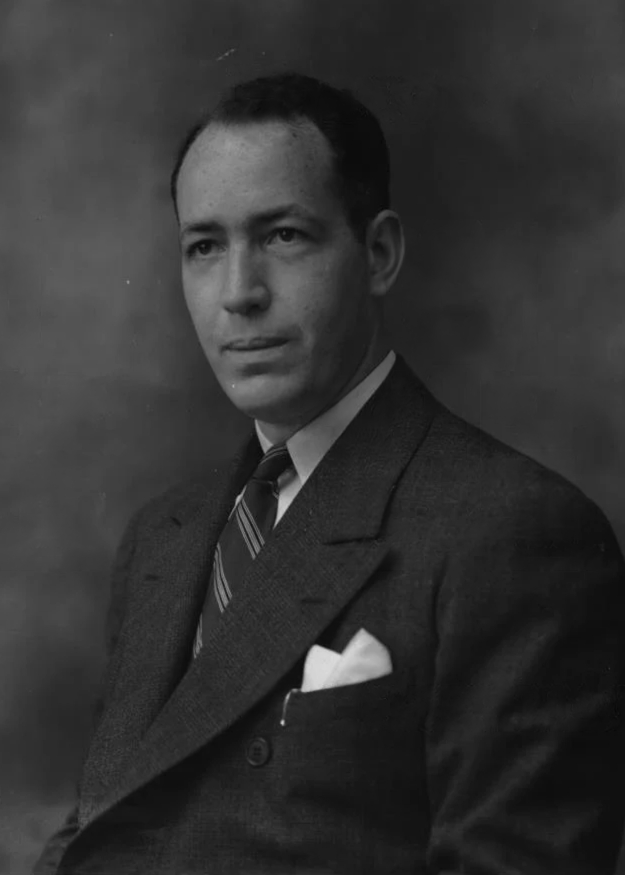
Press photo in 1940

Emmet Reid Blake (29 November 1908 – 10 January 1997) was an American ornithologist, collector, and curator of birds at the Field Museum of Natural History, Chicago. During his career he made expeditions across South America and collected nearly 20,000 specimens of birds and described several new species. He also wrote a major book on the birds of Mexico and began a five volume treatise on the Neotropical birds.

== Life and work ==
Blake was born in Abbeville County, South Carolina and grew up near Greenwood, South Carolina where he roamed the forests and became interested in nature as a child. A relative taught him how to skin and prepare bird specimens. He joined Presbyterian College where his penchant for collecting animals, especially reptiles, gave him the nickname of "Snaky" Blake although in later life he was known to his friends as "Bob". After graduating in 1928 he roller-skated from Greenwood to the University of Pittsburgh where he worked at a petrol pump at night to support himself while a part-time graduate student. He also proved himself a good boxer and nearly worked as a boxing trainer in the YMCA. Even as a student he joined a National Geographic Expedition under Ernest Holt along the Rio Negro on the border of Brazil and Venezuela. He was hired by Leon Mandel in 1931 to collect specimens for the Field Museum. After completing his MS in 1933 at the University of Pittsburgh, he was again invited to join an expedition to Guatemala, followed again by another in Belize for Carnegie Museum. He joined the Field Museum staff in 1935 and continued to work almost until his death. He joined the US Army Counter Intelligence Corps towards the end of World War II and was posted in northern Africa. He received a Purple Heart for his service. In 1953 he published the Birds of Mexico. He also helped in revising Peters' Checklist of the Birds of the World. In 1977 he published the first volume of the Manual of Neotropical Birds but the remaining four volumes were completed by others after his death.

Blake was an old-school faunistics-oriented ornithologist and he was one of the authors of a note in the Auk that berated new ecological approaches. He married Margaret Bird and they had two daughters. He died at Evanston, Illinois.

Blake is commemorated in the scientific name of species of Venezuelan lizard, Anadia blakei.
