= Flat Andes anole =

There are two species of lizard named flat Andes anole:

- Anolis heterodermus
- Anolis richteri
