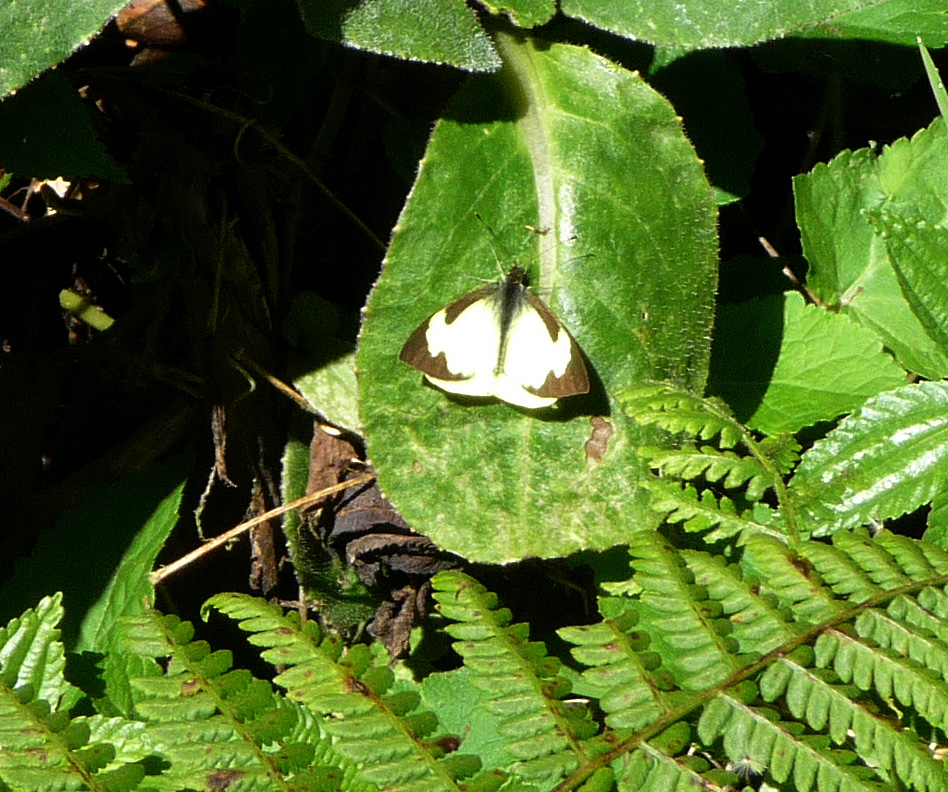

Scientific classification
- Kingdom: Animalia
- Phylum: Arthropoda
- Class: Insecta
- Order: Lepidoptera
- Family: Pieridae
- Genus: Leptophobia
- Species: L. pinara

Binomial name
- Leptophobia pinara (C. & R. Felder, 1865)

Synonyms
- Pieris pinara C. & R. Felder, 1865

= Leptophobia pinara =

Species of butterfly

Leptophobia pinara, the Pinara white, is a butterfly in the family Pieridae. It is found in Peru, Ecuador and Colombia.

The wingspan is about 47–50 mm (1.9–2.0 in).
