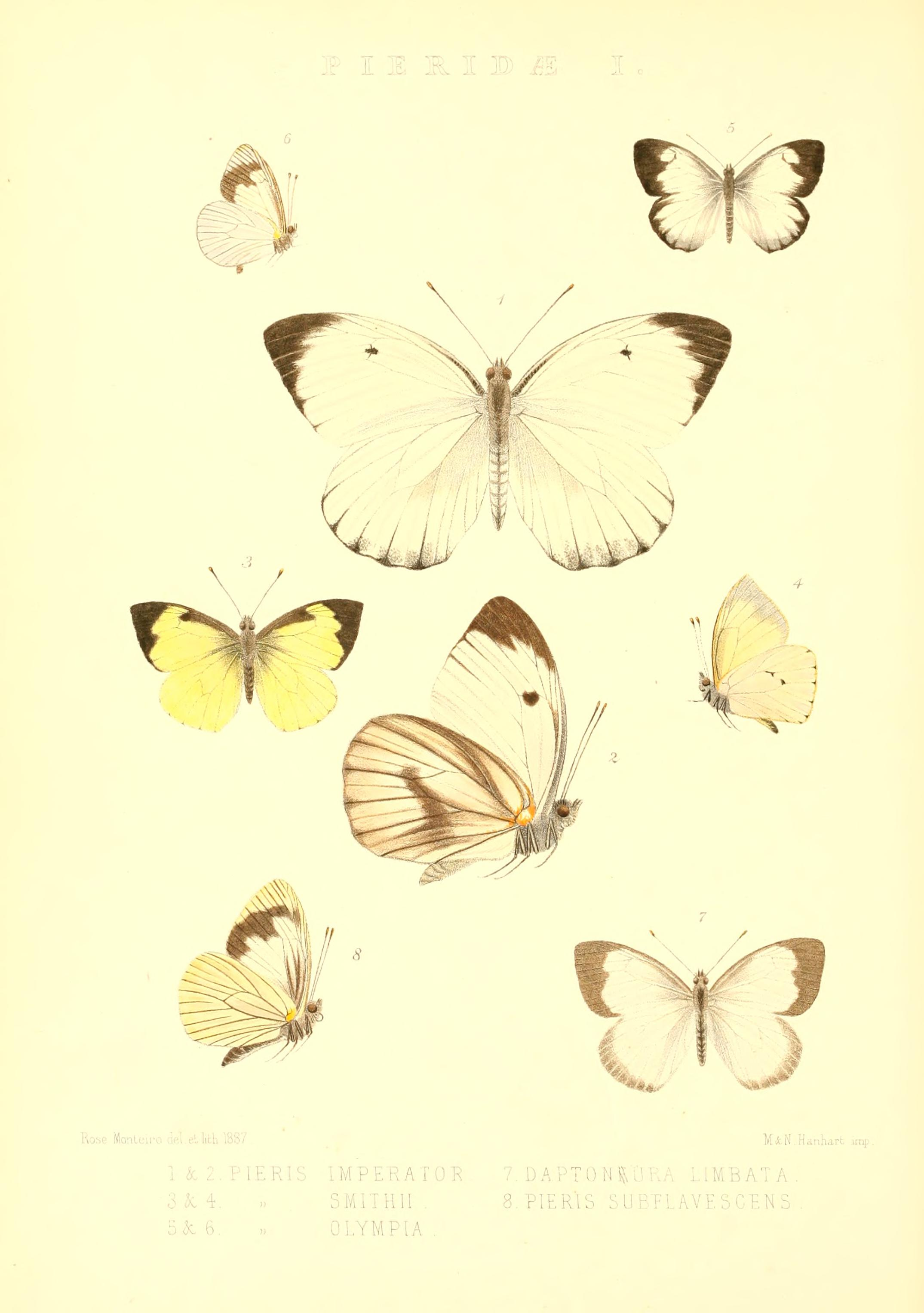

Scientific classification
- Kingdom: Animalia
- Phylum: Arthropoda
- Class: Insecta
- Order: Lepidoptera
- Family: Pieridae
- Genus: Leptophobia
- Species: L. helena

Binomial name
- Leptophobia helena (H. Lucas, 1852)

Synonyms
- Pieris helena H. Lucas, 1852; Leptophobia smithii

= Leptophobia helena =

Species of butterfly

Leptophobia helena, the Helena white, is a butterfly in the family Pieridae. The species was first described by Hippolyte Lucas in 1852. It is found in Colombia, Bolivia, Peru and Ecuador.

The wingspan is 38–42 mm (1.5–1.7 in).

== Subspecies ==
The following subspecies are recognised:

- Leptophobia helena helena (Ecuador)
- Leptophobia helena smithii (Kirby, 1881) (Bolivia, Peru, Ecuador)
- Leptophobia helena doubledayi Röber, 1908 (Bolivia)
- Leptophobia helena hughesi Lamas, 2003 (Peru)
