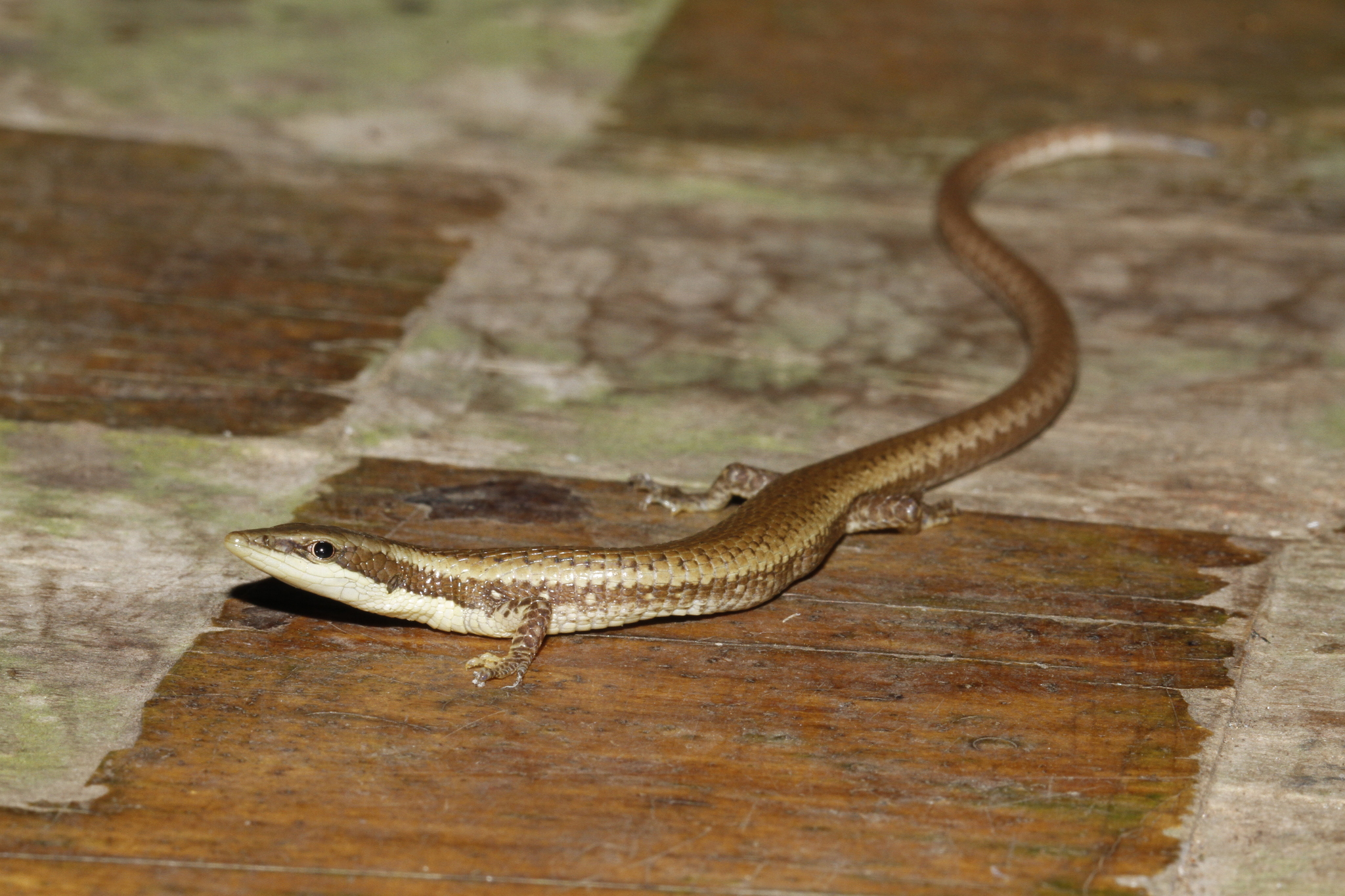

Conservation status
- Least Concern (IUCN 3.1)

Scientific classification
- Kingdom: Animalia
- Phylum: Chordata
- Class: Reptilia
- Order: Squamata
- Suborder: Lacertoidea
- Family: Gymnophthalmidae
- Genus: Anadia
- Species: A. ocellata

Binomial name
- Anadia ocellata Gray, 1845

Synonyms
- Anadia ocellata Gray, 1845; Ecleopus (Euspondylus) ocellatus — W. Peters, 1862; Chalcidolepis metallicus Cope, 1875; Leposoma ocellatum — Cope, 1885; Anadia metallica — Boulenger, 1885; Anadia ocellata — J. Peters & Donoso-Barros, 1970

= Anadia ocellata =

Species of lizard

Anadia ocellata, commonly known as the ocellated anadia or ocellated bromeliad lizard , is a species of lizard endemic to the Americas.

== Description ==
A. ocellata is a small and slender lizard. Its body is cylindrical with a long tail that is very sensitive and quickly subject to autotomy when in danger or when manipulated inadequately.

== Geographic range ==
A. ocellata is distributed from Costa Rica to Ecuador.

== Habitat and behavior ==
A. ocellata is rather unusual for a lizard in that it has frequently been found in, or close to, bromeliads. Thus its habits are considered arboreal, which would account for its scarceness.
