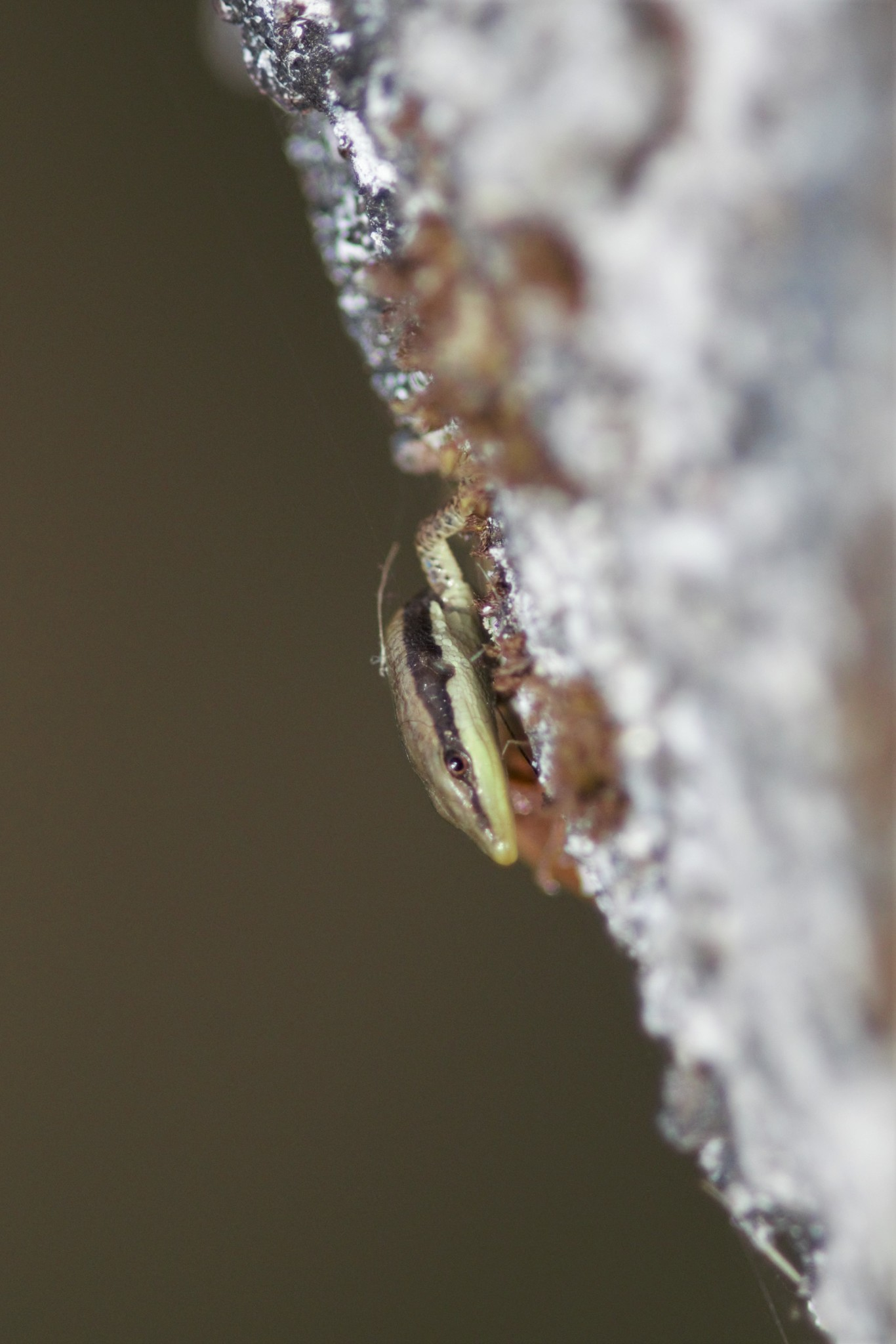

Conservation status
- Near Threatened (IUCN 3.1)

Scientific classification
- Kingdom: Animalia
- Phylum: Chordata
- Class: Reptilia
- Order: Squamata
- Family: Gymnophthalmidae
- Genus: Anadia
- Species: A. pulchella

Binomial name
- Anadia pulchella Ruthven, 1926

= Anadia pulchella =

Species of lizard

Anadia pulchella, Ruthven's anadia, is a species of lizard in the family Gymnophthalmidae. It is endemic to Colombia.
