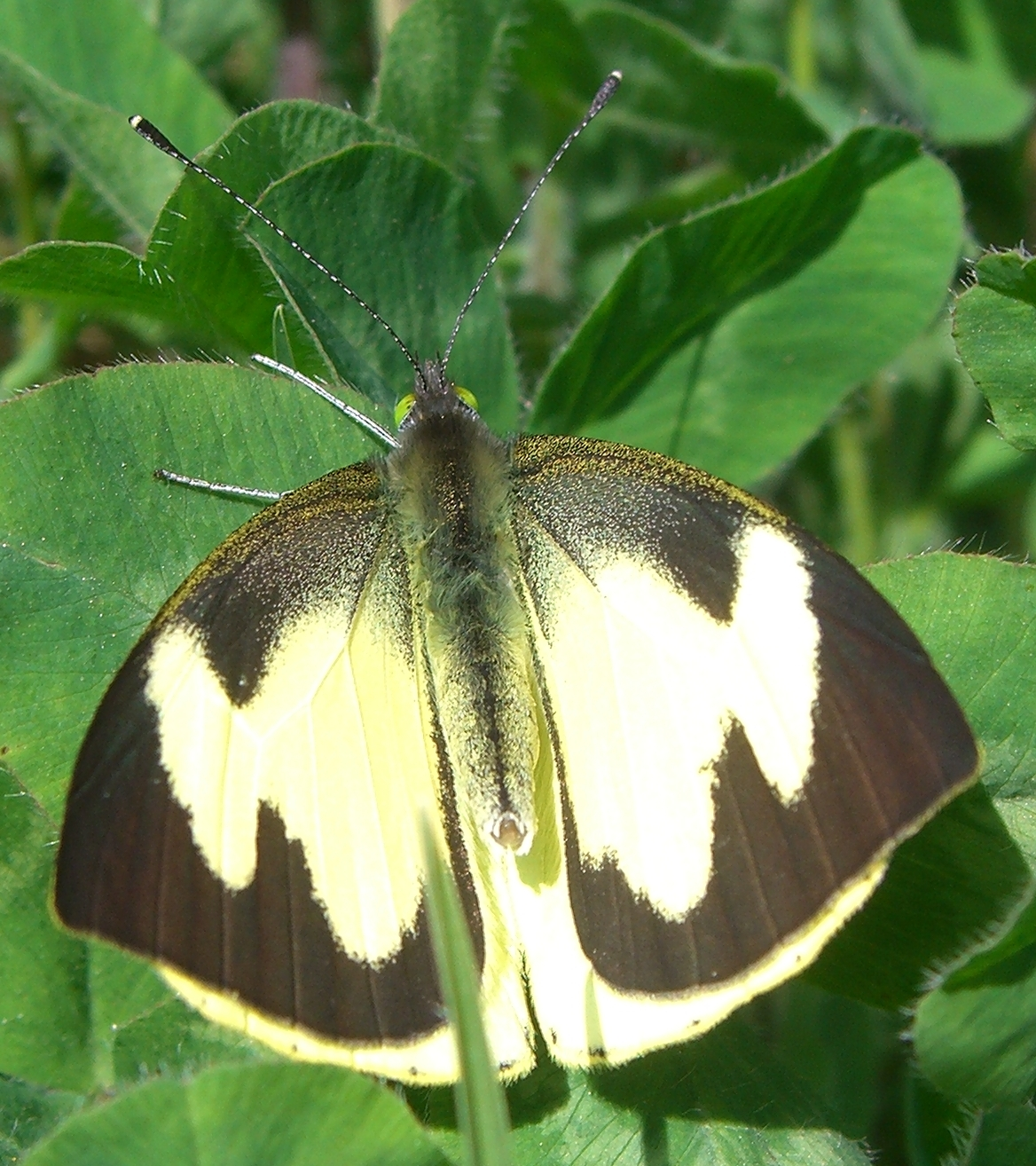

Scientific classification
- Kingdom: Animalia
- Phylum: Arthropoda
- Clade: Pancrustacea
- Class: Insecta
- Order: Lepidoptera
- Family: Pieridae
- Tribe: Pierini
- Genus: Leptophobia; Butler, 1870

Species
- See text.

= Leptophobia =

Butterfly genus in family Pieridae

Leptophobia is a Neotropical genus of butterflies in the family Pieridae.

== Species ==
- Leptophobia aripa (Boisduval, 1836)
- Leptophobia caesia (Lucas, 1852)
- Leptophobia cinerea (Hewitson, 1867)
- Leptophobia diaguita Jörgensen, 1916
- Leptophobia eleone (Doubleday, 1847)
- Leptophobia eleusis (Lucas, 1852)
- Leptophobia erinna (Hopffer, 1874)
- Leptophobia eucosma (Erschoff, 1875)
- Leptophobia forsteri Baumann & Reissinger, 1969
- Leptophobia gonzaga Fruhstorfer, 1908
- Leptophobia helena (Lucas, 1852)
- Leptophobia micaia Lamas, Pyrcz & Rodríguez, 2004
- Leptophobia nephthis (Hopffer, 1874)
- Leptophobia olympia (Felder, C & R Felder, 1861)
- Leptophobia penthica (Kollar, 1850)
- Leptophobia philoma (Hewitson, 1870)
- Leptophobia pinara (Felder, C & R Felder, 1865)
- Leptophobia tovaria (Felder, C & R Felder, 1861)
