= Leptophobia eucosma =

Scientific classification
- Kingdom: Animalia
- Phylum: Arthropoda
- Class: Insecta
- Order: Lepidoptera
- Family: Pieridae
- Genus: Leptophobia
- Species: L. eucosma

Binomial name
- Leptophobia eucosma (Erschoff, 1875)

Synonyms
- Pieris eucosma Erschoff, 1875; Leptophobia eleone luca f. euremoides Fruhstorfer, 1907

Species of butterfly

Leptophobia eucosma is a butterfly in the family Pieridae. It is found in Peru.

== Subspecies ==
The following subspecies are recognised:

- Leptophobia eucosma eucosma (Peru)
- Leptophobia eucosma euremoides Röber, 1908 (Peru)
