= Leptophobia cinerea =

Cinerea white

Scientific classification
- Kingdom: Animalia
- Phylum: Arthropoda
- Class: Insecta
- Order: Lepidoptera
- Family: Pieridae
- Genus: Leptophobia
- Species: L. cinerea

Binomial name
- Leptophobia cinerea (Hewitson, 1867)

Synonyms
- Pieris cinerea Hewitson, 1867; Pieris menthe Hopffer, 1874; Leptophobia cinerea litana Fruhstorfer, 1907

Species of butterfly

Leptophobia cinerea, the cinerea white, is a butterfly in the family Pieridae. It is found from Ecuador to Bolivia.

The wingspan is 45–58 mm (1.8–2.3 in).

== Subspecies ==
The following subspecies are recognised:

- Leptophobia cinerea cinerea (Ecuador)
- Leptophobia cinerea menthe (Hopffer, 1874) (Peru, Bolivia)
