= Anadia bumanguesa =

Conservation status
- Data Deficient (IUCN 3.1)

Scientific classification
- Kingdom: Animalia
- Phylum: Chordata
- Class: Reptilia
- Order: Squamata
- Family: Gymnophthalmidae
- Genus: Anadia
- Species: A. bumanguesa

Binomial name
- Anadia bumanguesa Rueda-Almonacid & Caicedo, 2004

Species of lizard

Anadia bumanguesa is a species of lizard in the family Gymnophthalmidae. It is endemic to Colombia.
