= Anadia blakei =

Conservation status
- Endangered (IUCN 3.1)

Scientific classification
- Kingdom: Animalia
- Phylum: Chordata
- Class: Reptilia
- Order: Squamata
- Family: Gymnophthalmidae
- Genus: Anadia
- Species: A. blakei

Binomial name
- Anadia blakei Schmidt, 1932

Species of lizard

Anadia blakei, also known commonly as Blake's anadia, is an endangered species of lizard in the family Gymnophthalmidae. The species is endemic to Venezuela.

== Etymology ==
A. blakei is named after American ornithologist Emmet "Bob" Reid Blake (1908–1997).

== Geographic range ==
A. blakei is found in the Venezuelan state of Sucre.

== Habitat ==
The preferred natural habitat of A. blakei is forest, at altitudes of 900–1,830 m (2,950–6,000 ft).

== Description ==
A. blakei has 28 scales around the body at midbody. It is uniformly brown dorsally, and paler ventrally. The holotype has a snout-to-vent length (SVL) of 9 cm (3.5 in), and a broken, incomplete tail.

== Diet ==
A. blakei preys upon insects, insect larvae, and slugs.

== Reproduction ==
A. blakei is oviparous.

== Conservation status ==
A. blakei is considered "Endangered" because of its small geographic range, and because of ongoing habitat loss from agricultural expansion and construction of roads and communication antennae.
