= Anadia brevifrontalis =

Conservation status
- Endangered (IUCN 3.1)

Scientific classification
- Kingdom: Animalia
- Phylum: Chordata
- Class: Reptilia
- Order: Squamata
- Family: Gymnophthalmidae
- Genus: Anadia
- Species: A. brevifrontalis

Binomial name
- Anadia brevifrontalis (Boulenger, 1903)

Synonyms
- Euspondylus brevifrontalis Boulenger, 1903

Species of lizard

Anadia brevifrontalis, the shorthead anadia, is a species of lizard in the family Gymnophthalmidae. It is endemic to Venezuela where it occurs in the Andes of the Mérida state.
