= Anadia petersi =

Conservation status
- Data Deficient (IUCN 3.1)

Scientific classification
- Kingdom: Animalia
- Phylum: Chordata
- Class: Reptilia
- Order: Squamata
- Family: Gymnophthalmidae
- Genus: Anadia
- Species: A. petersi

Binomial name
- Anadia petersi Oftedal, 1974

Species of lizard

Anadia petersi, also known commonly as Peters' anadia, is a species of lizard in the subfamily Cercosaurinae of the family Gymnophthalmidae. The species is endemic to Ecuador.

== Etymology ==
The specific name, petersi, is in honor of American herpetologist James A. Peters.

== Geographic distribution ==
Anadia petersi is found in Loja Province, Ecuador.

== Habitat ==
The preferred habitat of Anadia petersi is forest at an altitude of 1,700 m (5,600 ft).

== Reproduction ==
Anadia petersi is oviparous.
