= Anadia buenaventura =

Scientific classification
- Kingdom: Animalia
- Phylum: Chordata
- Class: Reptilia
- Order: Squamata
- Family: Gymnophthalmidae
- Genus: Anadia
- Species: A. buenaventura

Binomial name
- Anadia buenaventura Betancourt, Reyes-Puig, Lobos, Yánez-Muñoz, & Torres-Carvajal, 2018

Species of lizard

Anadia buenaventura is a species of lizard in the family Gymnophthalmidae. It is endemic to Ecuador.
