= Anadia bitaeniata =

Conservation status
- Least Concern (IUCN 3.1)

Scientific classification
- Kingdom: Animalia
- Phylum: Chordata
- Class: Reptilia
- Order: Squamata
- Family: Gymnophthalmidae
- Genus: Anadia
- Species: A. bitaeniata

Binomial name
- Anadia bitaeniata Boulenger, 1903

Species of lizard

Anadia bitaeniata, the two-banded anadia, is a species of lizard in the family Gymnophthalmidae. It is endemic to the Sierra de la Culata in the Andes of Venezuela.
