= Anadia escalerae =

Conservation status
- Least Concern (IUCN 3.1)

Scientific classification
- Kingdom: Animalia
- Phylum: Chordata
- Class: Reptilia
- Order: Squamata
- Family: Gymnophthalmidae
- Genus: Anadia
- Species: A. escalerae

Binomial name
- Anadia escalerae Myers, Rivas, & Jadin, 2009

Species of lizard

Anadia escalerae is a species of lizard in the family Gymnophthalmidae. It is known from the holotype collected from the La Escalera region in Venezuela and another specimen from the Pacaraima Mountains in Guyana.
