= Leptophobia micaia =

Scientific classification
- Kingdom: Animalia
- Phylum: Arthropoda
- Class: Insecta
- Order: Lepidoptera
- Family: Pieridae
- Genus: Leptophobia
- Species: L. micaia

Binomial name
- Leptophobia micaia Lamas, Pyrcz & Rodríguez, 2004

Species of butterfly

Leptophobia micaia is a butterfly in the family Pieridae. It is found in Colombia.
