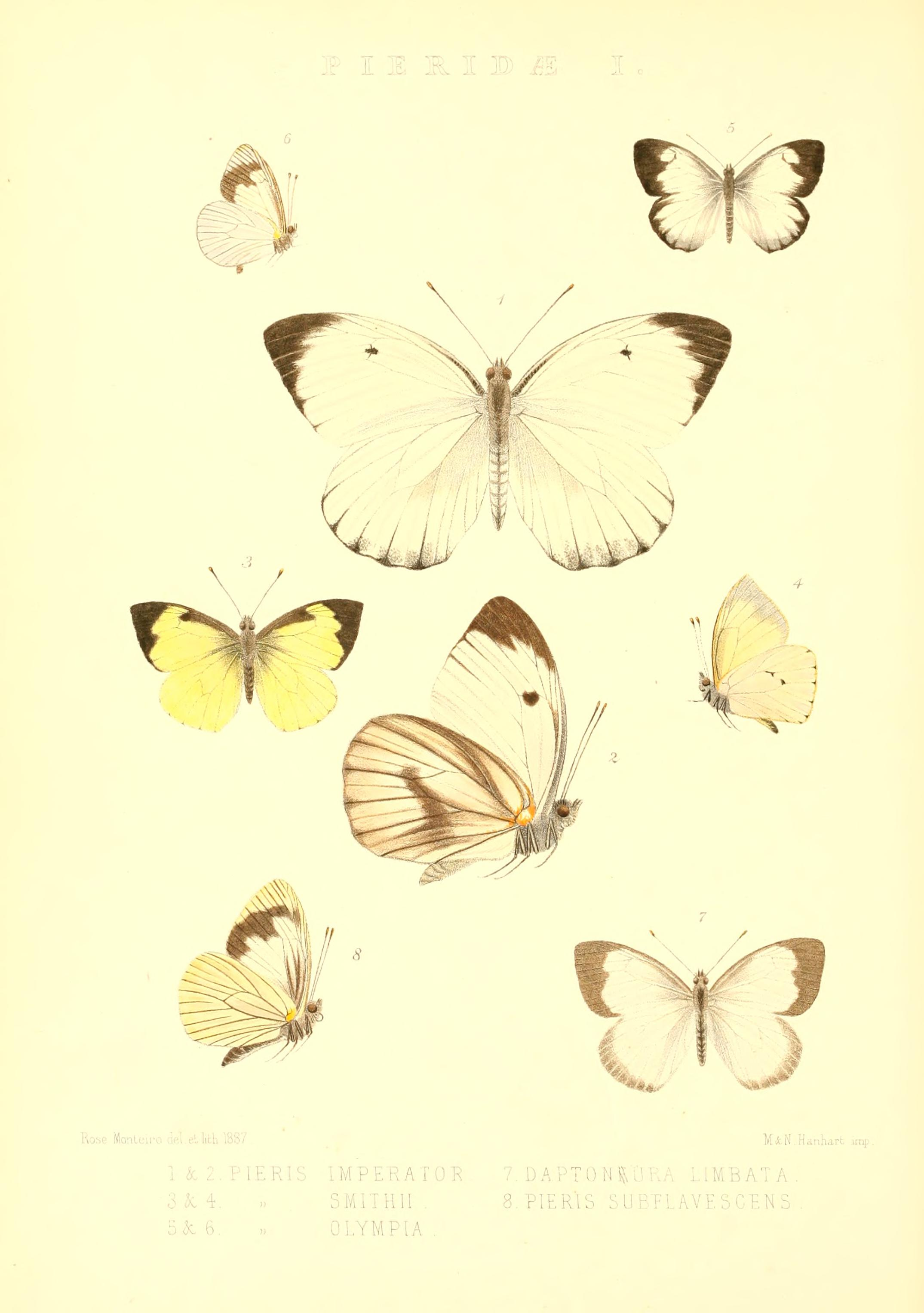
- Figures 5 and 6

Scientific classification
- Kingdom: Animalia
- Phylum: Arthropoda
- Class: Insecta
- Order: Lepidoptera
- Family: Pieridae
- Genus: Leptophobia
- Species: L. olympia

Binomial name
- Leptophobia olympia (C. & R. Felder, 1861)

Synonyms
- Pieris olympia C. & R. Felder, 1861; Leptophobia olympia potoniéi Baumann & Reissinger, 1969; Leptophobia olympia potoniei Baumann & Reissinger, 1969

= Leptophobia olympia =

Species of butterfly

Leptophobia olympia, the Olympia white, is a butterfly in the family Pieridae. It is found in Peru, Ecuador, Venezuela and Colombia.

The wingspan is 35–38 mm (1.4–1.5 in).

== Subspecies ==
The following subspecies are recognised:

- Leptophobia olympia olympia (Ecuador, Venezuela, Colombia)
- Leptophobia olympia potoniei Baumann & Reissinger, 1969 (Peru)
