= Anadia altaserrania =

Conservation status
- Least Concern (IUCN 3.1)

Scientific classification
- Kingdom: Animalia
- Phylum: Chordata
- Class: Reptilia
- Order: Squamata
- Family: Gymnophthalmidae
- Genus: Anadia
- Species: A. altaserrania

Binomial name
- Anadia altaserrania Harris & Ayala, 1987

Species of lizard

Anadia altaserrania is a species of lizard in the Gymnophthalmidae family. It is endemic to Sierra Nevada de Santa Marta, Colombia.
