= Leptophobia gonzaga =

Scientific classification
- Kingdom: Animalia
- Phylum: Arthropoda
- Class: Insecta
- Order: Lepidoptera
- Family: Pieridae
- Genus: Leptophobia
- Species: L. gonzaga

Binomial name
- Leptophobia gonzaga Fruhstorfer, 1908

Species of butterfly

Leptophobia gonzaga, the Gonzaga white, is a butterfly in the family Pieridae. It is found in Colombia and Ecuador.

The wingspan is about 34 mm (1.3 in).
