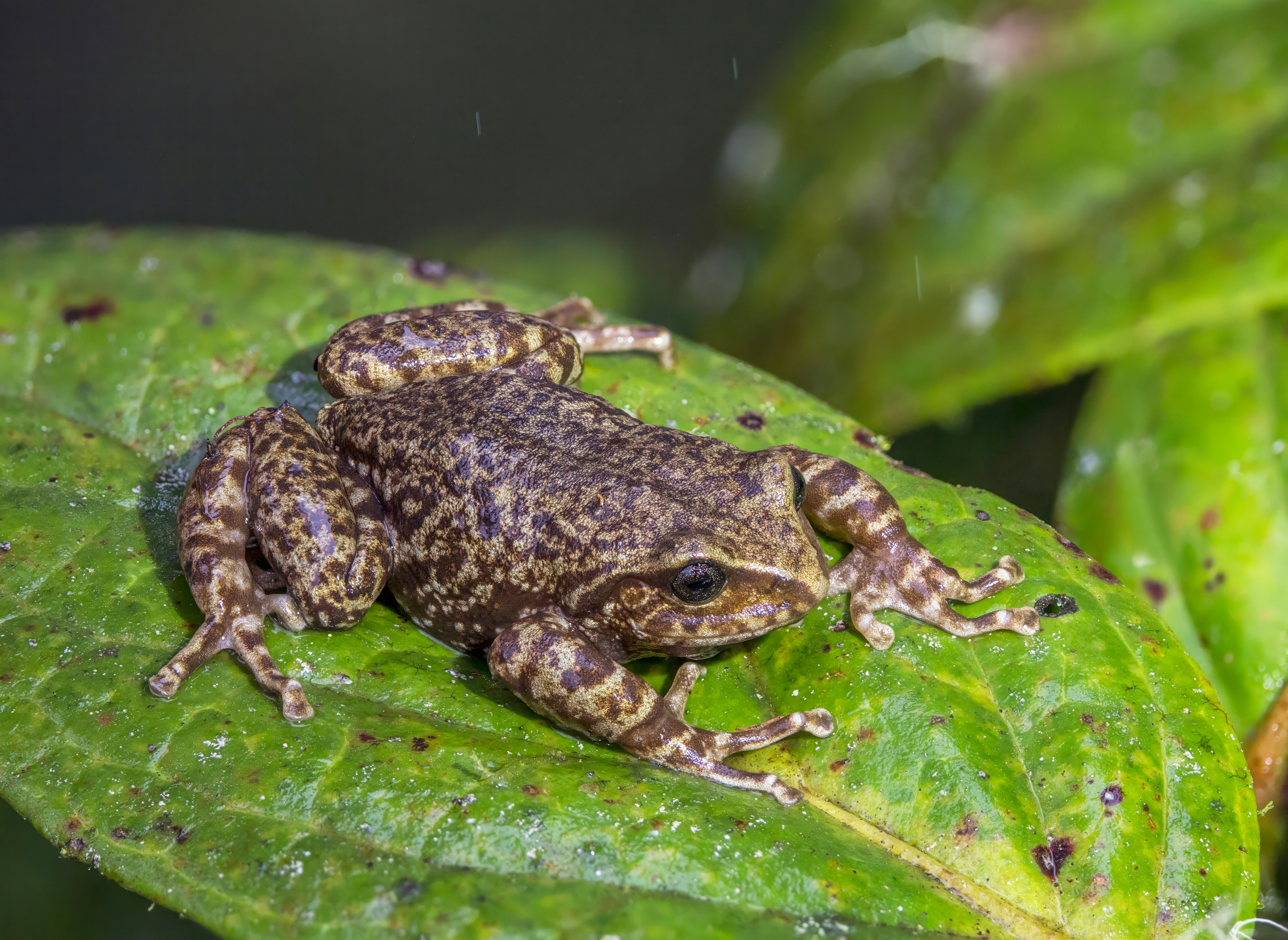

Conservation status
- Vulnerable (IUCN 3.1)

Scientific classification
- Kingdom: Animalia
- Phylum: Chordata
- Class: Amphibia
- Order: Anura
- Family: Strabomantidae
- Genus: Pristimantis
- Subgenus: Pristimantis
- Species: P. elegans

Binomial name
- Pristimantis elegans (Peters, 1863)

Synonyms
- Liuperus elegans Peters, 1863; Eleutherodactylus elegans (Peters, 1863); Hylodes Fuhrmanni Peracca, 1914

= Pristimantis elegans =

Species of frog

Pristimantis elegans is a species of frog in the family Strabomantidae. It is endemic to the Colombian Andes and occurs on the Cordillera Oriental in the Cundinamarca and Boyacá Departments. The common name elegant robber frog has been coined for it.

== Description ==
Pristimantis elegans is a stout-bodied frog. Calling males in the Chingaza National Natural Park measured 37–40 mm (1.5–1.6 in). The snout is rounded in dorsal view and truncate in profile. The eyes are large and prominent. The tympanum is distinct. The fingers are long and have lateral fringes. The toes are moderately long and have basal webbing.

The male advertisement call is pulsed, consisting of 2–7 notes, each with 3–7 pulses. The call duration is 0.4–2.7 seconds and the dominant frequency is around 1585 Hz.

== Habitat and conservation ==
Pristimantis elegans occurs in páramos and cloud forests at elevations of 2,600–3,650 m (8,530–11,980 ft) above sea level. It is typically found in herbaceous vegetation and very small bushes. Males mostly call at night, perched in vegetation. Development is direct, without free-living tadpole stage.

Pristimantis elegans is an abundant species but it is known from few localities. It is threatened by habitat loss and degradation caused by mining, agriculture, and cattle ranching. It is known from the Chingaza National Natural Park and Sumapaz National Park.
