= Anadia bogotensis =

Conservation status
- Near Threatened (IUCN 3.1)

Scientific classification
- Kingdom: Animalia
- Phylum: Chordata
- Class: Reptilia
- Order: Squamata
- Family: Gymnophthalmidae
- Genus: Anadia
- Species: A. bogotensis

Binomial name
- Anadia bogotensis (Peters, 1863)

Species of lizard

Bogotá Anadia (Anadia bogotensis) with a missing tail. An intact specimen would typically have a tail roughly the length of its body.

Anadia bogotensis, the Bogota anadia, is a species of lizard in the family Gymnophthalmidae. It is endemic to Colombia.
