= Anolis richteri =

Scientific classification
- Kingdom: Animalia
- Phylum: Chordata
- Class: Reptilia
- Order: Squamata
- Suborder: Iguania
- Family: Dactyloidae
- Genus: Anolis
- Species: A. richteri

Binomial name
- Anolis richteri Dunn, 1944

Species of lizard

Anolis richteri, the flat Andes anole, is a species of lizard in the family Dactyloidae. The species is found in Colombia.
