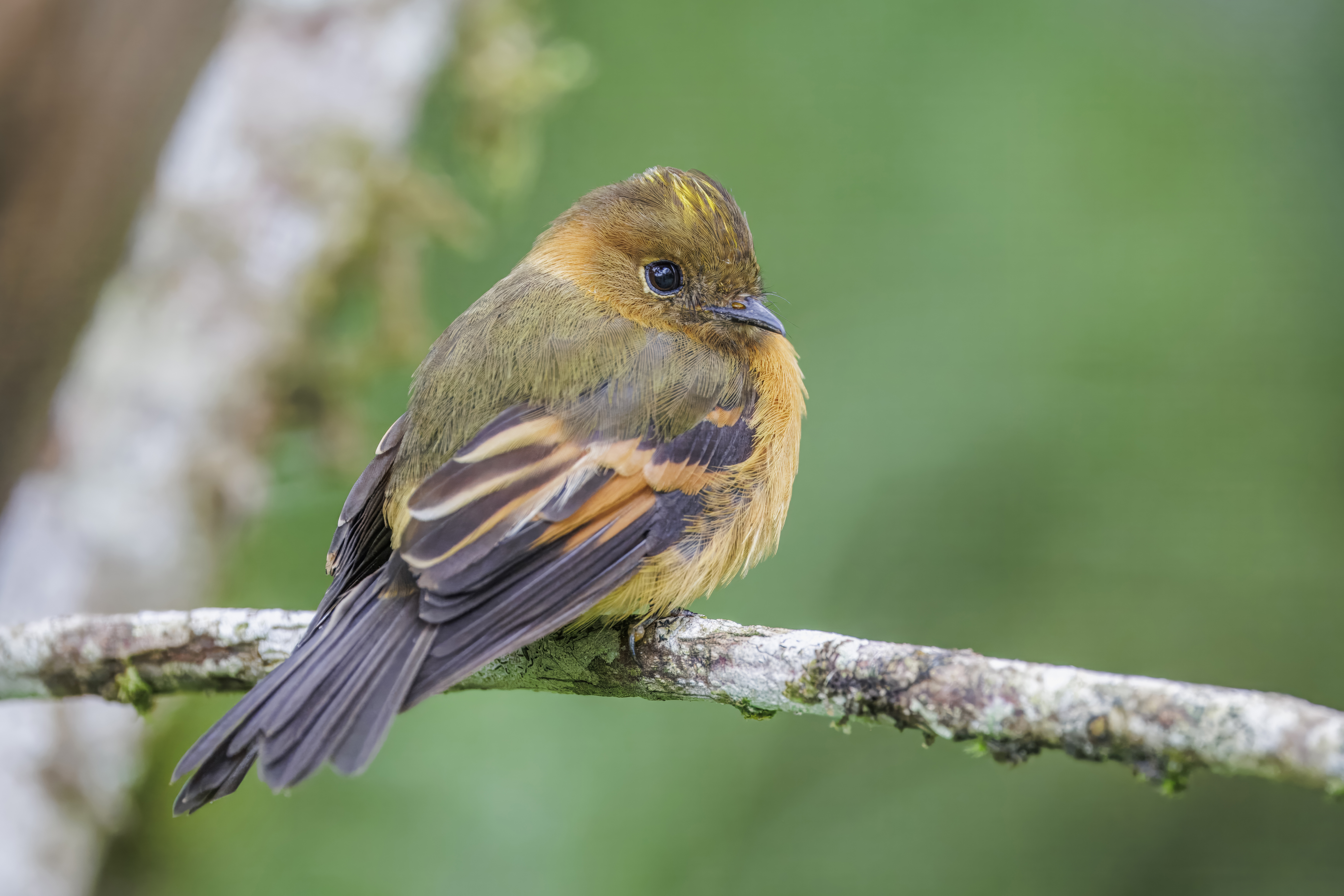

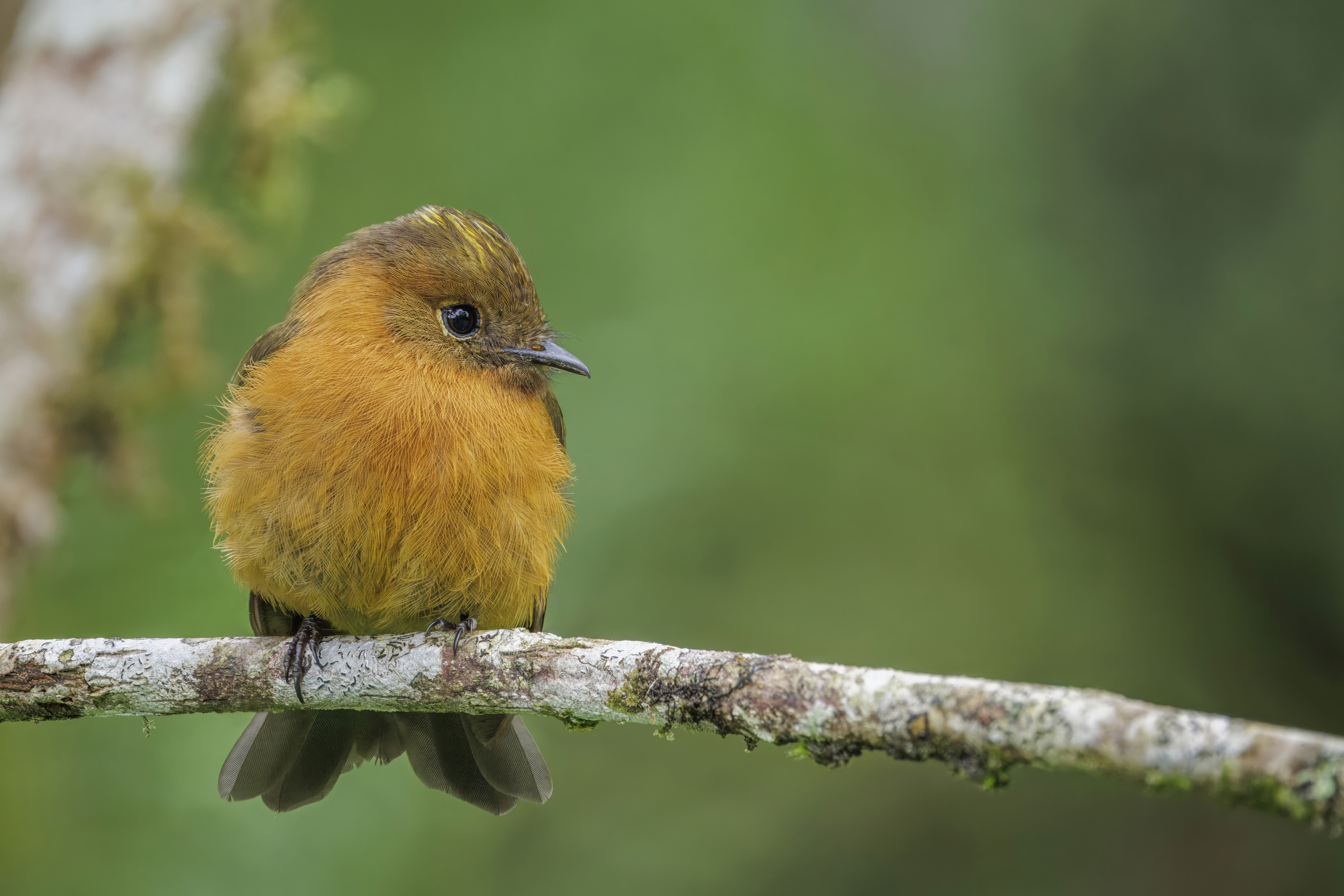
- P. c. pyrrhopterus, Quijos Canton, Ecuador

Conservation status
- Least Concern (IUCN 3.1)

Scientific classification
- Kingdom: Animalia
- Phylum: Chordata
- Class: Aves
- Order: Passeriformes
- Family: Tyrannidae
- Genus: Pyrrhomyias; Cabanis & Heine, 1860
- Species: P. cinnamomeus

Binomial name
- Pyrrhomyias cinnamomeus (D'Orbigny & Lafresnaye, 1837)

= Cinnamon flycatcher =

Species of bird

The cinnamon flycatcher (Pyrrhomyias cinnamomeus) is a species of bird in the family Tyrannidae, the tyrant flycatchers. It is native to the cloud forests of the Andes and other South American mountain ranges, and is found in Argentina, Bolivia, Colombia, Ecuador, Peru, and Venezuela.

== Taxonomy and systematics ==
The cinnamon flycatcher was originally described as Muscicapa cinnamomea, a member of the Old World flycatcher family Muscicapidae. In the mid-nineteenth century it was recognized as a tyrant flycatcher and moved to its current genus, where it is the only member.

The cinnamon flycatcher has these six subspecies:

- P. c. assimilis (Allen, JA, 1900)
- P. c. vieillotioides (Lafresnaye, 1848)
- P. c. spadix Wetmore, 1939
- P. c. pariae Phelps, WH & Phelps, WH Jr, 1949
- P. c. pyrrhopterus (Hartlaub, 1843)
- P. c. cinnamomeus (D'Orbigny & Lafresnaye, 1837)

The Clements taxonomy further sorts the subspecies into the Santa Marta group (assimilis), the Venezuelan group (vieillotioides, spadix, and pariae), and the Andean group (pyrrhopterus and cinnamomeus). Several of the subspecies were originally described as full species, and P. c. assimilis may warrant reconsideration as one.

== Description ==
The cinnamon flycatcher is 11 to 13 cm (4.3 to 5.1 in) long and weighs about 11 g (0.39 oz). The sexes have the same plumage. Adults of the nominate subspecies P. c. cinnamomeus have a dark brownish crown with a partially hidden yellow patch in the center. They have a faint buffy eye-ring and patch above the lores, olive-brown cheeks and nape, and cinnamon-rufous sides of the neck. Their upperparts are olive-brown with a thin, often hidden, cinnamon-orange band on the rump. Their wings are black with wide rufous edges on the flight feathers and wide rufous tips on the coverts that show as two wing bars. Their tail is blackish. Their throat and underparts are cinnamon-rufous; the belly is lighter than the rest. They have a dark iris, a wide black bill, and blackish legs and feet. Juveniles are browner than adults, with ochraceous tips on the lower back and tail feathers and without a crown patch.

The other subspecies of the cinnamon flycatcher differ from the nominate and each other thus:

- P. c. assimilis: reddish brown crown, orange-rufous back, thin olive band on upper rump above the orange-buff one, rufous tail feathers with dark brown band near the end, and more rufous on the flight feathers than the nominate
- P. c. vieillotioides: reddish-brown crown, rufescent-brown back that becomes olive on the upper rump, much rufous on the tail feathers, and slightly paler or duller breast than nominate
- P. c. spadix: reddish-brown crown, rufescent-brown back that becomes olive on the upper rump, much rufous on the tail feathers, and slightly paler or duller breast than nominate
- P. c. pariae: reddish-brown crown, rufescent-brown back that becomes olive on the upper rump, much rufous on the tail feathers, and slightly paler or duller breast than nominate
- P. c. pyrrhopterus: olive tinge on crown, olive back, and brighter orange-yellow rump band than nominate

== Distribution and habitat ==
The subspecies of the cinnamon flycatcher are found thus:

- P. c. assimilis: the isolated Sierra Nevada de Santa Marta in northern Colombia
- P. c. vieillotioides: Andes of Venezuela from northern Táchira to Lara and Venezuelan Coastal Range from Yaracuy and Carabobo to Miranda
- P. c. spadix: Venezuelan Coastal Range in Anzoátegui, western and southern Sucre, and northern Monagas
- P. c. pariae: cerros Humo and Azul on the Paria Peninsula in northeastern Venezuela
- P. c. pyrrhopterus: from Andes of southern Táchira in western Venezuela and Serranía del Perijá on the Venezuela-Colombia border south through the Colombian Andes, both slopes of the Ecuadoran Andes, and into Peru's Andes to Cajamarca Department on the western slope and San Martín Department on the eastern slope
- P. c. cinnamomeus: eastern slope of the Andes from San Martín Department in Peru south through Bolivia into northwestern Argentina as far as Tucumán Province

The cinnamon flycatcher inhabits foothill and montane forest in the subtropical and temperate zones. There it favors brushy clearings and edges both natural and along roads. In Colombia at least it often is found near rock faces. In elevation it ranges between 700 and 2,900 m (2,300 and 9,500 ft) in Venezuela, 1,500 and 3,000 m (4,900 and 9,800 ft) in Colombia, 1,200 and 3,000 m (3,900 and 9,800 ft) in Ecuador, and 900 and 3,400 m (3,000 and 11,200 ft) in Peru.

== Behavior ==
=== Movement ===
The cinnamon flycatcher is mostly a year-round resident but apparently vacates Argentina in the austral winter.

=== Feeding ===
The cinnamon flycatcher feeds on arthropods and also includes berries in its diet. It typically forages in pairs and joins mixed-species feeding flocks but does not follow them out of its territory. It typically perches on an exposed branch from near the ground up to about 15 m (50 ft) above it but not in treetops. It captures prey in mid-air with short sallies from the perch ("hawking") and usually returns to the same perch.

=== Breeding ===
The cinnamon flycatcher's breeding season has not been fully defined but includes April and May in northern Venezuela and December in Argentina. Its nest is an open cup made from moss and lichen. It is built in a rock crevice or niche, on a ledge, or in a fallen log or tree bark, and is typically between 1 and 5 m (3 and 16 ft) above the ground. The clutch is two eggs. The incubation period, time to fledging, and details of parental care are not known.

=== Vocalization ===
The cinnamon flycatcher does not have a dawn song. Its calls include a "dull, low-pitched...rattle, pti-i-i-i-i, spit out rather abruptly", a "stuttering pit, pti-pit-it", and "a few chip, tsip and pit notes". Another description of its main call is "a low-pitched dry rattling tr-r-r-r-r-r or dr-r-r-r-r-r".

== Status ==
The IUCN has assessed the cinnamon flycatcher as being of Least Concern. It has a very large range; its population size is not known and is believed to be stable. No immediate threats have been identified. It is considered common in Colombia and Venezuela, "generally numerous" in Ecuador, and "fairly common" in Peru. It occurs in protected areas throughout its range and "[s]eems fairly adaptable, and persists even in partially deforested regions".
