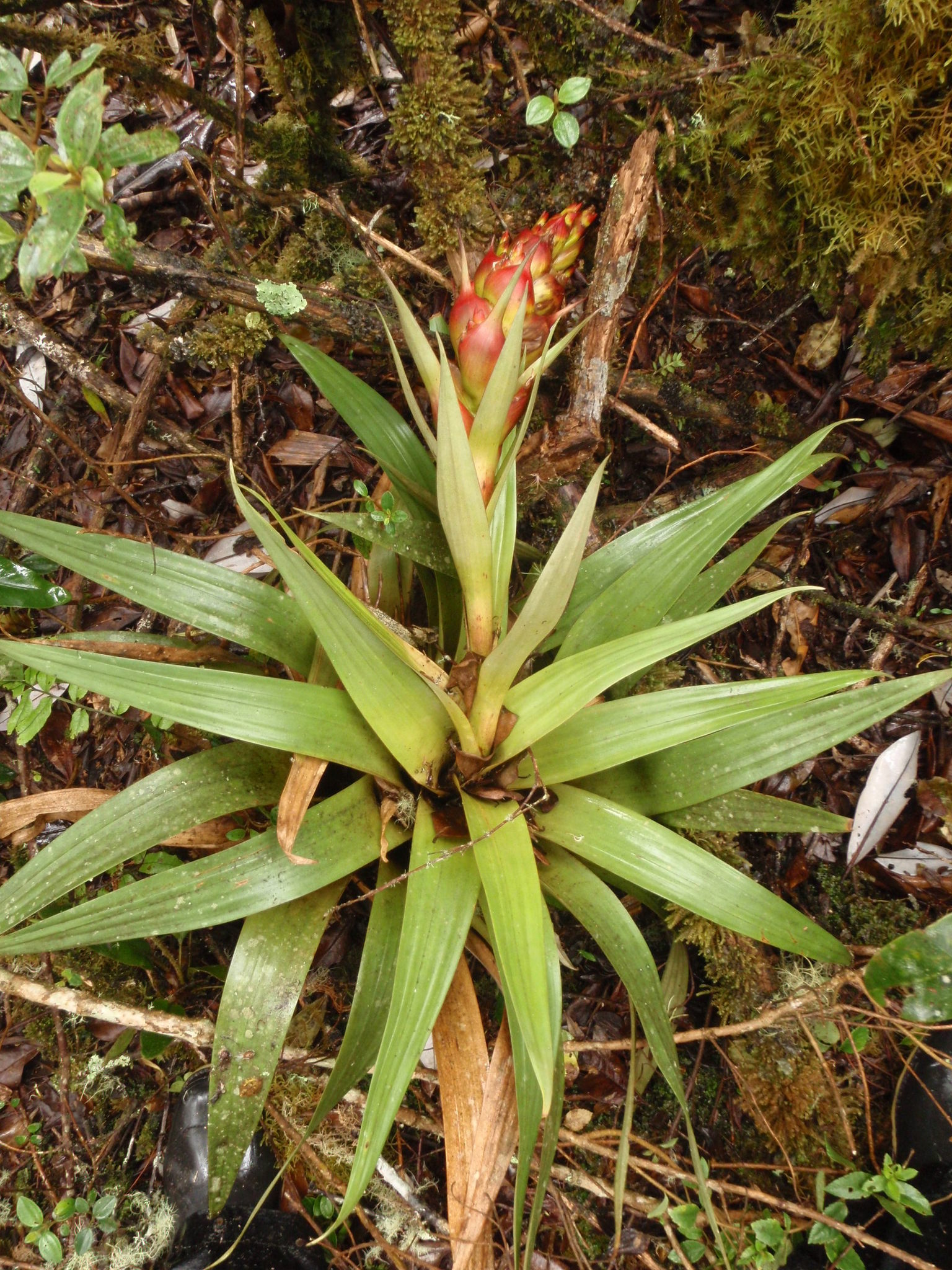

Scientific classification
- Kingdom: Plantae
- Clade: Tracheophytes
- Clade: Angiosperms
- Clade: Monocots
- Clade: Commelinids
- Order: Poales
- Family: Bromeliaceae
- Genus: Tillandsia
- Subgenus: Tillandsia subg. Tillandsia
- Species: T. turneri

Binomial name
- Tillandsia turneri Baker

Synonyms
- Tillandsia rhodocincta Baker; Tillandsia multifolia Mez; Tillandsia cornuaulti André; Guzmania cornuaulti (André) André ex Mez; Tillandsia archeri L.B.Sm.; Thecophyllum cornuaulti (André) Mez

= Tillandsia turneri =

Species of plant

Tillandsia turneri is a species of flowering plant in the family Bromeliaceae. This species is native to Venezuela, Colombia, Guyana, and northern Brazil.

Three varieties are recognized:

1. Tillandsia turneri var. orientalis L.B.Sm. – southern Venezuela, Guyana, northern Brazil
2. Tillandsia turneri var. patens L.B.Sm. – northwestern Venezuela
3. Tillandsia turneri var. turneri – Colombia, northwestern Venezuela
