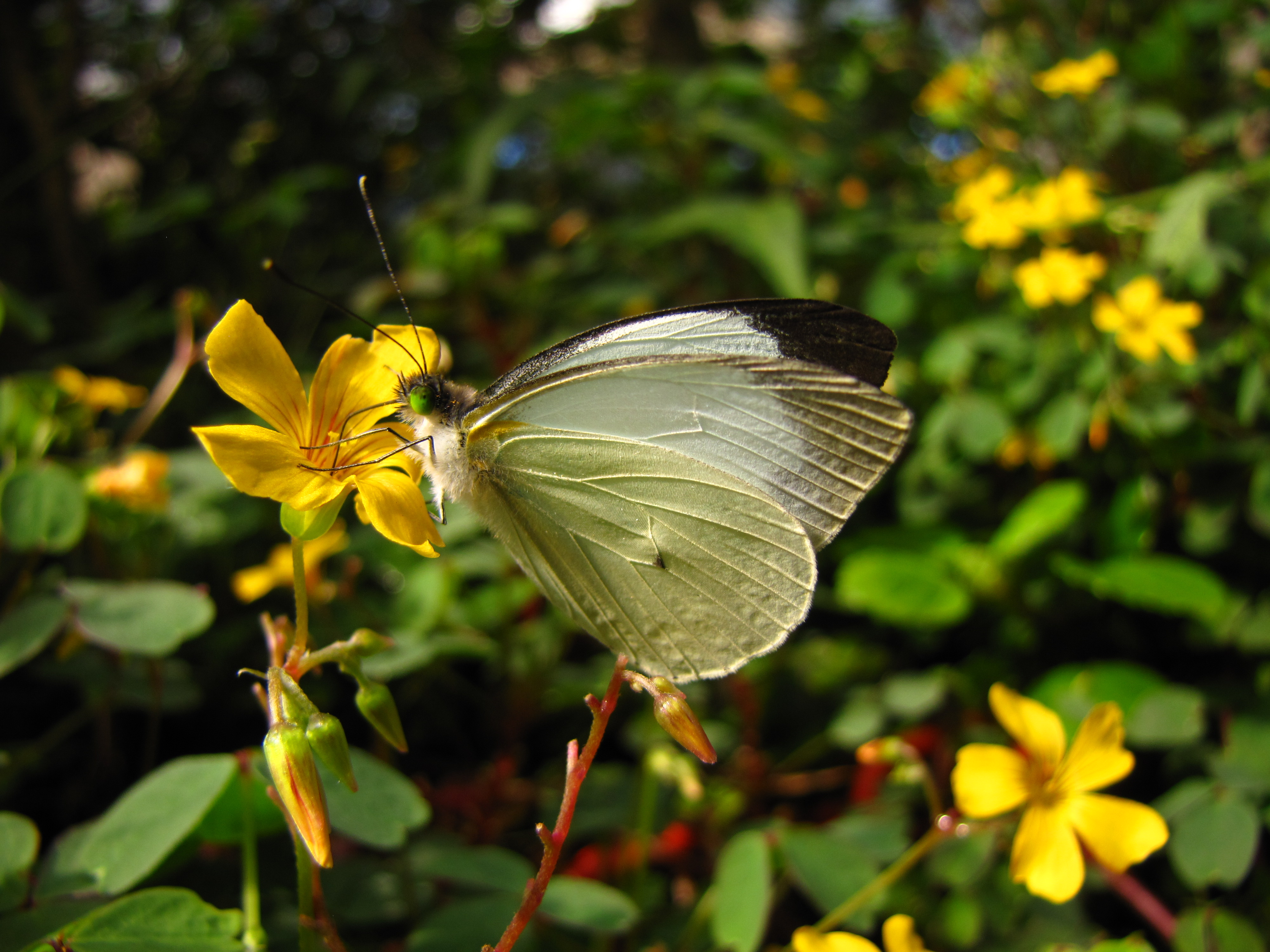
- Common green-eyed white from Brazil

Scientific classification
- Kingdom: Animalia
- Phylum: Arthropoda
- Class: Insecta
- Order: Lepidoptera
- Family: Pieridae
- Genus: Leptophobia
- Species: L. aripa

Binomial name
- Leptophobia aripa (Boisduval, 1836)

Synonyms
- Pieris aripa Boisduval, 1836; Daptonura limbata Kirby, 1887; Leptophobia aripa elodia f. deserta Fruhstorfer, 1908; Pieris elodia Boisduval, 1836; Pieris pylotis f. impunctata Breyer, 1939

= Leptophobia aripa =

Species of butterfly

Leptophobia aripa, the common green-eyed white or mountain white, is a butterfly in the family Pieridae. It is native to Mexico, Central America and South America, but strays may be found as far north as southern Texas. Leptophobia aria is very selective of the host they choose to lay their eggs in. It is a multivoltine species with overlapping generations. Adults feed on flower nectar of various species, including Emilia sonchifolia, Lantana camara and Bidens pilosa.

The larvae feed on Brassicaceae species, including Brassica oleracea. Other records include Nasturtium officinale, Tovaria pendula and Tropaeolum moritzianum.

== Subspecies ==
The following subspecies are recognised:

- Leptophobia aripa aripa (Venezuela, Ecuador)
- Leptophobia aripa balidia (Boisduval, 1836) (Brazil)
- Leptophobia aripa elodia (Boisduval, 1836) (Mexico, Bolivia, Ecuador)
- Leptophobia aripa elodina (Röber, 1908) (Bolivia, Argentina)
