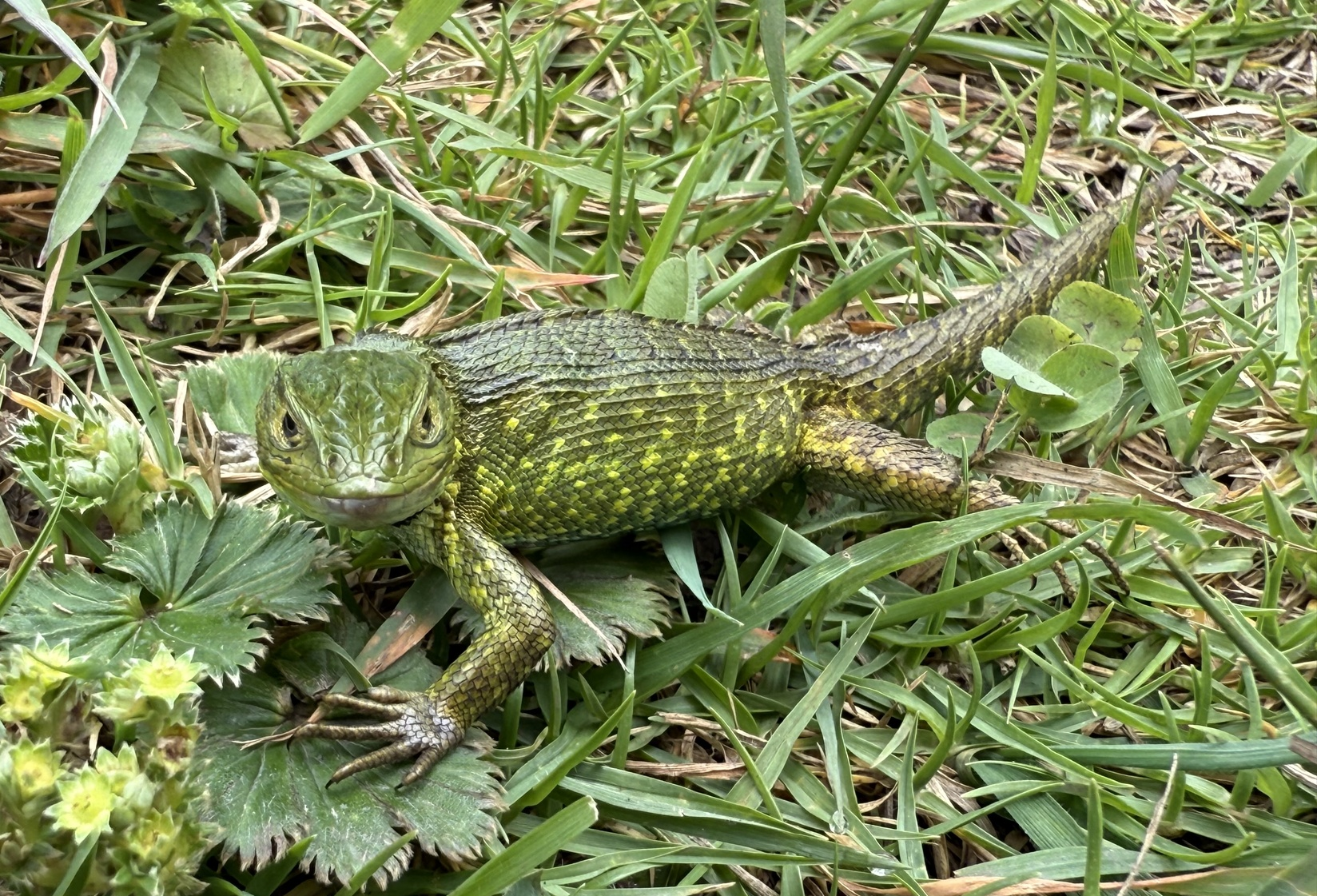
- Stenocercus trachycephalus

Conservation status
- Least Concern (IUCN 3.1)

Scientific classification
- Kingdom: Animalia
- Phylum: Chordata
- Class: Reptilia
- Order: Squamata
- Suborder: Iguania
- Family: Tropiduridae
- Genus: Stenocercus
- Species: S. trachycephalus

Binomial name
- Stenocercus trachycephalus (Duméril, 1851)

= Stenocercus trachycephalus =

Species of lizard

Stenocercus trachycephalus, Duméril's whorltail iguana, is a species of lizard of the family Tropiduridae. It is found in Colombia.
