= C. carvalhoi =

C. carvalhoi may refer to:

- Chiasmocleis carvalhoi, a frog species endemic to Brazil
- Colobosauroides carvalhoi, a lizard species in the genus Colobosauroides
- Cycloramphus carvalhoi, a frog species endemic to Brazil

== See also ==
- Carvalhoi (disambiguation)
