= Carvalhoi =

Carvalhoi may refer to:

- Aechmea carvalhoi, a Bromeliaceae species endemic to Brazil
- Amphisbaena carvalhoi, a worm lizard species found in Brazil
- Bokermannohyla carvalhoi, a species of frog in the family Hylidae, endemic to Brazil
- Chiasmocleis carvalhoi, a frog species endemic to Brazil
- Colobosauroides carvalhoi, a lizard species in the genus Colobosauroides
- Cycloramphus carvalhoi, a frog species endemic to Brazil
- Dendrophryniscus carvalhoi, a toad species endemic to Brazil
- Diplopterys carvalhoi, a plant species in the genus Diplopterys
- Harttia carvalhoi, a species of armored catfish endemic to Brazil where it is found in the Paquequer River basin
- Odontophrynus carvalhoi, a species of frog in the family Leptodactylidae, endemic to Brazil
- Pipa carvalhoi, the Carvalho's Surinam toad, a frog species endemic to Brazil
- Pristimantis carvalhoi, an amphibian species in the genus Pristimantis found in Brazil
- Syncope carvalhoi, a species of frog in the family Microhylidae, found in Colombia, Peru, and possibly Brazil
- Wittmackia carvalhoi, a species in the genus Wittmackia, endemic to Brazil
- Zachaenus carvalhoi, a species of frog in the family Leptodactylidae, endemic to Brazil

== See also ==
- Carvalho
