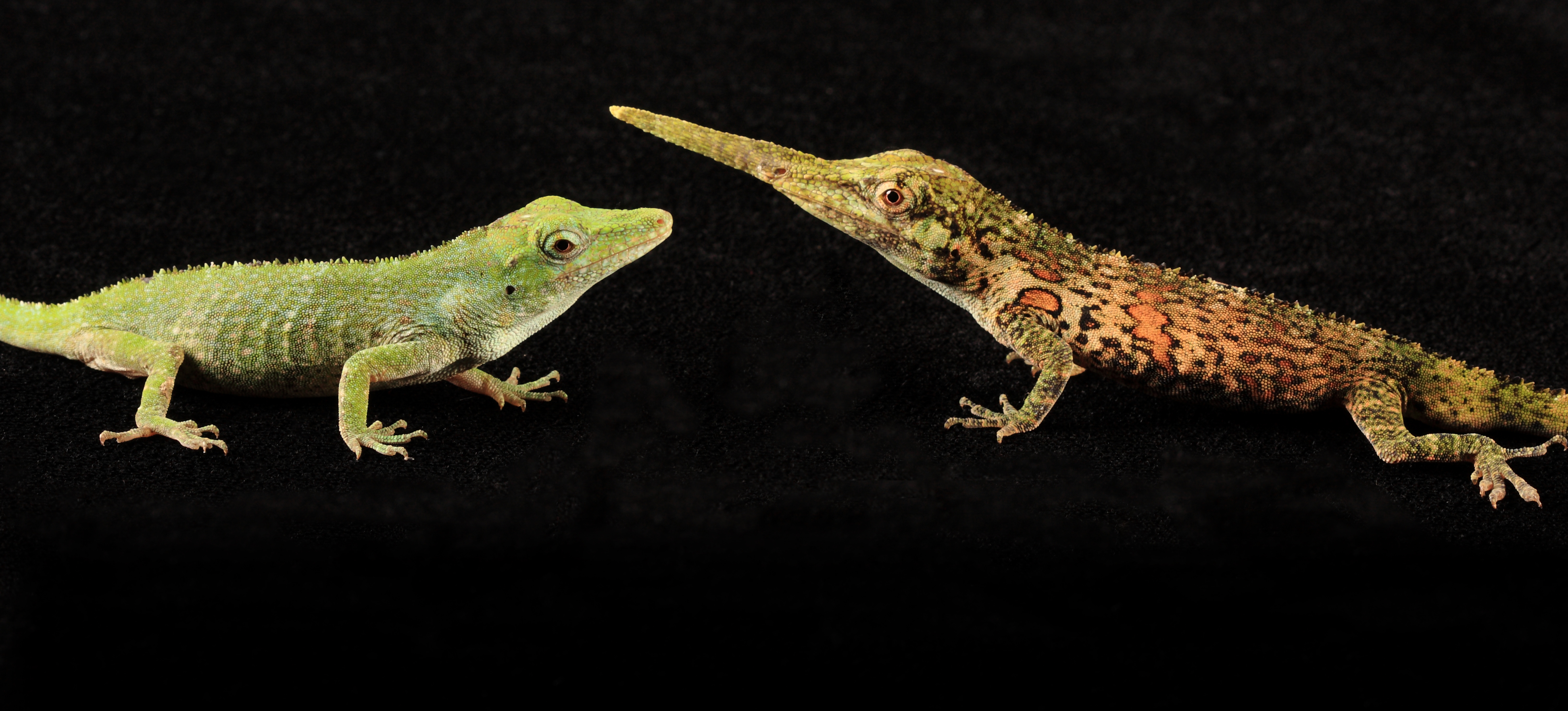
- Female (left) and male (right)

Conservation status
- Endangered (IUCN 3.1)

Scientific classification
- Kingdom: Animalia
- Phylum: Chordata
- Class: Reptilia
- Order: Squamata
- Suborder: Iguania
- Family: Dactyloidae
- Genus: Anolis
- Species: A. proboscis

Binomial name
- Anolis proboscis Peters & Orces, 1956

= Anolis proboscis =

Species of lizard

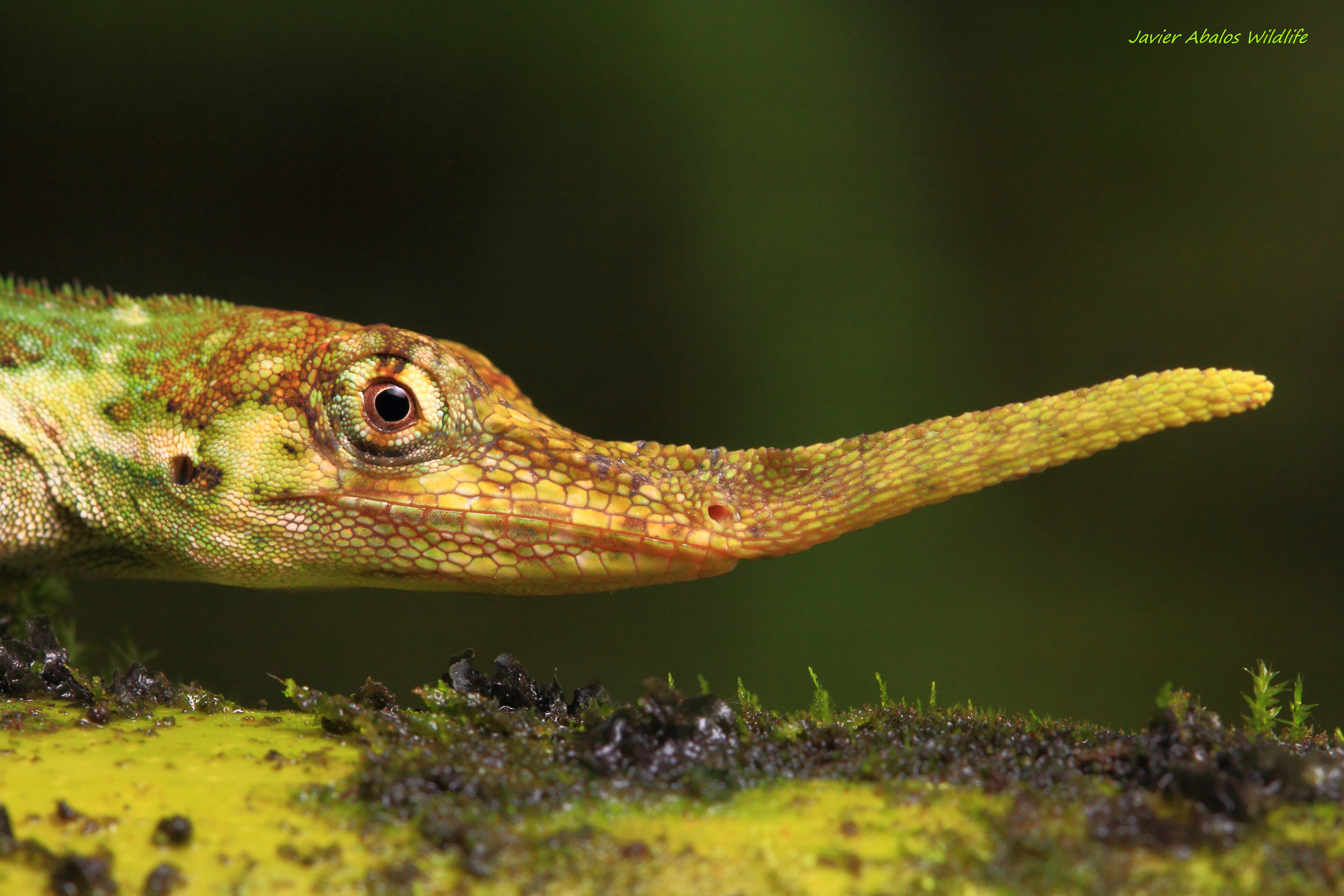
A close-up of a male specimen.

Anolis proboscis, commonly known as the horned anole, Ecuadorian horned anole or Pinocchio lizard, is a small anole lizard in the family Dactyloidae. A single male specimen was discovered in 1953 in Ecuador and formally described by Peters and Orces in 1956, but the species then went unreported until its rediscovery in 2004. Its currently known habitat is a small stretch of vegetation along an Ecuadorian highway. It has been classified as Endangered by the IUCN due to its restricted distribution and ongoing habitat loss.

== Description ==
Anolis proboscis has very short limbs and a small body. Four main movement behaviors have been observed: crawling (most common), walking, running, and jumping.

Anolis proboscis has a total body length (excluding tail) of roughly 5–7.5 cm (2.0–3.0 in). Males, which are slightly larger than females, possess a conspicuous proboscis, an elongated structure arising from the middle of the snout and about 1–2 cm (0.4–0.8 in) in length; it appears to be used in courtship displays, as is the dewlap that is present in both sexes. There are multiple colour morphs, with the proboscis ranging from greenish yellow to orange-brown, and variety of patterning over the body, including spots and stripes. Anolis proboscis bears many resemblances to the Greater Antillean twig anoles, both morphologically, with comparable sexual dimorphism, a slender body, short legs and tail, and in a behavioral sense, residing almost exclusively on narrow surfaces. As such, the species can be classified as a member of the twig ecomorph among anoles. The species possesses a semi-prehensile tail, which aids them as they climb and forage in the canopy. Although slow moving, they have been known to cover great distances. The species differs from similar species in the region in its comparatively small, whitish dewlap, and a row of enlarged scales that run along the dorsum.

=== Proboscis ===
One of the most notable features of the species is its proboscis - a pliable, blunt appendage extending beyond the snout approximately 85% of the head length. Although the exact purpose of the appendage is unknown, male-male combat can be ruled out due to its highly flexible nature. Beyond sexual selection, the proboscis may help males appear larger, which could lend a significant advantage in male to male interactions, despite not acting as an actual weapon. Finally, because of its sexually dimorphic nature, the proboscis' use in thermoregulation or as a lure for hunting prey can also be ruled out. Because the dewlap of A. proboscis is comparatively underdeveloped compared to other anole species - it is far smaller and less colorful - the appendage could compensate and act as an ornament, as it is prominently displayed during mating rituals. Likely, it serves as an intraspecific communication signal, and could also play a role in territorial displays as a way for males to assert dominance over each other or in mate choice.

== Distribution and habitat ==
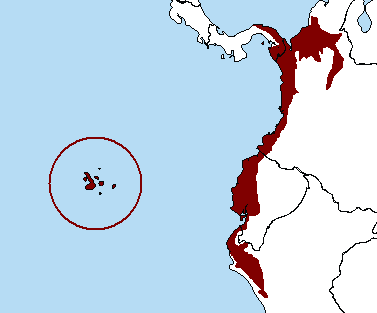
The Tumbes-Chocó-Magdalena region of Panama, Colombia, Ecuador, and Peru (from top to bottom).

Based on the few localities known, the species inhabits montane forest habitats in the Chocó, where it keeps to high trees. Specimens have predominantly been found in primary and secondary vegetation along a well-traveled dirt road. Only five localities in total are currently known, with a maximum distance of 13 km (8 mi) between the two farthest ones. While the area of occurrence includes pasture land and secondary forest, it is likely that the species also lives in other mid-altitude (1,200–1,650 m or 3,940–5,410 ft) areas in the Ecuadorian Andes. Despite most sightings of them occurring in areas with severe habitat fragmentation and destruction, it can be concluded that they prefer the deep forest where they are far more difficult to spot. The species has been known to occupy all levels of the rainforest, ranging from the groundfloor to the canopy. However, they seem to spend most of their time high off the ground, inhabiting dense vegetation, making them particularly difficult to observe. At night, the lizards roost on small twigs and leaves (less than a centimeter in diameter) between 2.1 and 10 meters off of the ground, which allow them to detect the vibrations of potential predators. Observations in the Mindo area of Ecuador located the species in apple trees and bamboo plants, as well as in disturbed forest habitats.

== Conservation ==
The species is currently classified as Endangered due to its possibly restricted distribution in combination with ongoing threats in the form of habitat loss from logging, human settlement, agriculture, and grazing. Further, because of the species' rarity and unique appearance, it is at risk of poaching for the international pet trade.

The species was feared to be extinct when it was not seen after the original collection in 1953. It was rediscovered in 2004 when an individual was seen and photographed in a cloud forest near Mindo, Ecuador, by a visiting ornithologist. In August 2009, a herpetology expedition from the University of New Mexico located the species in a remote region of Ecuador. In total, they found five individuals including three males and the first two females ever seen and collected. Since 2009, several other expeditions were able to relocate the species in remote regions of Ecuador. However, Anolis proboscis' rarity could be the result of several different factors, including a very niche environment (the canopies of cloud forests), and naturally low populations.

== Speciation ==
Among anoles, only three species have a proboscis, the other being the poorly known and rarely seen Amazonian A. laevis and A. phyllorhinus. Despite this similarity and the historical inclusion of all three in the laevis group, A. phyllorhinus does not appear to be closely related to the two others. A. phyllorhinus has a comparatively longer tail and limbs, is green in color, and is not a twig specialist, like A. proboscis. However, these differences do not necessarily suggest a distant relationship, as Anoles are well known for their ecomorphological diversity. Thus, it is likely that the proboscis is not tied to a specific specialization of anole. However, they do appear to be close relatives and part of the Phenacosaurus group. The proboscis is likely the result of convergent evolution.

== Diet ==
The species is omnivorous and has a diverse diet. The stomach can hold anywhere between 4-16 prey items. A large array of different insects is preyed on, with the primary sources of food including caterpillars, coleopterans (beetles), hemipterans (bugs), dipterans (flies), and hymenoptera (bees and wasps). However, this species also eats pseudoscorpions, larvae, millipedes, spiders, and assorted plant material including flower petals, pieces of wood, and seeds.

== Mating ==
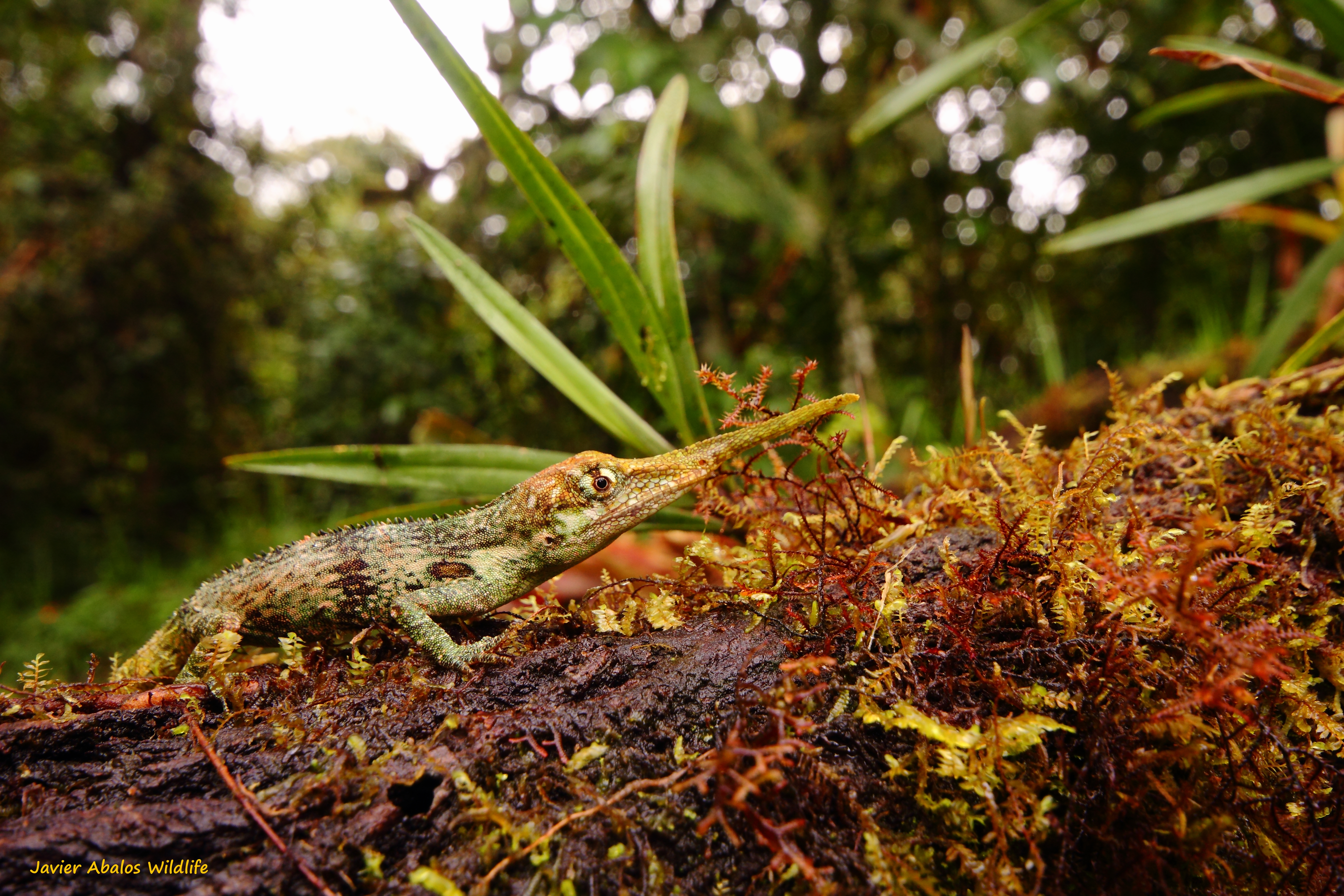
Male

A number of different behaviours connected to mating behaviour have been recorded. Initially it was assumed that the proboscis played a role in reproduction, but this has not been confirmed. A. proboscis follows a polygynous mating system, with a wide variety of visual cues and movements involved in the entirety of the process.

=== Courtship ===
In order to attract a mate both males and females display their dewlaps, employing variations of extension lengths. Males have been seen with their dewlaps extended and their proboscis drooped downward while courting. Males are able to slowly change the stiffness and direction of their horns when courting. Other courting behaviors that have been observed include swinging of the head from side to side, known as "proboscis flourishing", and up and down when approaching a female all while the dewlap is displayed, either half or fully extended. Courtship is deemed successful if and when the females runs past the male and continues in the opposite direction which leads to the second stage of mating called chasing. The female may perform a push-up with her forelimbs along with a head-bob and extension of her dewlap in response to the male's courting.

Chasing progresses when the female prompts the male to follow by running past him in the opposite direction. It involves the male following the female in quick short sprints one to three steps long while frequently bobbing their heads in the same pattern as seen in courtship. Chasing ends with the female arching her neck, or when the male begins to climb on her tail with his forelimbs. If the male cannot successfully follow the female, no mating occurs. Similar behavior has been observed in A. carolinensis, suggesting that is a challenge issued by the female as test for the male before mating can begin.

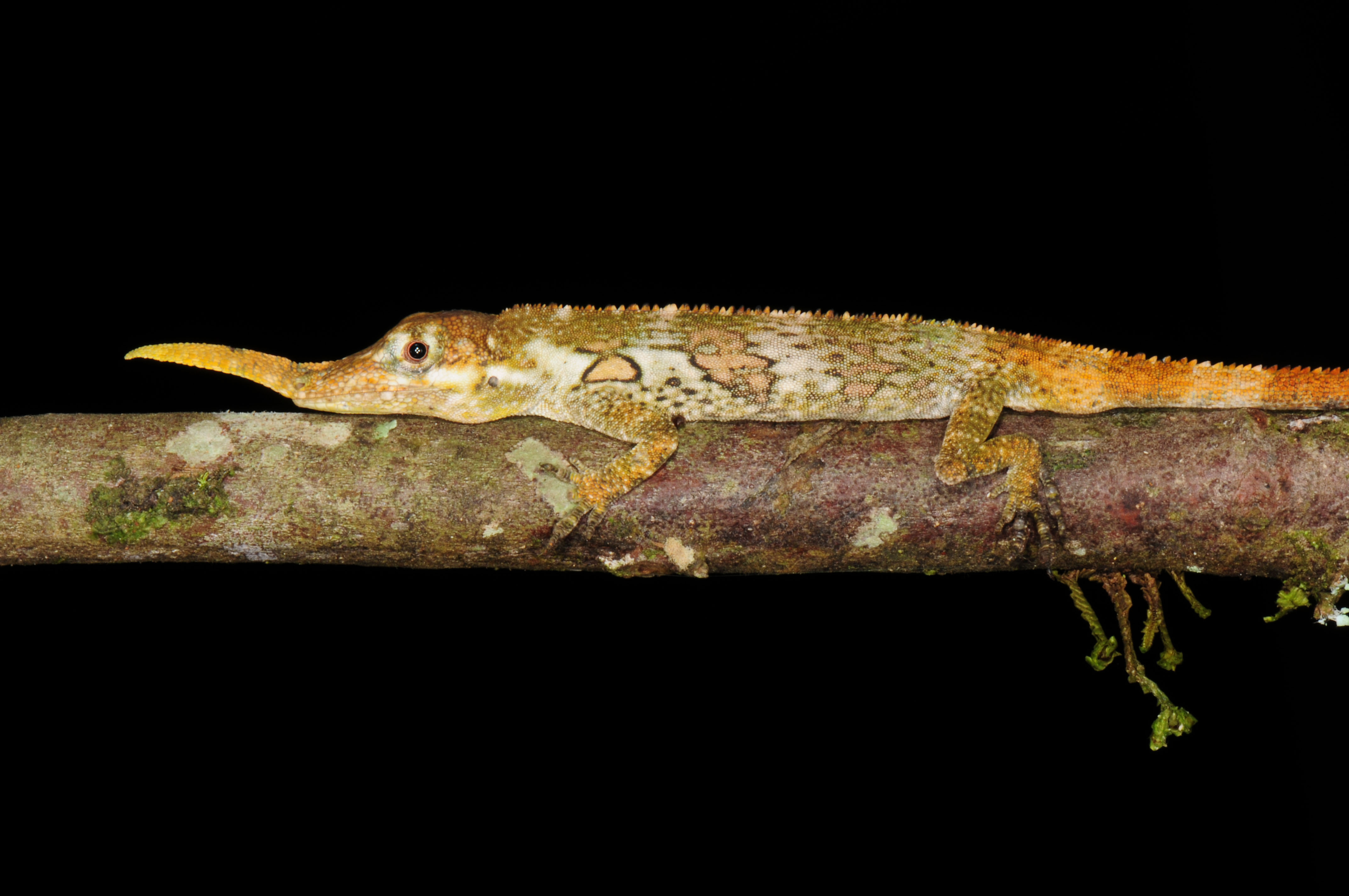
Male

Next, the stimulation stage begins when the male catches the female and the female arches her neck in response, signifying readiness for copulation. The male must mount the female and find a good position to copulate in. As the male does this, he is constantly rubbing her nape with the tip of his snout in order to stimulate the female and to elevate the female's rostral appendage. Males have also been observed biting the female on the nape, which then stopped after copulation.

=== Copulation ===
The copulation stage begins after the male and female have found an appropriate position together. Once this happens the male inserts one of his hemipenes into her cloaca. There is no specific time length for copulation but mating ends when the male and female have separated. There are a variety of displays by the male that may occur after copulation, including head bobbing, extension of the dewlap, which the female may or may not respond to.

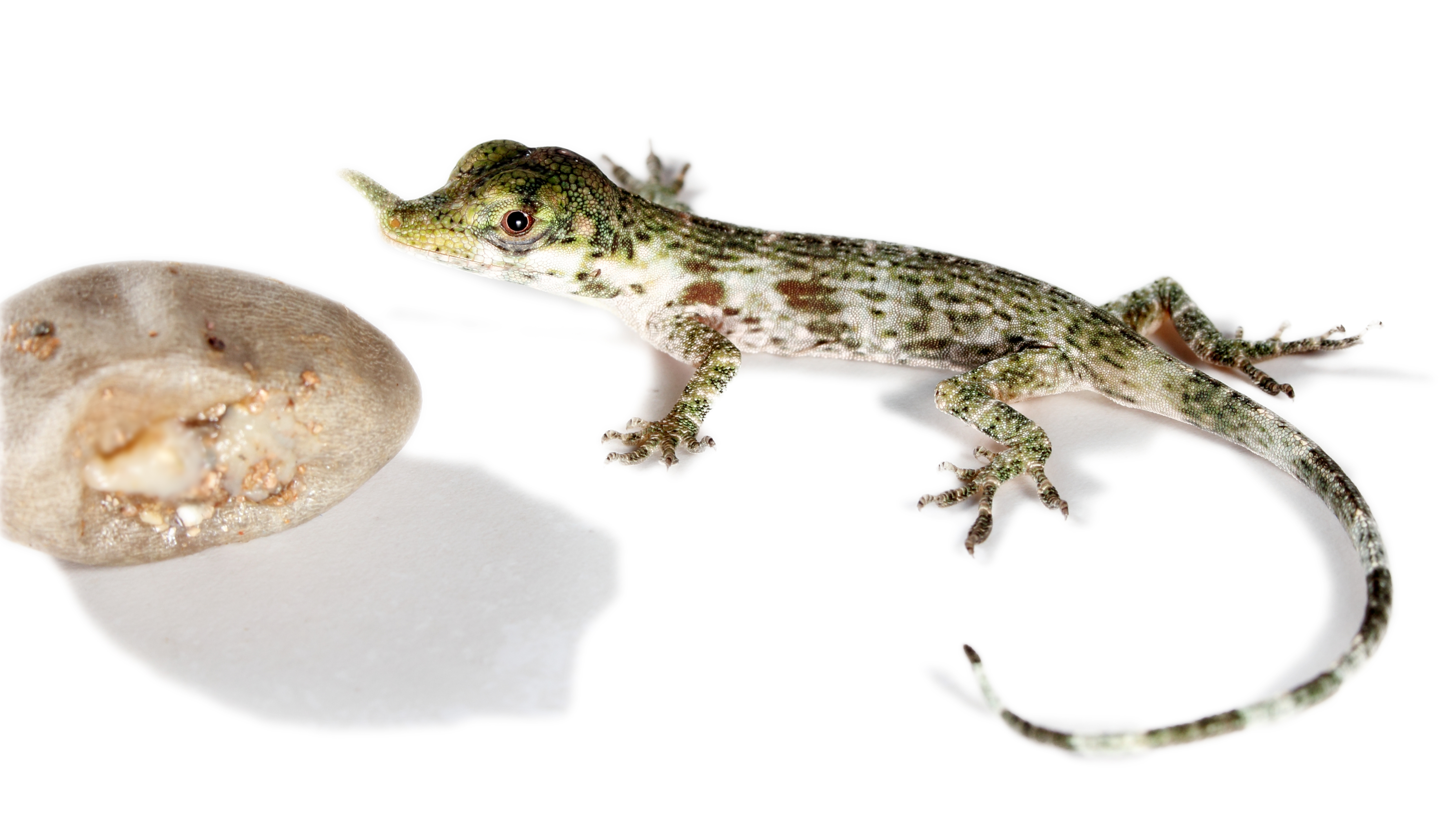
Hatchling.

=== Reproduction ===
Anolis proboscis reproduces oviparously. In captivity, females lay a single egg, which is incubated for roughly 165 days (5.5 months). Males are born with a proboscis already formed, which lengthens as they develop.

=== Conflict between males ===
Male agonistic behaviors can occur when two males attempt to court the same female. Non-violent agonistic behaviors from males include attempts to display at each other, chase the other male away, open their mouths to display teeth, arch their neck, raise their backs and probosces, and keep their heads down. They may also bring their rostral appendages against each other's faces, touching the opposing male with the tip or their snout, or perform slow tail undulations. Further, the males have been observed performing a movement resembling a push-up, whereby he moves his body forward with his head and tail down, and then back, raising his head and tail in the process. During this display, the male's dewlaps will be extended, the tail curled up, and the proboscis straight. These behaviors are intended to scare away the other males, potentially by making the male appear larger. They have also been recorded turning sideways and straightening out their body, extending their tongues, perhaps to accentuate their body length. Violent agonistic behaviors can include biting and pushing of other males. Agonistic behaviors can last as long as it takes for the other male to stop attempting courtship. Unlike many other reptile species with prominent proboscises, A. proboscis does not use the appendage as a weapon, and may even attempt to protect it when fighting. During violent male-male interactions, the proboscis remains lifted, and some specimens bear scars, suggesting the appendage can be injured. In general, the species appears to be less aggressive than other kinds of anoles, which falls in line with the behavior of other twig ecomorphs. Unlike species like A. marcanoi or A. carolinensis, there are far fewer attempts at biting or "jaw locking" during male-male conflict.
