= D. carvalhoi =

D. carvalhoi may refer to:

- Dendrophryniscus carvalhoi, a toad species endemic to Brazil
- Diplopterys carvalhoi, a plant species in the genus Diplopterys

== See also ==
- Carvalhoi (disambiguation)
