= Bahia frog =

Bahia frog may refer to:

- Bahia forest frog (Macrogenioglottus alipioi), a frog in the family Odontophrynidae endemic to the Atlantic Forest of southeastern Brazil
- Bahia heart-tongued frog (Phyllodytes melanomystax), a frog in the family Hylidae endemic to Brazil
- Bahia lime tree frog (Sphaenorhynchus bromelicola), a frog in the family Hylidae endemic to Bahia, Brazil
- Bahia snouted tree frog (Scinax strigilatus), a frog in the family Hylidae endemic to Brazil
- Bahia yellow frog (Stereocyclops histrio) a frog in the family Microhylidae endemic to the Atlantic forest in Bahia, Brazil
