= Antenor Leitão de Carvalho =

Brazilian herpetologist

- Born: April 15, 1910; Barreira do Piquete
- Died: December 11, 1985 (aged 75); Rio de Janeiro
- Scientific career
- Fields: Herpetology, ichthyology
- Author abbrev. (zoology): Carvalho

Antenor Leitão de Carvalho was a Brazilian herpetologist and ichthyologist, born on 15 April 1910 and died on 11 December 1985 in Rio de Janeiro.

== Taxa named in his honor ==
- Hypostomus carvalhoi (A. Miranda-Ribeiro, 1937) is a species of catfish in the family Loricariidae. It is native to South America, where it occurs in the Jaguaribe River basin.
- Pipa carvalhoi (A. Miranda-Ribeiro, 1937)
- Plecostomus carvalhoi A. Miranda-Ribeiro, 1937
- Discocystus carvalhoi Mello-Leitão, 1941
- Bunocephalus carvalhoi A. Miranda-Ribeiro, 1944
- Mecynogea carvalhoi Mello-Leitão, 1944
- Micrathena carvalhoi Mello-Leitão, 1944
- Carvalhodesmus Schubart, 1945
- Stenostreptus carvalhoi Schubart, 1945
- Tityus carvalhoi Mello-Leitão, 1945
- Arndtodesmus carvalhoi Schubart, 1947
- Cynolebias carvalhoi G. Myers, 1947
- Cynolebias antenori G. Myers, 1952
- Harttia carvalhoi P. Miranda-Ribeiro, 1939 – a species of catfish
- Icthyocephalus antenori Travassos & Kloss, 1959
- Amphisbaena carvalhoi Gans, 1965
- Odontophrynus carvalhoi Savage & Cei, 1965
- Micrurus lemniscatus carvalhoi Roze, 1967
- Syncope antenori (Walker, 1973)
- Syncope carvalhoi Nelson, 1975
- Bokermannohyla carvalhoi (Peixoto, 1981)
- Zachaenus carvalhoi Izecksohn, 1983
- Panopa carvalhoi Rebouças & Vanzolini, 1990
- Dendrophryniscus carvalhoi Izecksohn, 1994
- Colobosauroides carvalhoi Soares & Caramaschi, 1998

== Taxa described ==
- Arcovomer Carvalho, 1954
- Arcovomer passarellii Carvalho, 1954
- Hamptophryne Carvalho, 1954
- Hyophryne Carvalho, 1954
- Hyophryne histrio Carvalho, 1954
- Macrogenioglottus alipioi Carvalho, 1946
- Macrogenioglottus Carvalho, 1946
- Myersiella Carvalho, 1954
- Paratelmatobius Lutz & Carvalho, 1958
- Paratelmatobius lutzii Lutz & Carvalho, 1958
- Relictivomer Carvalho, 1954
- Rhinella dapsilis (G. Myers & Carvalho, 1945)
- Rhinella pygmaea (G. Myers & Carvalho, 1952)
- Synapturanus Carvalho, 1954
- Anolis phyllorhinus G. Myers & Carvalho, 1945
- Siagonodon cupinensis Bailey & Carvalho, 1946

== See also ==
- Category:Taxa named by Antenor Leitão de Carvalho

== Biography ==
Nomura, Hitoshi (1993). "A obra científica de Antenor Leitão de Carvalho (1910-1985)". Revista Brasileira de Zoologia 10 (3): 545–552. (in Portuguese). (texte)

== Sources ==
- Biographical information is based on a translation from an equivalent article at the French Wikipedia.
