= Hypostomus salgadae =

Scientific classification
- Kingdom: Animalia
- Phylum: Chordata
- Class: Actinopterygii
- Order: Siluriformes
- Family: Loricariidae
- Genus: Hypostomus
- Species: H. salgadae

Binomial name
- Hypostomus salgadae (Fowler, 1941)

Synonyms
- Peckoltia salgadae; Ancistrus salgadae

Species of fish

Hypostomus salgadae is a disputed species of catfish in the family Loricariidae that may be synonymous with the species Hypostomus carvalhoi. It is native to South America, where it occurs in the Jaguaribe River basin in Brazil. FishBase reports the maximum length of the species as 2 cm (0.8 inches) in standard length, but it is likely that the species can exceed this size. It is believed to be a facultative or obligate air-breather.

H. salgadae was originally described as Ancistrus salgadae by Henry Weed Fowler in 1941. A 2015 review conducted by Jonathan W. Armbruster, David C. Werneke, and Milton Tan reclassified the species as Hypostomus salgadae. In 2017, Cláudio H. Zawadzki, Telton P. A. Ramos, and Mark H. Sabaj Pérez suggested that H. salgadae is a junior synonym of H. carvalhoi. Despite this, some authorities consider Ancistrus salgadae to be the correct name.
