= Cunhai =

Cunhai may refer to:

- Amphisbaena cunhai, Hoogmoed & Ávila-Pires, 1991, a worm lizard species in the genus Amphisbaena
- Typhlonectes cunhai, a species of amphibian endemic to Brazil
