= C. cearensis =

C. cearensis may refer to:

- Canna cearensis, a garden plant
- Colobosauroides cearensis, a spectacled lizard
- Copaifera cearensis, a flowering plant
- Cyclopogon cearensis, a flowering plant
