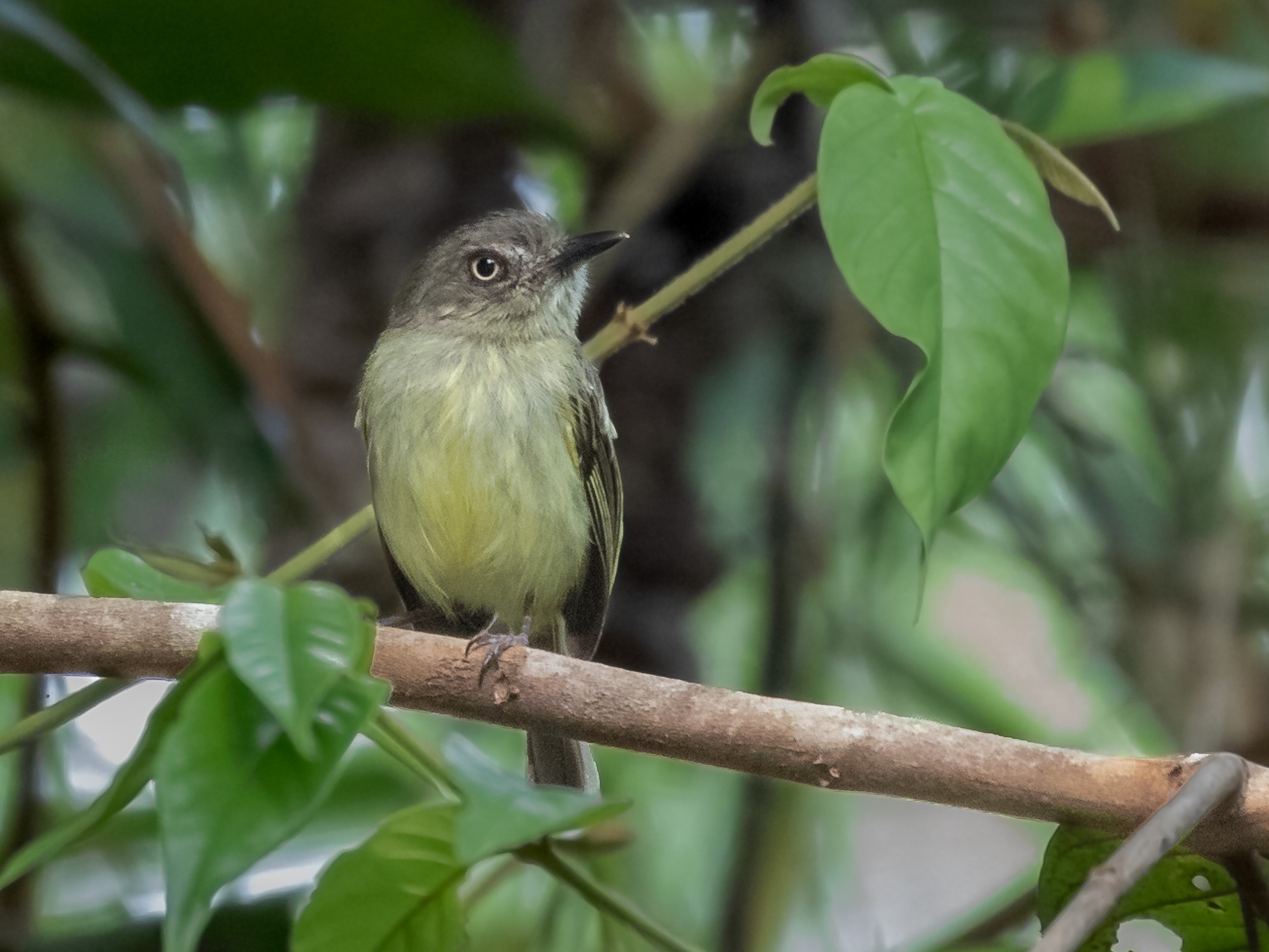

Conservation status
- Least Concern (IUCN 3.1)

Scientific classification
- Kingdom: Animalia
- Phylum: Chordata
- Class: Aves
- Order: Passeriformes
- Family: Tyrannidae
- Genus: Hemitriccus
- Species: H. iohannis

Binomial name
- Hemitriccus iohannis (Snethlage, 1907)

= Johannes's tody-tyrant =

Species of bird

Johannes's tody-tyrant, or Joao's tody-tyrant, (Hemitriccus iohannis) is a species of bird in the family Tyrannidae, the tyrant flycatchers. It is found in Bolivia, Brazil, Colombia, Ecuador, and Peru.

== Taxonomy and systematics ==
Johannes's tody-tyrant has a complicated taxonomic history. It was originally described in 1907 as Euscarthmus iohannis. During different parts of the twentieth century it was treated as a subspecies of the stripe-necked tody-tyrant (now H. striaticollis) and as a full species in genera Euscarthmornis and Idioptilon. Those two genera were eventually merged into Hemitriccus.

Johannes's tody-tyrant is monotypic.

== Description ==
Johannes's tody-tyrant is about 11 cm (4.3 in) long and weighs 9.2 to 12.7 g (0.32 to 0.45 oz). The sexes have the same plumage. Adults have a bright olive crown. They have brownish lores, sometimes with a white spot above them, and the color extends around the eye. Their back and rump are bright olive. Their wings are dusky olive with indistinct yellow edges on the flight feathers and indistinct yellow tips on the coverts; the latter show as two wing bars. Their tail is bright olive. Their throat is whitish with very thin black streaks. Their breast is pale yellow with blurry olive streaks; it and the flanks are smudged with olive. Their belly is unstreaked yellow. They have a whitish to pale straw-yellow iris, a dark gray to blackish bill, and pale yellowish, pinkish, or light gray legs and feet.

== Distribution and habitat ==
Johannes's tody-tyrant has a disjunct distribution in one large area and at least one much smaller one. The large area extends from most of eastern Peru and east into northern Bolivia and into western Brazil as far as the upper reaches of the Solimões, Juruá, and Purus rivers. A separate population is found in southern Colombia's Putumayo and Amazonas departments and possibly slightly into northeastern Ecuador. Another population is found in eastern Ecuador's Pastaza Province; it appears to be isolated but might be contiguous with the far northwestern part of the Peruvian range.

Johannes's tody-tyrant primarily inhabits humid subtropical forest along watercourses and oxbow lakes, where it favors vine tangles and dense shrubby areas. In Colombia it is found in terra firme forest. In elevation it reaches 800 m (2,600 ft) in Peru, 400 m (1,300 ft) in Colombia, and about 200 m (700 ft) in Ecuador.

== Behavior ==
=== Movement ===
Johannes's tody-tyrant is a year-round resident.

=== Feeding ===
Johannes's tody-tyrant feeds on arthropods. It typically forages singly, in pairs, or in small family groups and very seldom joins mixed-species feeding flocks. It mostly forages in the mid- to upper levels of dense brush and vine tangles. It takes most of its prey using short upward sallies from a perch to grab it from the underside of leaves.

=== Breeding ===
The breeding season of Johannes's tody-tyrant has not been defined but apparently includes July to October in southeastern Peru. Nothing else is known about the species' breeding biology.

=== Vocalization ===
The song of Johannes's tody-tyrant has been described as "an accelerating, rising trilled tew-tur'r'r'r'e'e'e'e? phrases interspersed with single tew notes or a slow, rising series of 3-6 tew notes". Another description is a "high, brisk 'tjudrrrri' ('tju' colliding with 'd'); 'drrrri' rising". Its call is single or paired tew notes.

== Status ==
The IUCN has assessed Johannes's tody-tyrant as being of Least Concern. It has a large range; its population size is not known and is believed to be decreasing. No immediate threats have been identified. It is considered widespread but "uncommon, inconspicuous, and easily overlooked (except by voice)" in Peru. It is "local and rare" in Colombia and found only around a few oxbow lakes in Ecuador. It is found in several protected areas in Peru and a few elsewhere.
