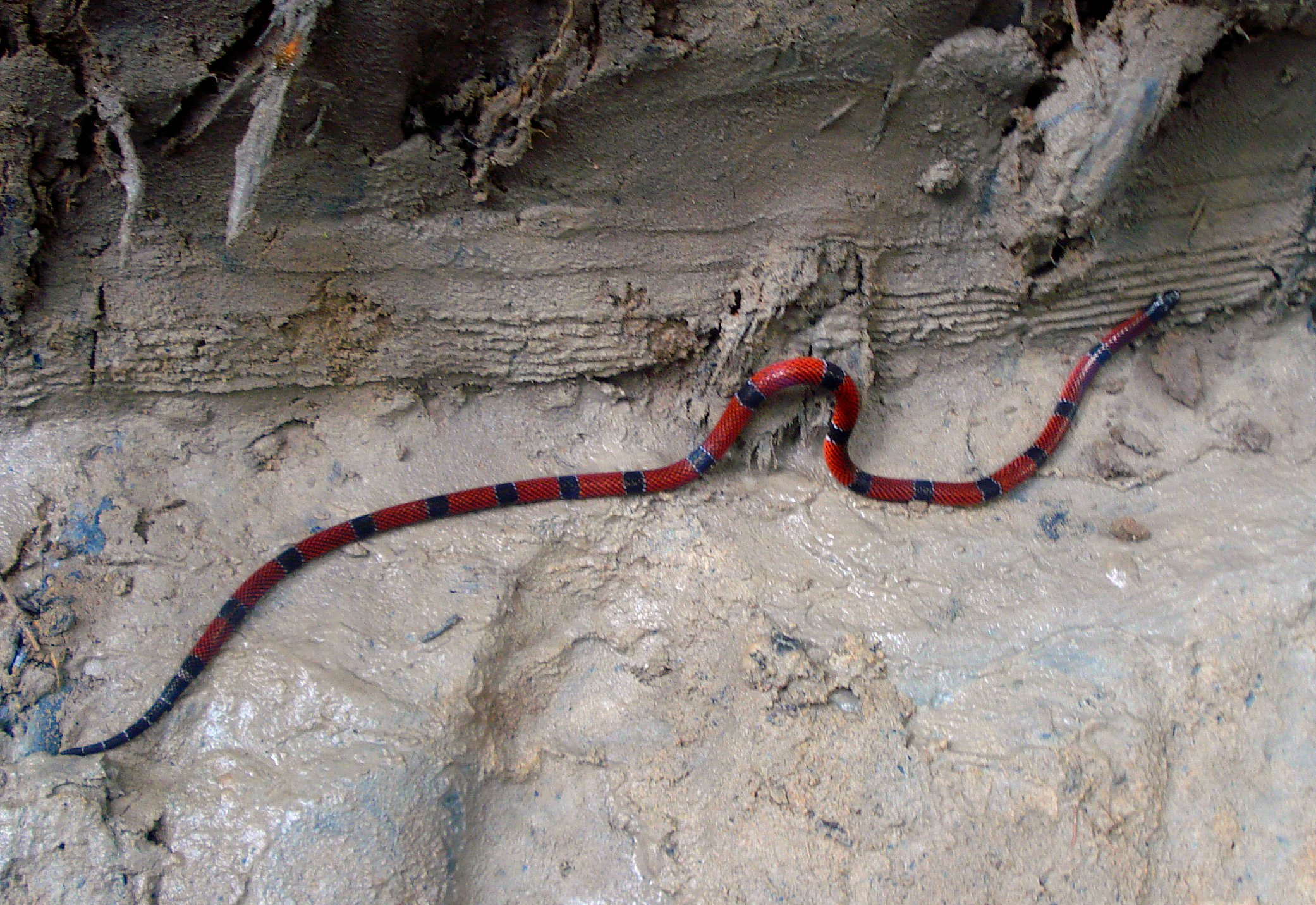

Conservation status
- Least Concern (IUCN 3.1)

Scientific classification
- Kingdom: Animalia
- Phylum: Chordata
- Class: Reptilia
- Order: Squamata
- Suborder: Serpentes
- Family: Elapidae
- Genus: Micrurus
- Species: M. paraensis

Binomial name
- Micrurus paraensis Cunha & Nascimento, 1973
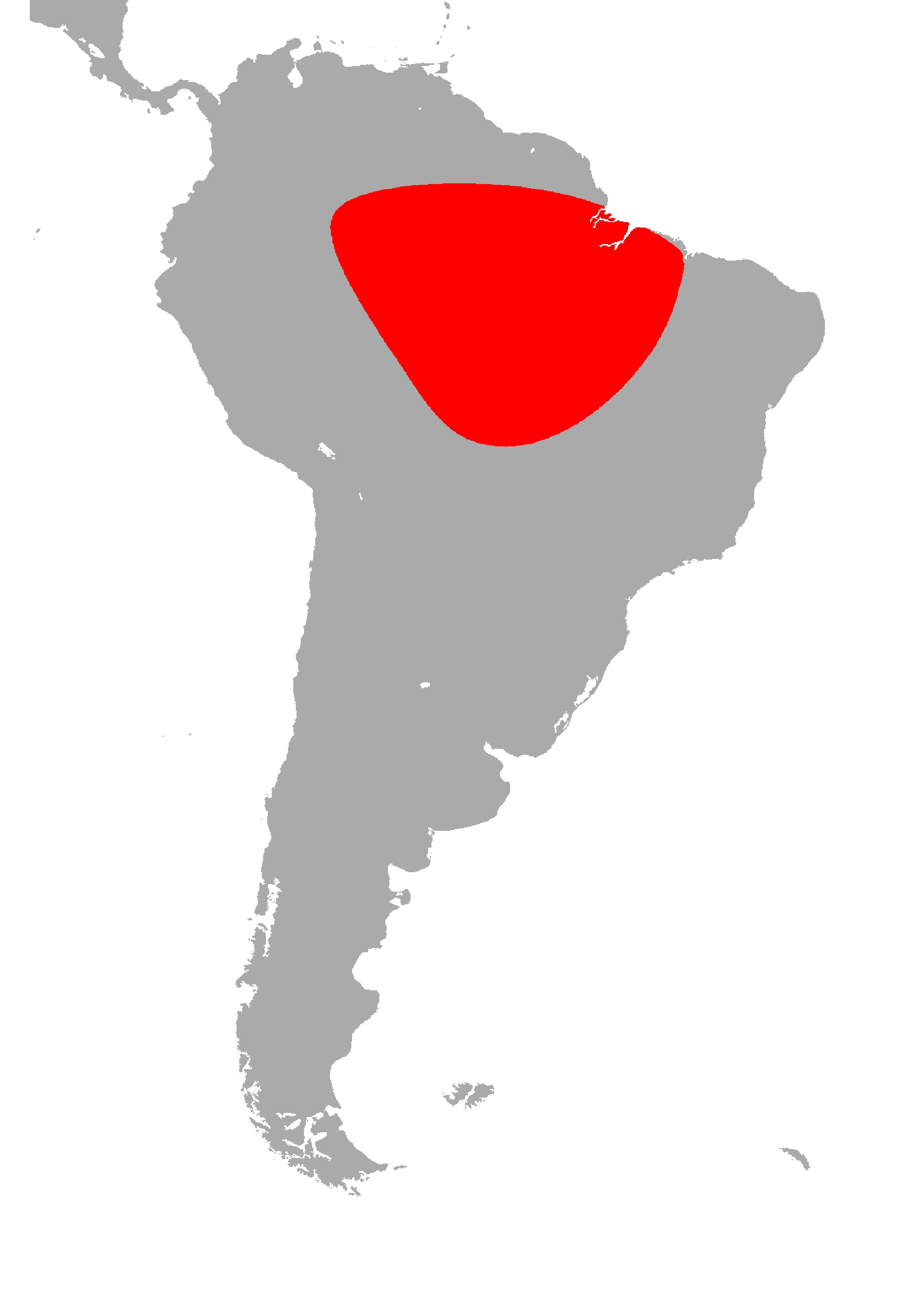

Synonyms
- Micrurus psiches [sic] paraensis Cunha & Nascimento, 1973; Micrurus psyches paraensis Cunha & Nascimento, 1973; Micrurus psyches donosoi Hoge, Cordeiro & Romano, 1976; Micrurus paraensis debruini Abuys, 1987

= Micrurus paraensis =

Pará coral snake

Species of snake

Micrurus paraensis, also known commonly as the Pará coral snake, is a species of venomous snake in the family Elapidae. The species is native to northern South America.

== Description ==
The color pattern of Micrurus paraensis consists of rings of red, black, and white. The black rings are not arranged in triads. The red rings are at least five times as wide as the black rings. The black rings are 2–3 dorsals and 2–3 ventrals wide. The white rings, which separate the black from the red, are one dorsal wide. There are 13–20 black rings on the body.

Males have 188–200 ventrals, and 42–52 subcaudals. Females have 194–213 ventrals, and 30–38 subcaudals.

== Geographic distribution ==
Micrurus paraensis is found in the Brazilian states of Amazonas, Maranhão, Mato Grosso, Pará, and Rondônia, and also in southern Suriname.

== Behavior ==
Micrurus paraensis is terrestrial and nocturnal.

== Diet ==
Micrurus paraensis preys on snakes such as Tantilla melanocephala, lizards, and other vertebrates that resemble snakes.

== Habitat ==
The preferred natural habitat of Micrurus paraensis is forests of the Amazon basin, at elevations from near sea level up to 400 metres (1,300 ft) above sea level, including disturbed forests, and in and around settlements.

== Reproduction ==
Micrurus paraensis is oviparous.
