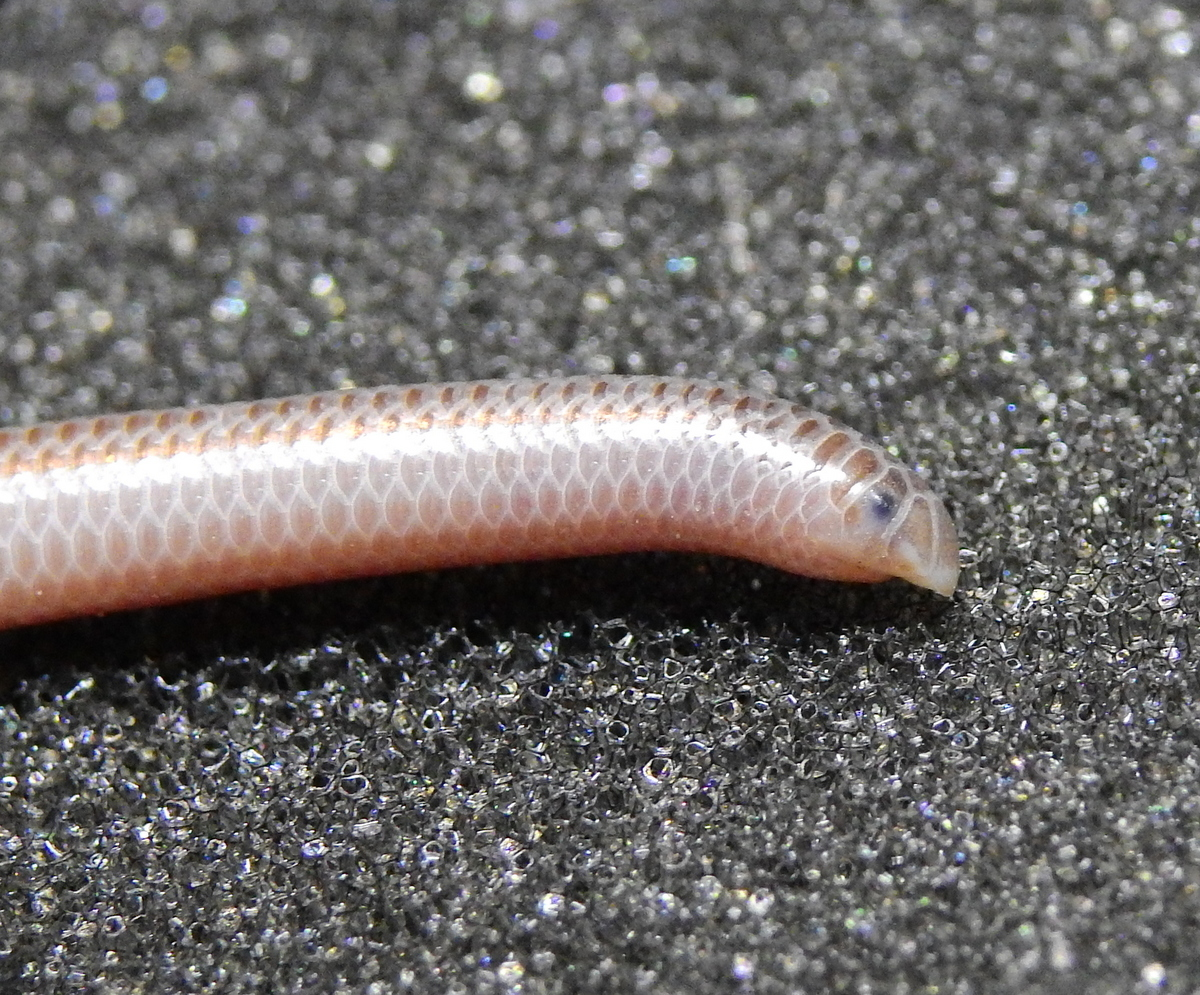
- Siagonodon borrichianus

Scientific classification
- Kingdom: Animalia
- Phylum: Chordata
- Class: Reptilia
- Order: Squamata
- Suborder: Serpentes
- Family: Leptotyphlopidae
- Subfamily: Epictinae
- Genus: Siagonodon; W. Peters, 1881

= Siagonodon =

Genus of snakes

Siagonodon is a genus of snakes in the family Leptotyphlopidae. The genus contains five species, all of which were previously placed in the genus Leptotyphlops.

== Species ==
The genus Siagonodon contains the following species.

- Siagonodon borrichianus (Degerbøl, 1923) – Degerbol's blind snake
- Siagonodon cupinensis (J.R. Bailey & A.L. Carvalho, 1946) – Mato Grosso blind snake
- Siagonodon exiguum Martins, Folly, Nunes-Ferreira, Garcia da Silva, Koch, Fouquet, Machado, Lopes, Pinto, Rodrigues, & Passos, 2023
- Siagonodon septemstriatus (J. Schneider, 1801) – seven-striped blind snake
