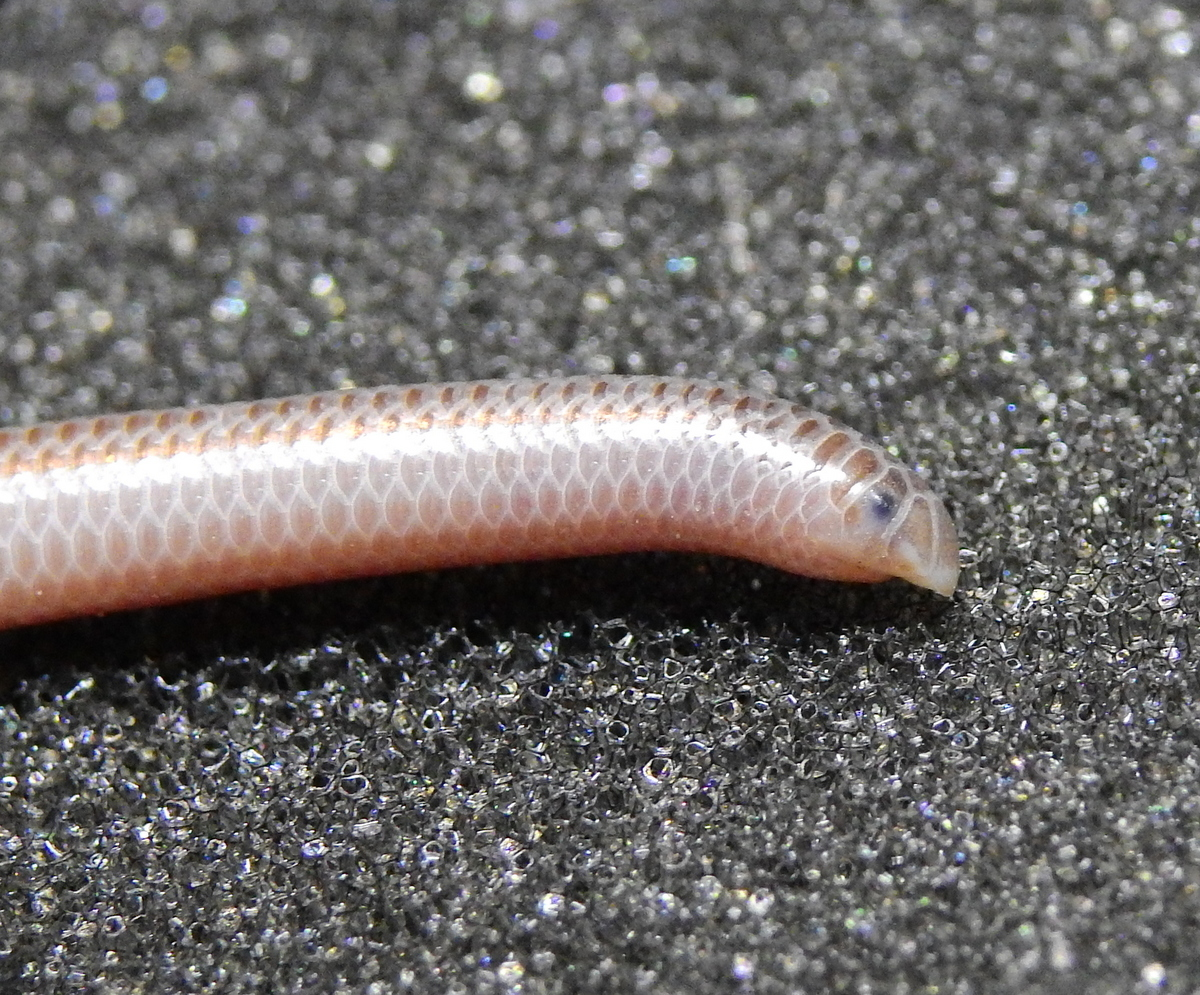

Conservation status
- Least Concern (IUCN 3.1)

Scientific classification
- Kingdom: Animalia
- Phylum: Chordata
- Class: Reptilia
- Order: Squamata
- Suborder: Serpentes
- Family: Leptotyphlopidae
- Genus: Siagonodon
- Species: S. borrichianus

Binomial name
- Siagonodon borrichianus (Degerbøl, 1923)

Synonyms
- Glauconia borrichiana Degerbøl, 1923; Leptotyphlops borrichianus — Amaral, 1929; Siagonodon borrichianus — Adalsteinsson et al., 2009

= Degerbol's blind snake =

Species of snake

Degerbøl's blind snake (Siagonodon borrichianus) is a species of snake in the family Leptotyphlopidae. The species is native to southern South America.

== Etymology ==
The specific name, borrichianus, is in honor of Danish scientist Ole Borch.

== Geographic range ==
S. borrichianus is found in western Argentina.

== Habitat ==
The preferred natural habitat of S. borrichianus is shrubland.

== Diet ==
S. borrichianus preys upon the larvae of ants and termites.

== Reproduction ==
S. borrichianus is oviparous.
