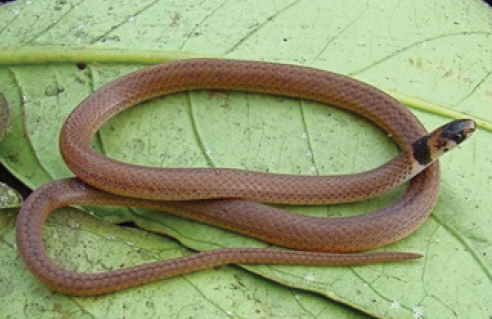

Conservation status
- Least Concern (IUCN 3.1)

Scientific classification
- Kingdom: Animalia
- Phylum: Chordata
- Class: Reptilia
- Order: Squamata
- Suborder: Serpentes
- Family: Colubridae
- Genus: Tantilla
- Species: T. melanocephala

Binomial name
- Tantilla melanocephala (Linnaeus, 1758)

Synonyms
- Coluber melanocephalus Linnaeus, 1758; Elaps melanocephalus — Wagler, 1824; Duberria melanocephala — Fitzinger, 1826; Calamaria melanocephala — Schlegel, 1837; Homalocranium melanocephalum — A.M.C. Duméril & Bibron, 1854; Tantilla melanocephala — Cope, 1861

= Tantilla melanocephala =

Species of snake

Tantilla melanocephala, commonly known as the black-headed snake, the neotropical black-headed snake, and la culebra de cabeza negra in Spanish, is a small species of snake in the subfamily Colubrinae of the family Colubridae. The species is native to Central America and South America.

== Geographic range ==
In Central America Tantilla melanocephala is found from Guatemala south to Panama. In South America it is found from Trinidad and Tobago south to northern Argentina.

== Habitat ==
The preferred natural habitats of Tantilla melanocephala are grassland, savanna, and forest, at altitudes from sea level to 2,750 m (9,020 ft), and it has also been found in artificial habitats such as pastures, gardens, and plantations.

== Description ==
Tantilla melanocephala may attain a total length of 50 cm (20 in), which includes a tail 10 cm (3.9 in) long.

Dorsally, it is pale brown or red, and some specimens also have 3 or 5 narrow brown stripes. The top of the head and neck are black or dark brown. Ventrally, it is yellowish white.

The dorsal scales are smooth, without apical pits, and arranged in 15 rows at midbody.

== Behavior ==
Tantilla melanocephala is terrestrial and diurnal.

== Diet ==
Tantilla melanocephala preys predominately upon centipedes and possibly occasionally other arthropods.

== As prey ==
Tantilla melanocephala is preyed upon by the venomous snake Micrurus paraensis.

== Reproduction ==
Tantilla melanocephala is oviparous.

== Taxonomy ==
Several species of snakes, which were originally described as species new to science, are synonyms of Tantilla melanocephala. The following is a partial list in chronological order.

- Elapomorphus mexicanus Günther, 1862
- Tantilla pallida Cope, 1887
- Homalocranium longifrontale Boulenger, 1896
- Homalocranium hoffmanni F. Werner, 1909
- Elapomorphus nuchalis Barbour, 1914
- Tantilla equatoriana Wilson & Mena, 1980
- Tantilla marcovani de Lema, 2004

== Etymology ==
The synonym Tantilla marcovani was named in honor of Brazilian biologist Marcovan Porto.
