= Mato Grosso blind snake =

Conservation status
- Least Concern (IUCN 3.1)

Scientific classification
- Kingdom: Animalia
- Phylum: Chordata
- Class: Reptilia
- Order: Squamata
- Suborder: Serpentes
- Family: Leptotyphlopidae
- Genus: Siagonodon
- Species: S. cupinensis

Binomial name
- Siagonodon cupinensis Bailey & A.L. Carvalho, 1946

Synonyms
- Leptotyphlops cupinensis Bailey & A.L. Carvalho, 1946; Leptotyphlops eupinensis [sic] Battersby & Swinton, 1954 (ex errore); Siagonodon cuoinensis — Adalsteinsson et al., 2009

Species of snake

The Mato Grosso blind snake (Siagonodon cupinensis) is a species of snake in the family Leptotyphlopidae. The species is native to northeastern South America.

== Geographic range ==
S. cupinensis is found in the Brazilian states of Amapá, Mato Grosso, and Pará, and in Suriname.

== Habitat ==
The preferred natural habitat of S. cupinensis is savanna.

== Description ==
S. cupinensis is uniformly yellowish, not striped. It has on average 270 middorsal scales from rostral to tail tip.

== Reproduction ==
S. cupinensis is oviparous.
