= Hamptophryne alios =

Conservation status
- Least Concern (IUCN 3.1)

Scientific classification
- Kingdom: Animalia
- Phylum: Chordata
- Class: Amphibia
- Order: Anura
- Family: Microhylidae
- Genus: Hamptophryne
- Species: H. alios

Binomial name
- Hamptophryne alios (Wild, 1995)

Synonyms
- Altigius alios Wild, 1995

Species of amphibian

Hamptophryne alios is a species of frog in the family Microhylidae. It is known from three localities in the southwestern Amazon Basin of Bolivia, Brazil, and Peru. This species used to constitute the monotypic genus Altigius, but molecular phylogenetic analyses have shown it to be close relative of the then-monotypic Hamptophryne, and the two genera have been merged.

== Etymology ==
The generic name Altigius honors Ronald Altig, specialist in amphibian larvae. The specific name alios is derived from the Latin words ala for "wing" and os for "mouth" and refers to the large, scalloped oral flaps pendant over the mouth of the tadpole.

== Description ==
The species description is based on a single adult male and series of tadpoles, one of them reared past metamorphosis. The adult male measures 49.5 mm (1.95 in) in snout–vent length. The head is broad but much narrower than body. The snout is rounded. The eyes are small. Skin is shagreen, and the occipital fold is complete. The fingers and toes have rounded tips and narrow fringes. Webbing is basal between the fingers and more developed between the toes. The dorsum is tan and mottled with dark brown. The venter is black with bluish-white flecks.

The tadpoles grow to 66 mm (2.6 in) in length. The body and tail are dark chocolate brown. There is a creamy-tan middorsal stripe running from the snout to the tail. Two large, pendant flaps enclose the mouth dorsally and are presumably used for feeding.

== Habitat and conservation ==
Natural habitats of Hamptophryne alios are tropical moist lowland forests in association with temporary swamps and permanent waterbodies. It is potentially threatened by habitat loss. The Brazilian record is based on two individuals captured near the Madeira River, in area that may become flooded because of development of hydro power.
