= Arcovomer =

Conservation status
- Least Concern (IUCN 3.1)

Scientific classification
- Kingdom: Animalia
- Phylum: Chordata
- Class: Amphibia
- Order: Anura
- Family: Microhylidae
- Subfamily: Gastrophryninae
- Genus: Arcovomer; Carvalho, 1954
- Species: A. passarellii

Binomial name
- Arcovomer passarellii Carvalho, 1954

Genus of amphibians

Arcovomer is a genus of frogs in the family Microhylidae. It is monotypic, being represented by the single species Arcovomer passarellii, commonly known as Passarelli's frog. It is endemic to south-eastern Brazil and is found in the states of Espírito Santo, Rio de Janeiro, and São Paulo. Frogs from Espírito Santo may represent another, undescribed species. The name honours Antonio Passarelli who collected the holotype.

the two newly described species are:

- Arcovomer moqueca
- Arcovomer ubatuba

== Description and behaviour ==
Arcovomer passarellii is a small, slender-bodied frog. The male is about 16–20 mm (0.63–0.79 in) in snout–vent length, and the female 22–26 mm (0.87–1.02 in). Its body is brown above with a distinct irregular dark pattern running the whole length of the animal.

Male frogs call after sunset. The advertisement call is a sharp, short whistle. When disturbed, these frogs may jump and then assume a stiff-leg posture, possibly as a means to avoid detection by predators relying on their sight.

== Habitat and conservation ==
This species inhabits lowland primary and secondary forests. It is a ground-dwelling frog that breeds in temporary pools. Although it is a common species, it is declining in abundance, probably because of habitat loss.
