= Loxopholis ferreirai =

Conservation status
- Least Concern (IUCN 3.1)

Scientific classification
- Kingdom: Animalia
- Phylum: Chordata
- Class: Reptilia
- Order: Squamata
- Family: Gymnophthalmidae
- Genus: Loxopholis
- Species: L. ferreirai

Binomial name
- Loxopholis ferreirai (Rodrigues & Ávila-Pires, 2005)

Synonyms
- Leposoma ferreirai Rodrigues & Ávila-Pires, 2005; Loxopholis ferreirai — Goicoechea et al., 2005

Species of lizard

Loxopholis ferreirai is a species of lizard in the family Gymnophthalmidae. The species is endemic to Brazil.

== Etymology ==
The specific name, ferreirai, is in honor of Portuguese naturalist Alexandre Rodrigues Ferreira.

== Geographic range ==
L. ferreirai is found in the Brazilian state of Amazonas.

== Habitat ==
The preferred natural habitat of L. ferreirai is forest.

== Reproduction ==
L. ferreirai is oviparous, and it does not reproduce by parthenogenesis.
