= Loxopholis parietalis =

Conservation status
- Least Concern (IUCN 3.1)

Scientific classification
- Kingdom: Animalia
- Phylum: Chordata
- Class: Reptilia
- Order: Squamata
- Suborder: Lacertoidea
- Family: Gymnophthalmidae
- Genus: Loxopholis
- Species: L. parietalis

Binomial name
- Loxopholis parietalis (Cope, 1886)

Species of lizard

Loxopholis parietalis, the common root lizard, is a species of lizard in the family Gymnophthalmidae. It is found in Colombia, Venezuela, Ecuador, and Peru.
