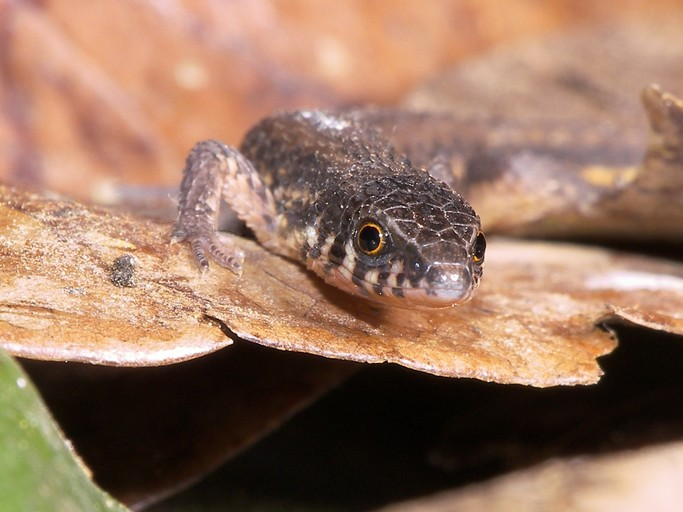

Conservation status
- Least Concern (IUCN 3.1)

Scientific classification
- Kingdom: Animalia
- Phylum: Chordata
- Class: Reptilia
- Order: Squamata
- Suborder: Lacertoidea
- Family: Gymnophthalmidae
- Genus: Loxopholis
- Species: L. rugiceps

Binomial name
- Loxopholis rugiceps Cope, 1869

= Loxopholis rugiceps =

Species of lizard

Loxopholis rugiceps is a species of lizard in the family Gymnophthalmidae. It is found in Colombia and Panama.
