= Loxopholis osvaldoi =

Conservation status
- Least Concern (IUCN 3.1)

Scientific classification
- Kingdom: Animalia
- Phylum: Chordata
- Class: Reptilia
- Order: Squamata
- Family: Gymnophthalmidae
- Genus: Loxopholis
- Species: L. osvaldoi

Binomial name
- Loxopholis osvaldoi (Ávila-Pires, 1995)

Synonyms
- Leposoma osvaldoi Ávila-Pires, 1995; Loxopholis osvaldoi — Goicoechea et al., 2016

Species of lizard

Loxopholis osvaldoi is a species of lizard in the family Gymnophthalmidae. The species is endemic to Brazil.

== Etymology ==
The specific name, osvaldoi, is in honor of Brazilian herpetologist Osvaldo Rodrigues da Cunha.

== Description ==
Loxopholis osvaldoi may attain a snout-to-vent length (SVL) of 37 mm (1.5 in).

== Geographic distribution ==
Loxopholis osvaldoi is found in the Brazilian states of Amazonas, Mato Grosso, Pará, and Rondônia.

== Habitat ==
The natural habitat of Loxopholis osvaldoi is forest.

== Behavior ==
Loxopholis osvaldoi is diurnal and terrestrial, foraging in leaf litter on the ground.

== Diet ==
Loxopholis osvaldoi preys upon arthropods.

== Reproduction ==
Loxopholis osvaldoi is oviparous.
