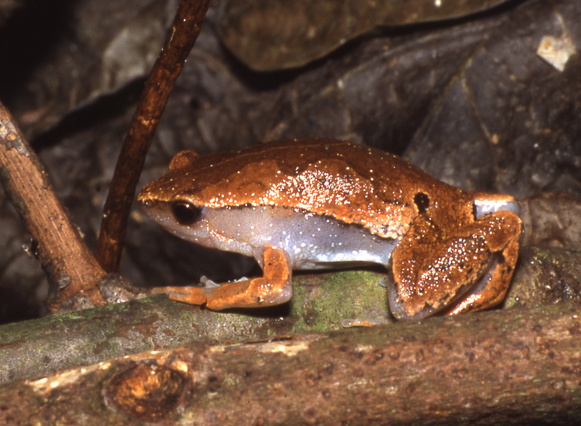

Conservation status
- Least Concern (IUCN 3.1)

Scientific classification
- Kingdom: Animalia
- Phylum: Chordata
- Class: Amphibia
- Order: Anura
- Family: Microhylidae
- Genus: Hamptophryne
- Species: H. boliviana

Binomial name
- Hamptophryne boliviana (Parker, 1927)

Synonyms
- Chiasmocleis boliviana Parker, 1927

= Hamptophryne boliviana =

Species of amphibian

Hamptophryne boliviana, also known as the Bolivian bleating frog or Amazon sheep frog, is a species of frogs in the family Microhylidae. It is found in the northern and western sides of the Amazon basin in Bolivia, Brazil, Colombia, Ecuador, French Guiana, Guyana, Peru, Suriname, and Venezuela. Genetic analysis suggests hidden diversity within the nominal species.

== Description ==
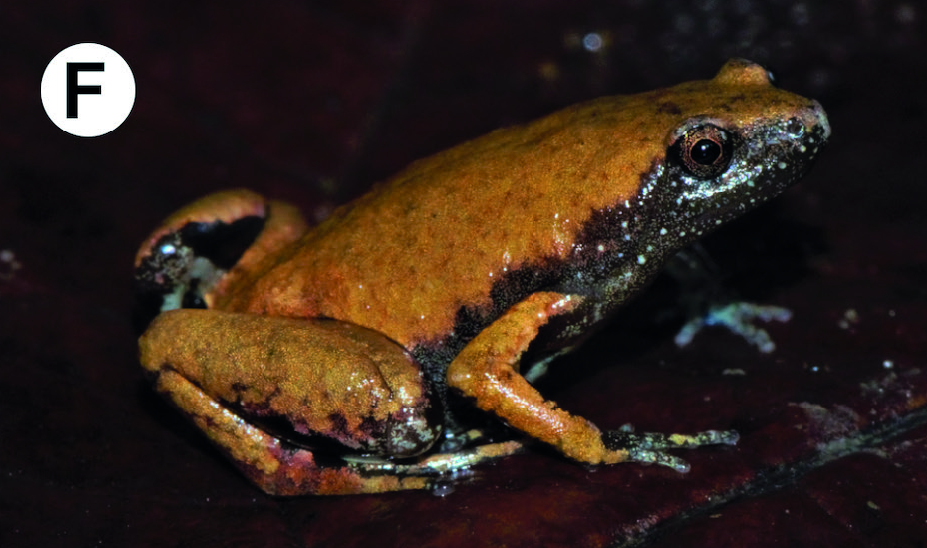
Amapá, Brazil

Adult males from Peru measure 34–39 mm (1.3–1.5 in) and adult females 39–44 mm (1.5–1.7 in) in snout–vent length; some populations might be smaller in body size. The body is moderately robust. The fingers and toes bear distinct terminal discs; lateral fringes and webbing are not present. The dorsum is tan with a large, brown mid-dorsal blotch. There is usually a faint, creamy white mid-dorsal stripe. The flanks, sides of the head, and concealed surfaces of the limbs are dark brown. Males have dark brown throat. The belly and ventral surfaces of the hind limbs are creamy white with brown spots or reticulations. The iris is pale bronze and has fine black reticulations.

== Habitat and conservation ==
These frogs are found in the leaf litter of primary and secondary tropical rainforests at elevations up to 400 m (1,300 ft) above sea level. They are nocturnal and feed on ants on the ground or on tree trunks and branches. Breeding takes place in ponds and flooded areas within forest after heavy rains.

This species is widespread but uncommon in much of its range. No significant threats affecting this species have been identified.

== Behavior ==
The frog has been spotted in close association with Xenesthis immanis, the Colombian lesser black tarantula. It is possible that they have a mutualistic relationship in which the spider may protect the frog and its eggs from predators while the frog protects the spider's eggs from ants, as observed between frog Chiasmocleis ventrimaculata and the same species of tarantula.
