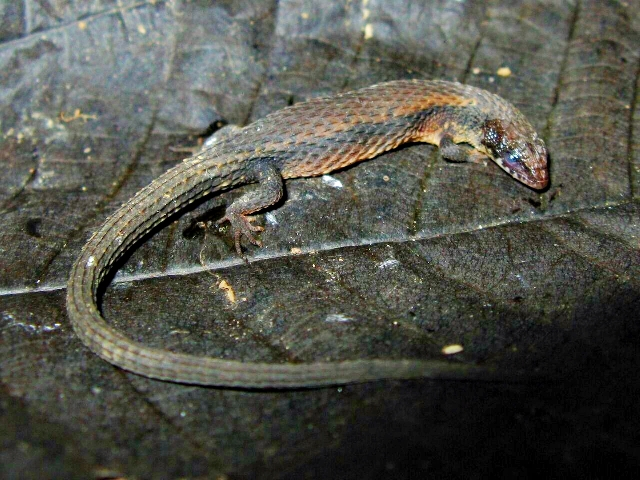

Conservation status
- Least Concern (IUCN 3.1)

Scientific classification
- Kingdom: Animalia
- Phylum: Chordata
- Class: Reptilia
- Order: Squamata
- Family: Gymnophthalmidae
- Genus: Loxopholis
- Species: L. southi

Binomial name
- Loxopholis southi (Ruthven & Gaige, 1924)

Synonyms
- Leposoma southi Ruthven & Gaige, 1924; Loxopholis southi — Goicoechea, 2016

= Loxopholis southi =

Species of lizard

Loxopholis southi, also known commonly as the northern spectacled lizard and the southern leposoma, is a species of lizard in the family Gymnophthalmidae. The species is native to southeastern Central America and northwestern South America. There are two recognized subspecies.

== Etymology ==
The specific name, southi, is in honor of John Glover South (1873–1940), who was an American physician and diplomat.

== Geographic range ==
L. southi is found in Costa Rica, Panama, and Colombia. They inhabit forested environments, particularly tropical moist forest, and are typically found in leaf litter on the forest floor.

== Reproduction ==
L. southi is oviparous.

== Subspecies ==
Two subspecies are recognized as being valid, including the nominotypical subspecies:

- Loxopholis southi orientalis (Taylor, 1955)
- Loxopholis southi southi (Ruthven & Gaige, 1924)

Nota bene: A trinomial authority in parentheses indicates that the subspecies was originally described in a genus other than Loxopholis.
