= Chiasmocleis antenori =

Conservation status
- Least Concern (IUCN 3.1)

Scientific classification
- Kingdom: Animalia
- Phylum: Chordata
- Class: Amphibia
- Order: Anura
- Family: Microhylidae
- Genus: Chiasmocleis
- Species: C. antenori

Binomial name
- Chiasmocleis antenori (Walker, 1973)

Synonyms
- Syncope antenori Walker, 1973

Species of frog

Chiasmocleis antenori, also known as the Ecuador silent frog, is a species of frog in the family Microhylidae. It is found in eastern Ecuador, eastern Peru, and western Brazil (Acre). It might be a species complex.

== Etymology ==
Chiasmocleis antenori is named for Antenor Leitão de Carvalho.

== Description ==
Adult males measure 11–12 mm (0.4–0.5 in) and adult females 12–14 mm (0.5–0.6 in) in snout–vent length. The snout is strongly projecting over the lower jaw in the lateral view, but somewhat truncate when view from above. The tympanum is distinct. The outermost fingers are rudimentary (some consider the first one to be absent); the remaining ones are bluntly rounded at the tips and have fleshy margins. Only four toes are evident; they bear small but distinct disks at the tips. Coloration is dark brown both dorsally and ventrally, flecked with small white spots that are more numerous and larger ventrally than dorsally.

== Habitat and conservation ==
Chiasmocleis antenori occurs in both primary and secondary tropical moist forest (terra firme and flooded) at elevations of 200–1,740 m (660–5,710 ft) above sea level. It can be found in both leaf litter and bromeliads. Breeding takes place in phytotelmata (leaf axils). The tadpoles are free-swimming but non-feeding. It is an uncommon species that can be locally threatened by habitat loss (including collection of bromeliads), but has an extensive range, occurs in several protected areas, and is not considered threatened overall.
