= Loxopholis snethlageae =

Scientific classification
- Kingdom: Animalia
- Phylum: Chordata
- Class: Reptilia
- Order: Squamata
- Family: Gymnophthalmidae
- Genus: Loxopholis
- Species: L. snethlageae

Binomial name
- Loxopholis snethlageae (Ávila-Pires, 1995)

Synonyms
- Leposoma snethlageae Ávila-Pires, 1995; Loxopholis snethlageae — Goicoechea et al., 2016

Species of lizard

Loxopholis snethlageae is a species of lizard in the family Gymnophthalmidae. The species is endemic to Brazil.

== Etymology ==
The specific name, snethlageae, is in honor of German-Brazilian ornithologist Emilie Snethlage.

== Geographic range ==
L. snethlageae is found in the drainage basins of the Solimões River and the Urucu River, in the southwestern part of the Brazilian state of Amazonas, in northwestern Brazil.

== Reproduction ==
L. snethlageae is oviparous.
