= South American gecko =

Conservation status
- Least Concern (IUCN 3.1)

Scientific classification
- Kingdom: Animalia
- Phylum: Chordata
- Class: Reptilia
- Order: Squamata
- Suborder: Gekkota
- Family: Sphaerodactylidae
- Genus: Gonatodes
- Species: G. eladioi

Binomial name
- Gonatodes eladioi Nascimento, Ávila-Pires & Cunha, 1987

Species of lizard

The South American gecko (Gonatodes eladioi) is a species of lizard in the family Sphaerodactylidae. The species is endemic to Brazil.

== Etymology ==
The specific name, eladioi, is in honor of Brazilian zoologist Eladio da Cruz Lima (1900–1943).

== Geographic range ==
Gonatodes eladioi is found in the Brazilian states of Mato Grosso and Pará.

== Habitat ==
The preferred natural habitat of G. eladioi is forest.

== Description ==
Gonatodes eladioi may attain a snout-to-vent length of 3.4 cm (1.3 in).

== Behavior ==
Gonatodes eladioi is diurnal.

== Reproduction ==
Gonatodes eladioi is oviparous.
