= Loxopholis guianense =

Conservation status
- Least Concern (IUCN 3.1)

Scientific classification
- Kingdom: Animalia
- Phylum: Chordata
- Class: Reptilia
- Order: Squamata
- Family: Gymnophthalmidae
- Genus: Loxopholis
- Species: L. guianense

Binomial name
- Loxopholis guianense (Ruibal, 1952)

Species of lizard

Loxopholis guianense, the Guyana root tegu, is a species of lizard in the family Gymnophthalmidae. It is endemic to eastern Amazonia, found in Guyana, French Guiana, Suriname, and Brazil. The Guyana root tegu is terrestrial and diurnal. In its range it inhabits both upland and várzea forests, where it prefers to be in shaded spots and leaf litter. It is often found near creeks and small tributaries. It feeds on terrestrial arthropods, especially springtails.
