= Alphonse Richard Hoge =

Brazilian herpetologist (1912–1982)

- Born: 5 September 1912; Cacequi, Rio Grande do Sul, Brazil
- Died: 25 December 1982 (aged 70); São Paulo, Brazil
- Known for: Research on South American lizards and venomous snakes
- Scientific career
- Fields: Herpetology
- Workplaces: Instituto Butantan

Alphonse Richard Hoge (5 September 1912 – 25 December 1982) was a Brazilian herpetologist. His research focused on lizards and venomous snakes of South America.

== Biography ==
Hoge's father was a Belgian engineer who spent periods in Brazil supervising bridge construction projects. From 1913, Hoge lived with his family in Ghent, Belgium. Between 1929 and 1934, he studied natural sciences and medicine at Ghent University. He subsequently became an assistant to Georges Bobeau in Paris, who was researching the use of snake venom to inhibit the growth of cancer cells. In 1939, Hoge returned to Brazil and worked for the pharmaceutical company Ciba, Roche & Torres. In 1946, he joined the Instituto Butantan, and in 1969 he was appointed head of its Department of Biology. He retired in 1982.

Between 1946 and 1981, Hoge published 112 scientific articles. Almost all were herpetological in nature and dealt with the systematics, distribution and description of numerous new taxa, including Atropoides occiduus, Bothrops fonsecai, Bothrops marajoensis, Bothrops moojeni, Bothrops sanctaecrucis, Corallus cropanii, Erythrolamprus mossoroensis, Lygophis paucidens, Oxyrhopus guibei, Phalotris mertensi, Psychosaura macrorhyncha and Trimeresurus brongersmai. His principal works included Preliminary Account on Neotropical Crotalinae (Serpentes Viperidae) (1965), Neotropical Pit Vipers, Sea Snakes, and Coral Snakes (1971), Sinopse das serpentes peçonhentas do Brasil. Serpentes, Elapidae e Viperidae (1973; second edition 1978), and Poisonous Snakes of the World. I. Check List of the Pit Vipers. Viperidea, Viperidae, Crotalinae (1978). With the exception of the first title, all were co-authored by his wife, Alma Romano.

One of Hoge's most significant contributions to biology was his study of the golden lancehead (Bothrops insularis), which is endemic to the small, rugged island of Ilha da Queimada Grande off the southeastern coast of the Brazilian state of São Paulo. The species, discovered by Hoge's colleague at the Instituto Butantan, Afrânio Pompílio Gastos do Amaral, has a high incidence of sexual abnormalities, in some cases extending to hermaphroditism. The proportion of intersex individuals had increased from Amaral's discovery of the species in the early 1920s to 70 percent by the 1950s, when Hoge investigated the phenomenon in detail.

Hoge died on 25 December 1982 as a result of a medical accident.

== Eponyms ==
The snake species Atractus alphonsehogei, the worm lizard Amphisbaena hogei, and Hoge's side-necked turtle (Mesoclemmys hogei) were named in his honor.

== Selected publications ==
- Preliminary Account on Neotropical Crotalinae (Serpentes Viperidae). 1965.
- Neotropical Pit Vipers, Sea Snakes, and Coral Snakes. 1971.
- Sinopse das serpentes peçonhentas do Brasil. Serpentes, Elapidae e Viperidae. 1973; second edition 1978.
- Poisonous Snakes of the World. I. Check List of the Pit Vipers. Viperidea, Viperidae, Crotalinae. 1978.
- The books above were published with the collaboration of Alma Romano, except for the 1965 title.
