= Loxopholis ioanna =

Conservation status
- Data Deficient (IUCN 3.1)

Scientific classification
- Kingdom: Animalia
- Phylum: Chordata
- Class: Reptilia
- Order: Squamata
- Family: Gymnophthalmidae
- Genus: Loxopholis
- Species: L. ioanna

Binomial name
- Loxopholis ioanna (Uzzell, Jr. & Barry, 1971)

Species of lizard

Loxopholis ioanna is a species of lizard in the family Gymnophthalmidae. It is endemic to Colombia.
