= Loxopholis caparensis =

Conservation status
- Data Deficient (IUCN 3.1)

Scientific classification
- Kingdom: Animalia
- Phylum: Chordata
- Class: Reptilia
- Order: Squamata
- Suborder: Lacertoidea
- Family: Gymnophthalmidae
- Genus: Loxopholis
- Species: L. caparensis

Binomial name
- Loxopholis caparensis (Esqueda, 2005)

Species of lizard

Loxopholis caparensis is a species of lizard in the family Gymnophthalmidae. It is found in Venezuela and Colombia.
