= Loxopholis hexalepis =

Conservation status
- Least Concern (IUCN 3.1)

Scientific classification
- Kingdom: Animalia
- Phylum: Chordata
- Class: Reptilia
- Order: Squamata
- Suborder: Lacertoidea
- Family: Gymnophthalmidae
- Genus: Loxopholis
- Species: L. hexalepis

Binomial name
- Loxopholis hexalepis (Ayala & Harris, 1982)

Species of lizard

Loxopholis hexalepis, the six-scaled tegu, is a species of lizard in the family Gymnophthalmidae. It is found in Venezuela and Colombia.
