= Loxopholis percarinatum =

Conservation status
- Least Concern (IUCN 3.1)

Scientific classification
- Kingdom: Animalia
- Phylum: Chordata
- Class: Reptilia
- Order: Squamata
- Suborder: Lacertoidea
- Family: Gymnophthalmidae
- Genus: Loxopholis
- Species: L. percarinatum

Binomial name
- Loxopholis percarinatum (Müller, 1923)

Species of lizard

Loxopholis percarinatum, Müller's tegu, is a species of lizard in the family Gymnophthalmidae. It is found in Guyana, Suriname, French Guiana, Venezuela, Colombia, Brazil, and Bolivia.
