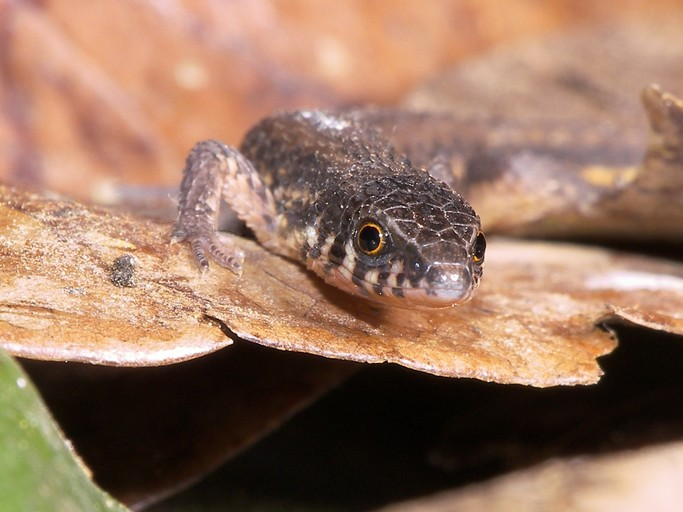
- Loxopholis rugiceps

Scientific classification
- Kingdom: Animalia
- Phylum: Chordata
- Class: Reptilia
- Order: Squamata
- Family: Gymnophthalmidae
- Genus: Loxopholis; Cope, 1869

Type species
- Loxopholis rugiceps Cope, 1869

Species
- 11 species (see text)

= Loxopholis =

Genus of lizards

Loxopholis is a genus of lizards in the family Gymnophthalmidae. The genus is endemic to South America.

== Species ==
The genus Loxopholis contains 11 species which are recognized as being valid.

- Loxopholis caparensis (Esqueda, 2005)
- Loxopholis ferreirai (Rodrigues & Ávila-Pires, 2005)
- Loxopholis guianense (Ruibal, 1952)
- Loxopholis hexalepis (Ayala & Harris, 1982) – six-scaled tegu
- Loxopholis ioanna (Uzzell & Barry, 1971)
- Loxopholis osvaldoi (Ávila-Pires, 1995)
- Loxopholis parietalis (Cope, 1886) – common root lizard
- Loxopholis percarinatum (L. Müller, 1923) – Müller's tegu
- Loxopholis rugiceps Cope, 1869
- Loxopholis snethlageae (Ávila-Pires, 1995)
- Loxopholis southi (Ruthven & Gaige, 1924) – northern spectacled lizard

Nota bene: A binomial authority in parentheses indicates that the species was originally described in a genus other than Loxopholis.
