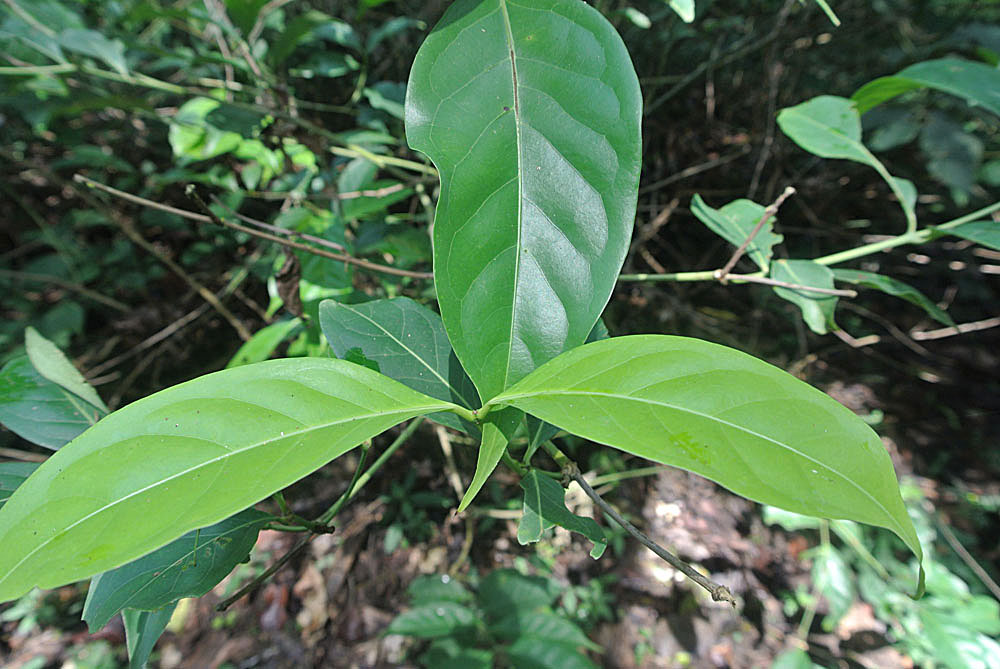

Scientific classification
- Kingdom: Plantae
- Clade: Tracheophytes
- Clade: Angiosperms
- Clade: Eudicots
- Clade: Rosids
- Order: Malpighiales
- Family: Malpighiaceae
- Genus: Diplopterys
- Species: D. cabrerana

Binomial name
- Diplopterys cabrerana (Cuatrec.) B.Gates

Synonyms
- Banisteriopsis cabrerana Cuatrec.

= Diplopterys cabrerana =

Species of plant

Diplopterys cabrerana is a shrub native to the Amazon Basin, spanning the countries of Brazil, Colombia, Ecuador and Peru. In the Quechua languages it is called chaliponga or chagropanga; in parts of Ecuador it is known as chacruna—a name otherwise reserved for Psychotria viridis.

D. cabrerana and P. viridis are both common admixtures for ayahuasca. Both species are rich sources of DMT, a tryptamine thought to be endogenous in humans and many other species. D. cabrerana additionally produces 5-MeO-DMT.

The plant stores the alkaloids N,N-DMT, 5-MeO-N,N-DMT, and N-methyltetrahydro-beta-carboline in its leaves and stems. Leaf samples were found to be 0.17-1.75% N,N-DMT, but only trace amounts of N-methyltetrahydro-beta-carboline occur in the leaves. The leaves also store methyltryptamine and trace amounts of bufotenin.

Cuttings of D. cabrerana are transplantable. The cuttings are either planted in soil directly, or rooted first in water.

== See also ==
- Psychedelic plants
