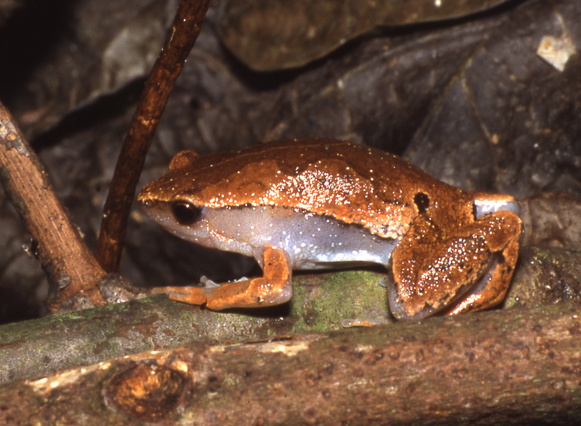
- Hamptophryne boliviana

Scientific classification
- Domain: Eukaryota
- Kingdom: Animalia
- Phylum: Chordata
- Class: Amphibia
- Order: Anura
- Family: Microhylidae
- Subfamily: Gastrophryninae
- Genus: Hamptophryne; A. L. Carvalho, 1954

Synonyms
- Altigius Wild, 1995

= Hamptophryne =

Genus of amphibians

Hamptophryne (common name: bleating frogs) is a small genus of microhylid frogs from South America. The genus was previously monotypic, but because of the close phylogenetic relationship between Hamptophryne and Altigius, another monotypic genus, the latter was placed in synonymy with Hamptophryne in 2012.

== Species ==
There are two species in the genus:

- Hamptophryne alios (Wild, 1995)
- Hamptophryne boliviana (Parker, 1927)
