= Four-toed amapasaurus =

Amapasaurus

Conservation status
- Least Concern (IUCN 3.1)

Scientific classification
- Kingdom: Animalia
- Phylum: Chordata
- Class: Reptilia
- Order: Squamata
- Family: Gymnophthalmidae
- Genus: Amapasaurus; Cunha, 1970
- Species: A. tetradactylus

Binomial name
- Amapasaurus tetradactylus Cunha, 1970

Species of lizard

The four-toed amapasaurus (Amapasaurus tetradactylus) is a lizard that was discovered in 1970 by Osvaldo Rodrigues da Cunha. It is the only species in the genus Amapasaurus.

== Geographic range ==
This species is found in Brazil and Guyana.

== Description ==
It has small atrophied legs. It is very similar to the genus Leposoma, except for the number of fingers. Amapasaurus tetradactylus has four digits, and the lizards of the genus Leposoma have five.

== Habitat and behavior ==
It lives on the forest floor and is diurnal.

== Reproduction ==
Amapasaurus tetradactylus is oviparous.
