= Seven-striped blind snake =

Conservation status
- Least Concern (IUCN 3.1)

Scientific classification
- Kingdom: Animalia
- Phylum: Chordata
- Class: Reptilia
- Order: Squamata
- Suborder: Serpentes
- Family: Leptotyphlopidae
- Genus: Siagonodon
- Species: S. septemstriatus

Binomial name
- Siagonodon septemstriatus (Schneider, 1801)

Synonyms
- Typhlopes septemstriatus Schneider, 1801; Typhlops senptemstriatus [sic] Wagler, 1830 (ex errore); Catodon septem-striatus — A.M.C. Duméril & Bibron, 1844; Stenostoma (Catodon) septemstriatum — Jan, 1860; Siagonodon septemstriatus — W. Peters, 1881; Glauconia septemstriata – Boulenger, 1893; Leptotyphlops septemstriatus — Mertens, 1925; Leptotyphlops tatacua Briceño-Rossi, 1934; Leptotyphlops septemlineata [sic] Hoffstetter & Gasc, 1969 (ex errore); Siagonodon septemstriatus — Adalsteinsson et al., 2009

Species of snake

The seven-striped blind snake (Siagonodon septemstriatus) is a species of snake in the family Leptotyphlopidae. The species is native to northeastern South America.

== Geographic range ==
S. septemstriatus is found in Bolivia, northern Brazil (Amazonas, Pará, Roraima), French Guiana, Guyana, Suriname, and southeastern Venezuela.

== Habitat ==
The preferred natural habitat of S. septemstriatus is forest, at altitudes from sea level to 500 m (1,600 ft).

== Description ==
S. septemstriatus is yellowish, with seven black stripes along the dorsal scales. It may attain a snout-to-vent length (SVL) of 27 cm (11 in), with a tail 1 cm (0.39 in) long.

== Behavior ==
S. septemstriatus is terrestrial and fossorial.

== Reproduction ==
S. septemstriatus is oviparous.
