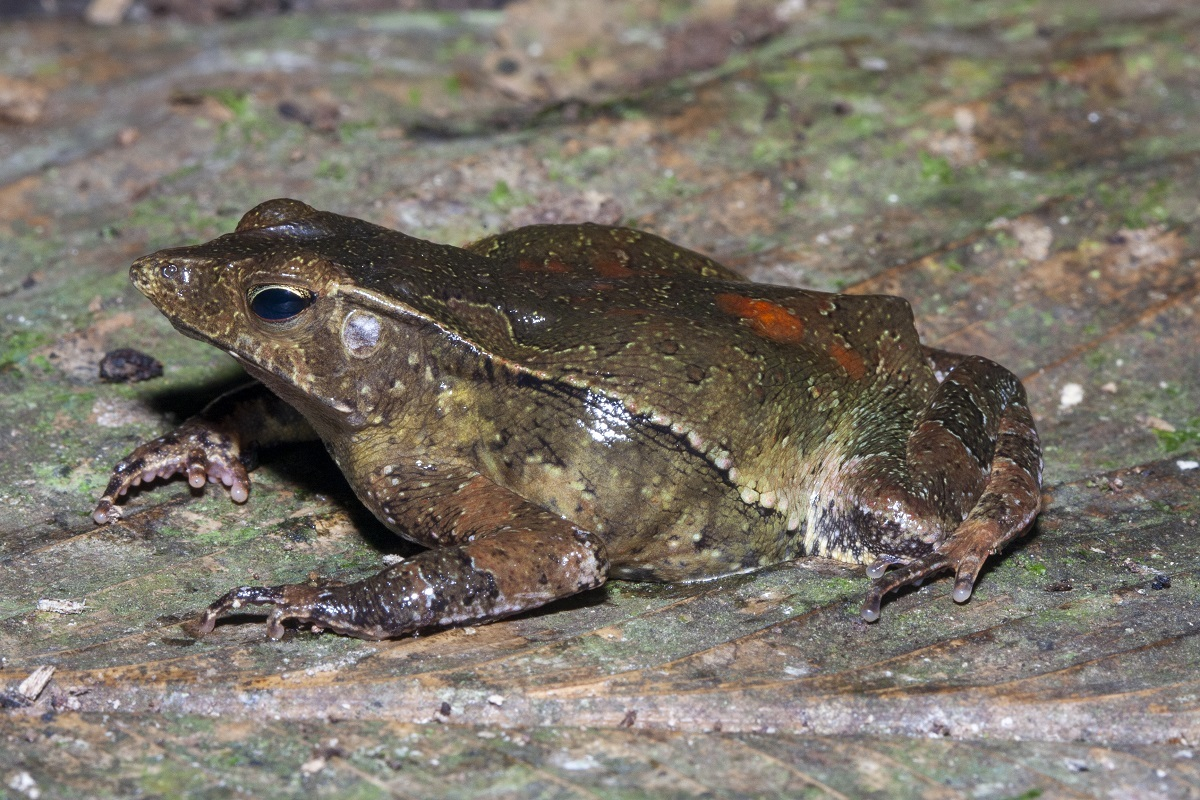

Conservation status
- Least Concern (IUCN 3.1)

Scientific classification
- Kingdom: Animalia
- Phylum: Chordata
- Class: Amphibia
- Order: Anura
- Family: Bufonidae
- Genus: Rhinella
- Species: R. dapsilis

Binomial name
- Rhinella dapsilis (Myers and A. L. Carvalho, 1945)

Synonyms
- Bufo dapsilis Myers and Carvalho, 1945

= Rhinella dapsilis =

Species of amphibian

Rhinella dapsilis is a species of toad in the family Bufonidae. It is found in Brazil, Colombia, Ecuador, and Peru. Its natural habitats are subtropical or tropical moist lowland forests, rivers, freshwater marshes, and intermittent freshwater marshes.
