= Colobosauroides cearensis =

Scientific classification
- Domain: Eukaryota
- Kingdom: Animalia
- Phylum: Chordata
- Class: Reptilia
- Order: Squamata
- Family: Gymnophthalmidae
- Genus: Colobosauroides
- Species: C. cearensis

Binomial name
- Colobosauroides cearensis Cunha, Lima-Verde, & Lima, 1991

Species of lizard

Colobosauroides cearensis is a species of lizard in the family Gymnophthalmidae. It is endemic to Northeast Brazil. The species lives in leaf litter. Males are larger than females.
