= Hypostomus carvalhoi =

Scientific classification
- Kingdom: Animalia
- Phylum: Chordata
- Class: Actinopterygii
- Division: Teleostei
- Order: Siluriformes
- Family: Loricariidae
- Genus: Hypostomus
- Species: H. carvalhoi

Binomial name
- Hypostomus carvalhoi (A. Miranda-Ribeiro, 1937)

Synonyms
- Plecostomus carvalhoi

Species of fish

Hypostomus carvalhoi is a species of catfish in the family Loricariidae. It is native to South America, where it occurs in the Jaguaribe River basin. The species reaches 14.2 cm (5.6 inches) SL and is believed to be a facultative air-breather.

== Etymology ==
The fish is named in honor of Brazilian ichthyologist-herpetologist Antenor Leitão de Carvalho (1910–1985), who collected the holotype of this species.
