= Colobosauroides =

Scientific classification
- Kingdom: Animalia
- Phylum: Chordata
- Class: Reptilia
- Order: Squamata
- Family: Gymnophthalmidae
- Tribe: Ecpleopodini
- Genus: Colobosauroides da Cunha, Lima-Verde & Lima, 1991

Genus of lizards

Colobosauroides is a small genus of lizards in the family Gymnophthalmidae. The genus Colobosauroides is endemic to Brazil.

== Geographic range ==
Species in the genus Colobosauroides are found in northeastern Brazil, in the Brazilian states of Bahia and Ceará.

== Species ==
The genus Colobosauroides includes only the following two species:

- Colobosauroides carvalhoi M. Soares & Caramaschi, 1998
- Colobosauroides cearensis da Cunha, Lima-Verde & Lima, 1991

== Etymology ==
The specific name, carvalhoi, is in honor of Brazilian herpetologist Antenor Leitão de Carvalho.
