= Harttia carvalhoi =

Conservation status
- Least Concern (IUCN 3.1)

Scientific classification
- Kingdom: Animalia
- Phylum: Chordata
- Class: Actinopterygii
- Order: Siluriformes
- Family: Loricariidae
- Genus: Harttia
- Species: H. carvalhoi

Binomial name
- Harttia carvalhoi P. Miranda-Ribeiro, 1939

Species of fish

Harttia carvalhoi is a species of freshwater ray-finned fish belonging to the family Loricariidae, the suckermouth armored catfishes, and the subfamily Loricariinae, the mailed catfishes. This catfish is endemic to southeastern Brazil where it is found in the Paraíba do Sul drainage basin. This species attains a maximum standard length of 7.1 cm (2.8 in).

Harttia carvalhoi has the specific name, carvalhoi, which honors the collector of the holotype, the Brazilian herpetologist and ichthyologist Antenor Leitão de Carvalho.
