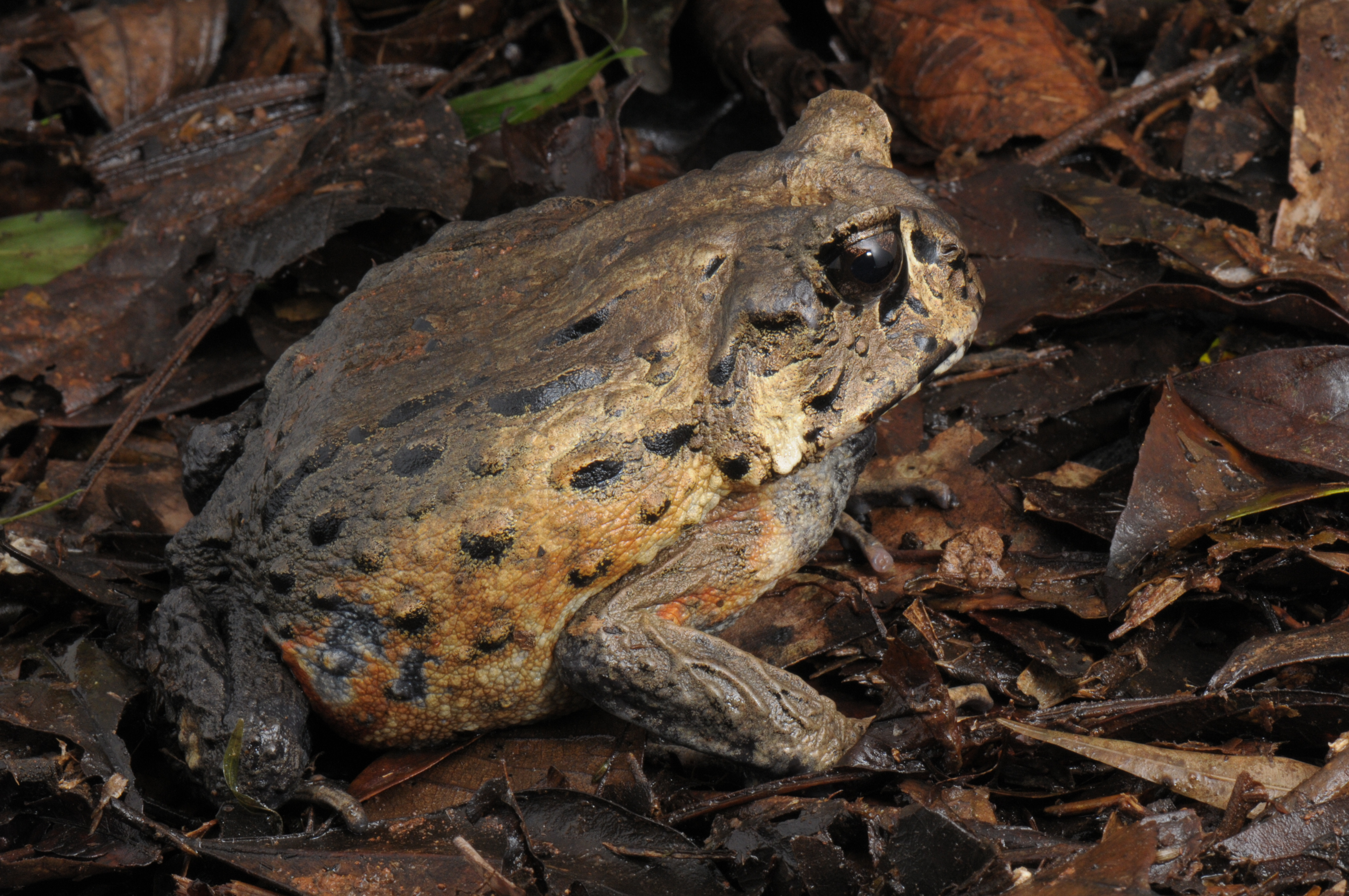

Conservation status
- Least Concern (IUCN 3.1)

Scientific classification
- Kingdom: Animalia
- Phylum: Chordata
- Class: Amphibia
- Order: Anura
- Family: Odontophrynidae
- Genus: Odontophrynus (Carvalho, 1946)
- Species: O. alipioi

Binomial name
- Odontophrynus alipioi Carvalho, 1946

Synonyms
- Macrogenioglottus alipioi Carvalho, 1946

= Odontophrynus alipioi =

Bahia forest frog

Genus of amphibians

The Bahia forest frog is a species of frog in the family Odontophrynidae. It has been given the scientific name Odontophrynus alipioi and was once considered the only species in the genus Macrogenioglottus. It is endemic to Brazil.

== Habitat ==
This burrowing frog has been observed in both primary and longstanding secondary forest. Its natural habitats are primary and old secondary forests, but it can also live in well shaded agroforestry systems such as cacao plantations. Scientists saw the frog between 0 and 600 meters above sea level. It has been reported in many protected parks.

== Reproduction ==
This frog is an explosive breeder, reproducing after heavy rains.

== Threats ==
The IUCN classifies this species as least concern of extinction. What threat it faces comes from habitat loss by conversion of forest to agriculture, tree farms, cities, and livestock grazing areas. Scientists think that shaded cacao farms do not pose a danger to the frog.
