= Amphisbaena cunhai =

Conservation status
- Least Concern (IUCN 3.1)

Scientific classification
- Kingdom: Animalia
- Phylum: Chordata
- Class: Reptilia
- Order: Squamata
- Clade: Amphisbaenia
- Family: Amphisbaenidae
- Genus: Amphisbaena
- Species: A. cunhai

Binomial name
- Amphisbaena cunhai Hoogmoed & Ávila-Pires, 1991

Species of amphisbaenian

Amphisbaena cunhai is a species of amphisbaenian in the family Amphisbaenidae. The species is endemic to Brazil.

== Etymology ==
The specific name, cunhai, is in honor of Brazilian herpetologist Osvaldo Rodrigues da Cunha.

== Geographic range ==
A. cunhai is found in the Brazilian states of Amazonas and Rondônia.

== Habitat ==
The preferred natural habitat of A. cunhai is forest, but it is also found in cultivated areas that were previously forest.

== Behavior ==
A. cunhai is terrestrial and fossorial.

== Reproduction ==
A. cunhai is oviparous.
