= Emilie Snethlage =

Brazilian naturalist and ornithologist

Henriette Mathilde Maria Elizabeth Emilie (Mila) Snethlage
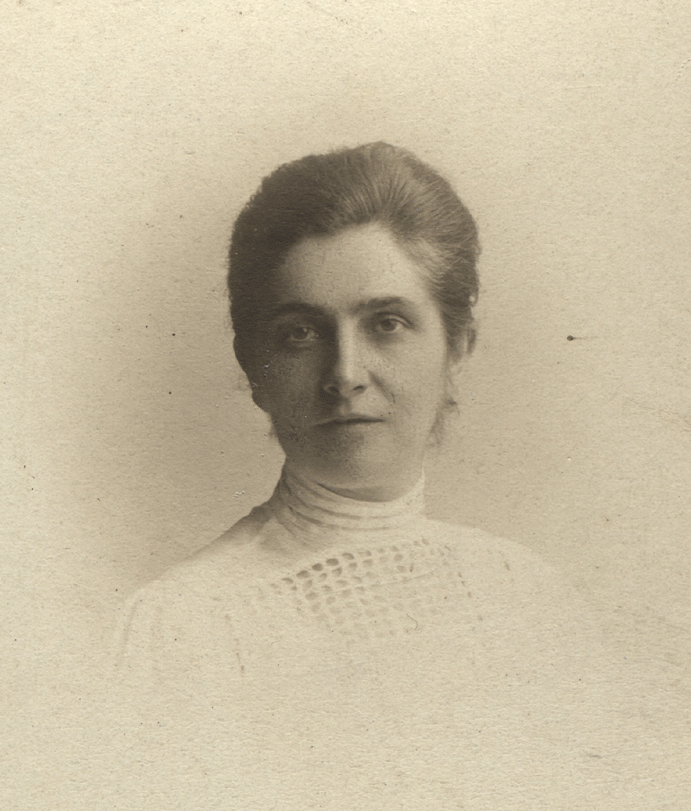
- Born: April 13, 1868; Gransee-Kraaz, Province of Brandenburg, Kingdom of Prussia
- Died: November 25, 1929 (aged 61); Porto Velho, Rondônia, Brazil
- Citizenship: Brazilian
- Education: Albert Ludwig University of Freiburg in Breisgau
- Known for: Amazonian ornithology
- Awards: Brazilian Academy of Sciences
- Scientific career
- Fields: Ornithology
- Workplaces: Museu Paraense Emílio Goeldi
- Doctoral advisor: August Weismann

Notes
- This remarkable woman opened science as a profession for Brazilian women.

Maria Emilie Snethlage (April 13, 1868 – November 25, 1929) was a German-born Brazilian naturalist and ornithologist who worked on the bird fauna of the Amazon. Snethlage collected in Brazil from 1905 until her death. She was the director of the Museu Paraense Emílio Goeldi from 1914 to 1922. Several species of birds were described by her.

== Early life ==
Maria Emilie Snethlage was born in Kraatz (now part of Gransee) in the Province of Brandenburg, Prussia, and educated privately by her father Rev. Emil Snethlage, a Lutheran pastor, after the death of her mother. In 1889 she passed an examination that allowed her to teach young women at secondary school. At the age of 21 she studied French at Neuchatel and worked for a few years as a tutor in England, Ireland and Germany. She became interested in nature at an early age through the book Entdeckungsreisen in Feld und Flur by Hermann Wagner and she collected plants for a herbarium apart from sending notes on birds to Rudolf Blasius at a young age. In 1899, at the age of 30 she decided to study natural history at the University of Berlin. The conditions for her at attend university included the need to be in class five minutes before time and sit behind a folding screen. She was not to ask any questions during class and had to leave the premises only fifteen minutes after the end of the class. Snethlage was one of the pioneer women to attend university and she continued her studies in Jena and Freiburg, obtaining a doctorate in 1904, summa cum laude. Her thesis work was on insect musculature with August Weismann as thesis advisor. She then worked as a zoological assistant at the Berlin Natural History Museum before being hired by Emílio Goeldi for the natural history museum in Belém on the recommendation of Dr. A. Reichenow. Goeldi had worked since 1894 to head the Museo Paraense and when the Swiss zoologist Gottfried Hagmann (1874-1946) left the museum after disagreements with Goeldi, the vacancy was filled by Snethlage in 1905.

== Brazil ==
Snethlage's work in the Brazilian Amazon took her to Acre and other remote places on collecting expeditions. She became the director of the Museu Paraense Emílio Goeldi, after the death of botanist Jacques Hüber, between 1914 and 1922. She wrote the Catálogo das Aves Amazônicas (1914). Snethlage was granted honorary membership in the British Ornithologists' Union in 1915. In 1921 she went to the National Museum in Rio de Janeiro, as "naturalista viajante." She continued her studies of the Brazilian avifauna with field trips to Minas Gerais, Maranhão, Ceará, Espírito Santo, Santa Catarina, Paraná, São Paulo state, and the Brazilian Amazon. On an expedition on the Curua, the main tributary of the Iriri in 1914 she was in a boat with her hand in the water when a piranha bit her. The cut became infected and she was forced to amputate, by herself, the middle finger of her right hand with a machete.

She died of heart failure in Porto Velho, Rondônia, and was buried at the cemetery of inocentes while on a field trip. In her last letter, written shortly before she died, Snethlage mentions meeting the English butterfly collector Margaret Fountaine.

Her nephew was the ethnologist Dr. Emil Heinrich Snethlage.

== Legacy ==
Snethlage's tody-tyrant, Hemitriccus minor, was described as a new species by her, while the Madeira parakeet, Pyrrhura snethlageae, described as new to science in 2002, was named in her honour.

Snethlage is also commemorated in the common and scientific names of the Emilia's marmoset (Mico emiliae), also known as Snethlage's marmoset, and the scientific names of two species of South American reptiles: Atractus snethlageae, a snake; and Loxopholis snethlageae, a gymnophthalmid lizard.

== Publications (partial list) ==
- Snethlage, E. 1905 - Ueber die Frage vom Muskelansatz und der Herkunft der Muskulatur bei den Arthropoden. Zoologische Jahrbücher. Bd. 21. Abteilung für Anatomie
- ————— 1906 - Ueber brasilianische Voegel. Ornithologische Monatsberichte, 14:9.
- ————— 1906 - Einige Bemerkungen ueber Ypocnemis vidua Hellm. und Phlogopsis paraensis Hellm. Ornithologische Monatsberichte, 14:9-31.
- ————— 1906 - Ein neuer Zwergspecht. Ornithologische Monatsberichte, 14:59-60.
- ————— 1906 - Ueber unteramazonische Voegel. Journal für Ornithologie, 1906:407-411, 519-527; 1907:283-299.
- ————— 1907 - Neue Vogelarten aus Südamerika. Ornithologische Monatsberichte, 15:160-164, 193-196.
- ————— 1908 - Eine Vogelsammlung vom Purus, Brasilien. Journal für Ornithologie, 1908:7-24.
- ————— 1908 - Ornithologisches von Tapajoz und Tocantins. Journal für Ornithologie, 1908:493-539.
- ————— 1908 - Sobre uma collecção de aves do Rio Purus. Bol. Museu Goeldi, 5:43-78.
- ————— 1908 - Novas espécies de aves amazônicas das collecções do Museu Goeldi. Bol. Museu Goeldi, 5:437-448.
- ————— 1908 - Novas espécies de peixes amazônicos das collecções do Museu Goeldi. Bol. Museu Goeldi, 5:449-455.
- ————— 1908 - Bibliographia zoologica. Bol. Museu Goeldi, 5:463-47l.
- ————— 1909 - Sobre a distribuição da avifauna campestre na Amazônia. Bol. Museu Goeldi, 6:226-235.
- ————— 1909 - Berichtigung. Orn. Monatsberichte, 18:192.
- ————— 1910 - Zur Ethnographie der Chipaya und Curuahé. Zeitschrift für Ethnologie, : 612-637.
- ————— 1910 - Neue Vogelarten aus Amazonien. Ornithologische Monatsberichte, 20:153- 155.
- ————— 1912 - A travessia entre o Xingu e o Tapajoz. Bol. Museu Goeldi, 7:49-92.
- ————— 1912 - Vocabulario comparativo dos Indios Chipayas e Curuahé. Bol. Museu Goeldi, 12:93-99.
- ————— 1913 - A travessia entre o Xingú e o Tapajoz . Pará, Brazil: E. Lohse & Cia.
- ————— 1913 - Ueber die Verbreitung der Vogelarten in Unteramazonien. Journal für Ornithologie, 1913: 469-539.
- ————— 1914 - Neue Vogelarten aus Amazonien. Ornithologische Monatsberichte, 22:39-44.
- ————— 1914 - Catálogo das Aves Amazônicas. Boletim do Museu Paraense Emílio Goeldi de Historia Natural e Etnografia, 8: 1-530.
- ————— 1917 - Nature and Man in Eastern Pará, Brazil. The Geographical Review (New York), 4(1): 41-50.
- ————— 1920-1921 - Die Indianerstaemme am mittleren Xingu. Zeitschrift für Ethnologie, :395-427.
- ————— 1923 - Oribatídeos Brasileiros (Uebersetzung der Arbeit, von Dr. Max Sellnick). Archivos Mus. Nacional, 24:283-300.
- ————— 1924 - Neue Vogelarten aus Nordbrasilien. Journal für Ornithologie, 446-450.
- ————— 1924 - Informações sobre a avifauna do Maranhão, Bol. Mus. Nacional, 1: 219-223.
- ————— 1924 - Novas especies de aves do NE do Brasil. Bol. Mus. Nacional, :407-412.
- ————— 1925 - Neue Vogelarten aus Nordbrasilien. Journal für Ornithologie, 73:264-274.
- ————— 1925 - Die Flüsse Iriri und Curuá im Gebiete des Xingu. Zeitschrift der Gesellschaft für Erdkunde zu Berlin, : 328-354.
- ————— 1925 - Resumo de trabalhos executados na Europa de 1924-1925. Bol. Mus. Nacional, 2 (6): 35-70.
- ————— 1926 - Uma nova espécie de Dendrocolaptídeo no interior do Brasil. Bol. Mus. Nacional, 3(3): 59-60.
- ————— 1926 - Algumas observações sobre pássaros raros e pouco conhecidos do Brasil, Bol. Mus. Nacional, 3(3): 61-64.
- ————— 1927 - Bemerkungen ueber einige wenig bekannte Formicariiden aus Süd- und Mittelbrasilien. Journal für Ornithologie, :371-374.
- ————— 1927 - Ein neuer Cuculidae aus Südbrasilien. Ornithologische Monatsberichte, 35(3): 80-82.
- ————— 1928 - Novas espécies e subespécies de aves do Brasil Central. Bol. Mus. Nac., 4(2): 1-7.

Sources:

- Cunha, Oswaldo Rodrigues (1989) Talento e Atitude. Belém, Brazil: Museu Paraense Emílio Goeldi.
- Archives of the Museu Paraense Emílio Goeldi, Belém, Brazil.
