= Atractus alphonsehogei =

Conservation status
- Least Concern (IUCN 3.1)

Scientific classification
- Kingdom: Animalia
- Phylum: Chordata
- Class: Reptilia
- Order: Squamata
- Suborder: Serpentes
- Family: Colubridae
- Genus: Atractus
- Species: A. alphonsehogei

Binomial name
- Atractus alphonsehogei Cunha & Nascimento, 1983

Species of snake

Atractus alphonsehogei, also known commonly as Alphonse's ground snake, is a species of snake in the subfamily Dipsadinae of the family Colubridae. The species is endemic to Brazil.

== Etymology ==
The specific name, alphonsehogei, is in honor of Brazilian-born Belgian herpetologist Alphonse Richard Hoge.

== Geographic range ==
Atractus alphonsehogei is found in northern Brazil, in the Brazilian states of Amazonas, Maranhão, Pará, and Roraima.

== Habitat ==
The preferred natural habitat of Atractus alphonsehogei is forest.

== Description ==
Atractus alphonsehogei may attain a snout-to-vent length of about 28 cm (11 in) in females, and about 22 cm (8.7 in) in males. Dorsally, it is brown to grayish black, with a cream-colored incomplete occipital collar. Ventrally, it is cream-colored, with a dark line running down each side of the belly, near the ends of the ventrals. Each smooth dorsal scale has one, or rarely two, apical pits. The dorsal scales are arranged in 17 rows throughout the whole length of the body (17/17/17). Mature males have tubercles in the cloacal region.

== Behavior ==
Atractus alphonsehogei is terrestrial and fossorial.

== Diet ==
Atractus alphonsehogei preys predominately upon earthworms.

== Reproduction ==
Atractus alphonsehogei is oviparous.
