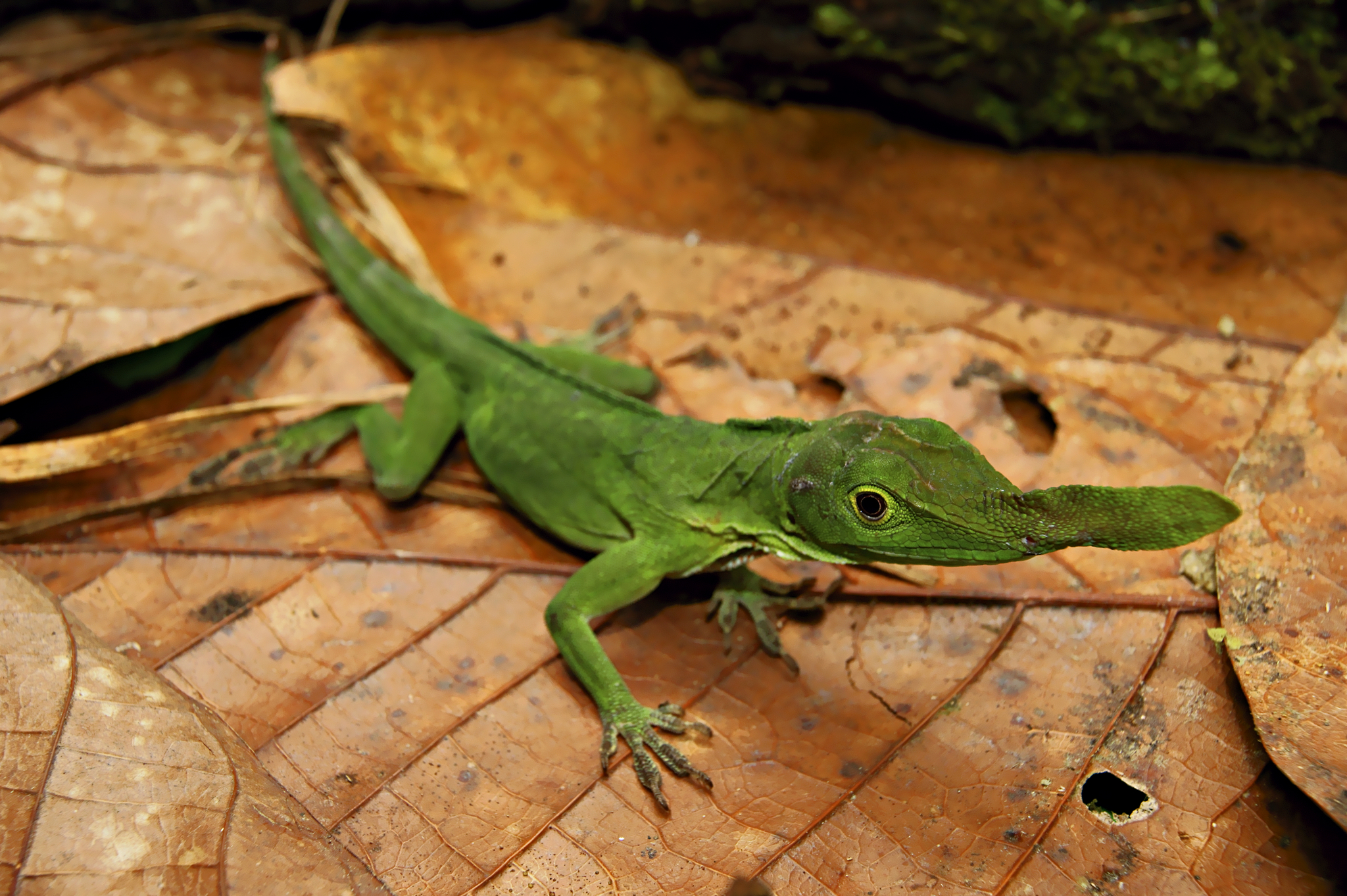

Conservation status
- Least Concern (IUCN 3.1)

Scientific classification
- Kingdom: Animalia
- Phylum: Chordata
- Class: Reptilia
- Order: Squamata
- Suborder: Iguania
- Family: Dactyloidae
- Genus: Anolis
- Species: A. phyllorhinus

Binomial name
- Anolis phyllorhinus Myers & A. L. Carvalho, 1945

= Anolis phyllorhinus =

Species of lizard

Anolis phyllorhinus, the leaf-nosed anole or bat anole, is a species of lizard in the family Dactyloidae. The species is found in Brazil.
