= Osvaldo Rodrigues da Cunha =

Brazilian paleontologist and herpetologist (1928–2011)

- Born: April 6, 1928; Belém, Brazil
- Died: March 11, 2011 (aged 82); Belém
- Education: Instituto Nacional de Pesquisas da Amazônia (INPA)
- Scientific career
- Fields: Zoology paleontology Herpetology
- Workplaces: Museu Paraense Emílio Goeldi

Osvaldo Rodrigues da Cunha (6 April 1928 – 11 March 2011) was a Brazilian paleontologist and herpetologist. Da Cunha was born in Belém, and studied zoology at the Instituto Nacional de Pesquisas da Amazônia (INPA) of Manaus.

== Selected works ==
- Cunha, O.R. (1958). "Lacertílios da Amazônia. I. Sobre a ocorrência do gênero Bachia Gray, 1845, na Amazônia Brasileira (Lacertilia-Teiidae)". Boletim do Museu Paraense Emílio Goeldi. Nova Série. Zoologia (11). ISSN 0077-2232. (in Portuguese).
- Cunha, O.R. (1961). "II. Lagartos da Amazônia. Os Lagartos da Amazônia Brasileira, com especial referência aos representados na coleção do Museu Goeldi ". Bol. Mus. Para. Emílio Goeldi. Zool. (39): 189.
- Cunha, O.R. (1966). "Sobre uma nova espécie de lagarto do Estado de Minas Gerais Placosoma cipoense, sp. nov. (Lacertilia, Teiidae)". Bol. Mus. Para. Emílio Goeldi. Zool. (61): 9.
- Cunha, O.R. (1967). "Ofidios da Amazônia I – A ocorrência de Bothrops bilineatus bilineatus (Wied) nas matas dos arredores de Belém, Pará (Ophidia, Crotalidae)". Bol. Mus. Para. Emílio Goeldi. Zoologia (66): 9.
- Cunha, O.R. (1968). "Um Teratodimo Derodimo em Jiboia (Constrictor (Linnaeus, 1766)). (Ophidia: Boidae)". Bol. Mus. Para. Emílio Goeldi. Zool. (67).
- Cunha, O.R.; Nascimento, F.P. (1970). "Ofídios da Amazônia II – Liophis miliaris (Linnaeus, 1758) na Amazônia Norte oriental (Território Federal do Amapá) (Ophidia, Colubridae)". Bol. Mus. Para. Emílio Goeldi. Zool. (70).
- Cunha, O.R. (1970). "Uma nova sub-espécie de quilônio, Kinosternon scorpioides carajasensis da Serra dos Carajás, Pará (Testudinata-Kinosternidae)". Bol. Mus. Para. Emílio Goeldi. Zool. (73).
- Cunha, O.R. (1970). "Lacertílios da Amazônia IV – Um novo gênero e espécie de lagarto do Território federal do Amapá (Lacertilia-Teiidae)". Bol. Mus. Para. Emílio Goeldi. Zool. (74).
- Cunha, O.R.; Nascimento, F.P. (1980). "Ofídios da Amazônia XI – Ofídios de Roraima e notas sobre Erythrolamprus bauperthuisii Duméril, Bibron & Duméril, 1854, sinônimo de Erythrolamprus aesculapii aesculapii (Linnaeus, 1758)". Bol. Mus. Para. Emílio Goeldi. Zool. (102).
- Cunha, O.R. (1981). "Lacertilios da Amazônia VIII – Sobre Ophryessoides tricristatus Duméril, 1851, com redescrição da espécie e notas sobre ecologia e distribuição na região leste do Pará (Lacertilia, Iguanidae)". Bol. Mus. Para. Emílio Goeldi. Zool. (108).
- Cunha, O.R.; Nascimento, F.P. (1982). "Ofídios da Amazônia Oriental (Ophidia: Colubridae). Nota prévia.". Bol. Mus. Para. Emílio Goeldi. Zool. (119).
- Cunha, O.R.; Nascimento, F.P. (1983). "Ofídios da Amazônia XIX – As espécies de Oxyrhopus Wagler, com uma subespécie nova, e Pseudoboa Schneider na Amazônia Oriental e Maranhão". Bol. Mus. Para. Emílio Goeldi. Zool. (122).
- Cunha, O.R.; Nascimento, F.P. (1983). "Ofídios da Amazônia. XX – As espécies de Atractus Wagler, 1928, na Amazônia Oriental e Maranhão". Bol. Mus. Para. Emílio Goeldi. Zool. (123).
- Cunha, O.R.; Lima-Verde J.S.; Lima A.C.M. (1991). "Novo genero e especie de lagarto do Estado do Ceara (Lacertilia: Teiidae)". Bol. Mus. Para. Emílio Goeldi. Zool. 7 (2): 163–176.

== Authored taxa ==
- Amapasaurus tetradactylus Cunha 1970
- Atractus albuquerquei Cunha & Nascimento, 1983
- Atractus alphonsehogei Cunha & Nascimento, 1983
- Atractus snethlageae Cunha & Nascimento, 1983
- Colobosauroides cearensis Cunha, Lima-Verde & Lima, 1991
- Gonatodes eladioi Nascimento, Ávila-Pires & Cunha, 1987
- Kinosternon scorpioides carajasensis Cunha 1970
- Liophis carajasensis Cunha, Nascimento & Ávila-Pires, 1985
- Micrurus paraensis Cunha & Nascimento, 1973
- Oxyrhopus melanogenys orientalis Cunha & Nascimento, 1983
- Placosoma cipoense Cunha, 1966

== Eponyms ==
Cunha is commemorated in the scientific names of two species of reptiles: Amphisbaena cunhai Hoogmoed & Ávila-Pires, 1991, a species of worm lizard; and Loxopholis osvaldoi Ávila-Pires, 1995, a species of spectacled lizard.
