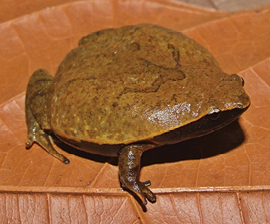
- Specimen from the Serra Bonita Private Reserve of Natural Heritage

Conservation status
- Data Deficient (IUCN 3.1)

Scientific classification
- Kingdom: Animalia
- Phylum: Chordata
- Class: Amphibia
- Order: Anura
- Family: Microhylidae
- Genus: Stereocyclops
- Species: S. histrio

Binomial name
- Stereocyclops histrio (A. L. Carvalho, 1954)

Synonyms
- Hyophryne histrio Carvalho, 1954

= Stereocyclops histrio =

Species of amphibian

Stereocyclops histrio is a species of frog in the family Microhylidae. It is endemic to the northeastern Bahia state of Brazil where it occurs in remnants of the Atlantic forest. After the holotype was collected in 1944, the species went unrecorded until a population was found in the Una Biological Reserve and its surroundings in 1999. It is now known from four locations. Common name Bahia yellow frog has been coined for it, perhaps in reference to the bright lemon yellow coloration of the holotype. It was the only species in the genus Hyophryne until 2012 when molecular data demonstrated that it is nested within Stereocyclops species.

== Description ==
Males measure 24–39 mm (0.9–1.5 in) and females 25–43 mm (1.0–1.7 in) in snout–vent length (SVL). The body is oval, and the head is wider than it is long, truncate in dorsal view and slightly protruding laterally. The eyes are small and the tympanum is indistinct. The fingers are short, robust, and without webbing. The toes are fringed and have webbing. Dorsal coloration is variable, yellow-lime, yellow, orange, green, beige or dark-brown. The venter is dark and has white rounded or elongated blotches. The iris is silver dorsally and black ventrally. The body surface is smooth; however, males larger than about 28 mm (1.1 in) SVL have dermal spines that in extreme cases cover the entire body. only gravid females have dermal spines in the pericloacal region.

Two females, both measuring 42 mm (1.7 in) SVL, contained 590 and 1190 ovarian eggs measuring 1.3–1.5 mm (0.05–0.06 in) in diameter.

== Habitat and conservation ==
Its habitat is primary and secondary forest. Presumably it is an explosive breeder. It is locally abundant in the Una Biological Reserve, where it was inhabiting primary forest as well as the surrounding forest fragments, secondary forest, and cacao groves. It has also been recorded in the Serra Bonita Private Reserve of Natural Heritage. It is threatened by habitat loss.
