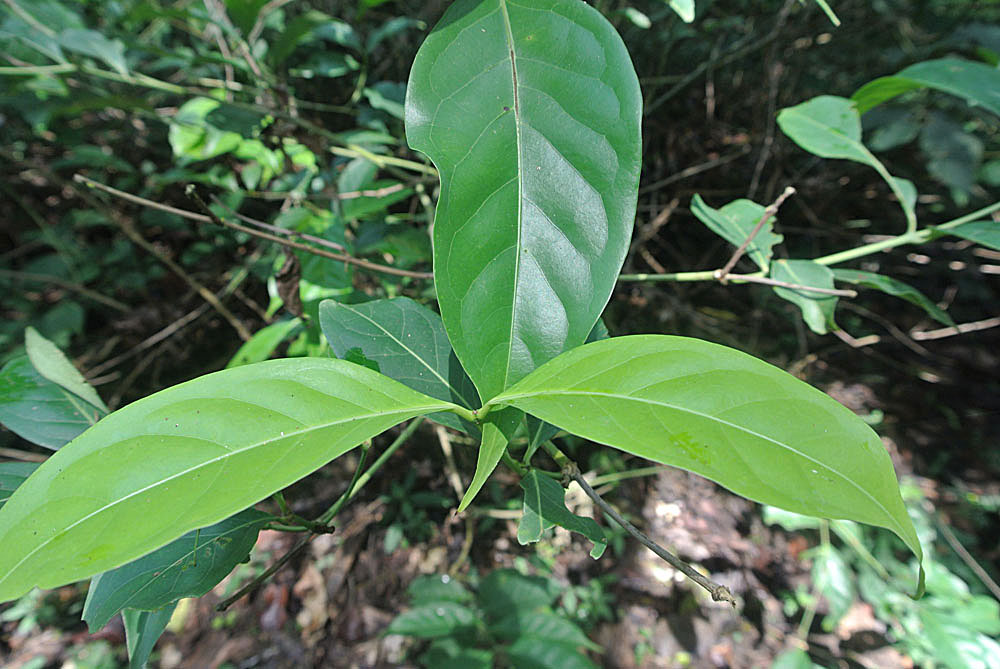
- Diplopterys cabrerana

Scientific classification
- Kingdom: Plantae
- Clade: Tracheophytes
- Clade: Angiosperms
- Clade: Eudicots
- Clade: Rosids
- Order: Malpighiales
- Family: Malpighiaceae
- Genus: Diplopterys; A.Juss.

Synonyms
- Jubistylis Rusby

= Diplopterys =

Genus of flowering plants

Diplopterys is a genus of flowering plants in the family Malpighiaceae. It includes 31 species native to the tropical Americas, ranging from Mexico to southern Brazil and northwestern Argentina.

== Species ==
31 species are accepted.

- Diplopterys amplectens (B.Gates) W.R.Anderson & C.Davis
- Diplopterys bahiana W.R.Anderson & C.Davis
- Diplopterys cabrerana (Cuatrec.) B.Gates
- Diplopterys cachimbensis (B.Gates) W.R.Anderson & C.Davis
- Diplopterys caduciflora (Nied.) W.R.Anderson & C.Davis
- Diplopterys carvalhoi W.R.Anderson & C.Davis
- Diplopterys cristata (Griseb.) W.R.Anderson & C.Davis
- Diplopterys cururuensis B.Gates
- Diplopterys erianthera (A.Juss.) W.R.Anderson & C.Davis
- Diplopterys heterostyla (A.Juss.) W.R.Anderson & C.Davis
- Diplopterys hypericifolia (A.Juss.) W.R.Anderson & C.Davis
- Diplopterys krukoffii (B.Gates) W.R.Anderson & C.Davis
- Diplopterys leiocarpa (A.Juss.) W.R.Anderson & C.Davis
- Diplopterys longialata (Nied.) W.R.Anderson & C.Davis
- Diplopterys lucida (Rich.) W.R.Anderson & C.Davis
- Diplopterys lutea (Rich.) W.R.Anderson & C.Davis
- Diplopterys mexicana B.Gates
- Diplopterys nigrescens (A.Juss.) W.R.Anderson & C.Davis
- Diplopterys nutans (Nied.) W.R.Anderson & C.Davis
- Diplopterys patula (B.Gates) W.R.Anderson & C.Davis
- Diplopterys pauciflora (G.Mey.) Nied.
- Diplopterys peruviana (Nied.) W.R.Anderson & C.Davis
- Diplopterys platyptera (Griseb.) W.R.Anderson & C.Davis
- Diplopterys populifolia (Nied.) W.R.Anderson & C.Davis
- Diplopterys pubipetala (A.Juss.) W.R.Anderson & C.Davis
- Diplopterys rondoniensis (B.Gates) W.R.Anderson & C.Davis
- Diplopterys schunkei (B.Gates) W.R.Anderson & C.Davis
- Diplopterys sepium (A.Juss.) W.R.Anderson & C.Davis
- Diplopterys valvata (Mart. ex A.Juss.) W.R.Anderson & C.Davis
- Diplopterys virgultosa (Mart. ex A.Juss.) W.R.Anderson & C.Davis
- Diplopterys woytkowskii (B.Gates) W.R.Anderson & C.Davis
