= Colobosauroides carvalhoi =

Conservation status
- Data Deficient (IUCN 3.1)

Scientific classification
- Kingdom: Animalia
- Phylum: Chordata
- Class: Reptilia
- Order: Squamata
- Family: Gymnophthalmidae
- Genus: Colobosauroides
- Species: C. carvalhoi

Binomial name
- Colobosauroides carvalhoi Soares & Caramaschi, 1998

Species of lizard

Colobosauroides carvalhoi is a species of lizard in the family Gymnophthalmidae. The species is native to Northeast Region, Brazil.

== Etymology ==
The specific name, carvalhoi, is in honor of Brazilian herpetologist Antenor Leitão de Carvalho.

== Geographic range ==
C. carvalhoi is found in the Brazilian states of Bahia and Piauí. The distribution of C. carvalhoi is structured within the southern canyons, with a marked reduction in abundance from the base of rock cliffs through the central portion of the valleys.

== Habitat ==
The preferred natural habitat of C. carvalhoi is savanna.

== Description ==
Adults of C. carvalhoi have an average snout-to-vent length (SVL) of 12 cm (4.7 in), with a tail slightly longer than SVL.

== Reproduction ==
C. carvalhoi is oviparous.
