= Cycloramphus carvalhoi =

Conservation status
- Least Concern (IUCN 3.1)

Scientific classification
- Kingdom: Animalia
- Phylum: Chordata
- Class: Amphibia
- Order: Anura
- Family: Cycloramphidae
- Genus: Cycloramphus
- Species: C. carvalhoi

Binomial name
- Cycloramphus carvalhoi (Izecksohn, 1983)

Synonyms
- Zachaenus carvalhoi Izecksohn, 1983

Species of frog

Cycloramphus carvalhoi is a species of frog in the family Cycloramphidae. It is endemic to southeastern Brazil and is known from the southern Espírito Santo and adjacent Minas Gerais.

This species inhabits leaf litter in the Atlantic rainforest biome. Males can be heard calling during rainy weather.
