= Chiasmocleis carvalhoi =

Conservation status
- Least Concern (IUCN 3.1)

Scientific classification
- Kingdom: Animalia
- Phylum: Chordata
- Class: Amphibia
- Order: Anura
- Family: Microhylidae
- Genus: Chiasmocleis
- Species: C. carvalhoi

Binomial name
- Chiasmocleis carvalhoi (Nelson, 1975)

Synonyms
- Syncope carvalhoi Nelson, 1975

Species of frog

Chiasmocleis carvalhoi is a species of frog in the family Microhylidae. It is found in Colombia, Peru, and Brazil. Its natural habitats are subtropical or tropical dry forests or moist lowland forests and intermittent freshwater marshes. It is threatened by habitat loss from farming and logging.
