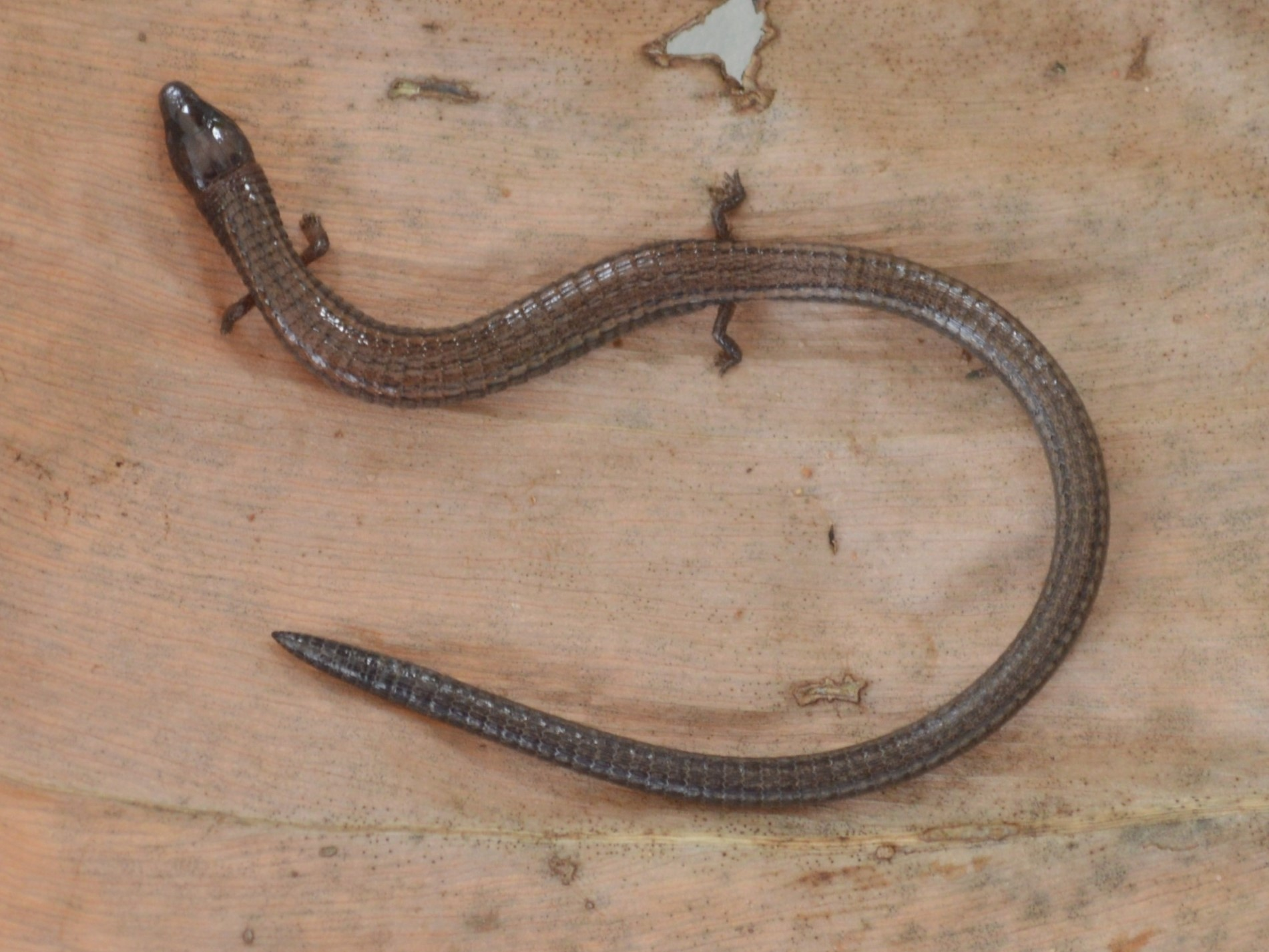

Conservation status
- Least Concern (IUCN 3.1)

Scientific classification
- Kingdom: Animalia
- Phylum: Chordata
- Class: Reptilia
- Order: Squamata
- Family: Gymnophthalmidae
- Genus: Bachia
- Species: B. trinitatis

Binomial name
- Bachia trinitatis (Barbour, 1914)

= Bachia trinitatis =

Species of lizard

Bachia trinitatis, commonly known as the Trinidad bachia, Trinidad worm lizard, or Trinidad hex-scaled bachia, is a species of lizard in the family Gymnophthalmidae. It is found in Trinidad and Tobago and Venezuela.

== Taxonomy ==
L. Fitzinger in 1826 described the species Brachypus cuvieri, which may refer to any four-toed Bachia species, and which has been suggested to be a senior synonym for Bachia trinitatis in the past. However, the holotype and type locality for cuvieri are now unknown, making it difficult to apply the name to a single species. Furthermore, a 1839 redescription of the species by André Duméril and Gabriel Bibron was based on three lectotypes belonging to three different species, leading to cuvieri generally being considered a nomen dubium or nomen nudum in the present.

Bachia trinitatis was formally described by the American herpetologist Thomas Barbour as Scolecosaurus trinitatis in 1914 on the basis of an adult specimen collected from Caparo, Trinidad. The Brazilian biologist Paulo Vanzolini moved it into the genus Bachia in 1961 and the R. Thomas further demoted it to a subspecies of Bachia alleni in 1965. Dixon in 1973 considered both alleni and trinitatis subspecies of Bachia heteropa, a taxonomic arrangement that was subsequently followed for the better part of 50 years. In 2019, it was raised back to full species status based on morphological and genetic data.

Bachia trinitatis seems to be most closely related to B. whitei and flavescens, having diverged from a clade formed by those two species around 26 million years ago.

== Description ==
Bachia trinitatis is generally dark brown in colour, marked with a striped and mottled pattern that gets duller wuth age. In adults, the back is tan, marked with dark brown speckles and a faint vertebral stripe that only becomes apparent on the tail. The underside is gray to tan in color, occasionally with dark brown mottling in bigger individuals. This mottling is darker than on the back and is concentrated near the throat, chest, and hip-bone regions. The sides are a gradient between the tan back and gray underside, marked with faint dorsolateral stripes that become darker on the tail. These stripes are edged with dark brown. Tails that have regenerated have no or broken stripes. Hatchlings and juveniles have much darker markings than adults, with heads that are darker than the rest of the body.

== Distribution and habitat ==
Bachia trinitatis is found in Trinidad and Tobago and Venezuela. In Trinidad and Tobago, it is known from the main islands, Little Tobago, and the islands of Chacachacare, Gaspar Grande, and Monos in the Bocas. In Venezuela, it is known to inhabit Margarita Island, where it has been recorded from the Macanao Peninsula and Paraguachoa. Bachia lizards from the Paria Peninsula on the Venezuelan mainland, in the state of Sucre, have also been tentatively identified as belonging to this species. It is known from elevations of up to 800 m.

== Ecology ==
It lays clutches of two eggs. The breeding season is drawn-out and may possibly last year-round. It has been recorded living alongside and utilizing the same nesting sites as Gonatodes species. It is known to feign death when threatened.

== Conservation ==
Bachia trinitatis is classified as being of least concern by the IUCN.
