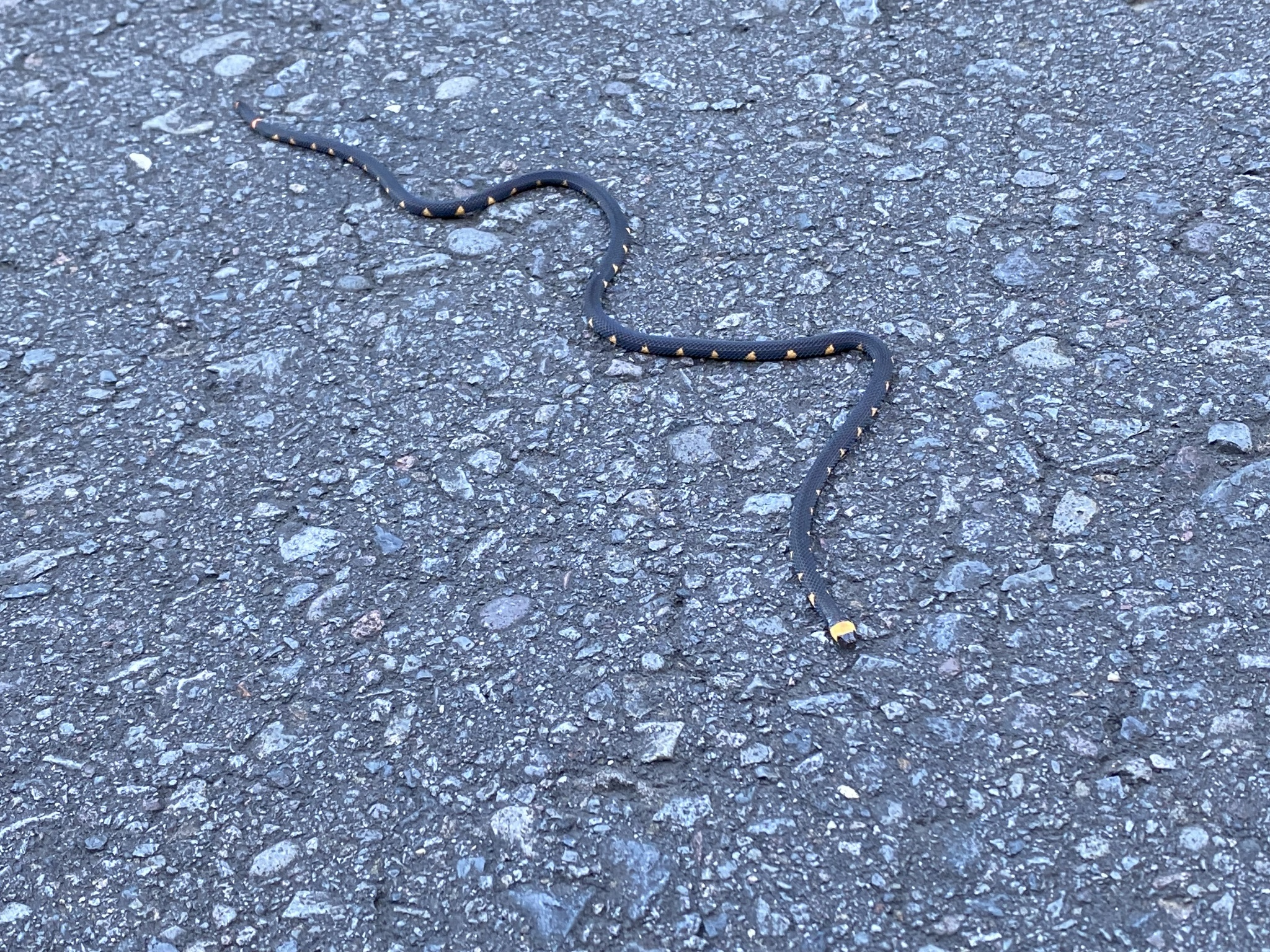

Conservation status
- Least Concern (IUCN 3.1)

Scientific classification
- Kingdom: Animalia
- Phylum: Chordata
- Class: Reptilia
- Order: Squamata
- Suborder: Serpentes
- Family: Elapidae
- Genus: Micrurus
- Species: M. narduccii

Binomial name
- Micrurus narduccii (Jan, 1863)
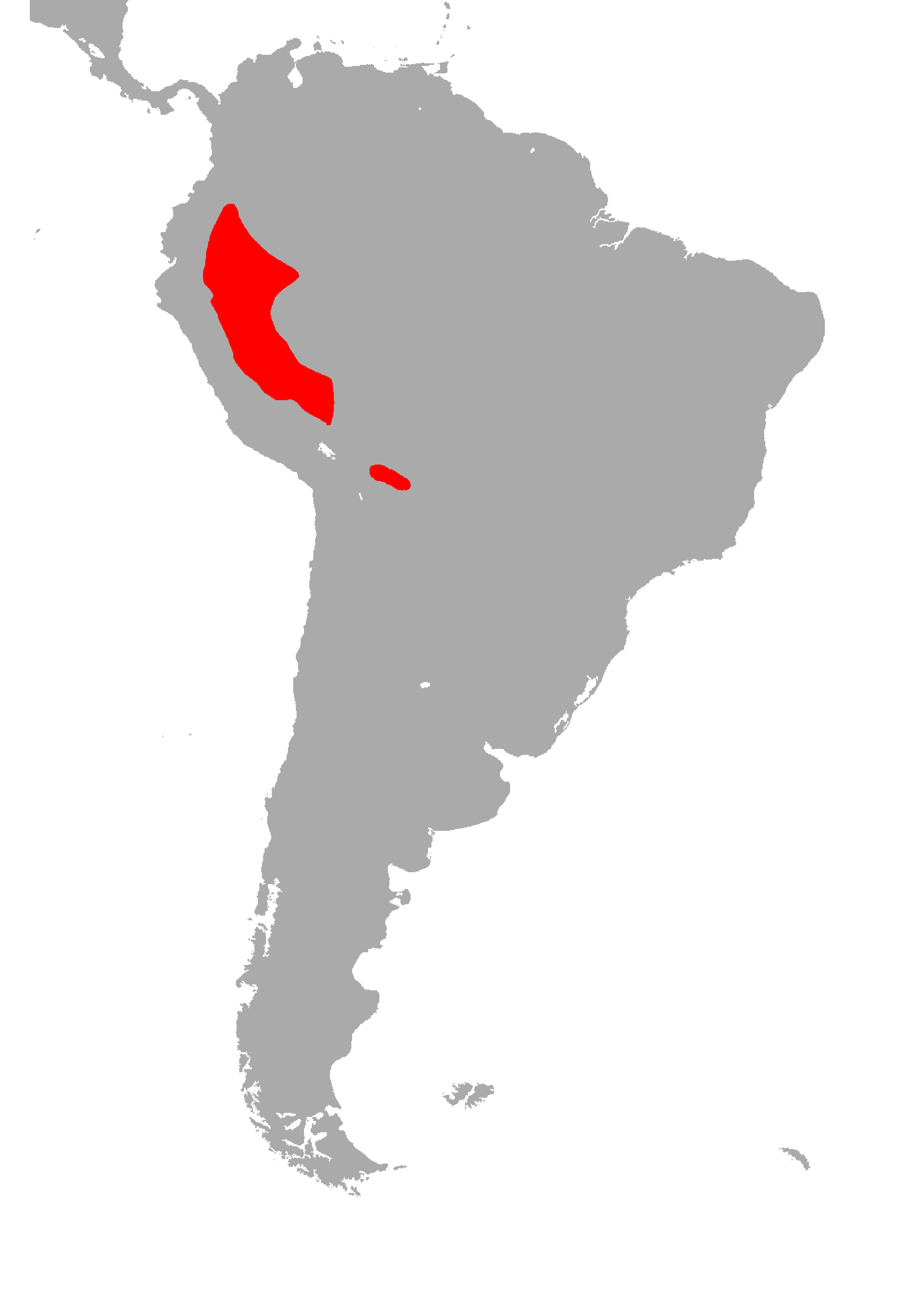

Synonyms
- Elaps narduccii Jan, 1863; Leptomicrurus narduccii (Jan, 1863); Elaps scutiventris Cope, 1870

= Micrurus narduccii =

Species of snake

Micrurus narduccii, also known commonly as the Andean blackback coral snake, the Andean black coral snake, and Jan's thread coral snake, is a species of venomous snake in the family Elapidae. The species is native to northwestern South America. There are two recognized subspecies.

== Etymology ==
The specific name, narduccii, is in honor of Italian-born Bolivian naturalist Louis Narducci.

== Description ==
Micrurus narduccii is medium to large for its genus, but slender. Adults usually have a total length (tail included) of 50–80 cm (20–31 in). The maximum recorded total length is 112 cm (44 in).

The dorsal scales are smooth, without apical pits, and arranged in 15 rows at midbody. The anal plate is divided, and the subcaudals are divided (paired). The venter is black, with yellow crossbands or transversely oval spots.

== Geographic distribution ==
Micrurus narduccii is found on the Amazonian slopes of the Andes, in southern Colombia, eastern Ecuador, northwestern Bolivia, northwestern Brazil, and eastern Peru.

== Habitat ==
The preferred natural habitat of Micrurus narduccii is forest, at elevations of 100–1,500 m (330–4,920 ft).

== Behavior ==
Micrurus narduccii is terrestrial and semifossorial, foraging in leaf litter and sheltering under fallen tree trunks.

== Diet ==
Micrurus narduccii preys on snakelike lizards of the family Gymnophthalmidae, especially Bachia dorbignyi and other species of the genus Bachia.

== Reproduction ==
Micrurus narduccii is oviparous.

== Subspecies ==
Two subspecies are recognized as being valid, including the nominotypical subspecies.

- Micrurus narduccii narduccii (Jan, 1863)
- Micrurus narduccii melanotus (W. Peters, 1881)
