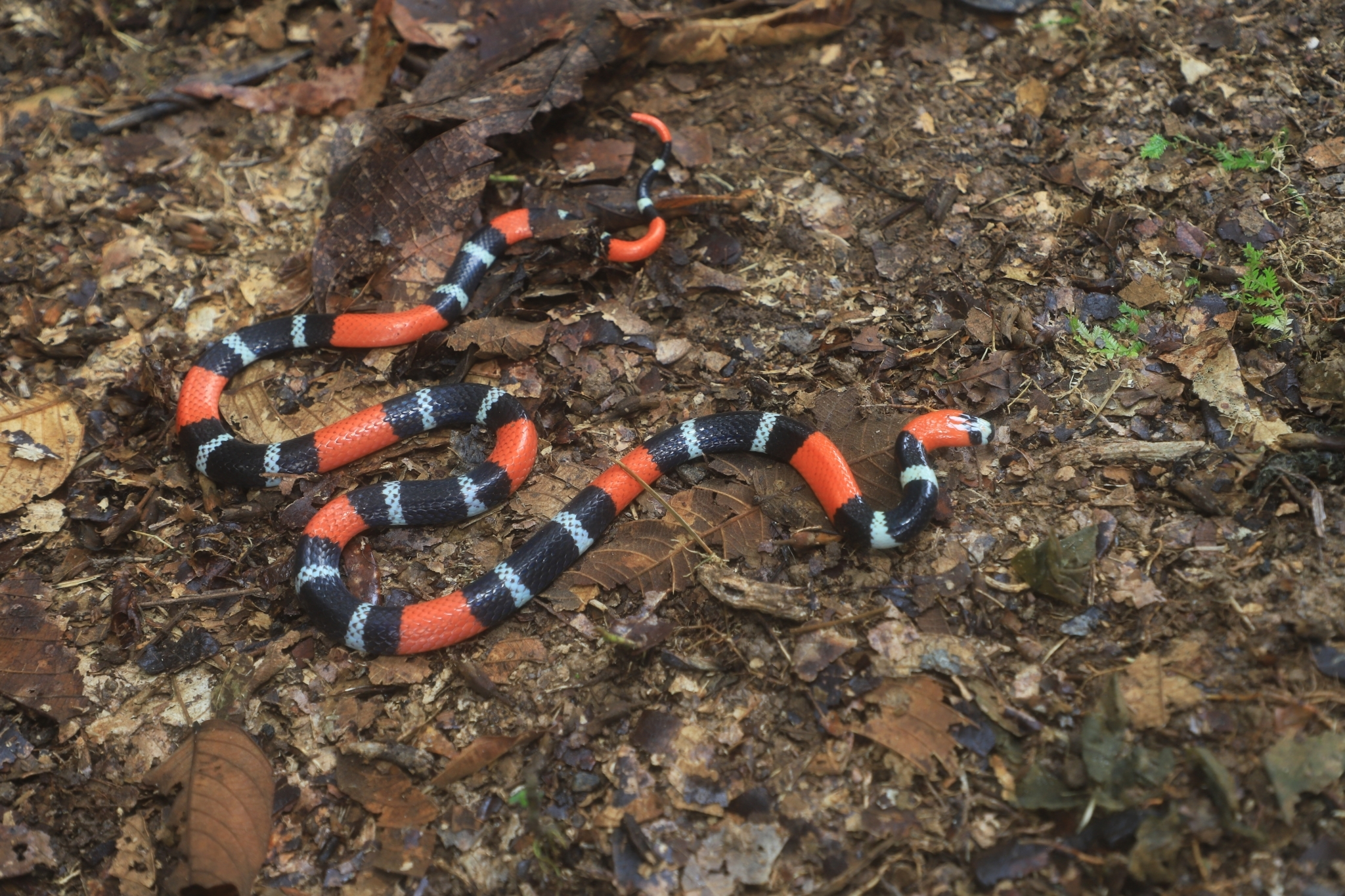

Scientific classification
- Kingdom: Animalia
- Phylum: Chordata
- Class: Reptilia
- Order: Squamata
- Suborder: Serpentes
- Family: Elapidae
- Genus: Micrurus
- Species: M. helleri

Binomial name
- Micrurus helleri K. Schmidt & F. Schmidt, 1925

Synonyms
- Micrurus helleri K. Schmidt & F. Schmidt; Micrurus lemniscatus helleri — Roze, 1967; Micrurus helleri — Hurtado-Gómez et al., 2021

= Micrurus helleri =

Species of snake

Micrurus helleri, also known commonly as Heller's coral snake and the western ribbon coral snake, is a species of venomous snake in the family Elapidae. The species is native to South America.

== Local common names ==
Local common names for Micrurus helleri include cobra coral de faixas occidental in Brazilian Portuguese and coral acintada occidental in South American Spanish.

== Etymology ==
The specific name, helleri, is in honor of American zoologist Edmund Heller, who collected the holotype.

== Geographic distribution ==
Micrurus helleri is found in Bolivia, Brazil, Colombia, Ecuador, Peru, and Venezuela.

== Habitat ==
The preferred natural habitat of Micrurus helleri is rainforest or humid forest, at elevations of 80–1,500 m (260–4,920 ft).

== Description ==
The color pattern of Micrurus helleri consists of rings (annuli) arranged as follows: wide black rings in triads (groups of three), the black rings separated by narrower white rings, and the triads separated by wide red rings. The rings of all colors are wider than those of other coral snakes, and the triads are fewer, 9–11 in males and only 8–11 in females.

The holotype has a total length of 64.8 cm (25.5 in), which includes a tail length of 5.2 cm (2.0 in).

== Diet ==
Micrurus helleri preys upon a wide variety of poikilotherms. Large adults prefer to eat the swamp eel (Synbranchus marmoratus). Smaller individuals eat caecilians such as Oscaecilia bassleri, litter-dwelling lizards such as Bachia trisanale, blind snakes such as Amerotyphlops brongersmianus, and suitably-sized colubrid snakes.

== Reproduction ==
Micrurus helleri is oviparous.
