= Lightbulb lizard =

Lightbulb lizards are found in the following genera:

- Andinosaura
- Oreosaurus
- Petracola
- Proctoporus
- Riama
- a species is also specifically called lightbulb lizard: Oreosaurus luctuosus
