= Bachia blairi =

Conservation status
- Near Threatened (IUCN 3.1)

Scientific classification
- Kingdom: Animalia
- Phylum: Chordata
- Class: Reptilia
- Order: Squamata
- Family: Gymnophthalmidae
- Genus: Bachia
- Species: B. blairi

Binomial name
- Bachia blairi (Dunn, 1940)

Synonyms
- Scolecosaurus blairi Dunn, 1940; Bachia blairi — McDiarmid & DeWeese, 1977

Species of lizard

Bachia blairi is a species of lizard in the family Gymnophthalmidae. The species is native to Central America.

== Etymology ==
The specific name, blairi, is in honor of American businessman Henry Sterling Blair, a manager of United Fruit Company in Panama, who was also an amateur herpetologist.

== Geographic range ==
B. blairi is found in Costa Rica and Panama.

== Habitat ==
The preferred natural habitat of B. blairi is forest, at altitudes of 2–40 m (6.6–131.2 ft).

== Description ==
B. blairi has reduced limbs. Each front leg has four digits, and each hind leg has three digits. Its body coloration is similar to B. pallidiceps. However, B. blairi does not have a bright, light-colored lateral stripe.

== Behavior ==
B. blairi is terrestrial and semifossorial, living in the leaf litter of undisturbed rainforest.

== Reproduction ==
The mode of reproduction of B. blairi is unknown.
