= Oscaecilia equatorialis =

Conservation status
- Data Deficient (IUCN 3.1)

Scientific classification
- Kingdom: Animalia
- Phylum: Chordata
- Class: Amphibia
- Order: Gymnophiona
- Clade: Apoda
- Family: Caeciliidae
- Genus: Oscaecilia
- Species: O. equatorialis

Binomial name
- Oscaecilia equatorialis Taylor, 1973

Species of amphibian

Oscaecilia equatorialis is a species of caecilian in the family Caeciliidae. It is endemic to Ecuador. Its natural habitats are subtropical or tropical moist lowland forests, plantations, rural gardens, and heavily degraded former forest.
