= Allobates mcdiarmidi =

Conservation status
- Critically endangered, possibly extinct (IUCN 3.1)

Scientific classification
- Kingdom: Animalia
- Phylum: Chordata
- Class: Amphibia
- Order: Anura
- Family: Aromobatidae
- Genus: Allobates
- Species: A. mcdiarmidi

Binomial name
- Allobates mcdiarmidi (Reynolds & Foster, 1992)

Synonyms
- Colostethus mcdiarmidi Reynolds & Foster, 1992

Species of frog

Allobates mcdiarmidi (common name: McDiarmid's rocket frog) is a species of frog in the family Aromobatidae. It is endemic to the eastern slopes of the Andes in the departments of La Paz and Cochabamba, Bolivia.

== Taxonomy ==
Allobates mcdiarmidi was first described in 1992 by Robert P. Reynolds and Mercedes S. Foster. Originally, it was known as Colostethus mcdiarmidi. Its specific name honored herpetologist Roy W. McDiarmid.

== Habitat and reproduction ==
This terrestrial frog is known from elevations of 1,290–1,693 m (4,232–5,554 ft) above sea level in the Yungas forest, which is in Bolivia's Cochabamba and La Paz Districts.

Scientists have observed the frog within some protected areas: Reserva de Biosfera y Tierra Comunitaria de Origen Pilón Lajas and Parque Nacional Carrasco.

The tadpoles develop in streams.

== Threats ==
The IUCN classifies this frog as critically endangered, citing recent, precipitous drops in population, which occurred even in places not subject to significant habitat degradation. IUCN surveys estimate the current population as no more than 250 mature adults. Scientists cite the fungus Batrachochytrium dendrobatidis and the related disease chytridiomycosis as one possible cause of this population decline. Deforestation, road building, and pollution also threaten this frog.
