= Anolis neblininus =

Conservation status
- Least Concern (IUCN 3.1)

Scientific classification
- Kingdom: Animalia
- Phylum: Chordata
- Class: Reptilia
- Order: Squamata
- Suborder: Iguania
- Family: Anolidae
- Genus: Anolis
- Species: A. neblininus

Binomial name
- Anolis neblininus (Myers, Williams, & McDiarmid, 1993)

Species of lizard

Anolis neblininus is a species of lizard in the family Dactyloidae. The species is found in Venezuela.
