= Bachia cacerensis =

Scientific classification
- Domain: Eukaryota
- Kingdom: Animalia
- Phylum: Chordata
- Class: Reptilia
- Order: Squamata
- Family: Gymnophthalmidae
- Genus: Bachia
- Species: B. cacerensis

Binomial name
- Bachia cacerensis (Castrillon & Strüssman, 1998)

Species of lizard

Bachia cacerensis is a species of lizard in the family Gymnophthalmidae. It is endemic to Brazil.
