= Oreosaurus bisbali =

Scientific classification
- Kingdom: Animalia
- Phylum: Chordata
- Class: Reptilia
- Order: Squamata
- Family: Gymnophthalmidae
- Genus: Oreosaurus
- Species: O. bisbali

Binomial name
- Oreosaurus bisbali Rivas, Sales-Nunes, Baran, Jowers, Smith, Hernandez-Morales, & Schargel, 2021

Species of lizard

Oreosaurus bisbali is a species of lizard in the family Gymnophthalmidae. It is endemic to Venezuela.
