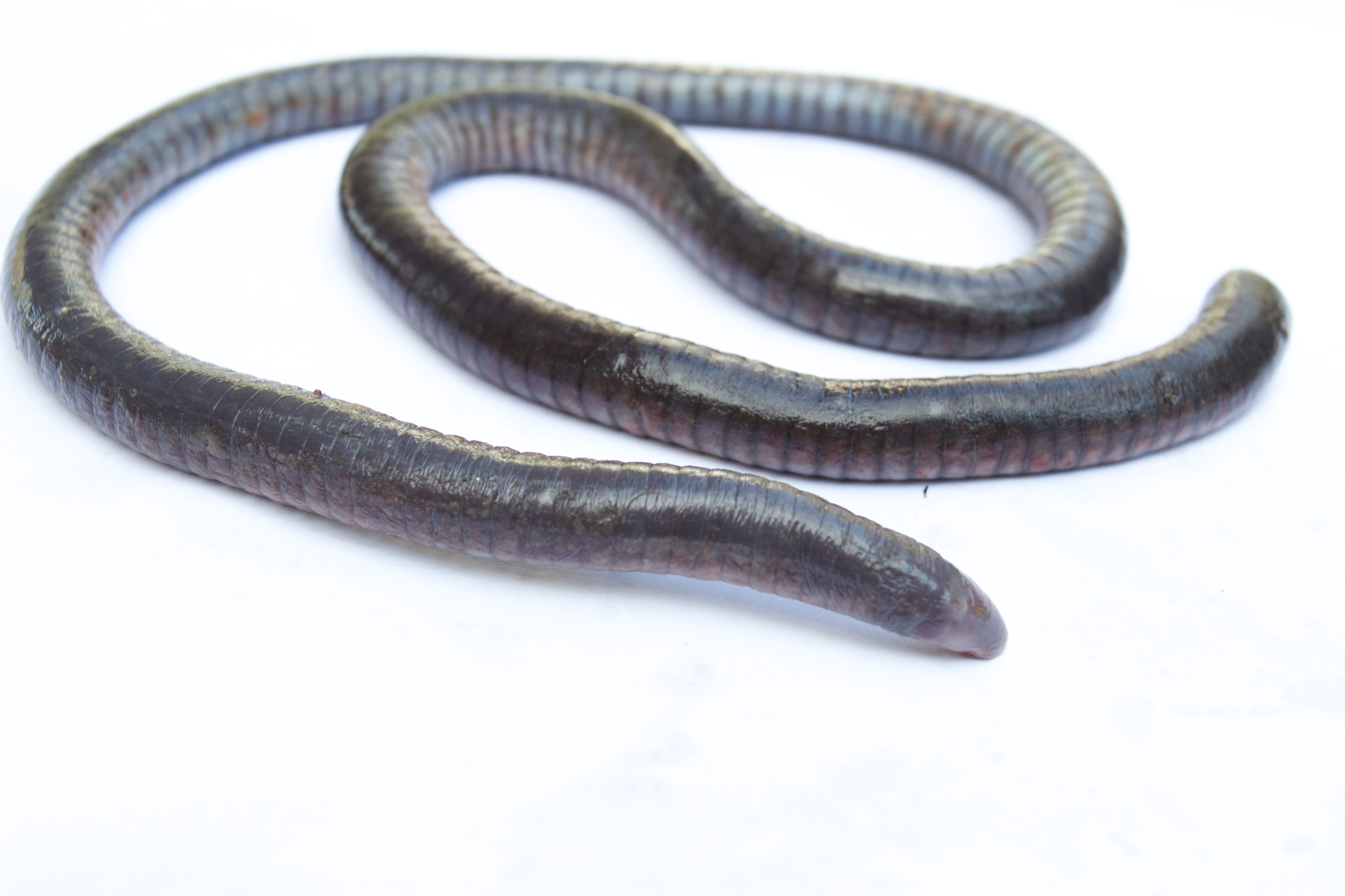

Conservation status
- Least Concern (IUCN 3.1)

Scientific classification
- Kingdom: Animalia
- Phylum: Chordata
- Class: Amphibia
- Order: Gymnophiona
- Clade: Apoda
- Family: Caeciliidae
- Genus: Oscaecilia
- Species: O. ochrocephala

Binomial name
- Oscaecilia ochrocephala (Cope, 1866)
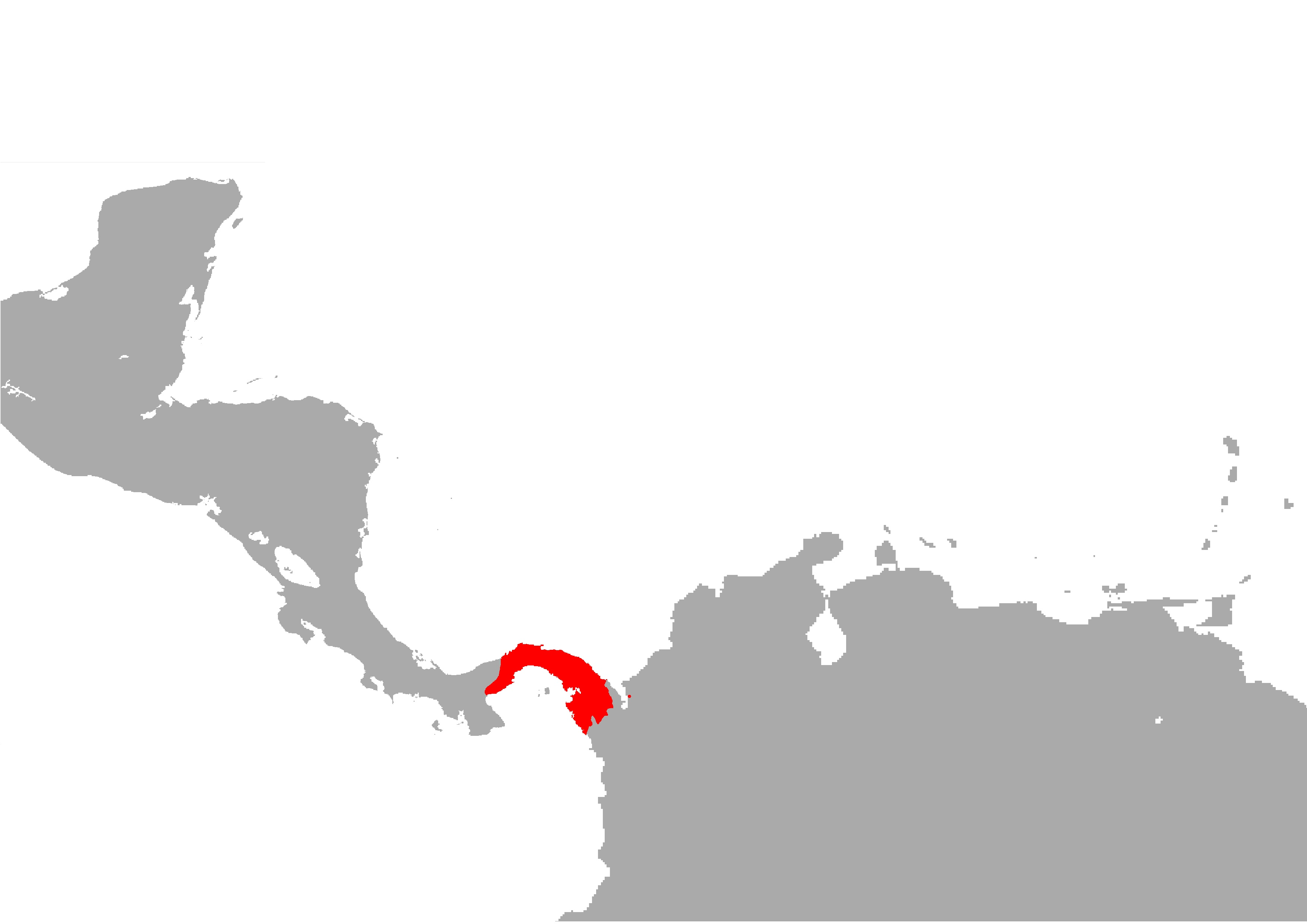

= Oscaecilia ochrocephala =

Species of amphibian

Oscaecilia ochrocephala is a species of caecilian in the family Caeciliidae.

== Distribution ==
Oscaecilia ochrocephala is most commonly found in Panama and Colombia. Its natural habitats are subtropical or tropical moist lowland forests, plantations, rural gardens, and heavily degraded former forests.
