= Atractus heyeri =

Scientific classification
- Kingdom: Animalia
- Phylum: Chordata
- Class: Reptilia
- Order: Squamata
- Suborder: Serpentes
- Family: Colubridae
- Genus: Atractus
- Species: A. heyeri

Binomial name
- Atractus heyeri Esqueda & McDiarmid, 2015

Species of snake

Atractus heyeri is a species of snake in the family Colubridae. It is endemic to Venezuela. It is named after Ronald Heyer, American herpetologist.
