= Bachia intermedia =

Conservation status
- Data Deficient (IUCN 3.1)

Scientific classification
- Kingdom: Animalia
- Phylum: Chordata
- Class: Reptilia
- Order: Squamata
- Family: Gymnophthalmidae
- Genus: Bachia
- Species: B. intermedia

Binomial name
- Bachia intermedia Noble, 1921

Species of lizard

Bachia intermedia, commonly known as Noble's bachia, is a species of lizard in the family Gymnophthalmidae. It is endemic to Peru.
