= Bachia talpa =

Conservation status
- Least Concern (IUCN 3.1)

Scientific classification
- Kingdom: Animalia
- Phylum: Chordata
- Class: Reptilia
- Order: Squamata
- Family: Gymnophthalmidae
- Genus: Bachia
- Species: B. talpa

Binomial name
- Bachia talpa Ruthven, 1925

Species of lizard

Bachia talpa, Ruthven's bachia, is a species of lizard in the family Gymnophthalmidae. It is endemic to Colombia.
