= Bachia geralista =

Scientific classification
- Kingdom: Animalia
- Phylum: Chordata
- Class: Reptilia
- Order: Squamata
- Family: Gymnophthalmidae
- Genus: Bachia
- Species: B. geralista

Binomial name
- Bachia geralista Teixeira, Recoder, Camacho, de Sena, Navas & Rodrigues, 2013

Species of lizard

Bachia geralista is a species of lizard in the family Gymnophthalmidae. It is endemic to Brazil.
