= Bachia remota =

Scientific classification
- Domain: Eukaryota
- Kingdom: Animalia
- Phylum: Chordata
- Class: Reptilia
- Order: Squamata
- Family: Gymnophthalmidae
- Genus: Bachia
- Species: B. remota

Binomial name
- Bachia remota Ribeiro Jr., Basto da Silva, & Lima, 2016

Species of lizard

Bachia remota is a species of lizard in the family Gymnophthalmidae. It is endemic to Brazil.

== Description ==
The snout of Bachia remota is rounded whilst the body is long and small in width. The tail is longer than the body and there are four limbs, with each limb having four digits. It also has scales along its entire body.
