= Oscaecilia osae =

Conservation status
- Least Concern (IUCN 3.1)

Scientific classification
- Kingdom: Animalia
- Phylum: Chordata
- Class: Amphibia
- Order: Gymnophiona
- Clade: Apoda
- Family: Caeciliidae
- Genus: Oscaecilia
- Species: O. osae

Binomial name
- Oscaecilia osae Lahanas and Savage, 1992
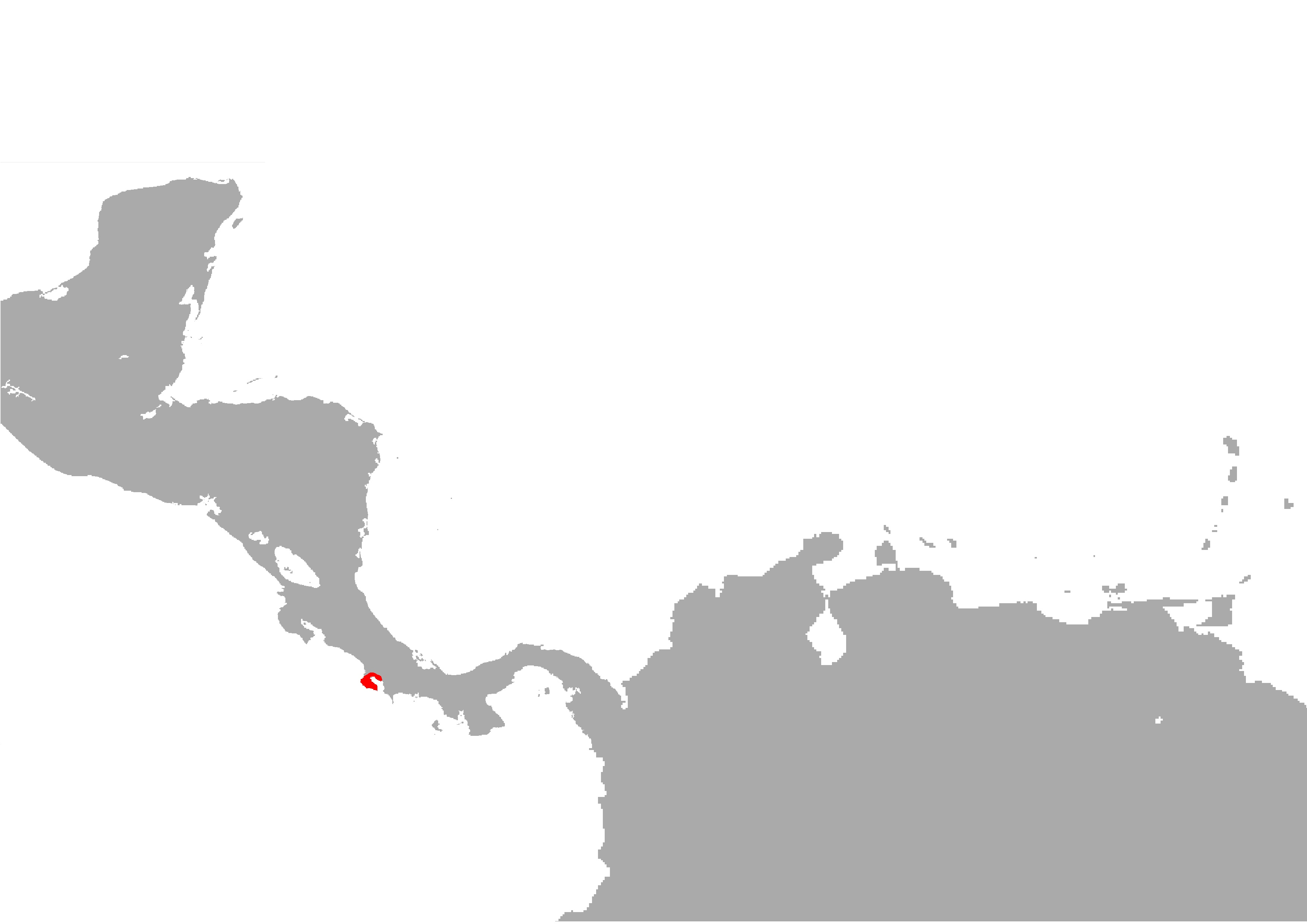

Species of amphibian

Oscaecilia osae is a species of caecilian in the family Caeciliidae. It is endemic to Costa Rica and is only known from the Golfo Dulce area, on the Pacific Ocean side of Costa Rica. The specific name osae refers to its type locality, the airstrip at La Sirena, being located on the Osa Peninsula. It is also known as the airstrip caecilia or airstrip caecilian.

== Description ==
The holotype, an adult female, (Note: The specimen is first defined as "an adult female", but later in the species description referred to as "a subadult of undeterminable sex". Table 1 defines it as an adult, without specifying sex.) measures 382 mm (15.0 in) in total length. The body is highly attenuated; the body width is 4–5 mm (0.16–0.20 in). The eyes are not visible. The primary annulus count is high (232), whereas the secondary annuli are completely absent. Scales are small and present from the primary annulus 175. Coloration is uniform lavender, becoming lighter anteriorly and ventrally. The coloration is caused by tiny, closely spaced pinkish-cream punctate glands on darker background; when these become closer together and eventually fuse, they give rise to the more pinkish appearance of the head and ventral region.

== Habitat and conservation ==
Oscaecilia osae is a subterranean species that occurs in lowland rainforest at elevations below 240 m (790 ft). There appear not to be major threats to this species, although its distribution and ecology are poorly known. It is well protected by the Corcovado National Park.
