= Oscaecilia zweifeli =

Conservation status
- Data Deficient (IUCN 3.1)

Scientific classification
- Kingdom: Animalia
- Phylum: Chordata
- Class: Amphibia
- Order: Gymnophiona
- Clade: Apoda
- Family: Caeciliidae
- Genus: Oscaecilia
- Species: O. zweifeli

Binomial name
- Oscaecilia zweifeli Taylor, 1968

Species of amphibian

Oscaecilia zweifeli is a species of caecilian in the family Caeciliidae. It is a poorly known species only known from few specimens: the holotype from the imprecise type locality, "a small creek tributary to Río Mazaruni" in Guyana, one from similarly imprecise Cayenne in French Guiana, and another one from the Nouragues research station in French Guiana. The specific name zweifeli honors Richard G. Zweifel, an American herpetologist. Common names Zweifel's caecilian and tributary caecilian have been coined for it.

== Description ==
Oscaecilia zweifeli is one of the more robust-bodied members of its genus. The body has 202–216 primary annuli. The dorsum is grayish lavender in color, while the belly is whitish and has some gray specks. There is a yellowish spot near the nostril and a yellowish band on the side of the head, terminating at the aperture for the tentacle.

== Habitat, ecology, and conservation ==
The habitat requirements and ecology of this are poorly known, but it is assumed to be a subterranean species inhabiting lowland tropical forest. Predators of Oscaecilia zweifeli include the giant tarantula Theraphosa blondi: an adult tarantula was found with its caecilian prey under a rotten trunk, and it had produced a silk cocoon around the head of the dead animal, which was already partly digested. Threats to this species are unknown.
