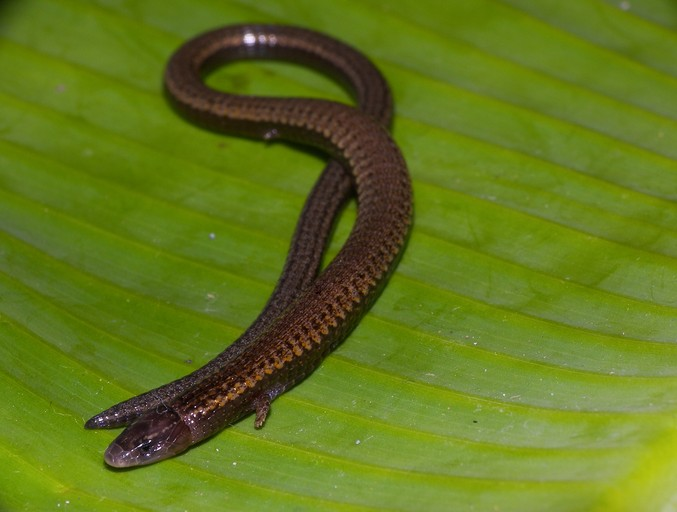
- Bachia bicolor

Scientific classification
- Kingdom: Animalia
- Phylum: Chordata
- Class: Reptilia
- Order: Squamata
- Family: Gymnophthalmidae
- Tribe: Bachini
- Genus: Bachia; Gray, 1845

= Bachia =

Genus of lizards

"Bachia" as described by Förster in 1869 is now the cryptine wasp genus Bachiana.

Bachia is a genus of lizards in the family Gymnophthalmidae.

== Species ==
The genus Bachia contains 31 species.

- Bachia alleni (Barbour, 1914)
- Bachia barbouri C.E. Burt & M.D. Burt, 1931 – Barbour's bachia
- Bachia beebei Murphy, Salvi, Santos, Braswell, Charles, Borzeé & Jowers, 2019
- Bachia bicolor (Cope, 1896) – two-colored bachia
- Bachia blairi (Dunn, 1940)
- Bachia bresslaui (Amaral, 1935) – Bresslau's bachia
- Bachia cacerensis (Castrillon & Strüssman, 1998)
- Bachia didactyla (de Freitas, Strüssmann, M. de Carvalho, Kawashita-Ribeiro & Mott, 2011)
- Bachia dorbignyi (A.M.C. Duméril & Bibron, 1839) – Dorbigny's bachia
- Bachia flavescens (Bonnaterre, 1789)
- Bachia geralista Teixeira, Recoder, Camacho, de Sena, Navas & Rodrigues, 2013
- Bachia guianensis Hoogmoed & Dixon, 1977 – Guyana bachia
- Bachia heteropa (Wiegmann, 1856) – LaGuaira bachia
- Bachia huallagana Dixon, 1973 – Dixon's bachia
- Bachia intermedia Noble, 1921 – Noble's bachia
- Bachia lineata (Boulenger, 1903)
- Bachia marcelae (Donoso-Barros, 1968)
- Bachia micromela Rodrigues, Pavan & Curcio, 2007
- Bachia oxyrhina Rodrigues, Camacho, Nunes, Recoder, Teixeira, Valdujo, Ghellere, Mott & Nogueira, 2008
- Bachia pallidiceps (Cope, 1862) – Cope's bachia
- Bachia panoplia Thomas, 1965
- Bachia peruana (F. Werner, 1901) – Peru bachia
- Bachia psamophila Rodrigues, Pavan & Curcio, 2007
- Bachia pyburni Kizirian & McDiarmid, 1998
- Bachia remota Ribeiro-Júnior, da Silva & Lima, 2016
- Bachia scaea Teixeira, Dal Vechio, Nunes, Mollo Neto, Lobo, Storti, Gaiga, Dias & Rodrigues, 2013
- Bachia scolecoides (Vanzolini, 1961) – Vanzolini's bachia
- Bachia talpa (Ruthven, 1925) – Ruthven's bachia
- Bachia trinitatis (Barbour, 1914) – Trinidad bachia, Trinidad worm lizard
- Bachia trisanale (Cope, 1868) – Stacy's bachia
- Bachia whitei Murphy, Salvi, Santos, Braswell, Charles, Borzeé & Jowers, 2019 – White's bachia

Nota bene: A binomial authority in parentheses indicates that the species was originally described in a genus other than Bachia.
