= Bachia panoplia =

Conservation status
- Least Concern (IUCN 3.1)

Scientific classification
- Kingdom: Animalia
- Phylum: Chordata
- Class: Reptilia
- Order: Squamata
- Family: Gymnophthalmidae
- Genus: Bachia
- Species: B. panoplia

Binomial name
- Bachia panoplia Thomas, 1965

Species of lizard

Bachia panoplia is a species of lizard in the family Gymnophthalmidae. It is endemic to Brazil.

== Description ==
Bachia panoplia is a small, terrestrial, snake-like lizard with an elongated body and reduced limbs, typical of the genus Bachia. Like other fossorial gymnophthalmid lizards of the genus, it lacks external ear openings, has an elongate body and tail, and presents a distinctive eyelid structure with substantial variation in levels of limb reduction. The species is oviparous, laying eggs with little embryonic development within the mother. Bachia panoplia belongs to the bresslaui group within the genus, and exhibits intermediate limb morphology relative to other Bachia species and closely related genera.

== Habitat and distribution ==
Bachia panoplia is known from specimens collected in Manaus, Amazonas, Brazil, indicating its presence in the Amazon rainforest region. Members of the genus Bachia typically occupy neotropical forest floor habitats, spending most of their time moving through leaf litter and soil.

== Ecology and behavior ==
Like other Bachia species, B. panoplia likely hunts for soft-bodied insects, particularly termites and ant larvae in underground nests. These lizards occasionally venture into decomposing wood where they may capture beetle larvae. Their snake-like appearance and fossorial adaptations allow them to move efficiently through the substrate in search of prey. Bachia species are considered shallow burrowers, showing morphological and behavioral traits indicating fossorial habits, including burrowing when disturbed.

== Taxonomy ==
The genus Bachia has been traditionally divided into species groups based on morphological features, with B. panoplia belonging to the bresslaui group. However, recent molecular phylogenetic studies have challenged these traditional morphological groupings, suggesting they may not represent natural, monophyletic arrangements.

== Conservation status ==
The species is listed as Least Concern by the IUCN, though like many small, fossorial reptiles, detailed information about population status and trends is limited.
