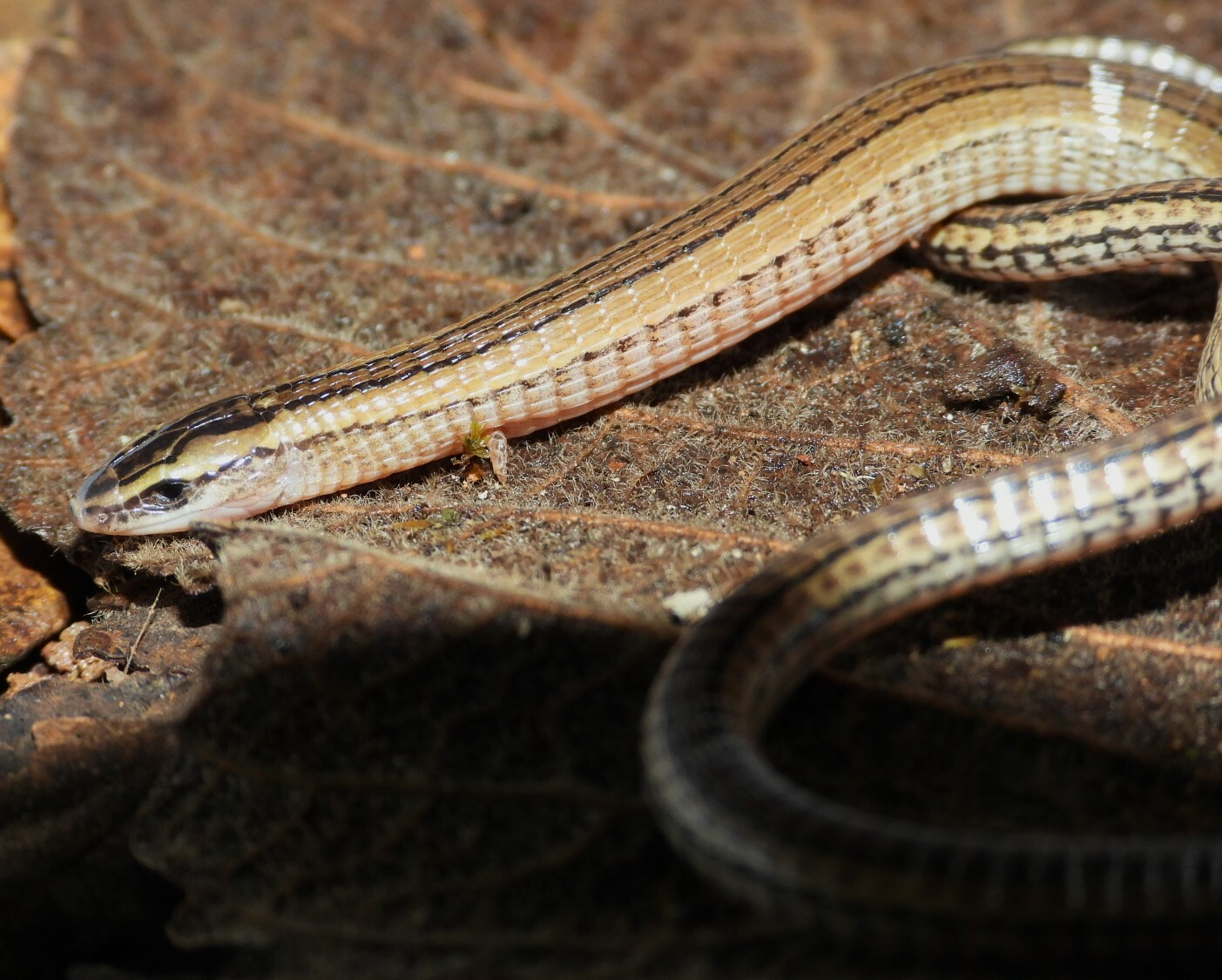

Conservation status
- Vulnerable (IUCN 3.1)

Scientific classification
- Kingdom: Animalia
- Phylum: Chordata
- Class: Reptilia
- Order: Squamata
- Family: Gymnophthalmidae
- Genus: Bachia
- Species: B. bresslaui

Binomial name
- Bachia bresslaui (Amaral, 1935)

Synonyms
- Apatelus bresslaui Amaral, 1935; Bachia bresslaui — Vanzolini, 1961

= Bachia bresslaui =

Species of lizard

Bachia bresslaui, also known commonly as Bresslau's bachia, is a species of lizard in the family Gymnophthalmidae. The species is native to southern South America.

== Etymology ==
The specific name, bresslaui, is in honor of German zoologist Ernst Ludwig Bresslau.

== Description ==
B. bresslau has its front and back legs much reduced, each to one scale that resembles a toe. Adults may attain a snout-to-vent length (SVL) of 7.5 cm (3.0 in).

== Distribution and habitat ==
B. bresslaui is found in southeastern Brazil, in the states of Bahia, Distrito Federal, Mato Grosso, Mato Grosso do Sul, and São Paulo. It is also found in Paraguay in Amambay Department.

The preferred natural habitats of B. bresslaui are savanna and shrubland.

== Behavior ==
B. bresslaui is terrestrial and fossorial.

B. bresslaui is oviparous.
