= Oreosaurus shrevei =

Conservation status
- Least Concern (IUCN 3.1)

Scientific classification
- Kingdom: Animalia
- Phylum: Chordata
- Class: Reptilia
- Order: Squamata
- Family: Gymnophthalmidae
- Genus: Oreosaurus
- Species: O. shrevei

Binomial name
- Oreosaurus shrevei (Parker, 1935)

Synonyms
- Proctoporus (Oreosaurus) shrevei Parker, 1935; Proctoporus shrevei — J. Peters & Donoso-Barros, 1970; Riama shrevei — Doan & Castoe, 2005; Oreosaurus shrevei — Sánchez-Pacheco et al., 2017

Species of lizard

Oreosaurus shrevei, known commonly as the luminous lizard or Shreve's lightbulb lizard, is a species of lizard in the family Gymnophthalmidae. The species is endemic to the Northern Range of mountains of the island of Trinidad in the Republic of Trinidad and Tobago. This species was for some time erroneously alleged to be bioluminescent (hence its common name - luminous lizard).

== Etymology ==
The specific name, shrevei, is in honor of American herpetologist Benjamin Shreve.

== Habitat ==
The preferred natural habitat of O. shrevei is tropical montane forest, at altitudes of 600–981 m (1,969–3,219 ft), where it utilizes rock crevices and leaf litter on the forest floor, on stream banks and at the mouths of caves.

== Reproduction ==
O. shrevei is oviparous.
