= Oreosaurus rhodogaster =

Conservation status
- Critically Endangered (IUCN 3.1)

Scientific classification
- Kingdom: Animalia
- Phylum: Chordata
- Class: Reptilia
- Order: Squamata
- Family: Gymnophthalmidae
- Genus: Oreosaurus
- Species: O. rhodogaster

Binomial name
- Oreosaurus rhodogaster Rivas, Schargel, & Meik, 2005

Synonyms
- Riama rhodogaster

Species of lizard

Oreosaurus rhodogaster is a species of lizard in the family Gymnophthalmidae. It is endemic to Venezuela.
