= Bachia scaea =

Scientific classification
- Kingdom: Animalia
- Phylum: Chordata
- Class: Reptilia
- Order: Squamata
- Family: Gymnophthalmidae
- Genus: Bachia
- Species: B. scaea

Binomial name
- Bachia scaea Teixeira Jr., Dal Vechio, Sales Nunes, Mollo Neto, Lobo, Storti, Gaiga, Dias, & Rodrigues, 2013

Species of lizard

Bachia scaea is a species of lizard in the family Gymnophthalmidae. It is endemic to Brazil.
