= Oscaecilia hypereumeces =

Conservation status
- Data Deficient (IUCN 3.1)

Scientific classification
- Kingdom: Animalia
- Phylum: Chordata
- Class: Amphibia
- Order: Gymnophiona
- Clade: Apoda
- Family: Caeciliidae
- Genus: Oscaecilia
- Species: O. hypereumeces

Binomial name
- Oscaecilia hypereumeces Taylor, 1968
- Joinville in Santa Catarina, the only locality from where Oscaecilia hypereumeces is known with some certainty

Species of amphibian

Oscaecilia hypereumeces is a species of caecilian in the family Caeciliidae. It appears to be endemic to Brazil and is only known from two specimens. The holotype was collected from Joinville in Santa Catarina, although there are some doubts whether this really is its correct origin. Another specimen originates from an unknown locality. Common name Joinville caecilian has been proposed for this species.

== Description ==
The holotype measures 640 mm (25.2 in) in total length, whereas the other specimen is partly broken and measures 400 mm (15.7 in). The body is 5–7 mm (0.2–0.3 in) wide. The body has 208–226 primary folds that are incomplete both above and below, except in the posterior part of the body. The eyes are present under bone. The tentacles are almost immediately below the nostrils. The head is whitish to light brown. The body is brown and vaguely variegated, except for the foremost one fourth that is violet brown. The venter is dull cream.

== Habitat and conservation ==
Oscaecilia hypereumeces presumably lives subterraneanly, given the ecological preferences of its congeners, in lowland rainforest. The type locality is at about 300 m (980 ft) above sea level. Specific threats to this little known species are not known, although the type locality has been converted into an industrial zone. It is not known to occur in any protected areas.
