= Bachia huallagana =

Scientific classification
- Kingdom: Animalia
- Phylum: Chordata
- Class: Reptilia
- Order: Squamata
- Family: Gymnophthalmidae
- Genus: Bachia
- Species: B. huallagana

Binomial name
- Bachia huallagana Dixon, 1973

Species of lizard

Bachia huallagana, Dixon's bachia, is a species of lizard in the family Gymnophthalmidae. It is endemic to Peru.
