= Oreosaurus achlyens =

Conservation status
- Least Concern (IUCN 3.1)

Scientific classification
- Kingdom: Animalia
- Phylum: Chordata
- Class: Reptilia
- Order: Squamata
- Family: Gymnophthalmidae
- Genus: Oreosaurus
- Species: O. achlyens

Binomial name
- Oreosaurus achlyens (Uzzell, 1958)

Synonyms
- Proctoporus achlyens; Riama achlyens

Species of lizard

Oreosaurus achlyens is a species of lizard in the family Gymnophthalmidae. It is endemic to Venezuela.
