= Oscaecilia polyzona =

Conservation status
- Least Concern (IUCN 3.1)

Scientific classification
- Kingdom: Animalia
- Phylum: Chordata
- Class: Amphibia
- Order: Gymnophiona
- Clade: Apoda
- Family: Caeciliidae
- Genus: Oscaecilia
- Species: O. polyzona

Binomial name
- Oscaecilia polyzona (Fischer, 1880)
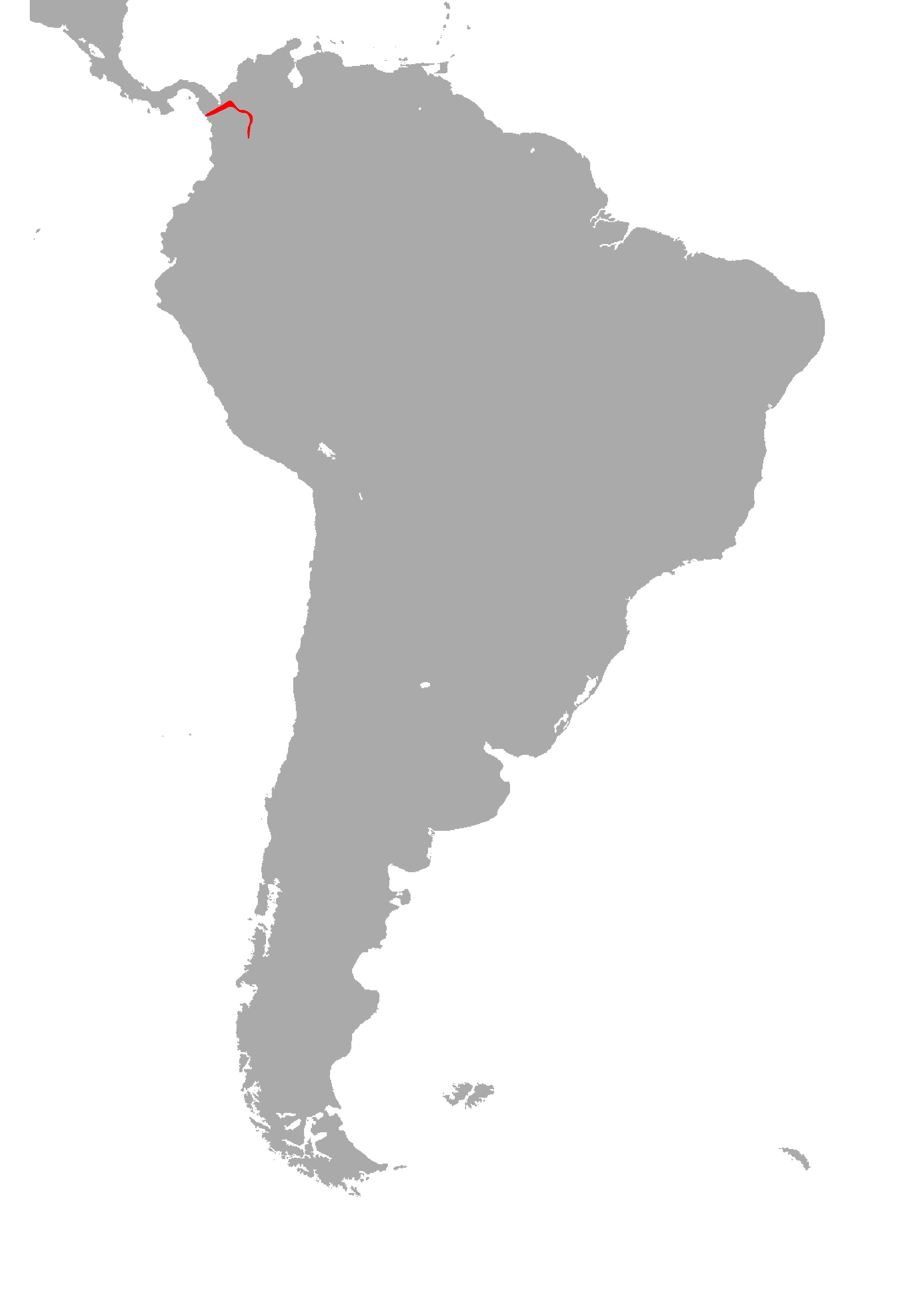

Species of amphibian

Oscaecilia polyzona is a species of amphibian in the family Caeciliidae. It is found in Colombia and possibly Panama. Its natural habitats are subtropical or tropical moist lowland forests, plantations, rural gardens and heavily degraded former forest.
