= Bachia beebei =

Scientific classification
- Kingdom: Animalia
- Phylum: Chordata
- Class: Reptilia
- Order: Squamata
- Family: Gymnophthalmidae
- Genus: Bachia
- Species: B. beebei

Binomial name
- Bachia beebei Murphy, Salvi, Santos, Braswell, Charles, Borzee, & Jowers, 2019

Species of lizard

Bachia beebei is a species of lizard in the family Gymnophthalmidae. It is endemic to Venezuela.
