= Bachia pyburni =

Conservation status
- Least Concern (IUCN 3.1)

Scientific classification
- Kingdom: Animalia
- Phylum: Chordata
- Class: Reptilia
- Order: Squamata
- Family: Gymnophthalmidae
- Genus: Bachia
- Species: B. pyburni

Binomial name
- Bachia pyburni Kizirian & McDiarmid, 1998

Species of lizard

Bachia pyburni is a species of lizard in the family Gymnophthalmidae. The species is native to northern South America.

== Etymology ==
The specific name, pyburni, is in honor of American herpetologist William Frank "Billy" Pyburn (1927–2007). Accordingly, it is also known commonly as Pyburn's bachia.

== Geographic range ==
B. pyburni is found in northern Brazil, southeastern Colombia, and southern Venezuela.

== Habitat ==
The preferred habitat of B. pyburni is forest at altitudes of about 150 m (490 ft).

== Reproduction ==
B. pyburni is oviparous.
