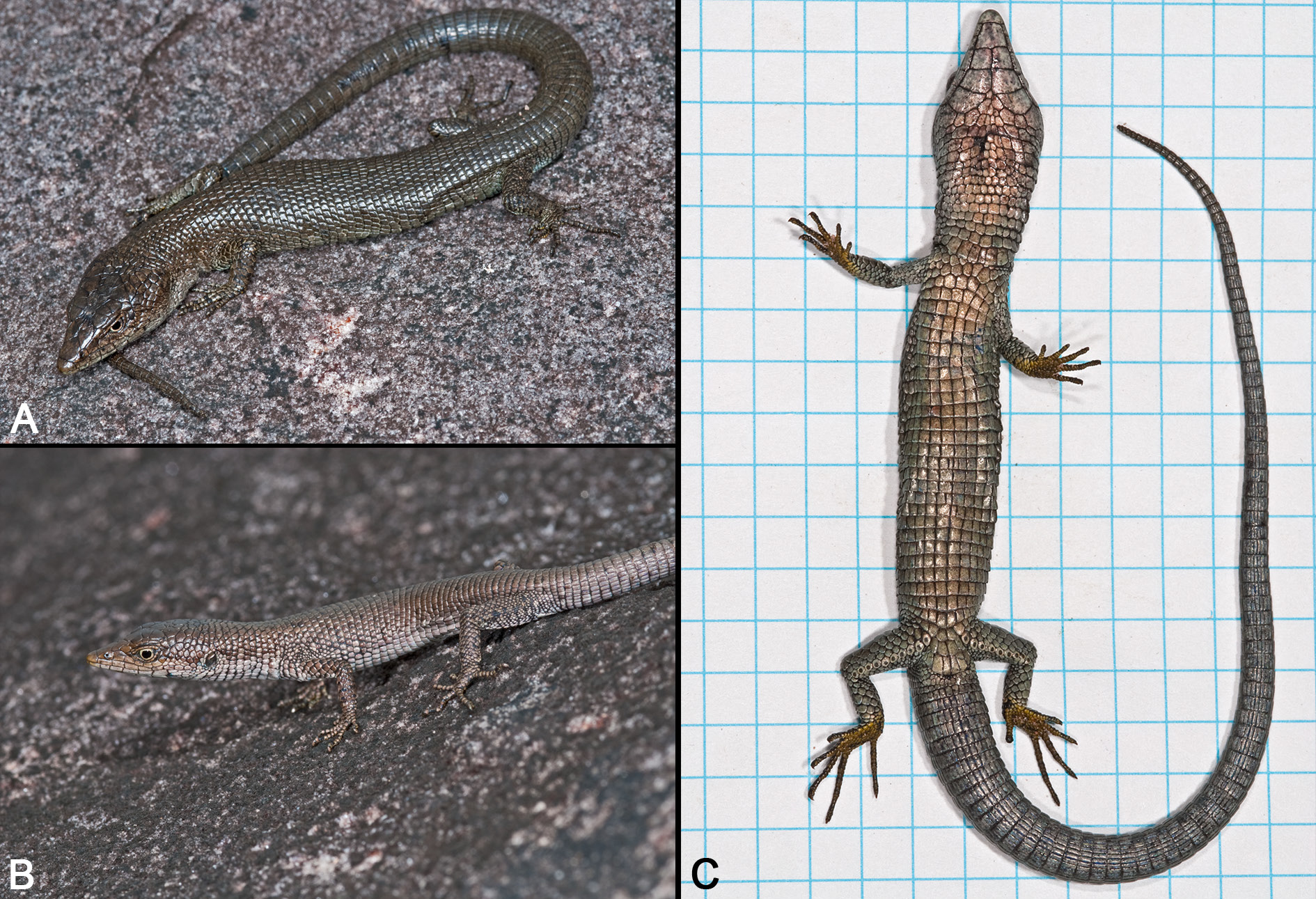
- A juvenile male Oreosaurus mcdiarmidi (anadia mcdiarmidi)

Conservation status
- Least Concern (IUCN 3.1)

Scientific classification
- Kingdom: Animalia
- Phylum: Chordata
- Class: Reptilia
- Order: Squamata
- Family: Gymnophthalmidae
- Genus: Oreosaurus
- Species: O. mcdiarmidi

Binomial name
- Oreosaurus mcdiarmidi (Kok & Rivas, 2011)

Synonyms
- Anadia mcdiarmidi Kok & Rivas, 2011

= Oreosaurus mcdiarmidi =

Species of lizard

Oreosaurus mcdiarmidi is a species of lizard in the family Gymnophthalmidae. It is endemic to Chimantá Massif in Venezuela. It is named for Roy W. McDiarmid, American herpetologist, "for his contribution to the knowledge of the Pantepui herpetofauna".
