= Bachia scolecoides =

Conservation status
- Least Concern (IUCN 3.1)

Scientific classification
- Kingdom: Animalia
- Phylum: Chordata
- Class: Reptilia
- Order: Squamata
- Suborder: Lacertoidea
- Family: Gymnophthalmidae
- Genus: Bachia
- Species: B. scolecoides

Binomial name
- Bachia scolecoides Vanzolini, 1961

Species of lizard

Bachia scolecoides, Vanzolini's bachia, is a species of lizard in the family Gymnophthalmidae. It is endemic to Brazil.
