= Bachia barbouri =

Conservation status
- Data Deficient (IUCN 3.1)

Scientific classification
- Kingdom: Animalia
- Phylum: Chordata
- Class: Reptilia
- Order: Squamata
- Family: Gymnophthalmidae
- Genus: Bachia
- Species: B. barbouri

Binomial name
- Bachia barbouri C.E. Burt & M.D. Burt, 1931

Species of lizard

Bachia barbouri, also known commonly as Barbour's bachia, is a species of lizard in the family Gymnophthalmidae. The species is endemic to Peru.

== Etymology ==
The specific name, barbouri, is in honor of American herpetologist Thomas Barbour.

== Geographic range ==
B. barbouri is found in northwestern Peru, in the valleys of the Río Chinchipe, the Río Marañón, and the Río Utcubamba.

== Habitat ==
The preferred natural habitat of B. barbouri is forest.

== Description ==
The holotype of B. barbouri has a snout-to-vent length (SVL) of 5.6 cm (2.2 in). The legs are much reduced. The front leg is short, with only two digits. The back leg is either a small tubercle or is absent.

== Reproduction ==
B. barbouri is oviparous. Each egg measures about 5 mm × 15 mm (0.20 in × 0.59 in).
