= Bachia peruana =

Conservation status
- Least Concern (IUCN 3.1)

Scientific classification
- Domain: Eukaryota
- Kingdom: Animalia
- Phylum: Chordata
- Class: Reptilia
- Order: Squamata
- Family: Gymnophthalmidae
- Genus: Bachia
- Species: B. peruana

Binomial name
- Bachia peruana (Werner, 1901)

Species of lizard

Bachia peruana, the Peru bachia, is a species of lizard in the family Gymnophthalmidae. It is found in Peru and Brazil.
