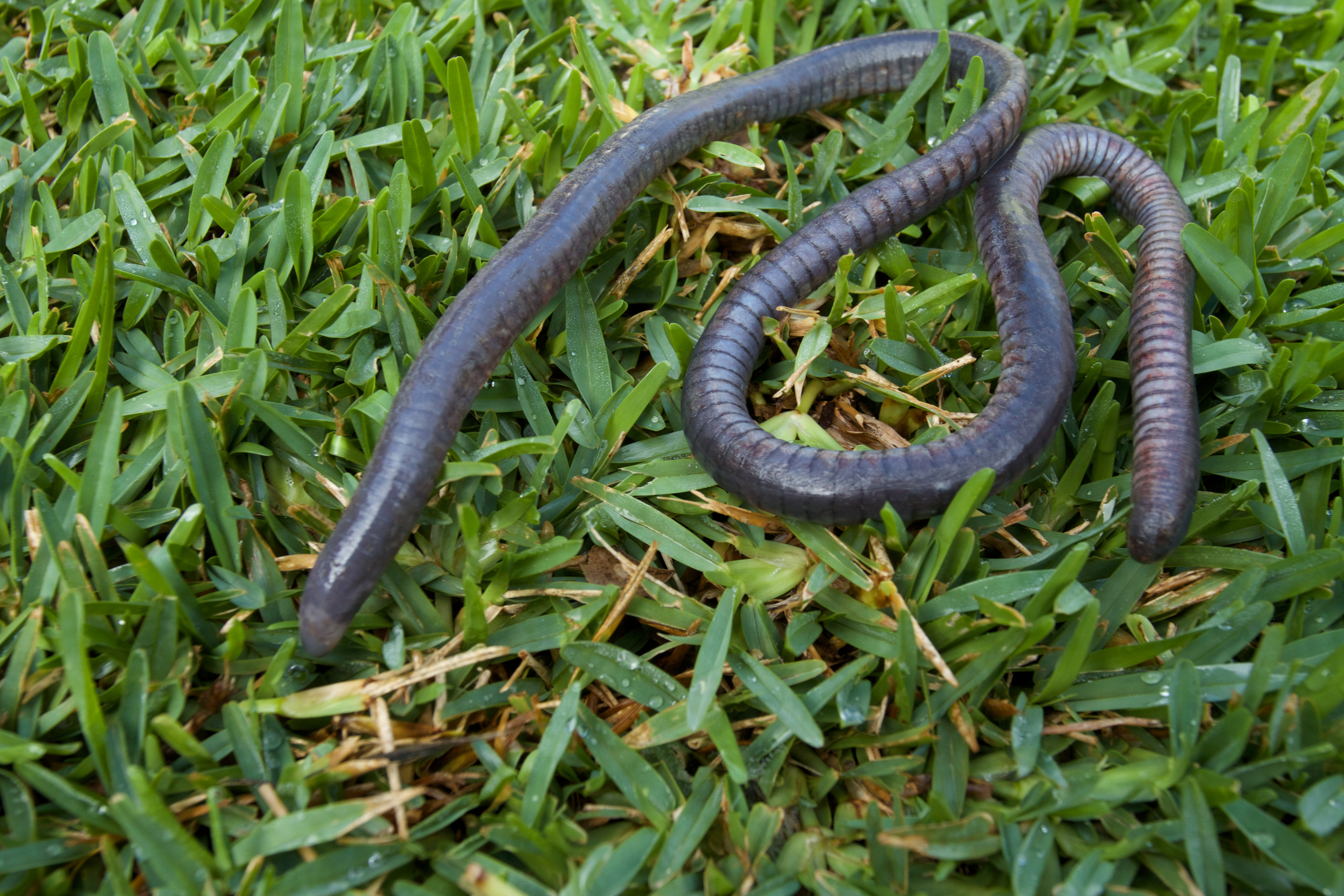
- Oscaecilia ochrocephala

Scientific classification
- Domain: Eukaryota
- Kingdom: Animalia
- Phylum: Chordata
- Class: Amphibia
- Order: Gymnophiona
- Clade: Apoda
- Family: Caeciliidae
- Genus: Oscaecilia; Taylor, 1968

Type species
- Caecilia ochrocephala Cope, 1866

Species
- 9 species (see text)

= Oscaecilia =

Genus of amphibians

Oscaecilia is a genus of caecilians in the family Caeciliidae. The genus is distributed in southeastern Central America (Costa Rica, Panama) and northern South America, possibly extending into southern Brazil. They are sometimes known as the South American caecilians.

== Description ==
Adult Oscaecilia often exceed 60 cm (24 in) in total length. The diagnostic characters of Oscaecilia include eyes that are covered by bone, presence of splenial teeth, absence of true tail, and a tentacular opening that is directly below the nostril, much closer to it than to the eye.

== Species ==
There are nine recognized species:

Binomial name and author	Common name
Oscaecilia bassleri (Dunn, 1942)	Pastaza River caecilian
Oscaecilia elongata (Dunn, 1942)	Yavisa caecilian
Oscaecilia equatorialis Taylor, 1973	Equatorial caecilian
Oscaecilia hypereumeces Taylor, 1968	Joinville caecilian
Oscaecilia koepckeorum Wake, 1984	Quisto Cocha caecilian
Oscaecilia ochrocephala Cope, 1866	Yellow-headed caecilian
Oscaecilia osae Lahanas & Savage, 1992	Osa caecilian, airstrip caecilian
Oscaecilia polyzona (Fischer in Peters, 1880)	New Granada caecilian
Oscaecilia zweifeli Taylor, 1968	Tributary caecilian
