= Bachia oxyrhina =

Conservation status
- Least Concern (IUCN 3.1)

Scientific classification
- Kingdom: Animalia
- Phylum: Chordata
- Class: Reptilia
- Order: Squamata
- Family: Gymnophthalmidae
- Genus: Bachia
- Species: B. oxyrhina

Binomial name
- Bachia oxyrhina Rodrigues, Camacho, Sales Nunes, Sousa Recoder, Teixeira Jr., Valdujo, Ghellere, Mott, & Nogueira, 2008

Species of lizard

Bachia oxyrhina is a species of lizard in the family Gymnophthalmidae. It is endemic to Brazil.
