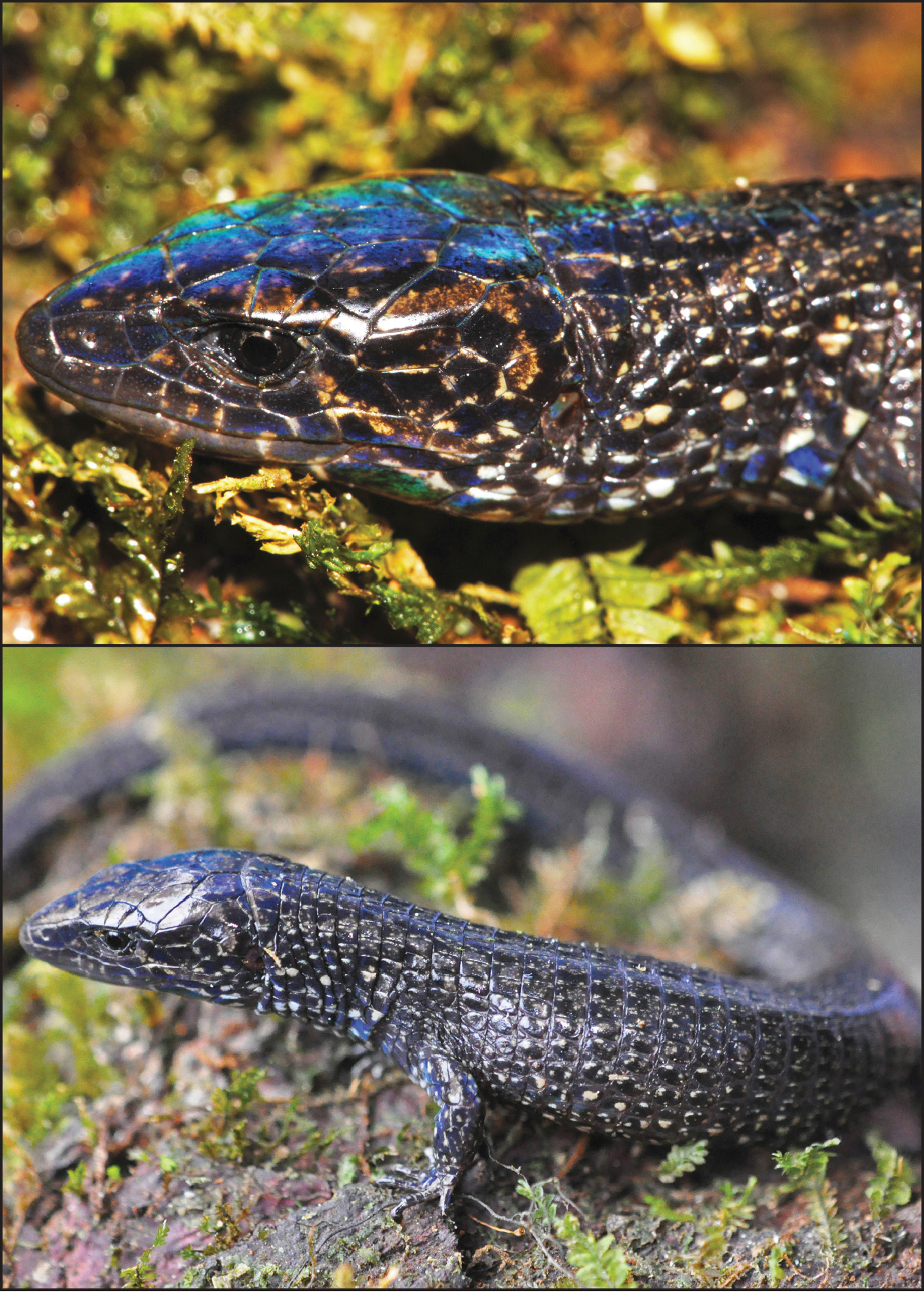

Scientific classification
- Kingdom: Animalia
- Phylum: Chordata
- Class: Reptilia
- Order: Squamata
- Family: Gymnophthalmidae
- Genus: Oreosaurus
- Species: O. serranus

Binomial name
- Oreosaurus serranus Sánchez-Pacheco, Sales-Nunes, Rodrigues, & Murphy, 2017

= Oreosaurus serranus =

Species of lizard

Oreosaurus serranus is a species of lizard in the family Gymnophthalmidae. It is endemic to Colombia.
