= Bachia psamophila =

Scientific classification
- Kingdom: Animalia
- Phylum: Chordata
- Class: Reptilia
- Order: Squamata
- Family: Gymnophthalmidae
- Genus: Bachia
- Species: B. psamophila

Binomial name
- Bachia psamophila Rodrigues, Pavan, & Curcio, 2007

Species of lizard

Bachia psamophila is a species of lizard in the family Gymnophthalmidae. It is endemic to Brazil.
