= Bachia lineata =

Scientific classification
- Kingdom: Animalia
- Phylum: Chordata
- Class: Reptilia
- Order: Squamata
- Family: Gymnophthalmidae
- Genus: Bachia
- Species: B. lineata

Binomial name
- Bachia lineata (Boulenger, 1903)

Species of lizard

Bachia lineata is a species of lizard in the family Gymnophthalmidae. It is endemic to Venezuela.
