= Bachia didactyla =

Scientific classification
- Domain: Eukaryota
- Kingdom: Animalia
- Phylum: Chordata
- Class: Reptilia
- Order: Squamata
- Family: Gymnophthalmidae
- Genus: Bachia
- Species: B. didactyla

Binomial name
- Bachia didactyla (de Freitas, Strüssmann, M. de Carvalho, Kawashita-Ribeiro, & Mott, 2011)

Species of lizard

Bachia didactyla is a species of lizard in the family Gymnophthalmidae. It is endemic to Brazil.
