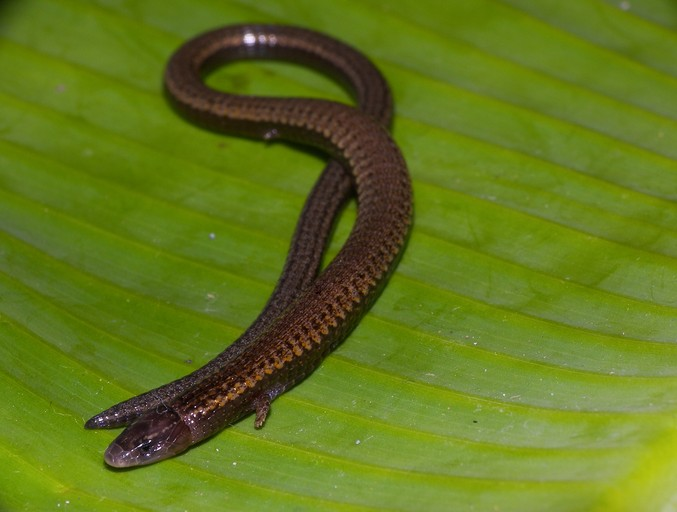

Conservation status
- Least Concern (IUCN 3.1)

Scientific classification
- Kingdom: Animalia
- Phylum: Chordata
- Class: Reptilia
- Order: Squamata
- Family: Gymnophthalmidae
- Genus: Bachia
- Species: B. bicolor

Binomial name
- Bachia bicolor (Cope, 1896)

= Bachia bicolor =

Species of lizard

Bachia bicolor, the two-colored bachia, is a species of lizard in the family Gymnophthalmidae. It is found in Venezuela and Colombia.
