= Oreosaurus luctuosus =

Scientific classification
- Kingdom: Animalia
- Phylum: Chordata
- Class: Reptilia
- Order: Squamata
- Family: Gymnophthalmidae
- Genus: Oreosaurus
- Species: O. luctuosus

Binomial name
- Oreosaurus luctuosus (Peters, 1863)

Synonyms
- Ecpleopus luctuosus; Proctoporus luctuosus; Riama luctuosa

Species of lizard

Oreosaurus luctuosus, the lightbulb lizard, is a species of lizard in the family Gymnophthalmidae. It is endemic to Venezuela.
