= Bachia pallidiceps =

Conservation status
- Data Deficient (IUCN 3.1)

Scientific classification
- Kingdom: Animalia
- Phylum: Chordata
- Class: Reptilia
- Order: Squamata
- Suborder: Lacertoidea
- Family: Gymnophthalmidae
- Genus: Bachia
- Species: B. pallidiceps

Binomial name
- Bachia pallidiceps (Cope, 1862)

Species of lizard

Bachia pallidiceps, Cope's bachia, is a species of lizard in the family Gymnophthalmidae. It is found in Costa Rica, Colombia, and Panama.
