= Bachia whitei =

Conservation status
- Data Deficient (IUCN 3.1)

Scientific classification
- Kingdom: Animalia
- Phylum: Chordata
- Class: Reptilia
- Order: Squamata
- Family: Gymnophthalmidae
- Genus: Bachia
- Species: B. whitei

Binomial name
- Bachia whitei Murphy, Salvi, Santos, Braswell, Charles, Borzee, & Jowers, 2019

Species of lizard

Bachia whitei, White's bachia, is a species of lizard in the family Gymnophthalmidae. It is endemic to Tobago.
