= Roy Wallace McDiarmid =

American botanist and herpetologist

- Born: 18 February 1940 (age 85); Santa Monica, California, U.S.
- Known for: Research on Neotropical amphibians and reptiles
- Scientific career
- Fields: Herpetology
- Institutions: University of South Florida; Smithsonian Institution; United States Geological Survey

Roy Wallace McDiarmid (born 18 February 1940) is an American herpetologist.

== Biography ==
McDiarmid grew up in Whittier, California. As a teenager, he collected amphibians and snakes and kept exotic pets, including South American coatis and slow lorises.

After earning his Bachelor’s degree in 1961, McDiarmid completed his Master of Science in 1966 at the University of Southern California with the thesis A study in biogeography: The herpetofauna of the Pacific lowlands of western Mexico. In 1968, he received his Ph.D. from the same university with the dissertation Comparative morphology and evolution of the neotropical frog genera Atelopus, Dendrophryniscus, Melanophryniscus, Oreophrynella and Brachycephalus.

McDiarmid’s research has focused primarily on the systematics, behavior, ecology, and biogeography of amphibians and reptiles in the Neotropics. He has published more than 150 scientific papers and several books, including Snake Species of the World: A Taxonomic and Geographic Reference (with Jonathan A. Campbell and T'Shaka A. Touré), Measuring and Monitoring Biological Diversity: Standard Methods for Amphibians (with Ronald Heyer and Maureen A. Donnelly), Tadpoles: The Biology of Anuran Larvae (with Ronald Altig), Handbook of Larval Amphibians of the United States and Canada (with Ronald Altig), and Reptile Biodiversity.

His early work focused on the herpetofauna of the dry forests of western Mexico, including a project with the Museo de Zoología of the Universidad Nacional Autónoma de México, where he studied newly discovered frog species and their tadpoles. In 1966, as part of a program of the Organization for Tropical Studies (OTS), he studied rainforest habitats in Costa Rica, and since then he has conducted most of his fieldwork in the tropics. McDiarmid organized and led several OTS courses in the late 1960s and early 1970s. After a short time at the University of Chicago, he moved to Tampa and became a faculty member at the University of South Florida, where he taught from 1968 to 1978. During that time, he chaired a subcommittee of the Florida Committee on Rare and Endangered Plants and Animals, which published the book Rare and Endangered Biota of Florida 3: Amphibians and Reptiles in 1979.

In 1976, McDiarmid spent six months in Ecuador conducting a tropical ecology program for the University of South Florida. In 1978, he joined the Smithsonian Institution in Washington, D.C., as a curator at the National Museum of Natural History. Since 2008, he has been an emeritus scientist at the Patuxent Wildlife Research Center of the United States Geological Survey.

McDiarmid was among the describers of the reptile species Anolis neblininus (1993), Arthrosaura synaptolepis (1992), Atractus heyeri (2015), Bachia pyburni (1998), Mitophis asbolepis (1985), Mitophis calypso (1985), and Mitophis leptipileptus (1985). In 2007, he established the genus Nymphargus in the family glass frogs.

== Eponyms and honors ==
Several species have been named in his honor, including the frogs Allobates mcdiarmidi and Rulyrana mcdiarmidi, and the microteiid lizard Oreosaurus mcdiarmidi. In 2013, McDiarmid received the Henry S. Fitch Award for Excellence in Herpetology from the American Society of Ichthyologists and Herpetologists (ASIH).
