= Bachia heteropa =

Conservation status
- Least Concern (IUCN 3.1)

Scientific classification
- Kingdom: Animalia
- Phylum: Chordata
- Class: Reptilia
- Order: Squamata
- Family: Gymnophthalmidae
- Genus: Bachia
- Species: B. heteropa

Binomial name
- Bachia heteropa (Wiegmann, 1856)

Synonyms
- Chalcides heteropus Wiegmann, 1856; Bachia heteropus — Garman, 1892; Bachia lineata Boulenger, 1903; Scolecosaurus trinitatis Barbour, 1914; Bachia heteropa — Ruthven, 1925

Species of lizard

Bachia heteropa is a species of "microteiid" lizard in the family Gymnophthalmidae. The species is native to the Caribbean and northern South America. There are two recognized subspecies.

== Common names ==
Common names for B. heteropa include La Guaira bachia, LaGuaira bachia, and worm lizard (in English), and falsa vibora común and lagartija lombriz (in Spanish).

== Geographic range ==
The distribution of B. heteropa includes Colombia, Trinidad and Tobago, and Venezuela.

== Description ==
B. heteropa can reach a length of 64 mm (2.5 in) snout-to-vent, and its tail may be more than 1.5 times that long. Its limbs are very small relative to its body length. It has four digits on each forelimb, and two digits on each hindlimb. Its body is covered by rows of large, overlapping, hexagonal scales.

== Habitat ==
B. heteropa lives in forests, at altitudes from sea level to 700 m (2,300 ft), where it dwells in leaf-litter.

== Diet ==
B. heteropa feeds on arthropods and their larvae.

== Reproduction ==
B. heteropa is oviparous.

== Subspecies ==
Two subspecies of Bachia heteropa are recognized as being valid, including the nominotypical subspecies.

- Bachia heteropa heteropa (Wiegmann, 1856)
- Bachia heteropa marcelae Donoso-Barros & Garrido, 1964

Nota bene: A trinomial authority in parentheses indicates that the subspecies was originally described in a genus other than Bachia.
