= Oreosaurus =

Scientific classification
- Kingdom: Animalia
- Phylum: Chordata
- Class: Reptilia
- Order: Squamata
- Family: Gymnophthalmidae
- Genus: Oreosaurus; Peters, 1862

Genus of lizards

Oreosaurus is a genus of lizards in the family Gymnophthalmidae. The genus is found in South America.

== Species ==
The genus Oreosaurus contains 7 species which are recognized as being valid.

- Oreosaurus achlyens (Uzzell, 1958)
- Oreosaurus bisbali Rivas, Sales-Nunes, Baran, Jowers, Smith, Hernandez-Morales, & Schargel, 2021
- Oreosaurus luctuosus (Peters, 1863) - lightbulb lizard
- Oreosaurus mcdiarmidi Kok & Rivas, 2011
- Oreosaurus rhodogaster Rivas, Schargel, & Meik, 2005
- Oreosaurus serranus Sanchez-Pacheco, Sales-Nunes, Marques-Souza, Rodrigues, & Murphy, 2017
- Oreosaurus shrevei (Parker, 1935) - Shreve's lightbulb lizard

Nota bene: A binomial authority in parentheses indicates that the species was originally described in a genus other than Oreosaurus.
