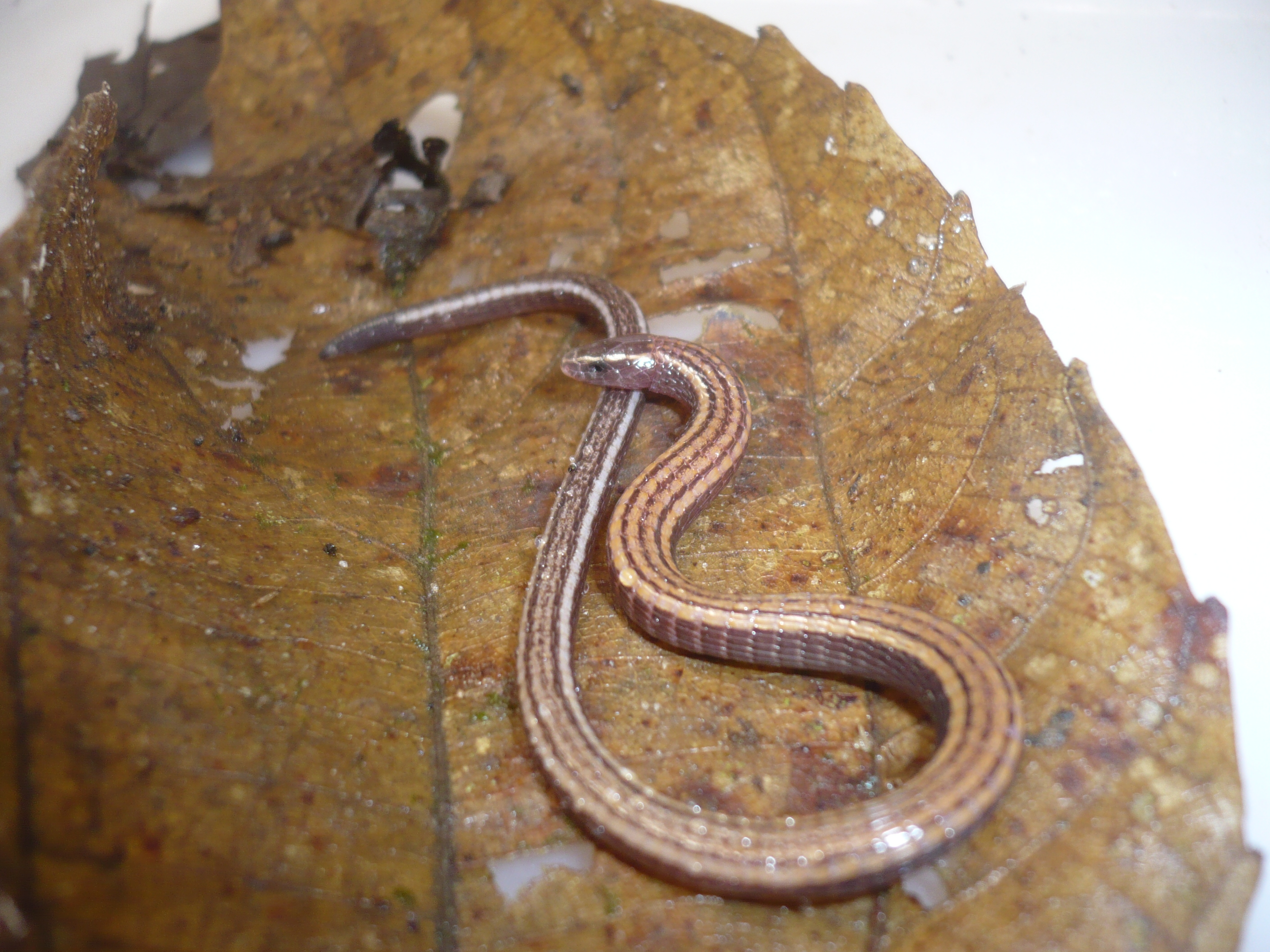

Conservation status
- Least Concern (IUCN 3.1)

Scientific classification
- Kingdom: Animalia
- Phylum: Chordata
- Class: Reptilia
- Order: Squamata
- Family: Gymnophthalmidae
- Genus: Bachia
- Species: B. dorbignyi

Binomial name
- Bachia dorbignyi (A.M.C. Duméril & Bibron, 1839)

Synonyms
- Chalcides dorbignyi A.M.C. Duméril & Bibron, 1839; Bachia dorbignyi —Gray, 1845; Cophias dorbignyi — Boulenger, 1885; Bachia dorbignyi — Garman, 1892

= Bachia dorbignyi =

Species of lizard

Bachia dorbignyi, also known commonly as Dorbigny's bachia and lagarto-sem-pata in Brazilian Portuguese, is a species of lizard in the family Gymnophthalmidae. The species is native to central South America.

== Etymology ==
The specific name, dorbignyi, is in honor of French Naturalist Alcide d'Orbigny.

== Geographic range ==
B. dorbignyi is found in eastern Bolivia, western Brazil, and southeastern Peru.

== Habitat ==
The preferred natural habitats of B. dorbignyi are forest and savanna.

== Reproduction ==
B. dorbignyi is oviparous.
