= Bachia trisanale =

Conservation status
- Least Concern (IUCN 3.1)

Scientific classification
- Kingdom: Animalia
- Phylum: Chordata
- Class: Reptilia
- Order: Squamata
- Family: Gymnophthalmidae
- Genus: Bachia
- Species: B. trisanale

Binomial name
- Bachia trisanale (Cope, 1868)

Synonyms
- Ophiognomon trisanale Cope, 1868; Bachia trisanale — Duellman, 1978

Species of lizard

Bachia trisanale, also known commonly as Stacy's bachia, is a species of lizard in the family Gymnophthalmidae. The species is endemic to South America. There are three recognized subspecies.

== Geographic range ==
B. trisanale is found in Bolivia, Brazil, Colombia, Ecuador, and Peru.

== Habitat ==
The preferred natural habitat of B. trisanale is forest.

== Description ==
B. trisanale has very small rudimentary legs. Each front leg has three terminal tubercles instead of digits. The back legs are minute and styliform. There are three elongate parallel anal plates, to which the specific name refers. Adults have a snout-to-vent length (SVL) of about 6.5 cm (2.6 in). The tail is very long, longer than SVL.

== Reproduction ==
B. trisanale is oviparous.

== Subspecies ==
The following three subspecies are recognized as being valid, including the nominotypical subspecies.

- Bachia trisanale abendrothii (W. Peters, 1871)
- Bachia trisanale trisanale (Cope, 1868)
- Bachia trisanale vermiformis (Cope, 1874)

Nota bene: A trinomial authority in parentheses indicates that the subspecies was originally described in a genus other than Bachia.

== Etymology ==
The subspecific name, abendrothii, is in honor of German arachnologist Ernst Robert Abendroth (1810–1871).
