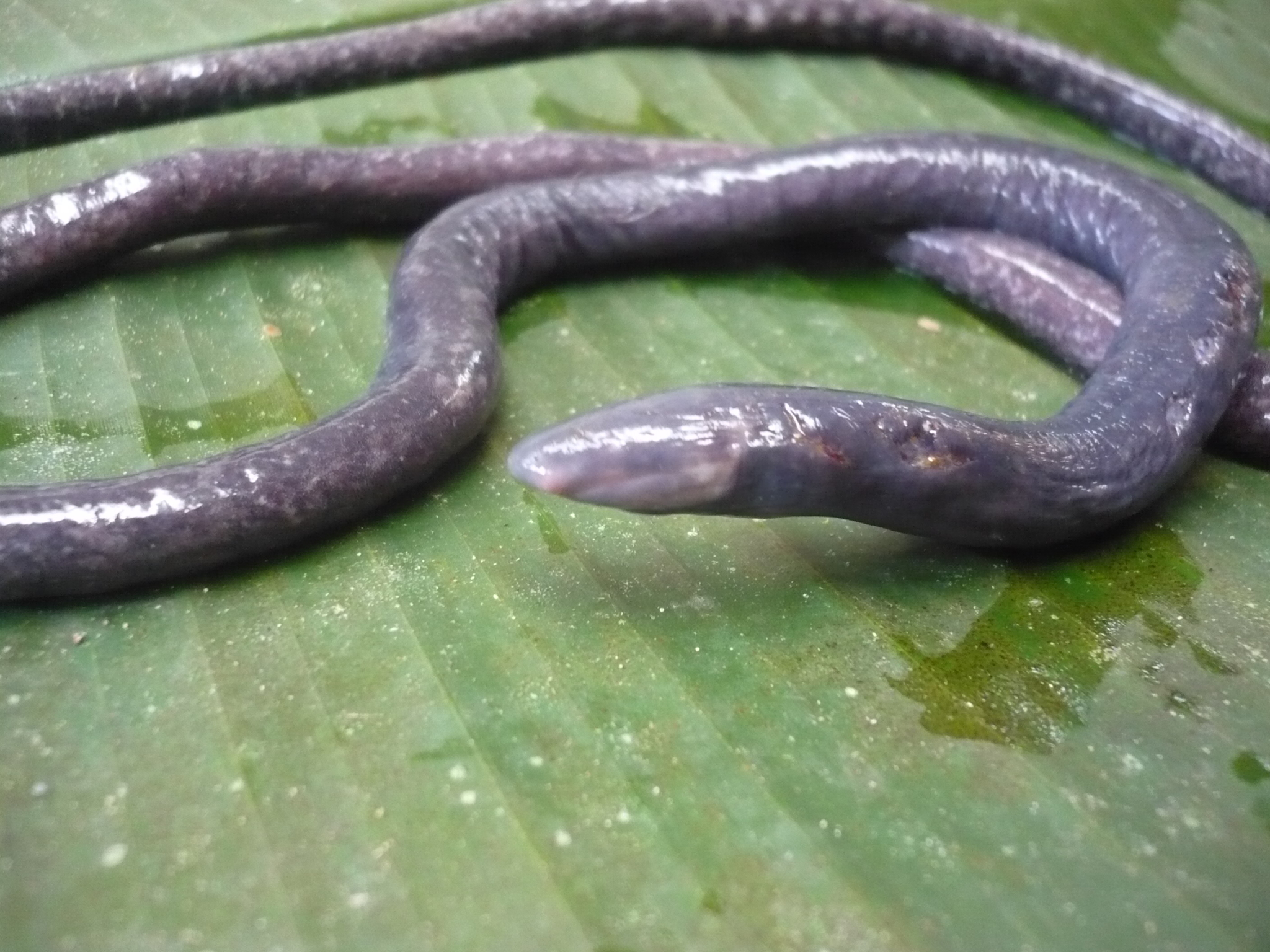

Conservation status
- Least Concern (IUCN 3.1)

Scientific classification
- Kingdom: Animalia
- Phylum: Chordata
- Class: Amphibia
- Order: Gymnophiona
- Clade: Apoda
- Family: Caeciliidae
- Genus: Oscaecilia
- Species: O. bassleri

Binomial name
- Oscaecilia bassleri (Dunn, 1942)
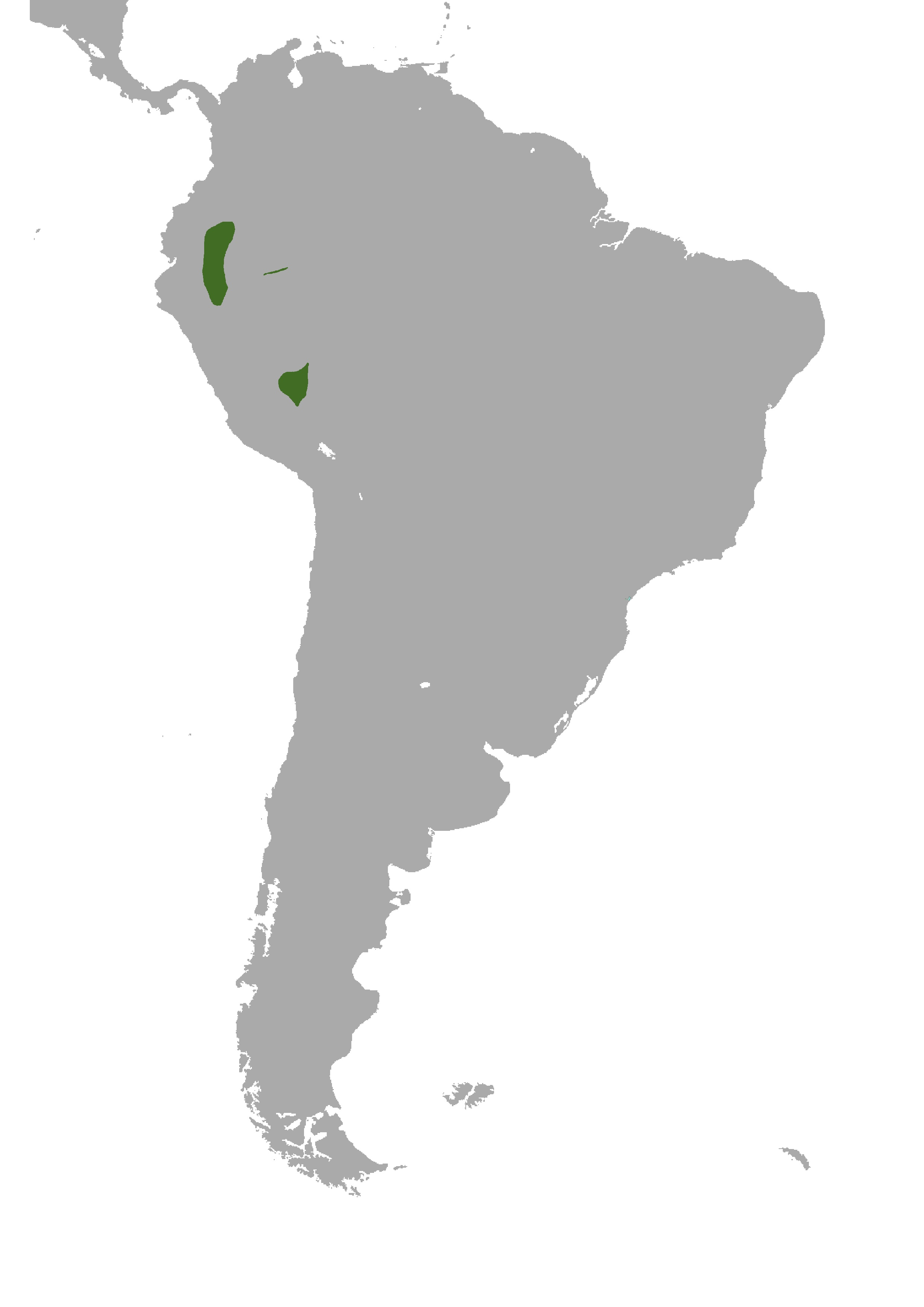

Synonyms
- Caecilia bassleri Dunn, 1942

= Oscaecilia bassleri =

Species of amphibian

Oscaecilia bassleri, also known as the Pastaza River caecilian, is a species of caecilian in the family Caeciliidae. It is known from the lower Amazonian slopes and western Amazon Basin in Ecuador and Peru, but its range might extend into Bolivia and Colombia. The specific name bassleri honors Harvey Bassler, an American geologist and paleontologist.

Oscaecilia bassleri is a subterranean species occurring in primary tropical rainforest at elevations of 100–800 m (330–2,620 ft) above sea level.
