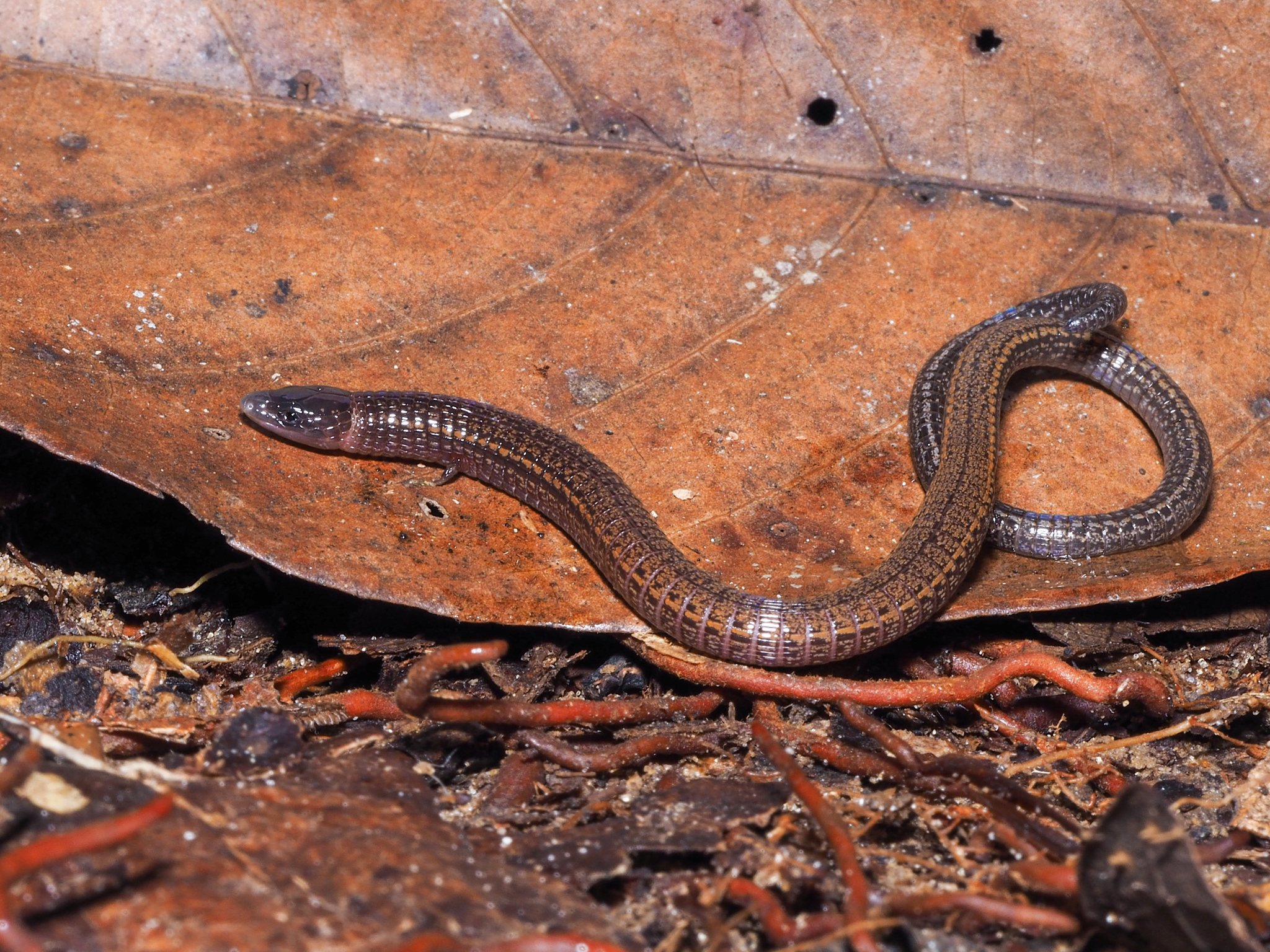
- B. flavescens in French Guiana

Conservation status
- Least Concern (IUCN 3.1)

Scientific classification
- Kingdom: Animalia
- Phylum: Chordata
- Class: Reptilia
- Order: Squamata
- Suborder: Lacertoidea
- Family: Gymnophthalmidae
- Genus: Bachia
- Species: B. flavescens

Binomial name
- Bachia flavescens (Bonnaterre, 1789)

= Bachia flavescens =

Species of lizard

Bachia flavescens is a species of lizard in the family Gymnophthalmidae. It is found in Colombia, Venezuela, Guyana, Suriname, French Guiana, Tobago, and Brazil.
