= Bachia alleni =

Scientific classification
- Kingdom: Animalia
- Phylum: Chordata
- Class: Reptilia
- Order: Squamata
- Family: Gymnophthalmidae
- Genus: Bachia
- Species: B. alleni

Binomial name
- Bachia alleni (Barbour, 1914)

Synonyms
- Brachypus cuvieri Fitzinger, 1826 (nomen nudum); Scolecosaurus cuvieri — Boulenger, 1885; Scolecosaurus alleni Barbour, 1914; Bachia cuvieri — Vanzolini, 1961; Bachia alleni — Thomas, 1965; Bachia heteropa alleni — Dixon, 1973; Bachia alleni — Powell & Henderson, 2017

Species of lizard

Bachia alleni is a species of lizard in the family Gymnophthalmidae. The species is endemic to the southern Caribbean.

== Etymology ==
The specific name, alleni, is in honor of American Zoologist Glover Morrill Allen.

The specific name, cuvieri (of the synonym, Bachia cuvieri), is in honor of French naturalist Georges Cuvier.

== Geographic range ==
B. alleni is found in Grenada, the Grenadines, and Tobago.

== Reproduction ==
B. alleni is oviparous.
