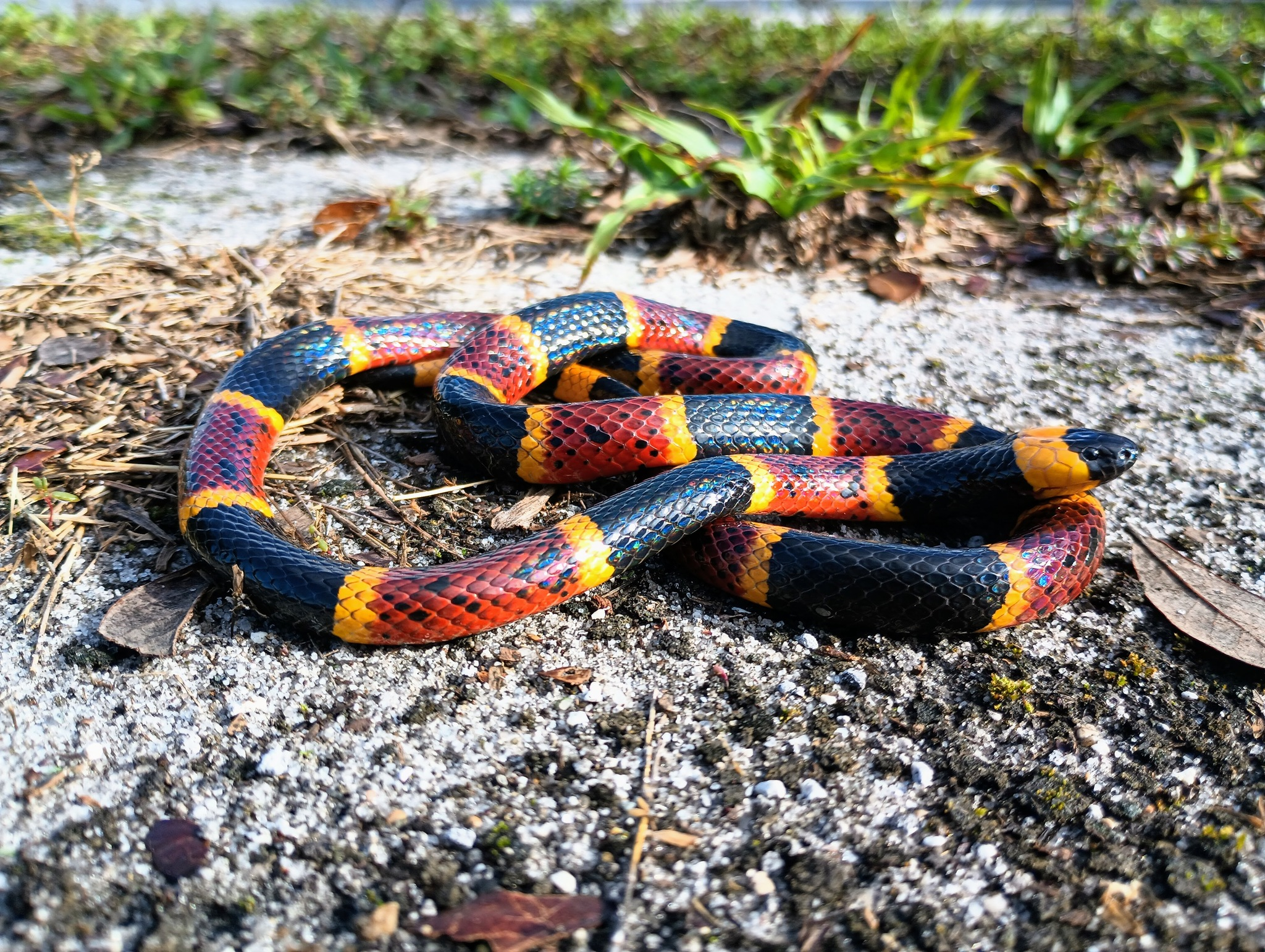
- Eastern coral snake (Micrurus fulvius)

Scientific classification
- Kingdom: Animalia
- Phylum: Chordata
- Class: Reptilia
- Order: Squamata
- Suborder: Serpentes
- Superfamily: Elapoidea
- Family: Elapidae

= Coral snake =

Large group of elapid snakes

Coral snakes are a large group of elapid snakes that can be divided into two distinct groups, the Old World coral snakes and New World coral snakes. There are 27 species of Old World coral snakes, in three genera (Calliophis, Hemibungarus, and Sinomicrurus), and 83 recognized species of New World coral snakes, in two genera (Micruroides and Micrurus). Phylogenetic studies suggest that the group originated in the Old World. While new world species of both genera are venomous, their bites are seldom lethal; as of 2018, only two confirmed fatalities had been documented in the United States in the preceding 100 years from the genus Micrurus. Meanwhile, snakes of the genus Micruroides have never caused a medically significant bite.

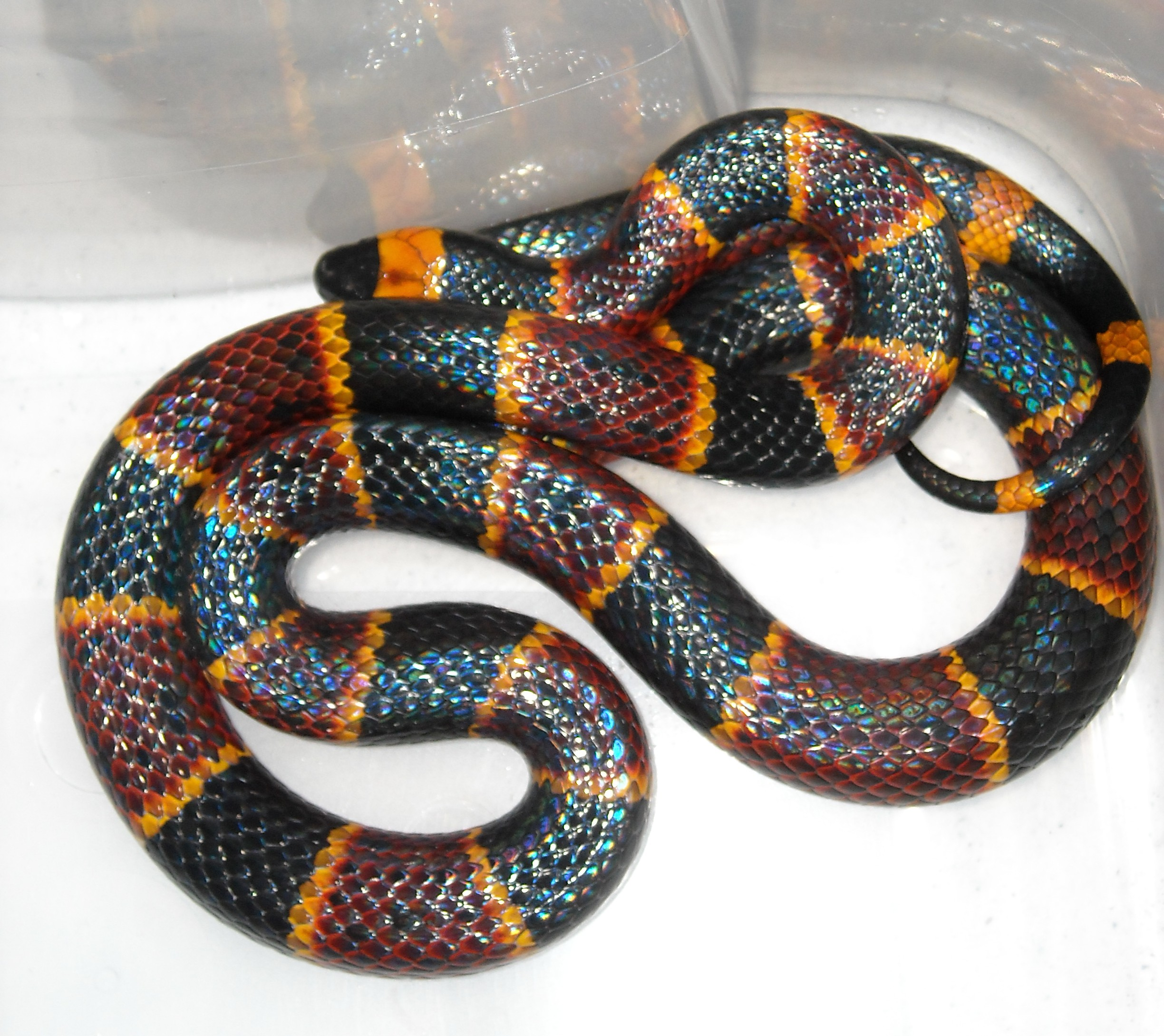
Eastern coral snake (Micrurus fulvius)

== Distribution ==
New World coral snakes (genera Micruroides and Micrurus) range from the Southern United States to Argentina. Old World coral snakes (genera Calliophis, Hemibungarus, and Sinomicrurus) live in Asia and Africa.

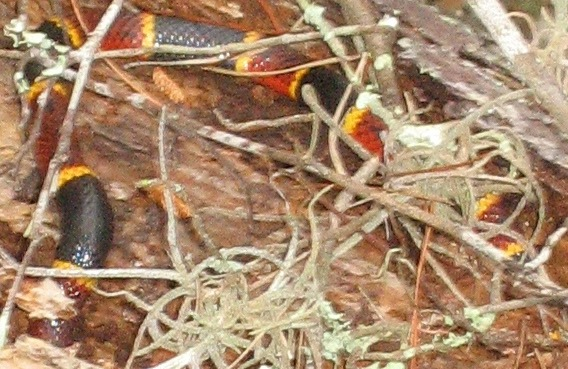
Coral snake showing typically reclusive behavior of hiding under rotting wood. This one was over 75 cm (30 in) long, but less than 25 mm (1 in) across.

== Behavior ==
Coral snakes vary widely in their behavior, but most are very elusive, fossorial (burrowing) snakes which spend most of their time buried beneath the ground or in the leaf litter of a rainforest floor, coming to the surface only when it rains or during breeding season. Some species, like Micrurus surinamensis, are almost entirely aquatic and spend most of their lives in slow-moving bodies of water that have dense vegetation.

Coral snakes feed mostly on smaller snakes, lizards, frogs, nestling birds, small rodents, etc. Tropical species of coral snakes from more mesic areas have a broader diet, feeding on elongate prey like eels and caecilians.

Like all elapid snakes, coral snakes possess a pair of small hollow fangs to deliver their venom. The fangs are positioned at the front of the mouth. The fangs are fixed in position rather than retractable, and rather than being directly connected to the venom duct, they have a small groove through which the venom enters the base of the fangs. Because the fangs are relatively small and inefficient for venom delivery, rather than biting quickly and letting go like vipers, coral snakes tend to hold onto their prey and make chewing motions when biting. The neurotoxic venom takes time to reach full effect, affecting the nervous system and weakening the muscles.

Coral snakes are not aggressive or prone to biting and account for less than one percent of the total number of snake bites each year in the United States. The life span of coral snakes in captivity is about seven years.

== Reproduction ==
The breeding season occurs from spring to early summer and late summer to early fall. A study investigating how climate influences the reproductive cycle discovered that coral snake species with ranges occurring closer to the equator display more continuous reproductive cycles, while species in colder regions display more seasonal cycles.

== Old World ==
=== Genus Calliophis ===
Species in this genus are:

- Calliophis beddomei (M.A. Smith, 1943) – Beddome's coral snake (India)
- Calliophis bibroni (Jan, 1858) – Bibron's coral snake (India)
- Calliophis bilineatus (W. Peters, 1881)
- Calliophis bivirgatus (F. Boie, 1827) – blue Malaysian coral snake (Indonesia, Cambodia, Malaysia, Singapore, Thailand)
- Calliophis castoe E.N. Smith, Ogale, Deepak & Giri, 2012 – Castoe's coral snake (India)
- Calliophis gracilis (Gray, 1835) – spotted coral snake (Thailand, Malaysia, Indonesia, Singapore)
- Calliophis haematoetron E.N. Smith, Manamendra-Arachchi & Somaweera, 2008 – blood-bellied coral snake (Sri Lanka)
- Calliophis intestinalis (Laurenti, 1768) – banded Malaysian coral snake (Indonesia, Malaysia)
- Calliophis maculiceps (Günther, 1858) – speckled coral snake (Myanmar, Thailand, Malaysia, Vietnam, Cambodia, Laos)
- Calliophis melanurus (Shaw, 1802) – Indian coral snake (India, Bangladesh, Sri Lanka)
- Calliophis nigrescens (Günther, 1862) – black coral snake (India)
- Calliophis nigrotaeniatus (W. Peters, 1863)
- Calliophis philippinus (Günther, 1864)
- Calliophis salitan R.M. Brown, Smart, Leviton & E.N. Smith, 2018 – Dinagat Island Banded Coralsnake (Philippines)
- Calliophis suluensis (Steindachner, 1891)

Nota bene: A binomial authority in parentheses indicates that the species was originally described in a genus other than Calliophis.

=== Genus Hemibungarus ===
Species in this genus are:

- Hemibungarus calligaster (Wiegmann, 1835) – barred coral snake (Philippines)
- Hemibungarus gemianulis W. Peters, 1872 – (Philippines)
- Hemibungarus mcclungi Taylor, 1922

=== Genus Sinomicrurus ===
Species in this genus are:

- Sinomicrurus annularis (Günther, 1864)
- Sinomicrurus boettgeri (Fritze, 1894)
- Sinomicrurus iwasakii (Maki, 1935)
- Sinomicrurus japonicus (Günther, 1868) – Japanese coral snake (Ryukyu Islands)
- Sinomicrurus kelloggi (Pope, 1928) – Kellogg's coral snake (Vietnam, Laos, China)
- Sinomicrurus macclellandi (J.T. Reinhardt, 1844) – Macclelland's coral snake (India, Nepal, Myanmar, Thailand, Vietnam, China, Ryukyu Islands, Taiwan)
- Sinomicrurus peinani Liu, Yan, Hou, Wang, S.N. Nguyen, R. Murphy, Che & Guo, 2020
- Sinomicrurus sauteri (Steindachner, 1913) (Taiwan)
- Sinomicrurus swinhoei (Van Denburgh, 1912)

== New World ==
=== Genus Micruroides ===
- Micruroides euryxanthus (Kennicott, 1860) – Arizona coral snake (lowland regions from Arizona to Sinaloa, Mexico)
  - Micruroides euryxanthus australis Zweifel & Norris, 1955
  - Micruroides euryxanthus euryxanthus (Kennicott, 1860)
  - Micruroides euryxanthus neglectus Roze, 1967

=== Genus Micrurus ===
Nota bene: In the following list, a binomial authority or a trinomial authority in parentheses indicates that the species or subspecies was originally described in a genus other than Micrurus.

- Micrurus albicinctus Amaral, 1925 – white-banded coral snake
- Micrurus alleni K.P. Schmidt, 1936 – Allen's coral snake (eastern Nicaragua, Costa Rica, and Panama)
  - Micrurus alleni alleni K.P. Schmidt, 1936
- Micrurus altirostris (Cope, 1860) (Brazil, Uruguay, and northeastern Argentina)
- Micrurus ancoralis Jan, 1872 – regal coral snake (southeastern Panama, western Colombia, and western Ecuador)
  - Micrurus ancoralis ancoralis Jan 1872
  - Micrurus ancoralis jani K.P. Schmidt, 1936
- Micrurus annellatus (W. Peters, 1871) – annellated coral snake (southeastern Ecuador, eastern Peru, Bolivia, and western Brazil)
  - Micrurus annellatus annellatus (W. Peters, 1871)
  - Micrurus annellatus balzanii (Boulenger, 1898)
  - Micrurus annellatus bolivianus Roze, 1967
- Micrurus averyi K.P. Schmidt, 1939 – black-headed coral snake
- Micrurus baliocoryphus (Cope, 1860) – Mesopotamian coral snake
- Micrurus bernadi (Cope, 1887) (Mexico)
- Micrurus bocourti (Jan 1872) – Ecuadorian coral snake (western Ecuador to northern Colombia)
- Micrurus bogerti Roze, 1967 – Bogert's coral snake (Oaxaca)
- Micrurus boicora Bernarde, Turci, Abegg & Franco, 2018 – boicora coral snake
- Micrurus brasiliensis Roze, 1967 – Brazilian short-tailed coral snake
- Micrurus browni K.P. Schmidt & H.M. Smith, 1943 – Brown's coral snake (Quintana Roo to Honduras)
  - Micrurus browni browni K.P. Schmidt & H.M. Smith, 1943
  - Micrurus browni importunus Roze, 1967
  - Micrurus browni taylori K.P. Schmidt & H.M. Smith, 1943
- Micrurus camilae Renjifo & Lundberg, 2003 (Colombia)
- Micrurus catamayensis Roze, 1989 – Catamayo coral snake (Catamayo Valley of Ecuador)
- Micrurus clarki K.P. Schmidt, 1936 – Clark's coral snake (southeastern Costa Rica to western Colombia)
- Micrurus collaris (Schlegel, 1837) – Guyana blackback coral snake (northern South America)
  - Micrurus collaris collaris (Schlegel, 1837)
  - Micrurus collaris breviventris Roze & Bernal-Carlo, 1987
- Micrurus corallinus (Merrem, 1820) – painted coral snake
- Micrurus decoratus (Jan 1858) – Brazilian coral snake
- Micrurus diana Roze, 1983 – Diana's coral snake
- Micrurus diastema (A.M.C. Duméril, Bibron & A.H.A. Duméril, 1854) – variable coral snake
  - Micrurus diastema aglaeope (Cope, 1859)
  - Micrurus diastema alienus (F. Werner, 1903)
  - Micrurus diastema affinis (Jan 1858)
  - Micrurus diastema apiatus (Jan 1858)
  - Micrurus diastema diastema (A.M.C. Duméril, Bibron & A.H.A. Duméril, 1854)
  - Micrurus diastema macdougalli Roze, 1967
  - Micrurus diastema sapperi (F. Werner, 1903)
- Micrurus dissoleucus (Cope, 1860) – pygmy coral snake
  - Micrurus dissoleucus dissoleucus (Cope, 1860)
  - Micrurus dissoleucus dunni Barbour, 1923
  - Micrurus dissoleucus melanogenys (Cope, 1860)
  - Micrurus dissoleucus nigrirostris K.P. Schmidt, 1955
- Micrurus distans (Kennicott, 1860) – West Mexican coral snake
  - Micrurus distans distans (Kennicott, 1860)
  - Micrurus distans zweifeli Roze, 1967
- Micrurus diutius Burger, 1955 – Trinidad ribbon coral snake
- Micrurus dumerilii (Jan 1858)
  - Micrurus dumerilii antioquiensis K.P. Schmidt, 1936
  - Micrurus dumerilii carinicaudus K.P. Schmidt, 1936
  - Micrurus dumerilii colombianus (Griffin, 1916)
  - Micrurus dumerilii dumerilii (Jan 1858)
  - Micrurus dumerilii transandinus K.P. Schmidt, 1936
  - Micrurus dumerilii venezuelensis Roze, 1989
- Micrurus elegans (Jan 1858) – elegant coral snake
  - Micrurus elegans elegans (Jan 1858)
  - Micrurus elegans veraepacis K.P. Schmidt, 1933
- Micrurus ephippifer (Cope, 1886) – Oaxacan coral snake
  - Micrurus ephippifer ephippifer (Cope, 1886)
  - Micrurus ephippifer zapotecus Roze, 1989
- Micrurus filiformis (Günther, 1859) – slender coral snake
  - Micrurus filiformis filiformis (Günther, 1859)
  - Micrurus filiformis subtilis Roze, 1967
- Micrurus frontalis (A.M.C. Duméril, Bibron & A.H.A. Duméril, 1854) – southern coral snake (Brazil to northeastern Argentina)
  - Micrurus frontalis frontalis (A.M.C. Duméril, Bibron & A.H.A. Duméril, 1854)
  - Micrurus frontalis mesopotamicus Barrio & Miranda, 1967
- Micrurus fulvius (Linnaeus, 1766) – eastern coral snake (U.S. coastal plains of North Carolina to Louisiana)
- Micrurus hemprichii (Jan 1858) – Hemprich's coral snake, orange-banded coral snake
  - Micrurus hemprichii hemprichii (Jan 1858)
  - Micrurus hemprichii ortoni K.P. Schmidt, 1953
  - Micrurus hemprichii rondonianus Roze & Silva, 1990
- Micrurus hippocrepis (W. Peters, 1862) – Mayan coral snake
- Micrurus ibiboboca (Merrem, 1820) – Caatinga coral snake
- Micrurus isozonus (Cope, 1860) – Venezuela coral snake
- Micrurus langsdorffi (Wagler, 1824) – Langsdorff's coral snake
- Micrurus laticollaris (W. Peters, 1870) – Balsan coral snake
  - Micrurus laticollaris laticollaris (W. Peters, 1870)
  - Micrurus laticollaris maculirostris Roze, 1967
- Micrurus latifasciatus K.P. Schmidt, 1933 – broad-ringed coral snake
- Micrurus lemniscatus (Linnaeus, 1758) – South American coral snake (most of low-lying areas of South America)
  - Micrurus lemniscatus carvalhoi Roze, 1967
  - Micrurus lemniscatus frontifasciatus (F. Werner, 1927)
  - Micrurus lemniscatus helleri K.P. Schmidt & F.J.W. Schmidt, 1925
  - Micrurus lemniscatus lemniscatus (Linnaeus, 1758)
- Micrurus limbatus Fraser, 1964 – Tuxtlan coral snake
  - Micrurus limbatus limbatus Fraser, 1964
  - Micrurus limbatus spilosomus Pérez-Higareda & H.M. Smith, 1990
- Micrurus margaritiferus Roze, 1967 – speckled coral snake
- Micrurus medemi Roze, 1967 – Villavicencio coral snake
- Micrurus meridensis (Roze, 1989) – Mérida coral snake
- Micrurus mertensi K.P. Schmidt, 1936 – Merten's coral snake
- Micrurus michoacanensis (Dugès, 1891)
- Micrurus mipartitus (A.M.C. Duméril, Bibron & A.H.A. Duméril, 1854) – redtail coral snake
  - Micrurus mipartitus anomalus (Boulenger, 1896)
  - Micrurus mipartitus decussatus (A.M.C. Duméril, Bibron, & A.H.A. Duméril, 1854)
  - Micrurus mipartitus mipartitus (A.M.C. Duméril, Bibron & A.H.A. Duméril, 1854)
  - Micrurus mipartitus semipartitus (Jan 1858)
- Micrurus mosquitensis Schmidt, 1933 – Mosquito coral snake
- Micrurus multifasciatus (Jan 1858) – many-banded coral snake
  - Micrurus multifasciatus multifasciatus (Jan 1858)
  - Micrurus multifasciatus hertwigi (F. Werner, 1897)
- Micrurus multiscutatus Rendahl & Vestergren, 1940 – Cauca coral snake
- Micrurus narduccii (Jan, 1863) – Andean blackback coral snake
  - Micrurus narduccii narduccii (Jan 1863)
  - Micrurus narduccii melanotus (W. Peters, 1881)
- Micrurus nattereri (Schmidt, 1952) – Natterer's coral snake
- Micrurus nebularis Roze, 1989 – cloud forest coral snake
- Micrurus nigrocinctus (Girard, 1854) – Central American coral snake (Yucatan and Chiapas to Colombia as well as western Caribbean islands)
  - Micrurus nigrocinctus babaspul Roze, 1967
  - Micrurus nigrocinctus coibensis K.P. Schmidt, 1936
  - Micrurus nigrocinctus divaricatus (Hallowell, 1855)
  - Micrurus nigrocinctus nigrocinctus (Girard, 1854)
  - Micrurus nigrocinctus ovandoensis K.P. Schmidt & H.M. Smith, 1943
  - Micrurus nigrocinctus wagneri Mertens, 1941
  - Micrurus nigrocinctus yatesi Dunn, 1942
  - Micrurus nigrocinctus zunilensis K.P. Schmidt, 1932
- Micrurus obscurus (Jan 1872) – Bolivian coral snake
- Micrurus oligoanellatus (Ayerbe & Lopez, 2005) – Tambito's coral snake
- Micrurus oliveri Roze, 1967
- Micrurus ornatissimus (Jan 1858) – ornate coral snake
- Micrurus pacaraimae Morato de Carvalho, 2002 – Pacaraima coral snake
- Micrurus pachecogili Campbell, 2000 – Pueblan coral snake
- Micrurus paraensis da Cunha & Nascimento, 1973 – Pará coral snake
- Micrurus peruvianus K.P. Schmidt, 1936 – Peruvian coral snake
- Micrurus petersi Roze, 1967 – Peters' coral snake
- Micrurus potyguara Pires, Silva, Feitosa, Prudente, Pereira-Filho & Zaher, 2014 – Potyguara coral snake
- Micrurus proximans H.M. Smith & Chrapliwy, 1958 – Nayarit coral snake
- Micrurus psyches (Daudin, 1803) – Carib coral snake
  - Micrurus psyches circinalis (A.M.C. Duméril, Bibron & A.H.A. Duméril, 1854)
  - Micrurus psyches donosoi Hoge, Cordeiro & Romano, 1976
  - Micrurus psyches psyches (Daudin, 1803)
- Micrurus putumayensis Lancini, 1962 – Putumayo coral snake
- Micrurus pyrrhocryptus (Cope, 1862) – Argentinian coral snake (Argentina)
- Micrurus remotus Roze, 1987 – remote coral snake
- Micrurus renjifoi Lamar, 2003 – Renjifo’s coral snake
- Micrurus ruatanus (Günther, 1895) – Roatán coral snake
- Micrurus sangilensis Nicéforo-María, 1942 – Santander coral snake
- Micrurus scutiventris (Cope, 1869)
- Micrurus serranus (Harvey, Aparicio & Gonzalez, 2003)
- Micrurus silviae Di-Bernardo, Borges-Martins & Silva, 2007
- Micrurus spixii (Wagler, 1824) – Amazon coral snake
- Micrurus spurrelli (Boulenger, 1914)
- Micrurus steindachneri (F. Werner, 1901) – Steindachner's coral snake
  - Micrurus steindachneri orcesi Roze, 1967
  - Micrurus steindachneri steindachneri (F. Werner, 1901)
- Micrurus stewarti Barbour & Amaral, 1928 – Panamanian coral snake
- Micrurus stuarti Roze, 1967 – Stuart's coral snake
- Micrurus surinamensis (Cuvier, 1817) – aquatic coral snake
- Micrurus tener (Baird & Girard, 1853) – Texas coral snake (Texas and Louisiana south to Morelos and Guanajuato)
  - Micrurus tener fitzingeri (Jan 1858)
  - Micrurus tener maculatus Roze, 1967
  - Micrurus tener microgalbineus B.C. Brown & H.M. Smith, 1942
  - Micrurus tener tamaulipensis Lavin-Murcio & Dixon, 2004
  - Micrurus tener tener (Baird & Girard, 1853)
- Micrurus tikuna Feitosa, Silva, Pires, Zaher & Prudente, 2015
- Micrurus tricolor Hoge, 1956
- Micrurus tschudii (Jan 1858) – desert coral snake
  - Micrurus tschudii olssoni K.P. Schmidt & F.J.W. Schmidt, 1925
  - Micrurus tschudii tschudii (Jan 1858)

== Mimicry ==
New World coral snakes serve as models for their Batesian mimics, false coral snakes, snake species whose venom is less toxic, as well as for many nonvenomous snake species that bear superficial resemblances to them. Research shows that coral snake color patterns deter predators from attacking snake-shaped prey, and that in the absence of coral snakes, species mimicking coral snakes are indeed attacked more frequently. Species that appear visually similar to coral snakes include:

- Cemophora coccinea
- Chionactis palarostris
- Erythrolamprus aesculapii
- Erythrolamprus bizona
- Erythrolamprus ocellatus, Tobago false coral snake
- Lampropeltis elapsoides, scarlet kingsnake
- Lampropeltis pyromelana
- Lampropeltis triangulum, milk snake, including the following subspecies and others:
  - Lampropeltis triangulum amaura
  - Lampropeltis triangulum annulata
  - Lampropeltis triangulum campbelli
  - Lampropeltis triangulum gaigeae
  - Lampropeltis triangulum gentilis
  - Lampropeltis triangulum hondurensis
  - Lampropeltis triangulum multistrata
  - Lampropeltis triangulum syspila
- Lampropeltis zonata
- Lystrophis pulcher, tri-color hognose snake
- Oxyrhopus petola
- Oxyrhopus rhombifer, false coral snake
- Pliocercus elapoides, variegated false coral snake
- Rhinobothryum bovallii, coral mimic snake, false tree coral
- Rhinocheilus lecontei tessellatus
