= Calliophis salitan =

Conservation status
- Data Deficient (IUCN 3.1)

Scientific classification
- Kingdom: Animalia
- Phylum: Chordata
- Class: Reptilia
- Order: Squamata
- Suborder: Serpentes
- Family: Elapidae
- Genus: Calliophis
- Species: C. salitan

Binomial name
- Calliophis salitan Brown et al., 2018

Species of snake

Calliophis salitan is a species of venomous snake in the family Elapidae. It is endemic to the Philippines and known from Dinagat Island and Mindanao; the former is based on a small number of recent records whereas the latter is based on a museum specimen from 1887.

It is unique for its large size as well as its body coloration of a black head & neck with black & white bands along the width of the body, terminating at a bright orange tail. It is distinct from any other coral snake species in the Philippines or Sundas, but is most closely related to the blue coral snake complex (C. bivirgatus & C. intestinalis) of the Sunda Shelf. While it is known only from Dinagat Island and possibly Mindanao, it may also occur or have formerly occurred on other islands in the Sulu Archipelago.
