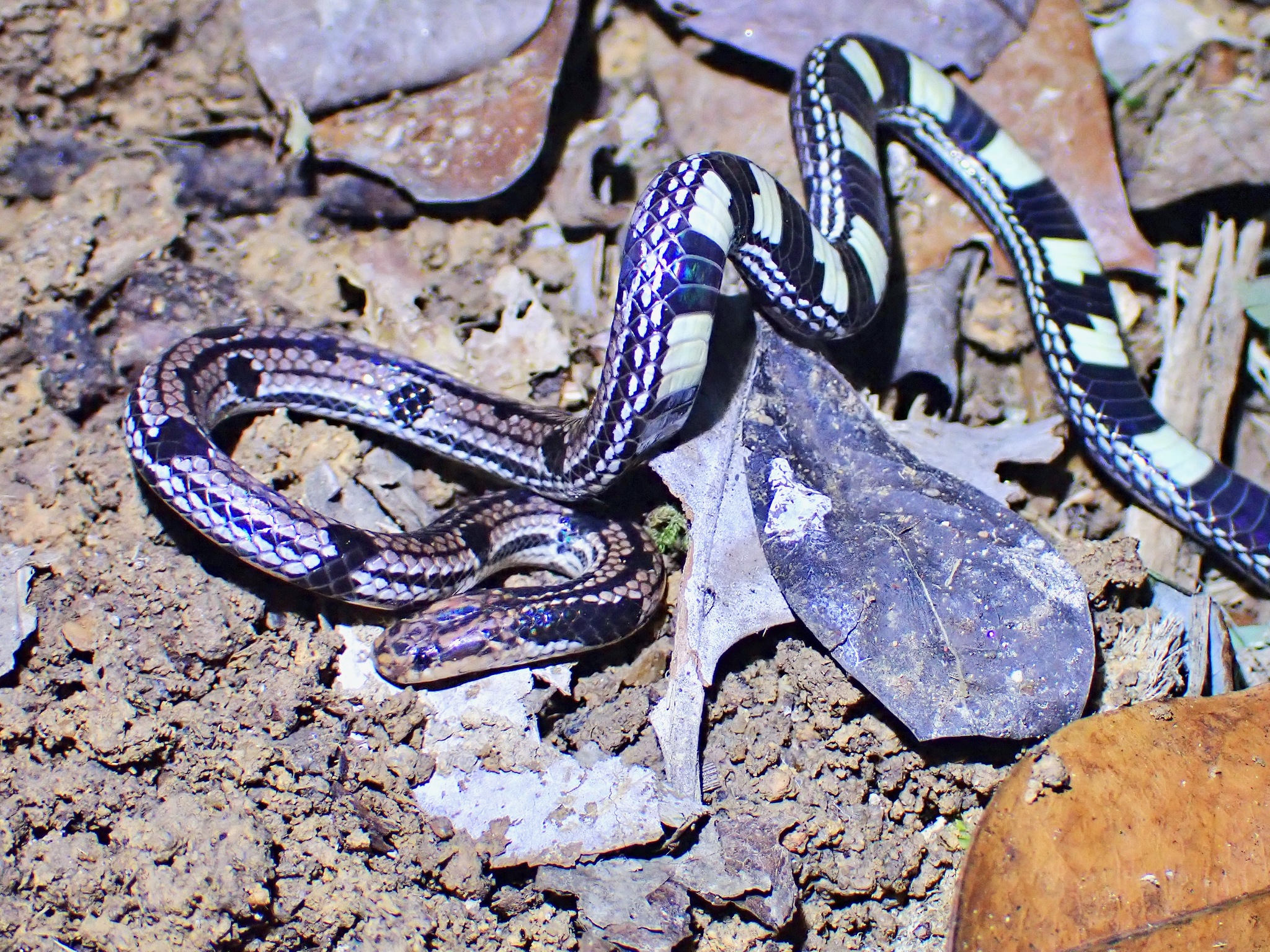

Conservation status
- Data Deficient (IUCN 3.1)

Scientific classification
- Kingdom: Animalia
- Phylum: Chordata
- Class: Reptilia
- Order: Squamata
- Suborder: Serpentes
- Family: Elapidae
- Genus: Calliophis
- Species: C. gracilis

Binomial name
- Calliophis gracilis Gray, 1835

= Calliophis gracilis =

Species of snake

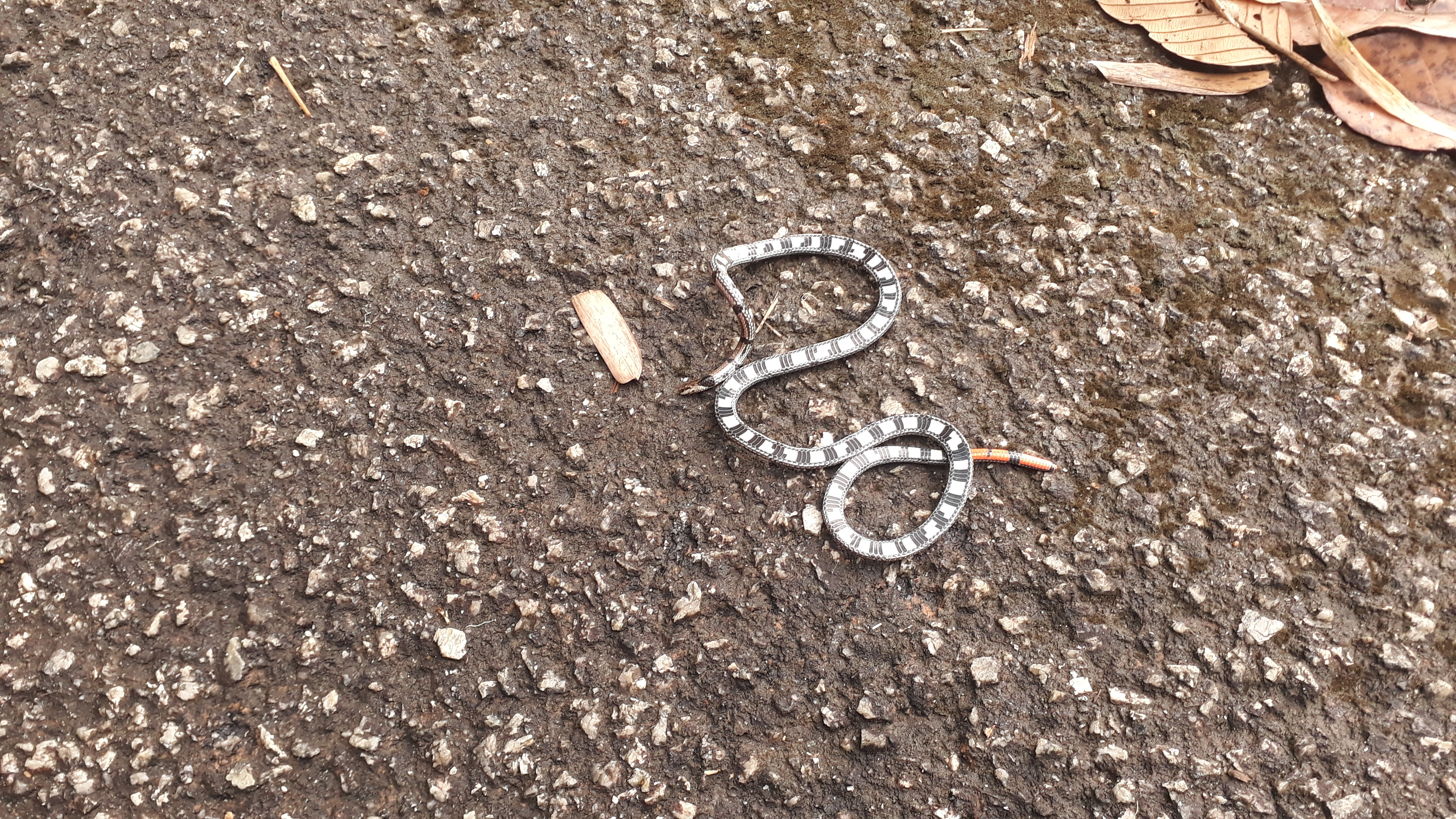
Calliophus gracilis

Calliophis gracilis, is a species of coral snake in the family Elapidae.
