= Micrurus filiformis =

Conservation status
- Least Concern (IUCN 3.1)

Scientific classification
- Kingdom: Animalia
- Phylum: Chordata
- Class: Reptilia
- Order: Squamata
- Suborder: Serpentes
- Family: Elapidae
- Genus: Micrurus
- Species: M. filiformis

Binomial name
- Micrurus filiformis (Günther, 1859)
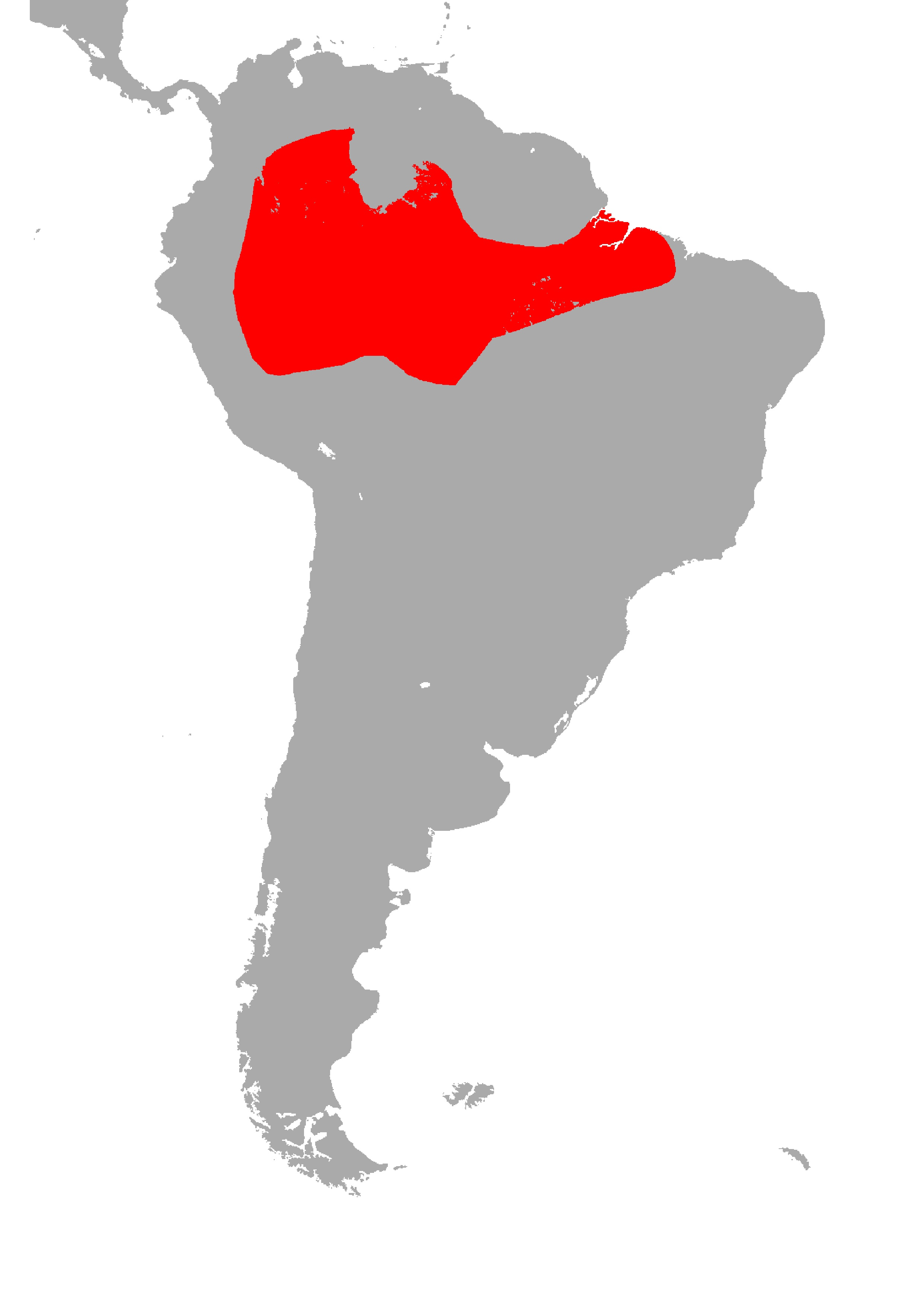

Synonyms
- Elaps filiformis Günther, 1859; Micrurus filiformis subtilis Roze, 1967

Species of snake

Micrurus filiformis, also known commonly as the slender coral snake and the thread coral snake, is a species of venomous snake in the family Elapidae. The species is native to northern South America. There are no recognized subspecies.

== Local common names ==
Local common names for Micrurus filiformis include cobra coral fio (meaning "wire coral snake") in Brazilian Portuguese, and coral hebra (meaning "strand coral snake") in South American Spanish.

== Description ==
In Günther's 1859 original description of Micrurus filiformis (as Elaps filiformis), he summarized its appearance as follows:

"Exceedingly slender. Only one posterior ocular shield. Body surrounded by black rings, always three together; muzzle, and a cross-band between the eyes, black."

The red rings, which alternate with the triads of black and white, are immaculate or have very few black-tipped scales. M. filiformis has a very high number of ventrals: 275–333 in females, and 270–316 in males. Medium-sized for the genus Micrurus, adults of M. filiformis usually have a total length (tail included) of 45–58 cm (18–23 in). The maximum recorded total length is 96 cm (38 in).

== Geographic distribution ==
Micrurus filiformis is found in northern Brazil, southern Colombia, and northern Peru.

== Habitat ==
The preferred natural habitats of Micrurus filiformis are forest and savanna, usually near streams, at elevations from near sea level to 400 m (1,300 ft).

== Behavior ==
Micrurus filiformis is terrestrial.

== Diet ==
Micrurus filiformis preys upon invertebrates, amphisbaenians, lizards, and snakes.

== Reproduction ==
Micrurus filiformis is oviparous.
