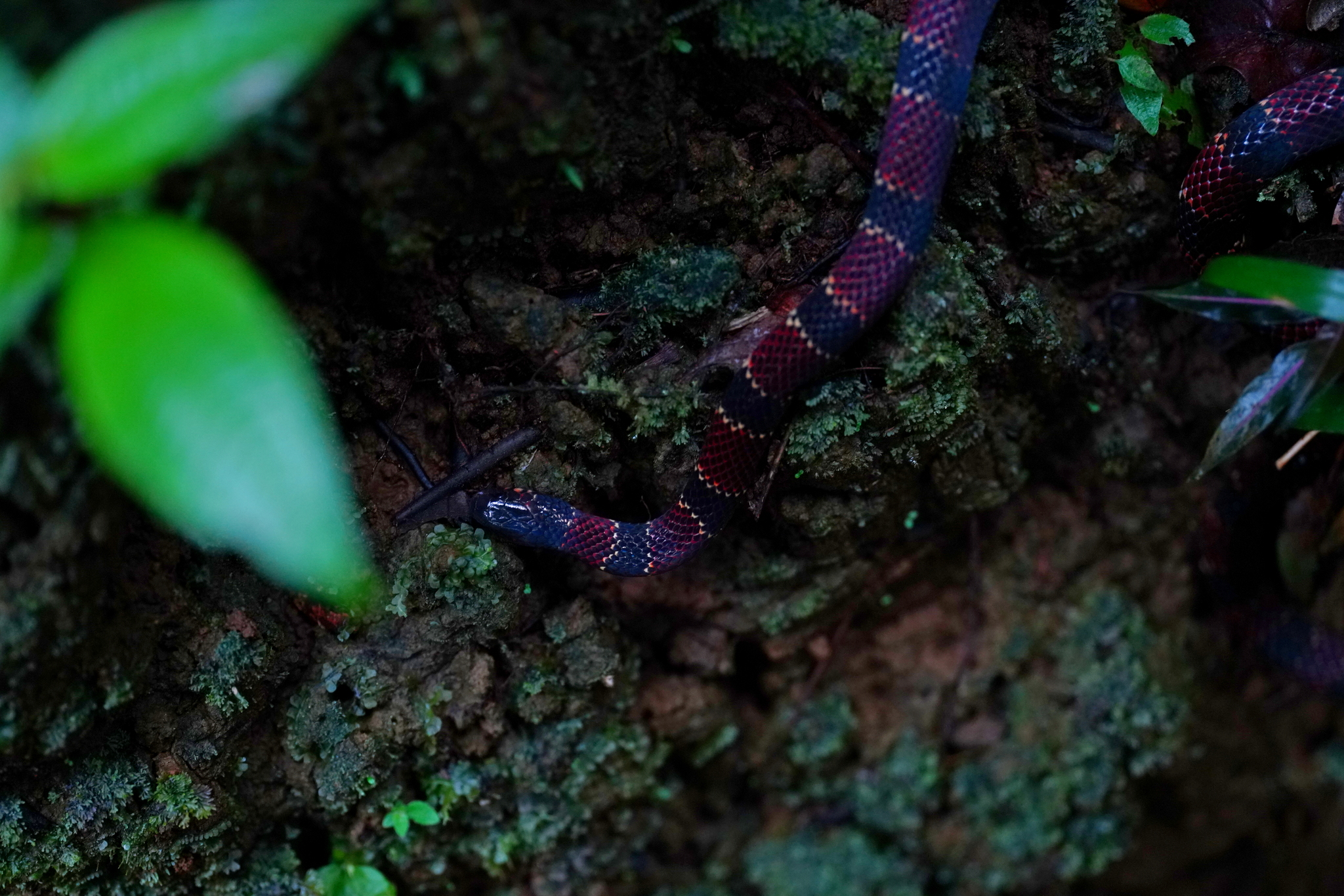

Conservation status
- Least Concern (IUCN 3.1)

Scientific classification
- Kingdom: Animalia
- Phylum: Chordata
- Class: Reptilia
- Order: Squamata
- Suborder: Serpentes
- Family: Elapidae
- Genus: Micrurus
- Species: M. ornatissimus

Binomial name
- Micrurus ornatissimus (Jan, 1858)
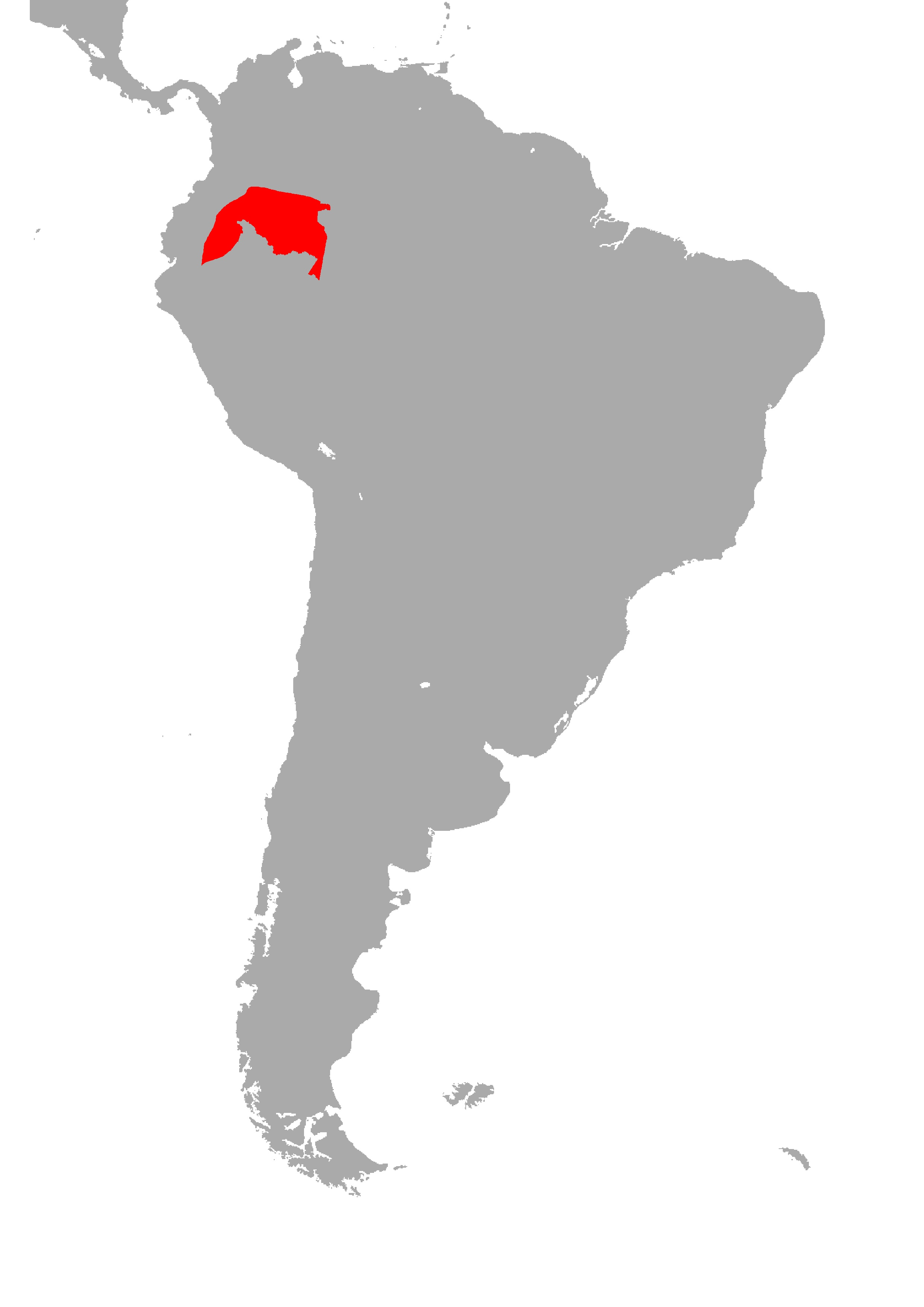

Synonyms
- Elaps ornatissimus Jan, 1858; Micrurus langsdorffi ornatissimus (Jan, 1858); Elaps buckleyi Boulenger, 1896

= Micrurus ornatissimus =

Species of snake

Micrurus ornatissimus, also known commonly as the ornate coral snake and la coral ornamentada in South American Spanish, is a species of venomous snake in the family Elapidae. The species is native to northwestern South America.

== Description ==
Micrurus ornatissimus is medium-sized for its genus. Adults usually have a total length (tail included) of 45–70 cm (18–28 in). The maximum recorded total length is 85 cm (33 in).

Like many New World coral snakes, the color pattern consist of red, black, and white rings. The red rings are slightly wider than the black rings. The black rings are not arranged in triads. The number of black rings on the body is very variable, from 38 to 67. The white rings, which separate the red from the black, are reduced to series of pearly dots, each dot covering half a dorsal scale. The white rings are complete ventrally, each covering one ventral.

Males have 201–211 ventrals and 47–52 subcaudals, and no supraanal tubercles. Females have 218–230 ventrals and 33–38 subcaudals.

== Geographic distribution ==
Specimens of Micrurus ornatissimus have been identified in regions of the Amazonian slopes of the Andes of southern Colombia, eastern Ecuador, and northern Peru.

== Habitat ==
The preferred natural habitat of Micrurus ornatissimus is forest, at elevations of 100–750 m (330–2,460 ft)

== Behavior ==
Micrurus ornatissimus is terrestrial, semi-fossorial, and nocturnal.

== Diet ==
Micrurus ornatissimus preys on snakes such as blind snakes.

== Reproduction ==
Micrurus ornatissimus is oviparous.

== Etymology ==
The specific name, ornatissimus, is Latin for "very ornate".

The specific name of Boulenger's synonym, buckleyi, is in honor of Clarence Buckley (1839–1889) who collected over 10,000 biological specimens in Ecuador for the British Museum.
