= Micrurus laticollaris =

Conservation status
- Least Concern (IUCN 3.1)

Scientific classification
- Kingdom: Animalia
- Phylum: Chordata
- Class: Reptilia
- Order: Squamata
- Suborder: Serpentes
- Family: Elapidae
- Genus: Micrurus
- Species: M. laticollaris

Binomial name
- Micrurus laticollaris (W. Peters, 1870)
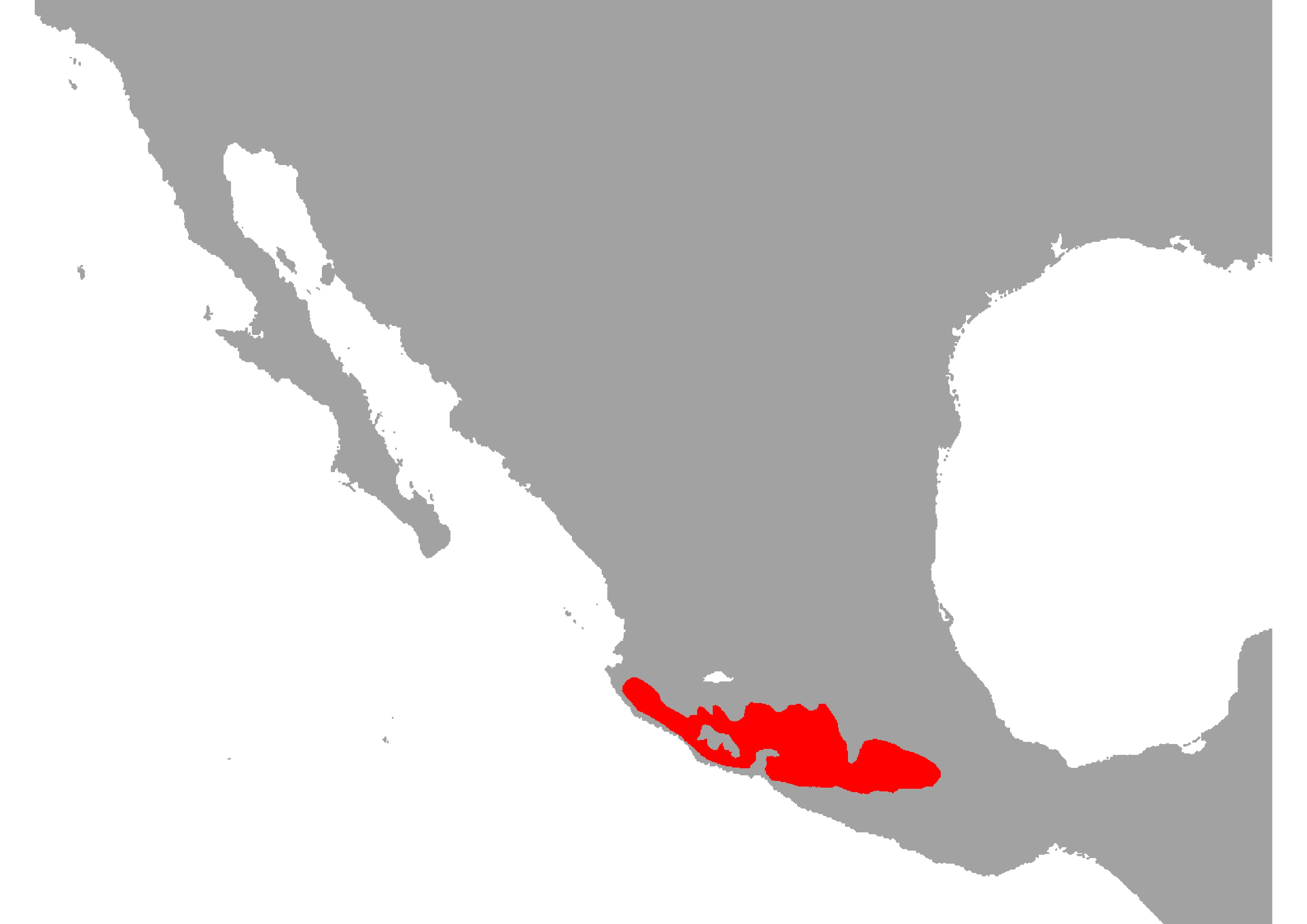

Synonyms
- Elaps marcgravii var. laticollaris W. Peters, 1870; Elaps laticollaris W. Peters, 1870

Species of snake

Micrurus laticollaris, also known commonly as the Balsan coral snake, the Balsas coral snake, and the double collar coral snake, is a species of venomous snake in the family Elapidae . The species is endemic to Mexico. There are two recognized subspecies.

== Local common names ==
Local common names for Micrurus laticollaris in Mexican Spanish include el coralillo de Balsas and el coralillo de doble collar.

== Description ==
Micrurus laticollaris is medium-sized for its genus. Adults usually have a total length (tail included) of 50–70 cm (20–28 in). The maximum recorded total length is 73 cm (29 in).

M. laticollaris has a color pattern consisting of red, yellow (or white), and black rings, with the black rings arranged in triads on the body. The first and last triads are incomplete, each containing only two black rings. The triads do not continue onto the tail, instead being replaced by alternating single black and yellow rings.

== Geographic distribution ==
Micrurus laticollaris is found in western Mexico, in the Mexican states of Colima, Guerrero, Jalisco, México, Michoacán, Morelos, Oaxaca, and Puebla.

== Habitat ==
The preferred natural habitat of Micrurus laticollaris is forest, at elevations of 300–1,800 m (980–5,910 ft).

== Behavior ==
Micrurus laticollaris is terrestrial.

== Reproduction ==
Micrurus laticollaris is oviparous.

== Subspecies ==
Two subspecies are recgnized as being valid, including the nominotypical subspecies.

- Micrurus laticollaris laticollaris (W. Peters, 1870)
- Micrurus laticollaris maculirostris Roze, 1967

Nota bene: A trinomial authority in parentheses indicates that the subspecies was originally described in a genus other than Micrurus.
