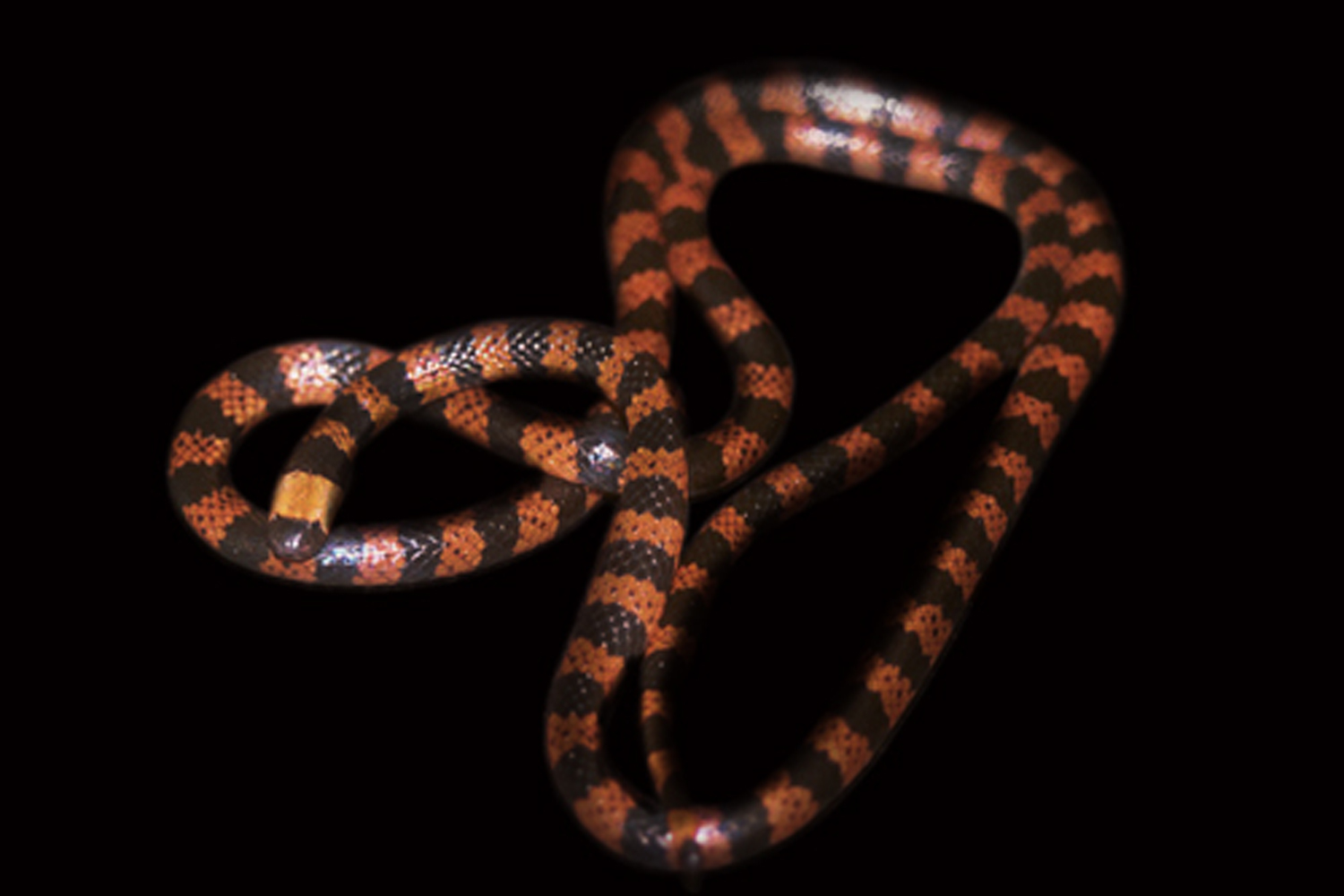

Conservation status
- Near Threatened (IUCN 3.1)

Scientific classification
- Kingdom: Animalia
- Phylum: Chordata
- Class: Reptilia
- Order: Squamata
- Suborder: Serpentes
- Family: Elapidae
- Genus: Micrurus
- Species: M. multiscutatus

Binomial name
- Micrurus multiscutatus Rendahl & Vestergren, 1940
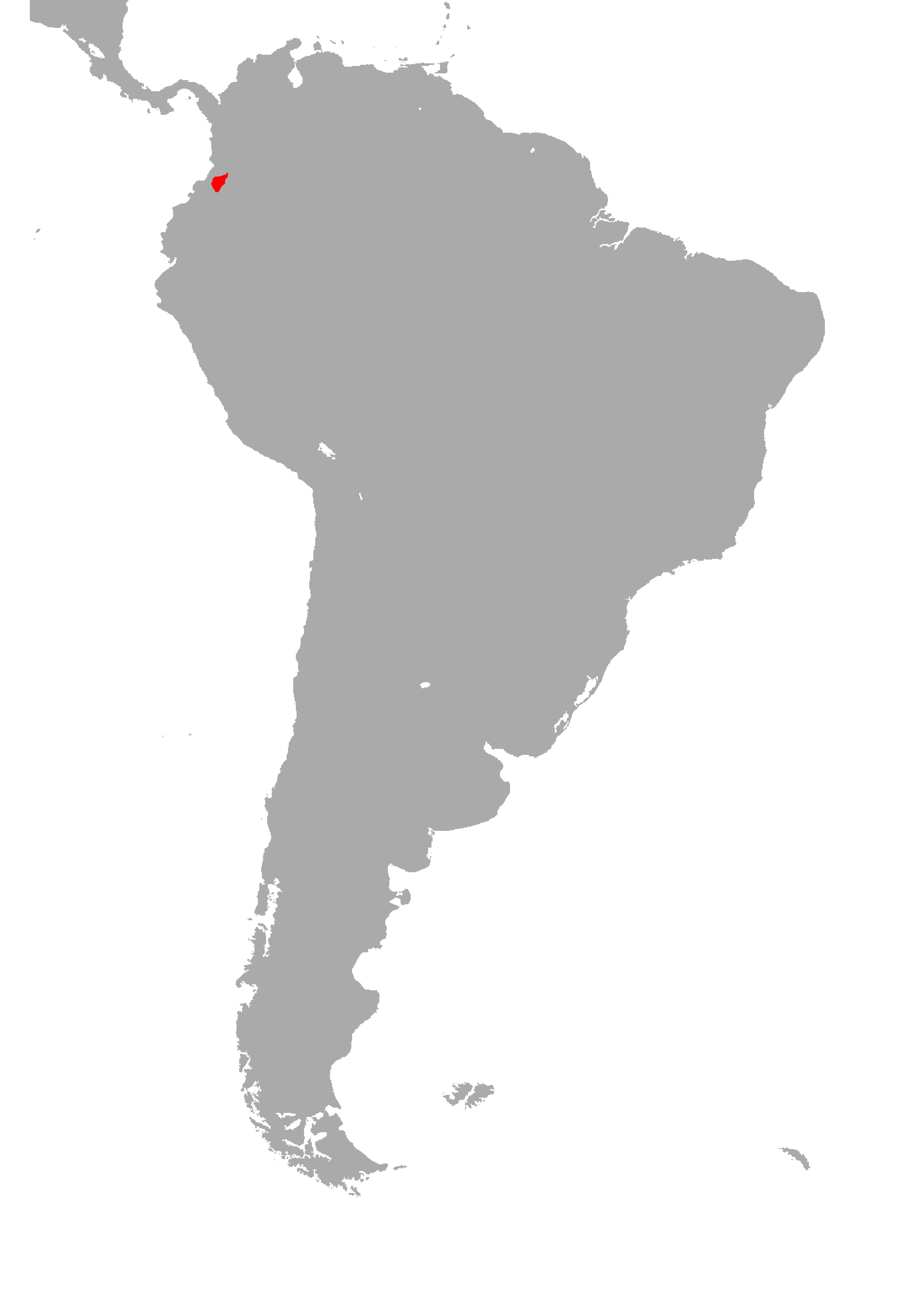

= Micrurus multiscutatus =

Species of snake

Micrurus multiscutatus, also known commonly as the Cauca coral snake and la coral caucana in South American Spanish, is a species of venomous snake in the family Elapidae. The species is native to nothwestern South America.

== Description ==
Micrurus multiscutatus has a very high number of ventral scales, to which the specific name refers. Females may have as many as 325 ventrals, males as many as 295.

M. multiscutatus is bicolored, its pattern consisting of alternating black and red rings. The rings are approximately equal in width. The red rings may be orangish and include some black-tipped dorsal scales.

Medium-sized for its genus, the holotype has a total length (tail included) of 84.2 cm (33.1 in).

== Geographic distribution ==
Micrurus multiscutatus is found in Colombia and Ecuador.

== Habitat ==
The preferred natural habitat of Micrurus multiscutatus is forest, at elevations of 100–1,500 m (330–4,920 ft).

== Behavior ==
Micrurus multiscutatus is terrestrial and fossorial, foraging underground and in leaf litter.

== Diet ==
Micrurus multifasciatus has been observed to prey upon caecilians.

== Reproduction ==
Micrurus multiscutatus is oviparous.
