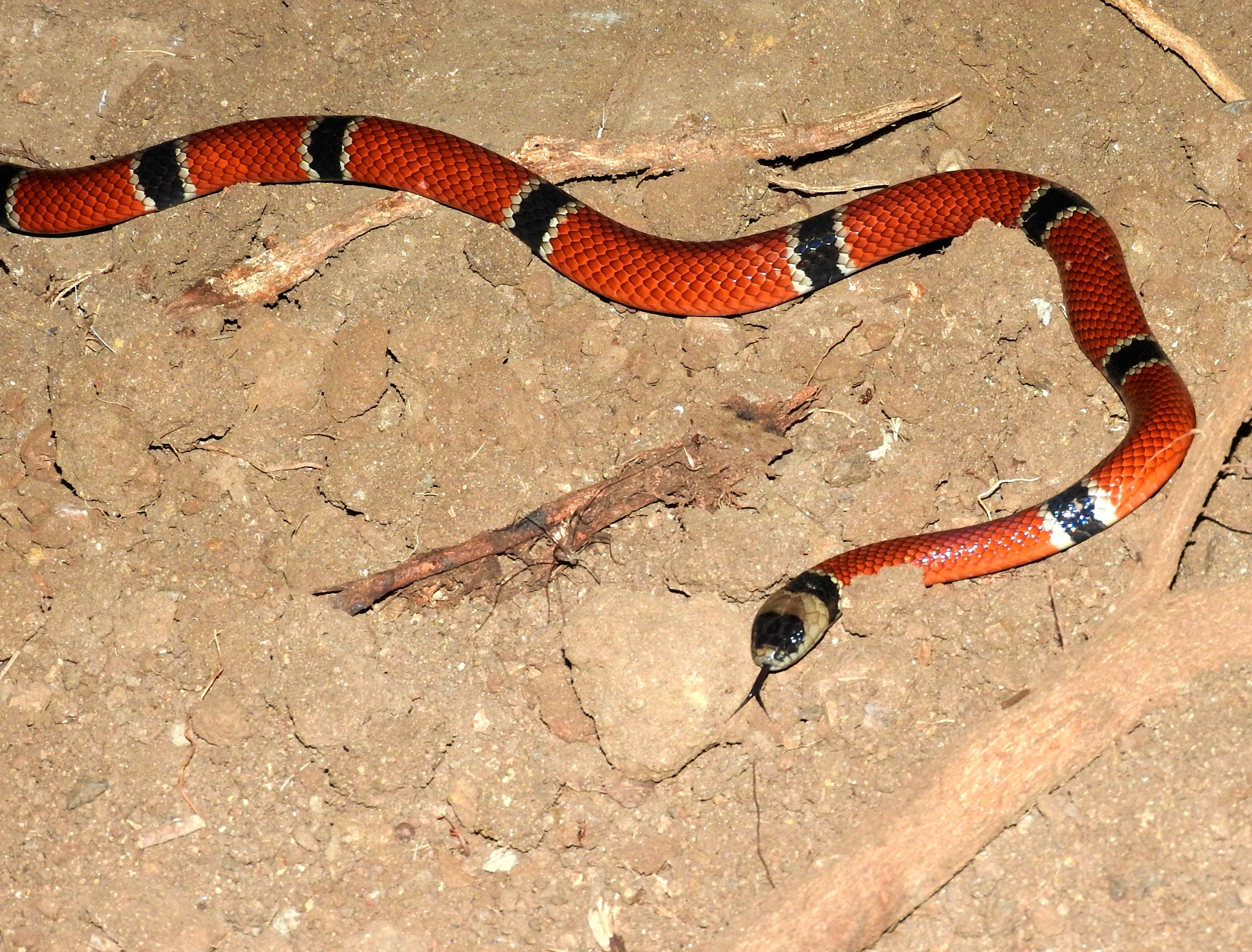

Conservation status
- Least Concern (IUCN 3.1)

Scientific classification
- Kingdom: Animalia
- Phylum: Chordata
- Class: Reptilia
- Order: Squamata
- Suborder: Serpentes
- Family: Elapidae
- Genus: Micrurus
- Species: M. distans

Binomial name
- Micrurus distans (Kennicott, 1860)
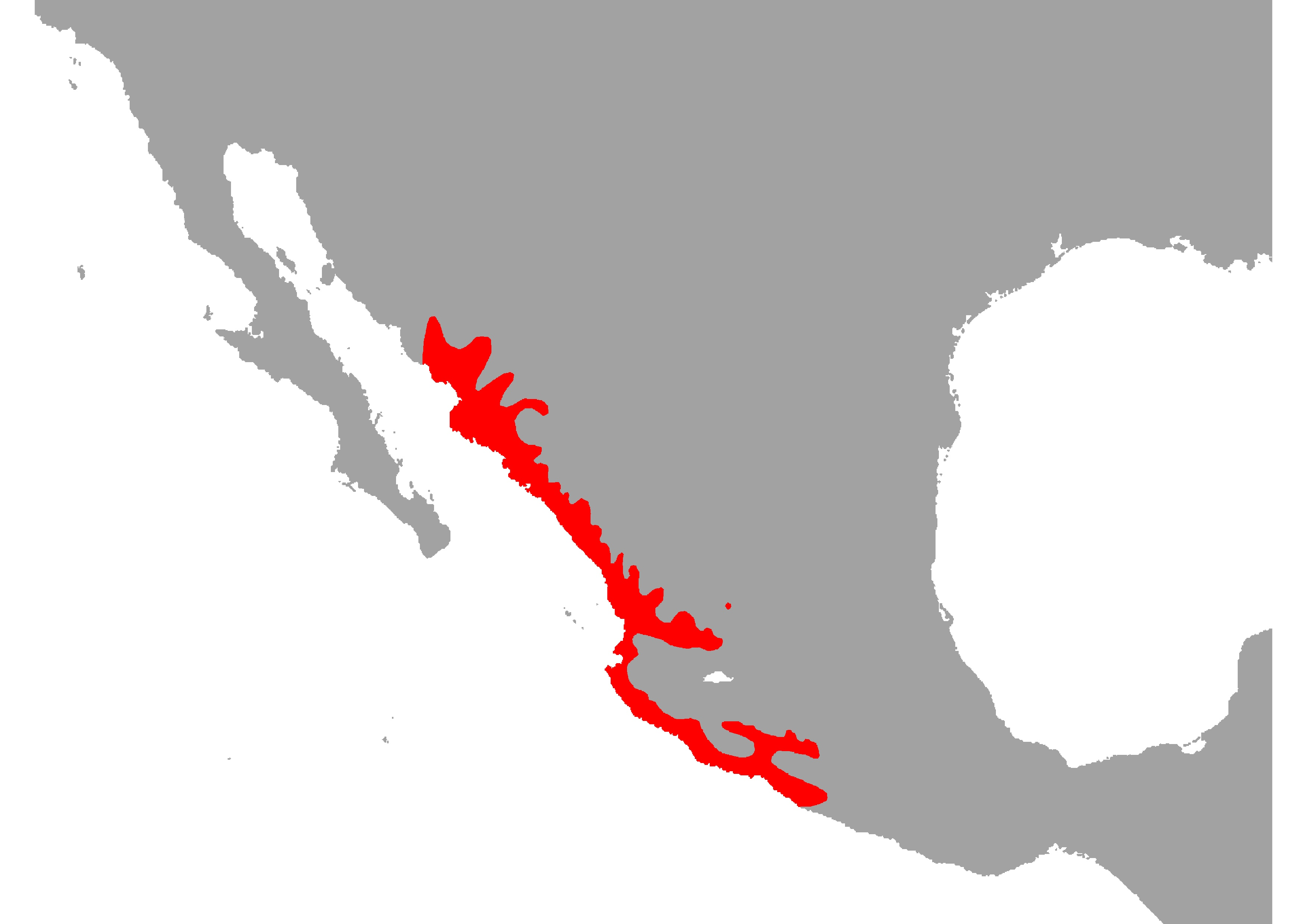

Synonyms
- Elaps distans Kennicott, 1860; Elaps fulvius var. distans Kennicott, 1860; Micrurus diastema distans (Kennicott, 1860)

= Micrurus distans =

Species of snake

Micrurus distans, also known commonly as the clear-banded coral snake and the West Mexican coral snake, is a species of venomous snake in the family Elapidae. The species is endemic to Mexico.

== Description ==
The color pattern of Micrurus distans consists of red, black, and yellow rings. The red rings are very wide, and the enclosed dorsal scales usually lack black tips, or have only a few. Adults usually have a total length (tail included) of 45–85 cm (18–33 in). The maximum recorded total length is 107.5 cm (42.3 in).

== Geographic distribution ==
Micrurus distans is found in the western Mexican states of Aguascalientes, Chihuahua, Colima, Jalisco, Michoacán, Nayarit, Sinaloa, Sonora, and Zacatecas

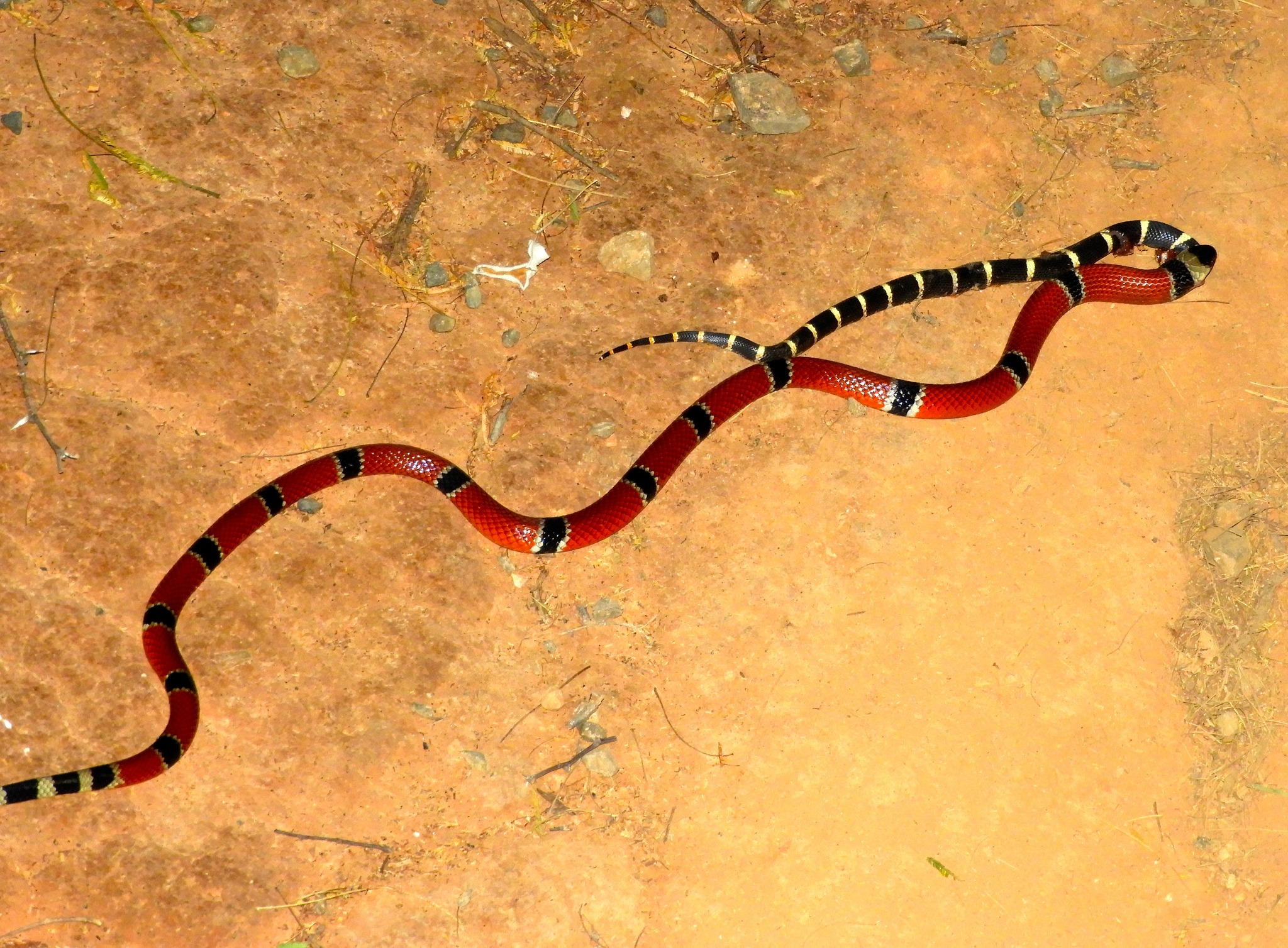
Eating another snake

== Habitat ==
The preferred natural habitat of Micrurus distans is forest.

== Behavior ==
Micrurus distans is terrestrial and fossorial.

== Reproduction ==
Micrurus distans is oviparous.
