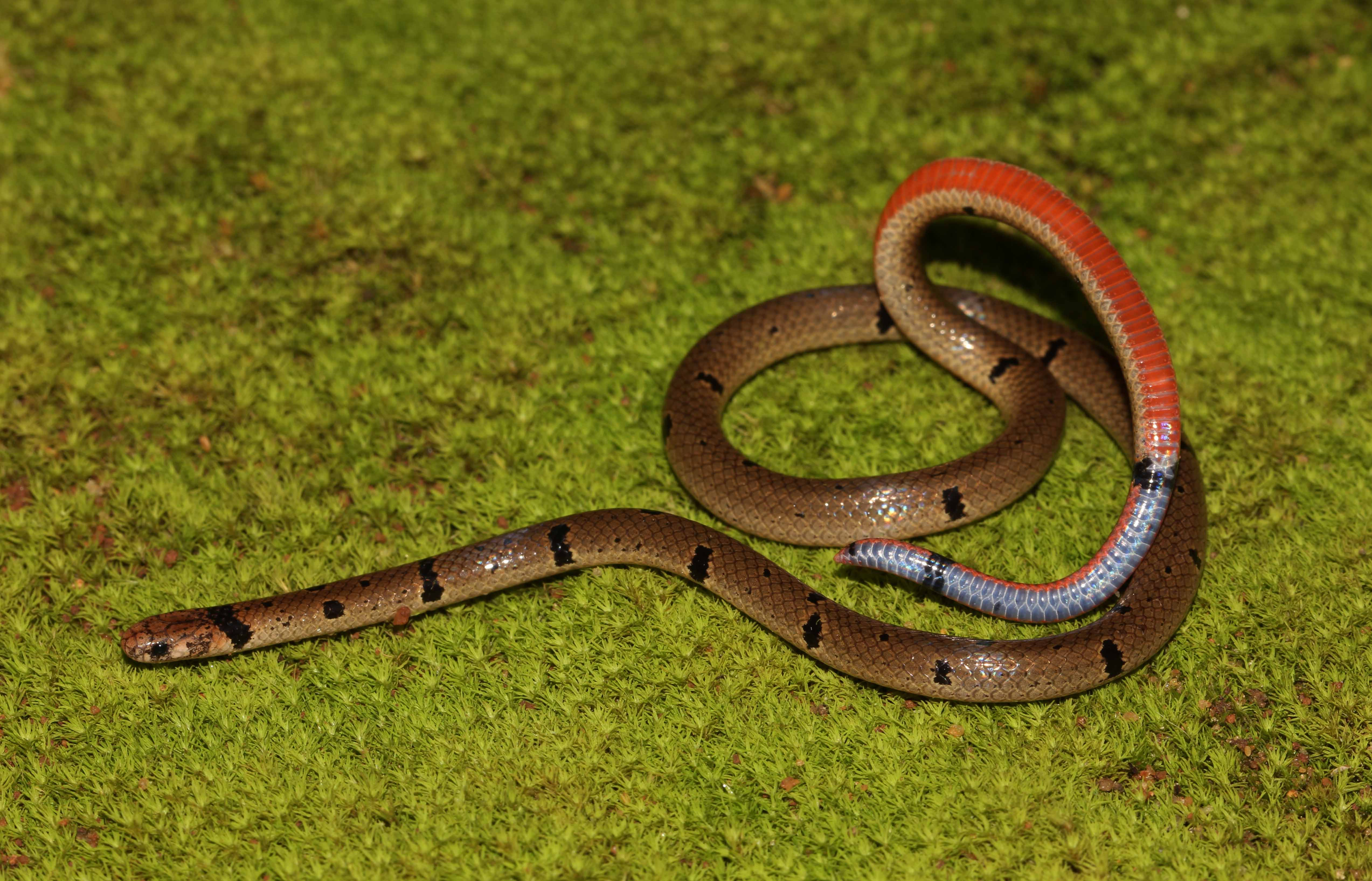

Conservation status
- Endangered (IUCN 3.1)

Scientific classification
- Kingdom: Animalia
- Phylum: Chordata
- Class: Reptilia
- Order: Squamata
- Suborder: Serpentes
- Family: Elapidae
- Genus: Calliophis
- Species: C. haematoetron

Binomial name
- Calliophis haematoetron Smith, Manamendra-Arachchi & Somaweera, 2008

Synonyms
- Calliophis haematoetron Smith, Manamendra-Arachchi & Somaweera, 2008; Calliophis melanurus Taylor, 1950; Calliophis melanurus sinhaleyus — Deraniyagala, 1951; Calliophis melanurus sinhaleyus — Das & De Silva, 2005

= Calliophis haematoetron =

Species of snake

Calliophis haematoetron, commonly known as the blood-bellied coralsnake or blood-bellied coral snake, is a species of venomous elapid snake endemic to Sri Lanka.

== Geographic range ==
It is found in central lowlands of Sri Lanka. It is known from Wasgamuwa and Rattota.

== Description ==
Calliophis haematoetron measure 15–41 cm (5.9–16.1 in) in total length. Frontal shorter or sub-equal to inter-parietal suture. First sub-labial does not contact second pair of chin-shields. Head relatively unpigmented. No light spots postero-lateral to parietals. Dorsum banded. Venter is bright red and red pigment lateral to blue under-tail colour.

Snake is known to produce 3 eggs at a time.
