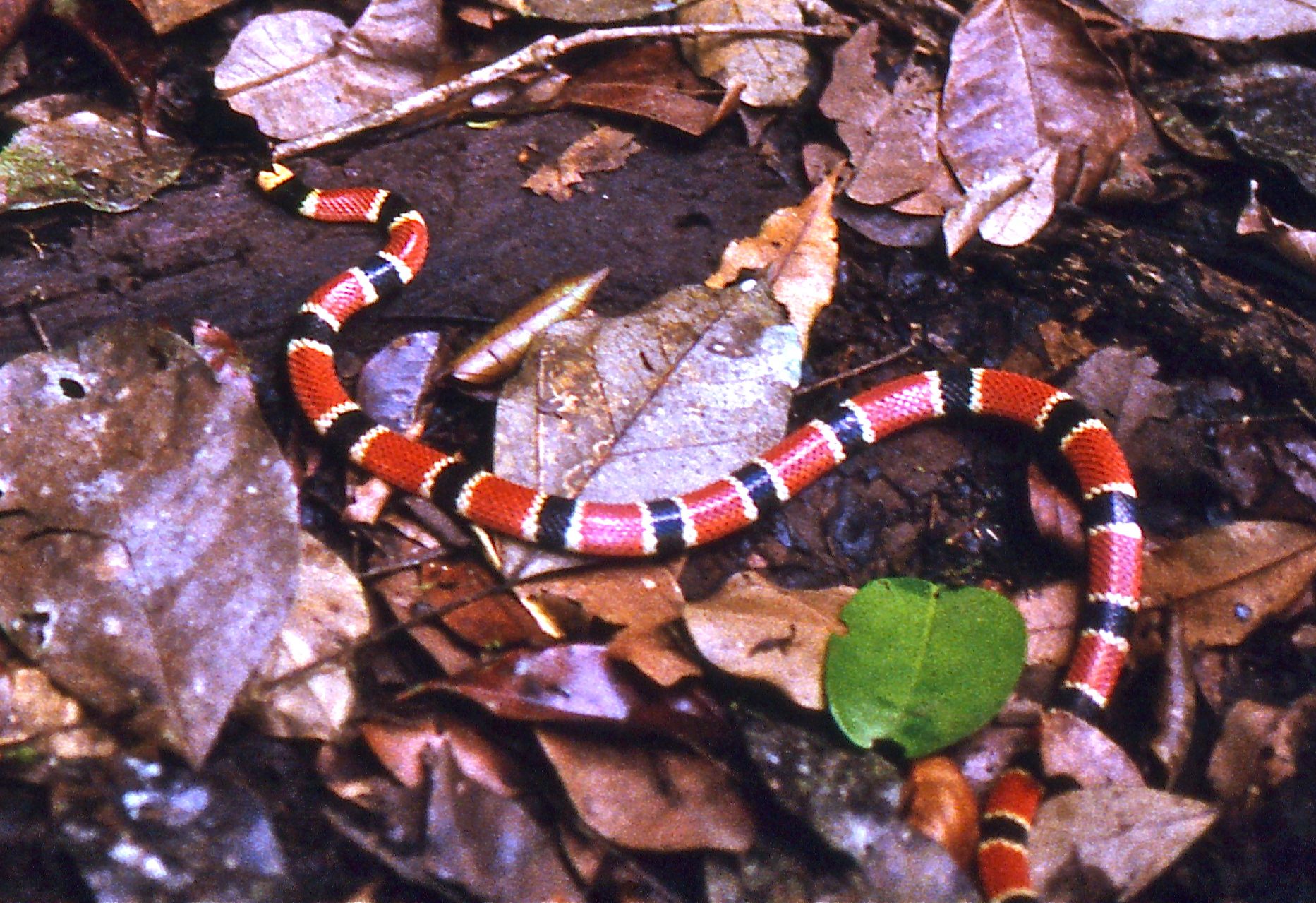

Conservation status
- Least Concern (IUCN 3.1)

Scientific classification
- Kingdom: Animalia
- Phylum: Chordata
- Class: Reptilia
- Order: Squamata
- Suborder: Serpentes
- Family: Elapidae
- Genus: Micrurus
- Species: M. alleni

Binomial name
- Micrurus alleni Schmidt, 1936
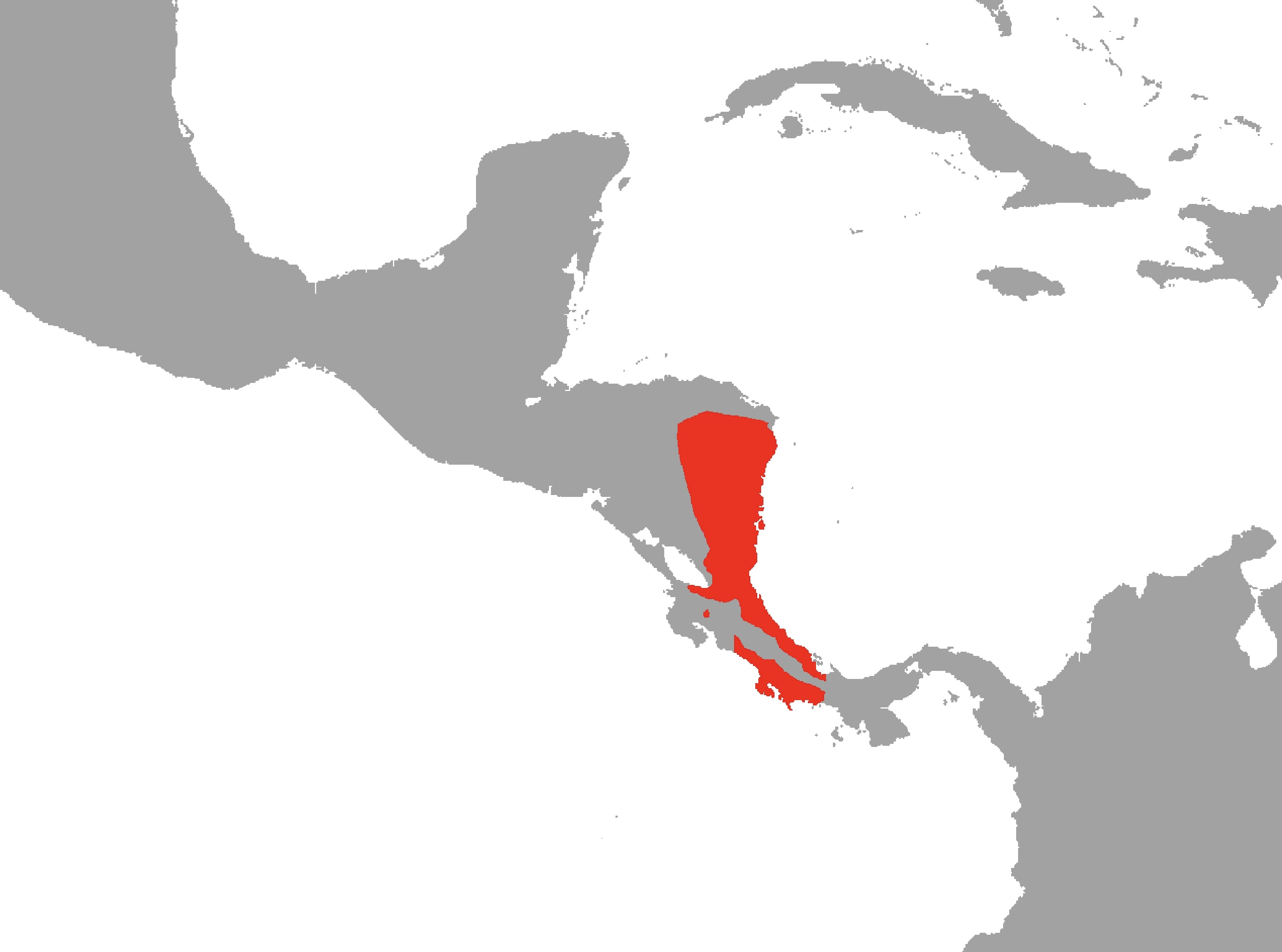

Synonyms
- Micrurus nigrocinctus alleni Schmidt, 1936; Micrurus nigrocinctus yatesi Dunn, 1942; Micrurus yatesi Dunn, 1942; Micrurus alleni yatesi Dunn, 1942; Micrurus alleni richardi Taylor, 1951

= Micrurus alleni =

Species of snake

Micrurus alleni, also known commonly as Allen's coral snake, the arrow-headed coral snake, and coral cabeza flecha in local Spanish, is a species of venomous snake in the family Elapidae. The species is native to Central America.

== Etymology ==
The specific name, alleni, is in honor of American herpetologist Morrow J. Allen who collected the holotype.

== Geographic distribution ==
Micrurus alleni is found in Costa Rica, Honduras, Nicaragua, and Panama.

== Habitat ==
The preferred natural habitat of Micrurus alleni is forest, at elevations from sea level to 1,620 m (5,310 ft).

== Diet ==
Micrurus alleni preys on the marbled swamp eel (Synbranchus marmoratus), caecilians, lizards, and snakes.

== Reproduction ==
Micrurus alleni is oviparous.

== Venom ==
Micrurus alleni possesses a powerful venom. When "milked" in a laboratory, the average venom yield was only 3 mg (dry weight). However, the estimated lethal dose for an adult human is only 3–5 mg.
