= Micrurus limbatus =

Conservation status
- Least Concern (IUCN 3.1)

Scientific classification
- Kingdom: Animalia
- Phylum: Chordata
- Class: Reptilia
- Order: Squamata
- Suborder: Serpentes
- Family: Elapidae
- Genus: Micrurus
- Species: M. limbatus

Binomial name
- Micrurus limbatus Fraser, 1964
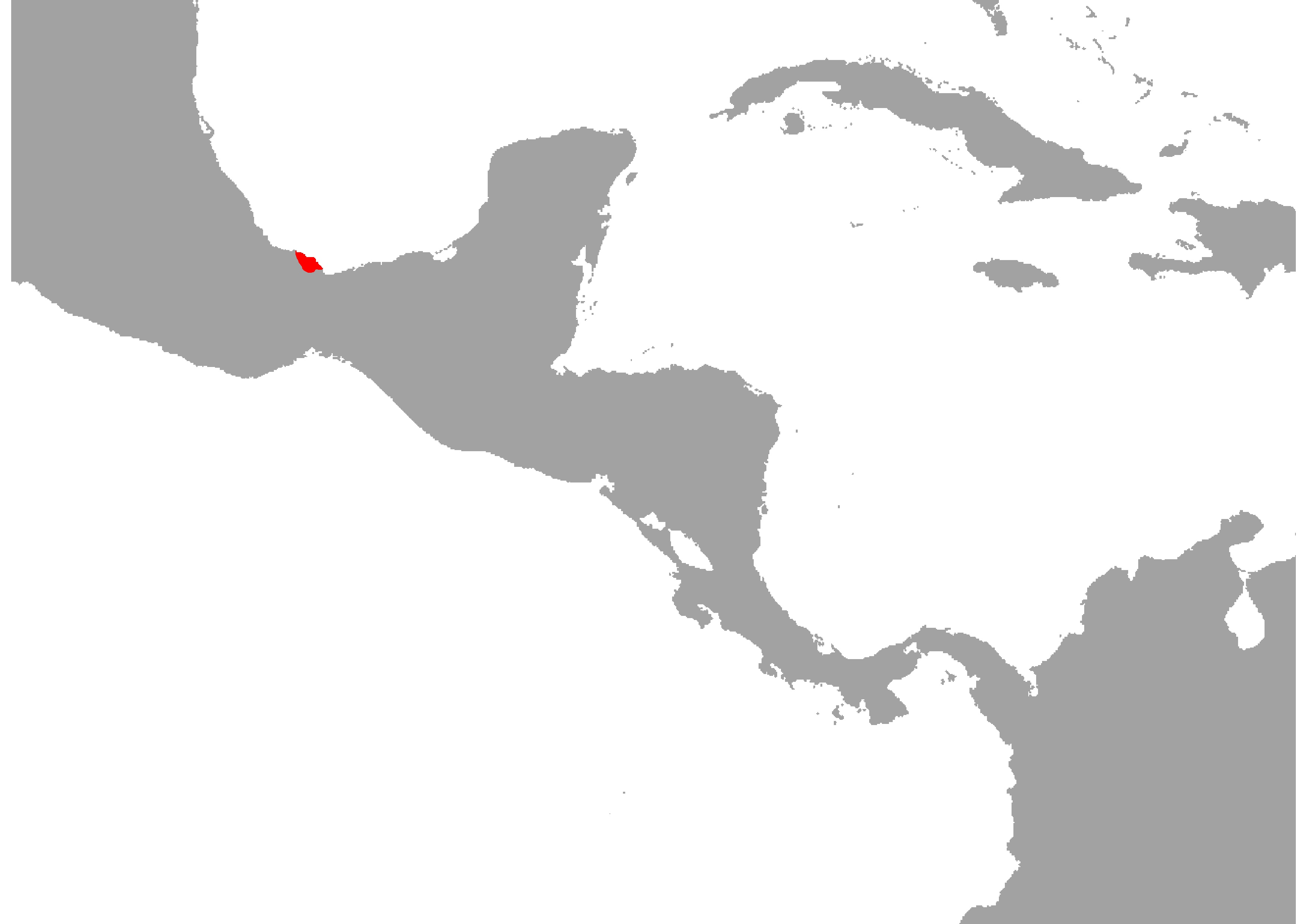

Species of snake

Micrurus limbatus, also known commonly as the Tuxtlan coral snake and el coralillo de Tuxtla in Mexican Spanish, is a species of venomous snake in the family Elapidae. The species is endemic to Mexico. There are two recognized subspecies.

== Description ==
Micrurus limbatus is a small species of coral snake. Adults usually have a total length (tail included) of 40–55 cm (16–22 in). The maximum recorded total length is 58.5 cm (23 in).

Unlike most species of the genus Micrurus, M. limbatus is bicolored. Its color pattern consists of alternating red and black rings. There are no yellow or white rings present. In the subspecies M. l. spilosomus, the black rings are reduced to black dorsal spots, which are oval or round.

== Geographic distribution ==
Micrurus limbatus is found in eastern Mexico, in the Mexican state of Veracruz.

== Habitat ==
The preferred natural habitat of Micrurus limbatus is forest, at elevations of 160–1,050 m (520–3,440 ft), but it has also been found in disturbed and artificial habitats such as agricultural areas.

== Behavior ==
Micrurus limbatus is terrestrial.

== Reproduction ==
Micrurus limbatus is oviparous.

== Subspecies ==
Two subspecies of Micrurus limbatus are recognized as being valid, including the nominotypical subspecies.

- Micrurus limbatus limbatus Fraser, 1964
- Micrurus limbatus spilosomus Pérez-Higareda & H.M. Smith, 1990
