= Micrurus camilae =

Conservation status
- Data Deficient (IUCN 3.1)

Scientific classification
- Kingdom: Animalia
- Phylum: Chordata
- Class: Reptilia
- Order: Squamata
- Suborder: Serpentes
- Family: Elapidae
- Genus: Micrurus
- Species: M. camilae

Binomial name
- Micrurus camilae Renjifo & Lundberg, 2003
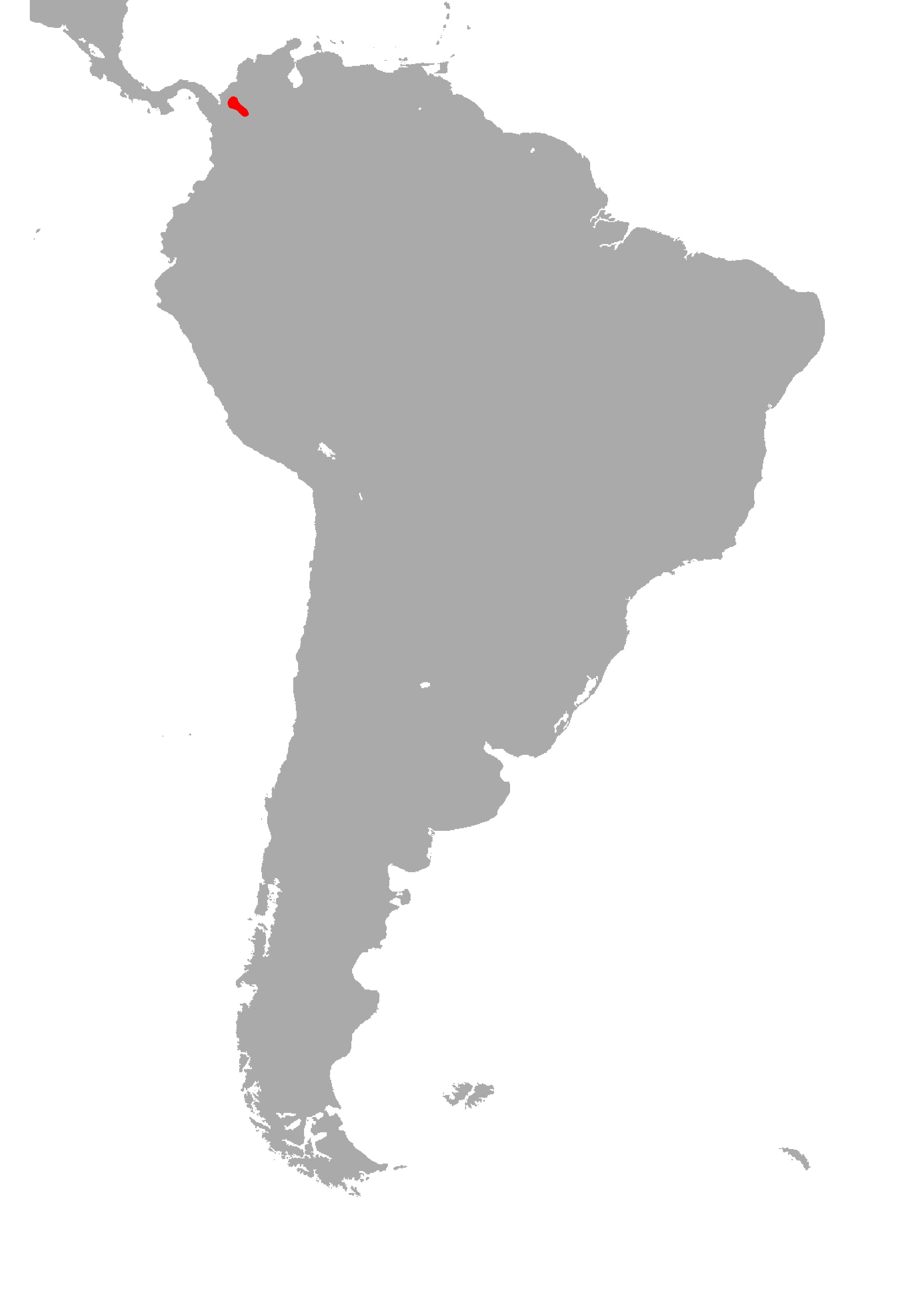

Species of snake

Micrurus camilae otherwise known as Camila's Coralsnake is a species of coral snake in the family Elapidae. The species is endemic to Colombia. Not much is known about this species, all data originates from 5 collected specimens and several observations.

== Etymology ==
The specific name, camilae, is in honor of María Camila Renjifo, a doctor with a Ph.D in Tropical Medicines from Colombia

== Description ==
The color pattern of Micrurus camilae is unique for its genus. For the full length of the body, it consists of bicolor markings alternating with rings which are yellow ventrally and laterally, but red dorsally, giving the impression of a broad red vertebral stripe, interrupted by the black rings. This characteristic distinguishes it from all other snakes in the genus Mircurus However, on the tail, the colored rings are completely red.

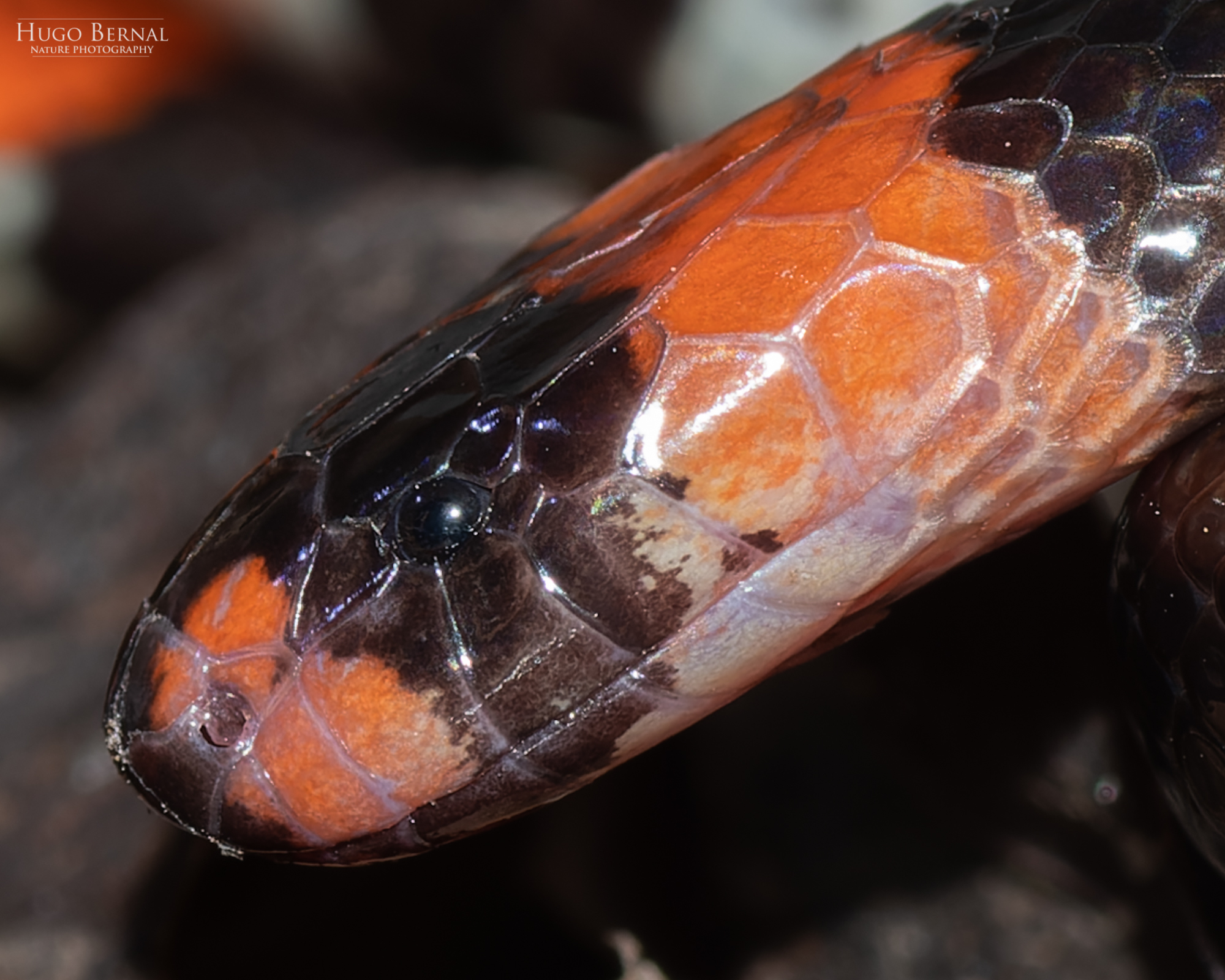
Close-up of Micrurus camilae

== Geographic distribution ==
Micrurus camilae is endemic to the lowland inter-Andean regions of northern Colombia, in the departments of Antioquia, Córdoba, Santander, and Sucre.

== Habitat ==
The preferred natural habitat of Micrurus camilae is low land forest, at elevations around 900 m (3,000 ft). The natural habitat of M. camilae overlaps with human villages making the risk of snake bites a problem because the snake is venomous.

== Behavior ==
Micrurus camilae is terrestrial.

== Reproduction ==
Micrurus camilae is oviparous.
