= Micrurus steindachneri =

Conservation status
- Least Concern (IUCN 3.1)

Scientific classification
- Kingdom: Animalia
- Phylum: Chordata
- Class: Reptilia
- Order: Squamata
- Suborder: Serpentes
- Family: Elapidae
- Genus: Micrurus
- Species: M. steindachneri

Binomial name
- Micrurus steindachneri (F. Werner, 1901)
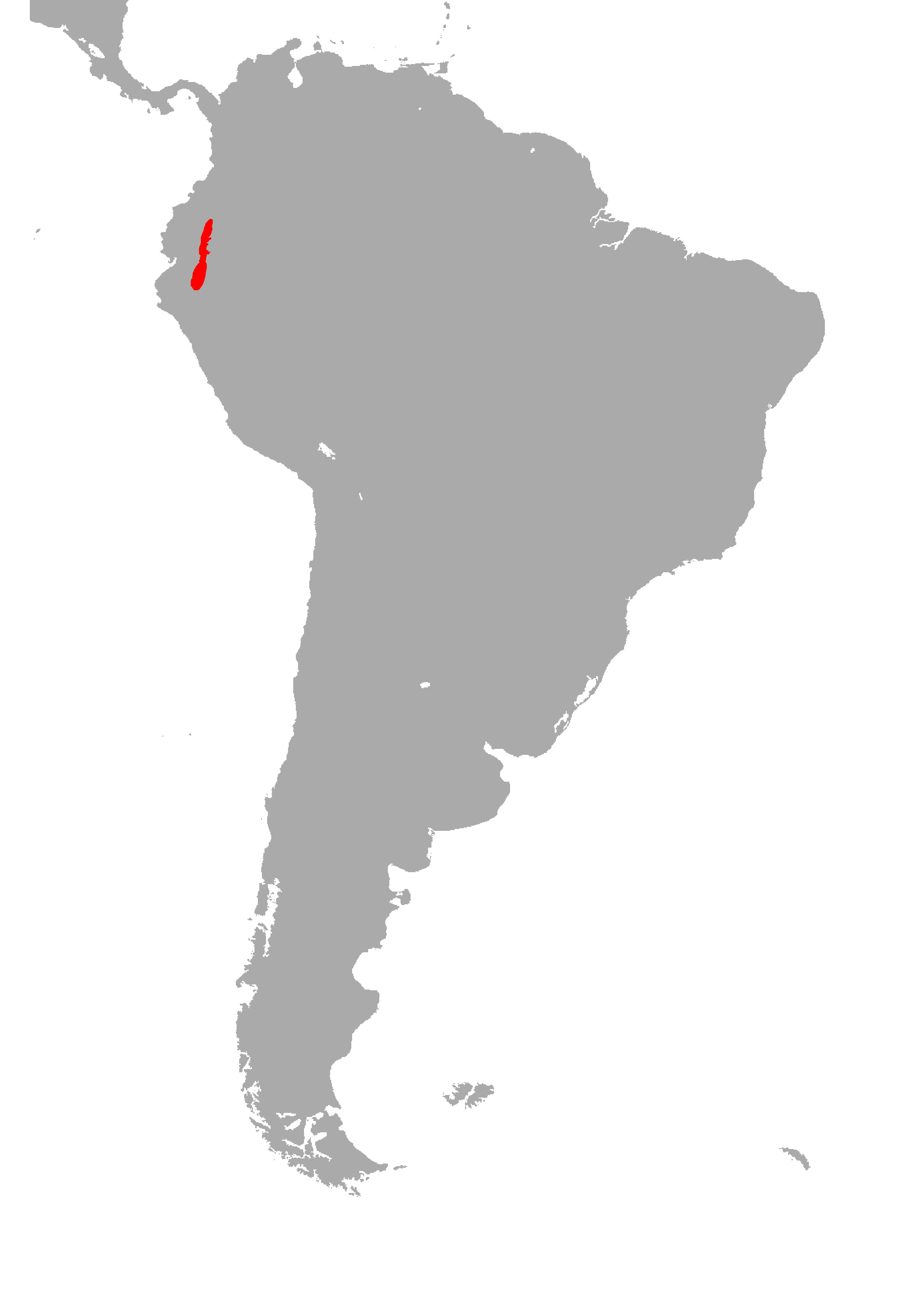

Synonyms
- Elaps steindachneri F. Werner, 1901; Elaps fasslii F. Werner, 1927

Species of snake

Micrurus steindachneri, also known commonly as the piedmont coral snake, Steindachner's coral snake, and coral de laderas in South American Spanish, is a species of venomous snake in the family Elapidae. The species is native to northwestern South America. There are two recognized subspecies.

== Description ==
Micrurus steindachneri is medium-sized for its genus. Adults usually have a total length (tail included) of 55–70 cm (22–28 in). The maximum recorded total length is 88 cm (35 in).

Like many other species of New World coral snakes the color pattern of M. steindachneri consists of red, white, and black rings. The black rings are not arranged in triads, but rather are single. The red rings are 3–4 dorsals and 3–4 ventrals wide, the white rings are one dorsal and one ventral wide, and the black rings are 3–7 dorsals and 2–4 ventrals wide. Males have 28–34 black rings on the body, and females have 30–42 black rings on the body.

Males have 200–216 ventrals and 42–49 subcaudals, and lack supraanal tubercles. Females have 224–231 ventrals and 29–38 subcaudals.

== Geographic distribution ==
Micrurus steindachneri is found on the eastern slopes of the Andes in Ecuador and extreme northern Peru.

== Habitat ==
The preferred natural habitat of Micrurus steindachneri is forest, at elevations of 500–2,000 m (1,600–6,600 ft).

== Behavior ==
Micrurus steindachneri is terrestrial, fossorial, and diurnal.

== Reproduction ==
Micrurus steindachneri is oviparous.

== Subspecies ==
Two subspecies are recognized as being valid, including the nominotypical subspecies.

- Micrurus steindachneri orcesi Roze, 1967 – Río Pastaza watershed in Ecuador
- Micrurus steindachneri steindachneri (F. Werner, 1901) – Río Santiago watershed in Ecuador and Peru

== Etymology ==
The specific name, steindachneri, is in honor of Viennese herpetologist Franz Steindachner.

The subspecific name, orcesi, is in honor of Ecuadorian herpetologist Gustavo Orcés.
