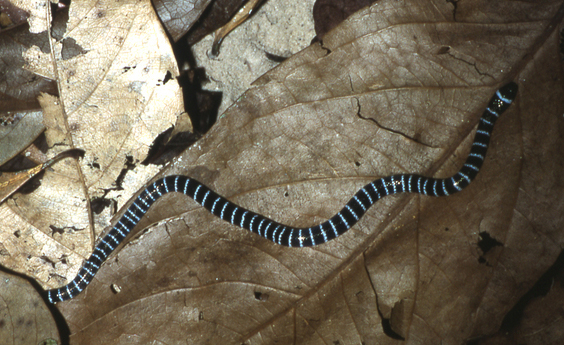
- Micrurus annellatus annellatus in Peru

Conservation status
- Least Concern (IUCN 3.1)

Scientific classification
- Kingdom: Animalia
- Phylum: Chordata
- Class: Reptilia
- Order: Squamata
- Suborder: Serpentes
- Family: Elapidae
- Genus: Micrurus
- Species: M. annellatus

Binomial name
- Micrurus annellatus (W. Peters, 1871)
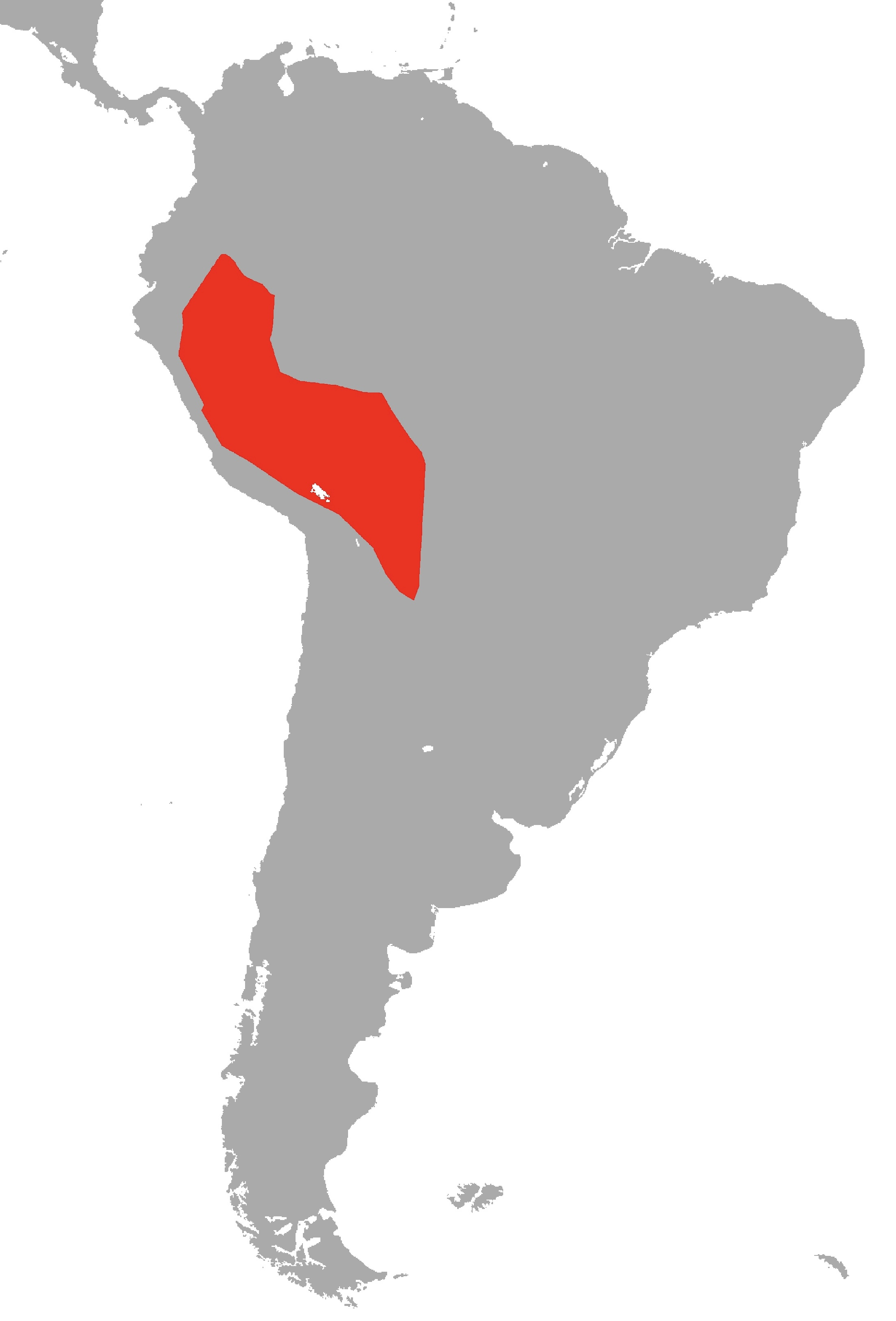

Synonyms
- Elaps annellatus W. Peters, 1871; Elaps regularis Boulenger, 1902; Micrurus annellatus montanus Schmidt, 1954

= Micrurus annellatus =

Species of snake

Micrurus annellatus, commonly known as the annellated coral snake, is a species of venomous snake in the family Elapidae. The species is native to northwestern South America. There are three recognized subspecies, including the nominate subspecies.

== Geographic distribution ==
Micrurus annellatus is found in Bolivia, western Brazil, southeastern Ecuador, and eastern Peru.

== Subspecies ==
The following three subspecies of Micrurus annellatus are recognized as being valid.

- Micrurus annellatus annellatus (W. Peters, 1871) – common annellated coral snake
- Micrurus annellatus balzanii (Boulenger, 1898) – Yungas coral snake
- Micrurus annellatus bolivianus (Roze, 1967) – Bolivian coral snake

== Local common names ==
The annellated coral snake is commonly called coral anilada and naca-naca in South American Spanish, and cobra-coral anelada in Brazilian Portuguese.

== Description ==
The annellated coral snake can grow to a total length (tail included) of 70 cm (28 in), but most are closer to 20–30 cm (7.9–11.8 in). Its color pattern may vary among subspecies: overall dark blue to black, with narrow rings of white, yellow, or pale blue (M. a. annellatus); or narrow rings of dull red (M. a. balzani). Tricolored specimens are black, red, and yellow, with color pattern not occurring in "triads".

== Habitat ==
Micrurus annellatus is mainly found in montane wet forest and cloud forest, at elevations of 300–2,000 m (980–6,560 ft).

== Reproduction ==
Micrurus annellatus is oviparous. Clutch size is fewer than 15 eggs.
