= Micrurus albicinctus =

Conservation status
- Least Concern (IUCN 3.1)

Scientific classification
- Kingdom: Animalia
- Phylum: Chordata
- Class: Reptilia
- Order: Squamata
- Suborder: Serpentes
- Family: Elapidae
- Genus: Micrurus
- Species: M. albicinctus

Binomial name
- Micrurus albicinctus Amaral, 1925
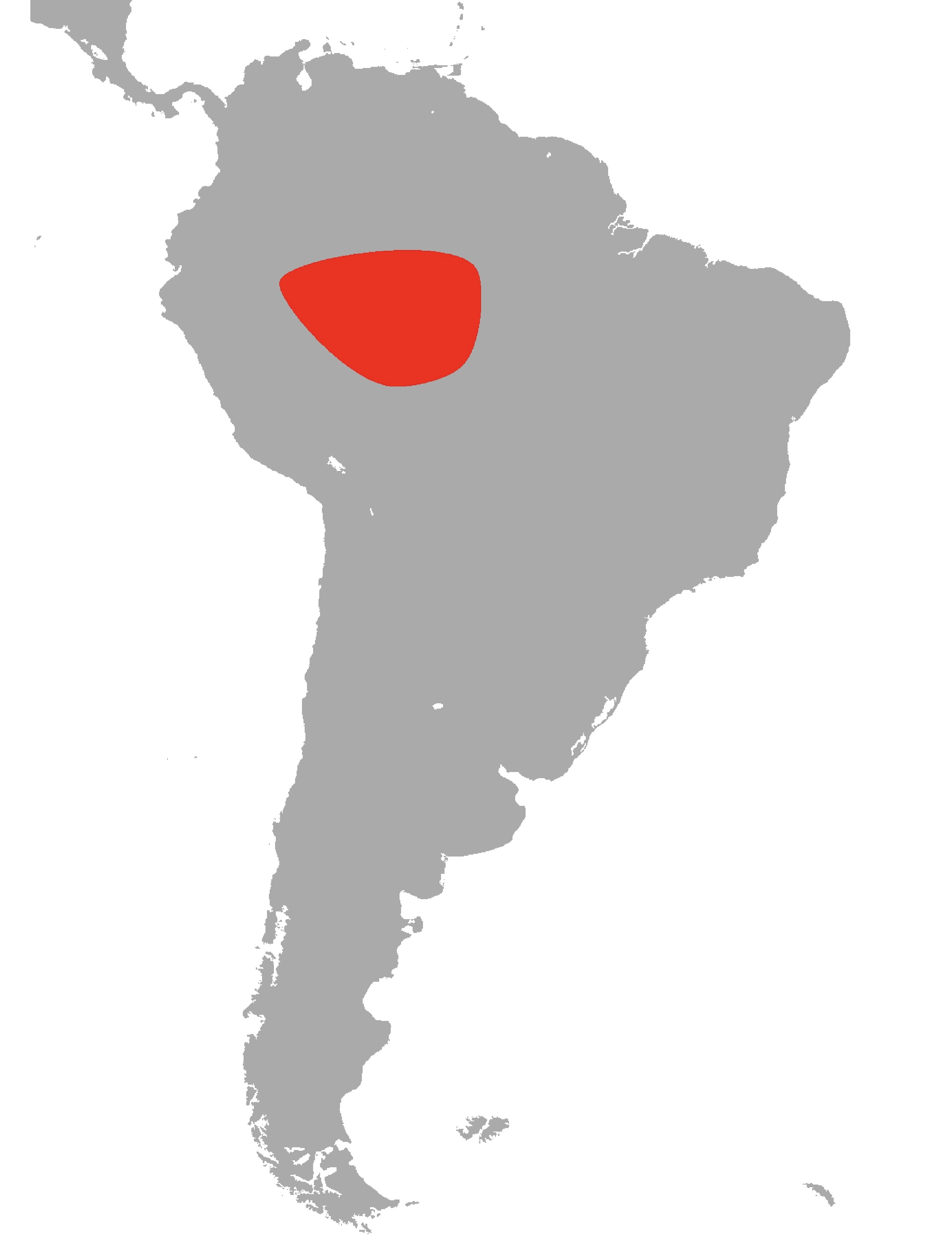

Synonyms
- Micrurus waehnerorum Meise, 1938

Species of snake

Micrurus albicinctus, also known commonly as the white-banded coral snake, is a species of venomous snake in the family Elapidae. The species is native to northwestern South America.

== Description ==
Unlike most species in its genus, Micrurus albicintus has no red in its color pattern. It is black, with narrow white rings. Dorsally, each white ring appears as a series of spots, but ventrally the rings are uninterrupted.

== Geographic distribution ==
Micrurus albicinctus is found in northwestern Brazil, southeastern Colombia, and northeastern Peru.

== Habitat ==
The preferred natural habitat of Micrurus albicinctus is forest.

== Diet ==
Micrurus albicinctus is ophiophagous, preying exclusively on snakes.

== Reproduction ==
Micrurus albicinctus is oviparous.
