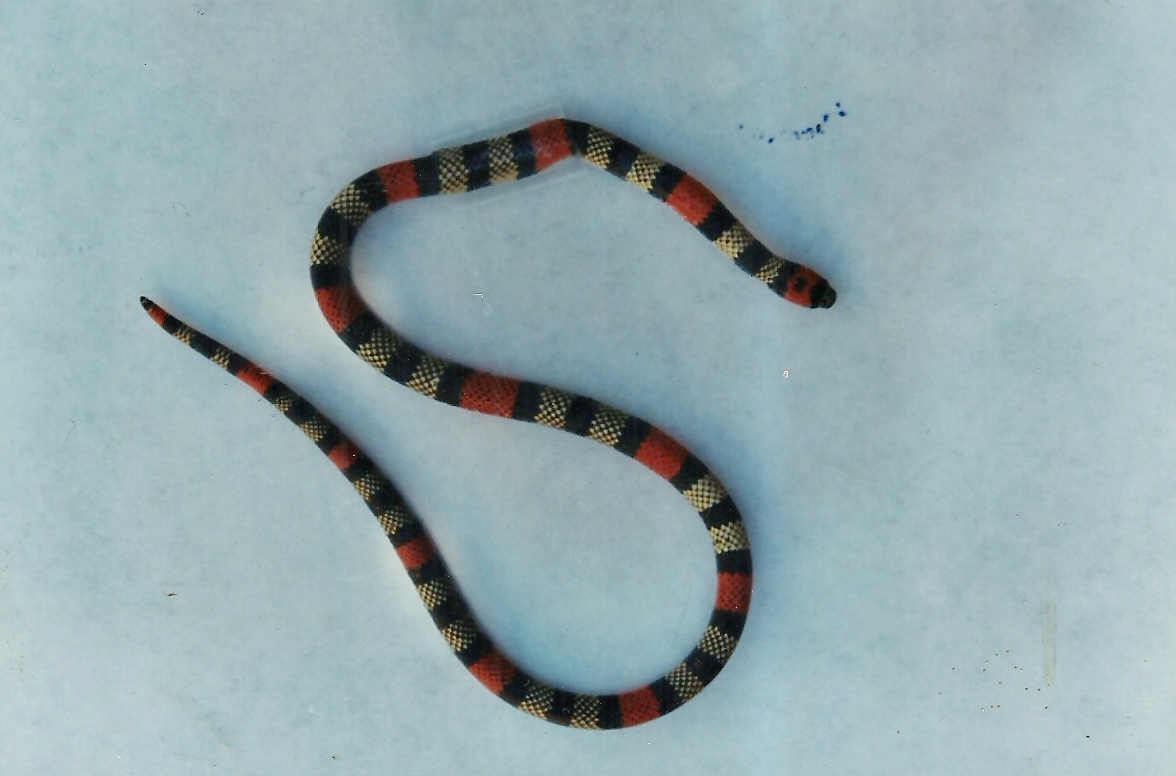
- Paratype of Micrurus isozonus sandneri

Conservation status
- Least Concern (IUCN 3.1)

Scientific classification
- Kingdom: Animalia
- Phylum: Chordata
- Class: Reptilia
- Order: Squamata
- Suborder: Serpentes
- Family: Elapidae
- Genus: Micrurus
- Species: M. isozonus

Binomial name
- Micrurus isozonus (Cope, 1860)
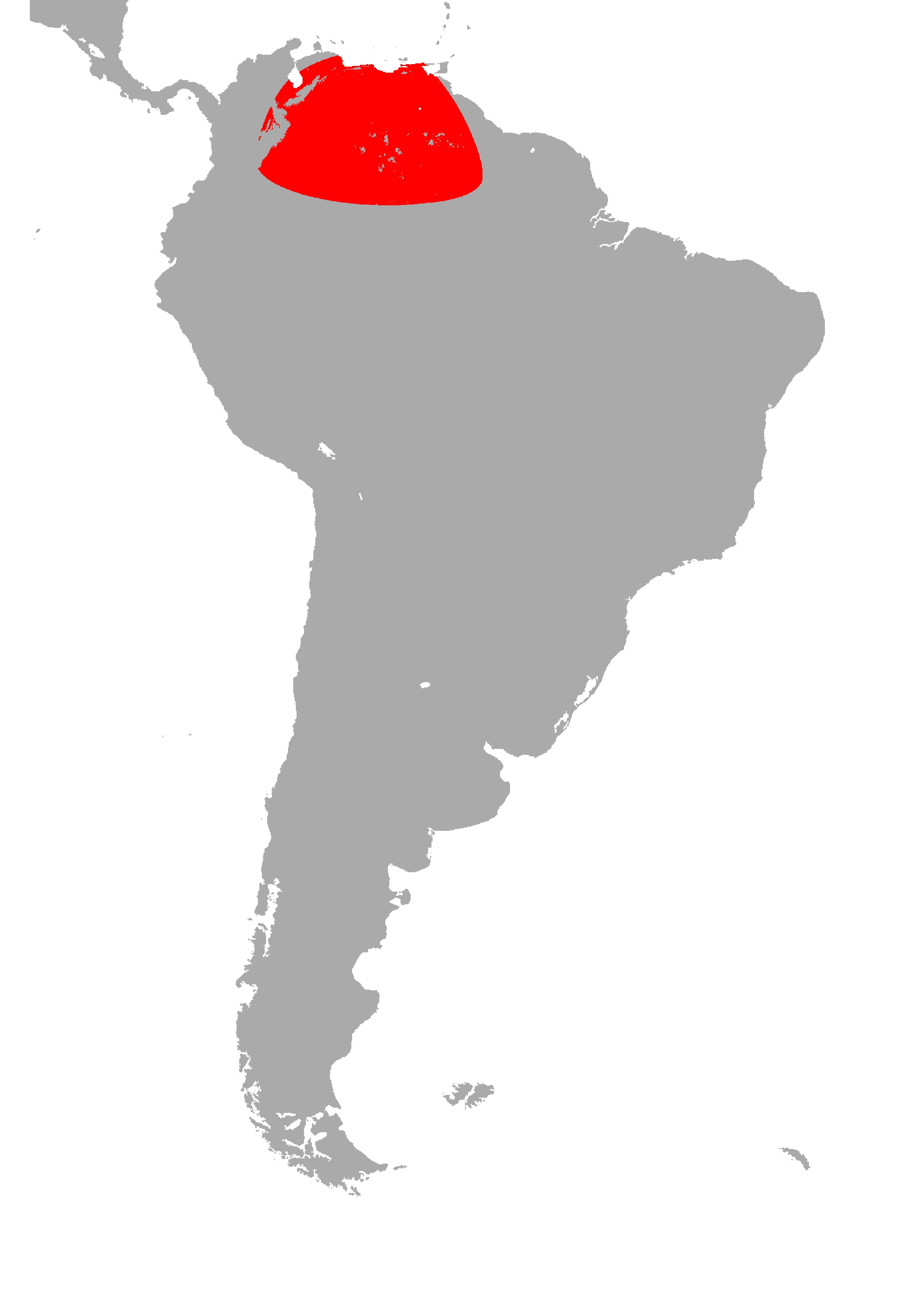

Synonyms
- Elaps isozonus Cope, 1860; Elaps omissus Boulenger, 1920

= Micrurus isozonus =

Species of snake

Micrurus isozonus, also known commonly as the equal-banded coral snake and the Venezuela coral snake, is a species of venomous snake in the family Elapidae. The species is native to northern South America. There are two recognized subspecies.

== Local common names ==
Local common names for Micrurus isozonus include cobra coral da Venezuela and cobra coral de faixas iguais in Brazilian Portuguese, and coral de franjas iguales in South American Spanish.

== Description ==
The color pattern of Micrurus isozonus, like most coral snakes, consists of black, red, and white (or yellow) rings. The black rings are arranged in triads. The first triad is complete, unlike in several other coral snakes. The white rings are usually slightly wider than the black rings. The dorsal scales of the red and white rings are conspicuously black-tipped.

Medium-sized for the genus Micrurus, adults of M. isozonus usually have a total length (tail included) of 48–70 cm (19–28 in). The maximum recorded total length is 88.5 cm (34.8 in).

== Geographic distribution ==
Micrurus isozonus is found in Brazil, Colombia, Guyana, and Venezuela.

== Habitat ==
The preferred natural habitats of Micrurus isozonus are forest, savanna, and shrubland, usually near water, at elevations from near sea level to 1,400 m (4,600 ft), and it has also been found in disturbed habitats such as pasture.

== Behavior ==
Micrurus isozonus is terrestrial.

== Diet ==
Micrurus isozonus preys upon terrestrial lizards, such as species of the genus Bachia, and snakes of the family Colubridae.

== Reproduction ==
Micrurus isozonus is oviparous.

== Venom ==
Micrurus isozonus possesses a potent venom which it uses to kill its prey. When "milked" in a laboratory, the average venom yield is 9 mg (dry weight), which is more than the estimated lethal dose for an adult human of 5–7 mg.

== Subspecies ==
Two subspecies are recognized as being valid, including the nominotypical subspecies.

- Micrurus isozonus isozonus (Cope, 1860)
- Micrurus isozonus sandneri Arenas-Vargas, 2015 – Sandner's coral snake

Nota bene: A trinomial authority in parentheses indicates that the subspecies was originally described in a genus other than Micrurus.

== Etymology ==
The specific name, isozonus, is Latin for "equal areas", referring to the approximately equal width of the black and white rings.

The subspecific name, sandneri, is in honor of German-born Venezuelan herpetologist Fernando Sandner Montilla.
