= Micrurus proximans =

Conservation status
- Least Concern (IUCN 3.1)

Scientific classification
- Kingdom: Animalia
- Phylum: Chordata
- Class: Reptilia
- Order: Squamata
- Suborder: Serpentes
- Family: Elapidae
- Genus: Micrurus
- Species: M. proximans

Binomial name
- Micrurus proximans H.M. Smith & Chrapliwy, 1958
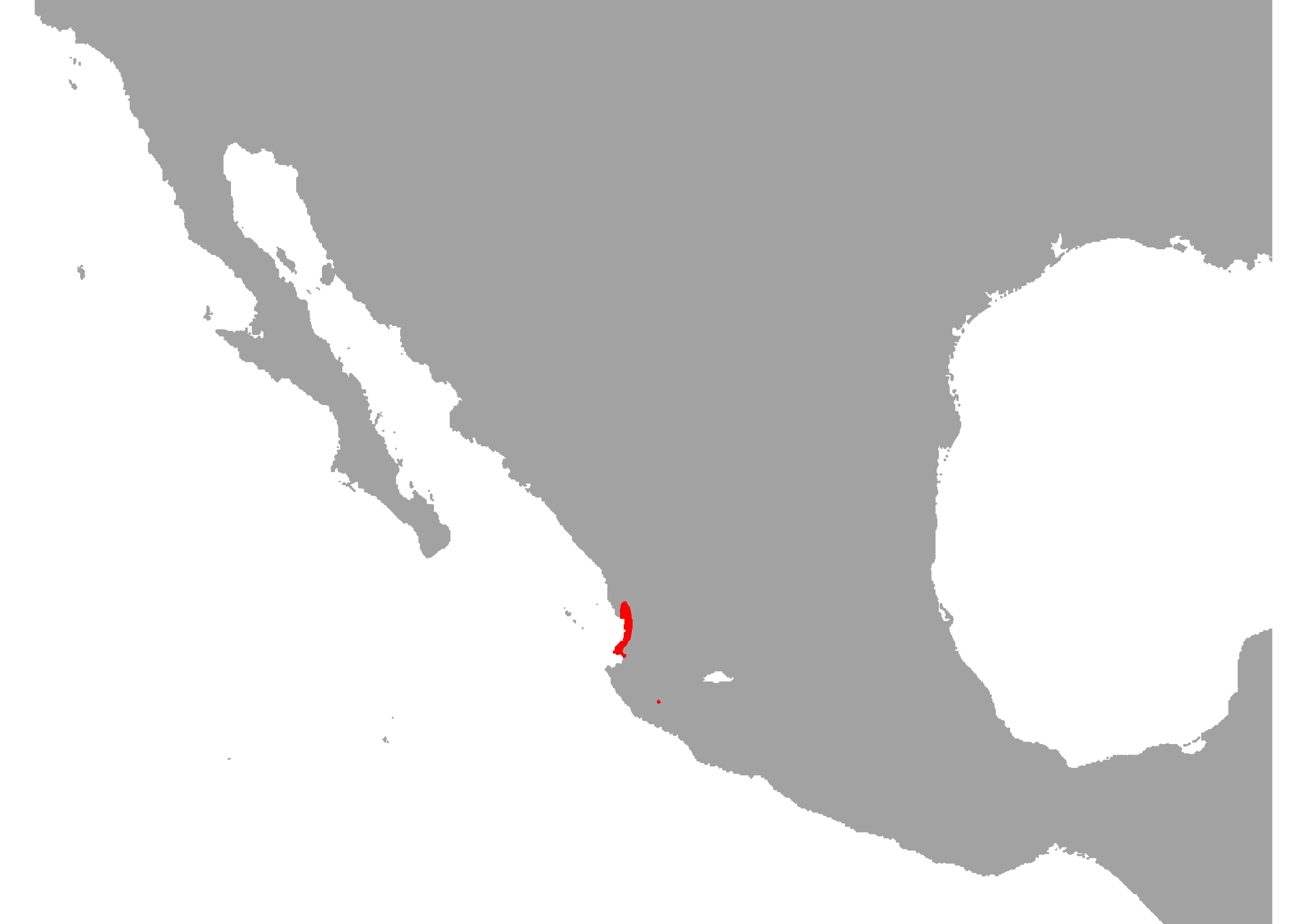

Synonyms
- Micrurus diastema proximans H.M. Smith & Chrapliwy, 1958

Species of snake

Micrurus proximans, also known commonly as the Nayarit coral snake and el coralillo de Nayarit in Mexican Spanish, is a species of venomous snake in the family Elapidae. The species is endemic to Mexico.

== Description ==
Micrurus proximans is small for its genus. Adults usually have a total length (tail included) of 40–50 cm (16–20 in). The maximum recorded total length is 56.5 cm (22.2 in).

Like many other species of New World coral snakes, the color pattern consist of red, black, and white (or yellow) rings, with the black rings not arranged in triads. Unlike other species, the females of M. proximans have several black rings interrupted ventrally. The white (or yellow) rings are narrowest (1 dorsal and 1 ventral wide). The black rings are wider (2–3 dorsal and 2–3 ventrals wide). The red rings are widest, two times or more wider than the black rings, depending on the number of black rings present. Males have 21–24 black rings on the body. Females have 17–22 black rings on the body, 3–10 of which are complete.

Males have supraanal tubercles, and have 202–207 ventrals and 47–53 subcaudals. Females have 210–218 ventrals and 36–42 subcaudals.

== Geographic distribution ==
Micrurus proximans is found in western Mexico, in the Mexican states of Colima, Jalisco, and Nayarit.

== Habitat ==
The preferred natural habitat of Micrurus proximans is forest, at elevations from near sea level to 500 m (1,600 ft).

== Behavior ==
Micrurus proximans is terrestrial.

== Diet ==
Micrurus proximans is known to prey upon Rena dugesii, and probably upon other small snakes.

== Reproduction ==
Micrurus proximans is oviparous.
