= Calliophis melanurus =

Conservation status
- Least Concern (IUCN 3.1)

Scientific classification
- Kingdom: Animalia
- Phylum: Chordata
- Class: Reptilia
- Order: Squamata
- Suborder: Serpentes
- Family: Elapidae
- Genus: Calliophis
- Species: C. melanurus

Binomial name
- Calliophis melanurus (Shaw, 1802)

Synonyms
- Coluber melanurus Shaw, 1802; Vipera trimaculata Daudin, 1803; Elaps trimaculatus — Merrem, 1820; Elaps melanurus — Jerdon, 1856; Callophis [sic] trimaculatus — Günther, 1859; Callophis [sic] melanurus — M.A. Smith, 1943; Calliophis melanurus — Slowinski, Boundy & Lawson, 2001

Species of reptile

Calliophis melanurus, commonly known as the slender coral snake, is a species of elapid snake endemic to the Indian subcontinent. Two subspecies are recognized, including the nominotypical subspecies.

== Geographic range ==
It is found in India, Bangladesh, and Sri Lanka.

The subspecies Calliophis melanurus sinhaleyus is found in Sri Lanka.
