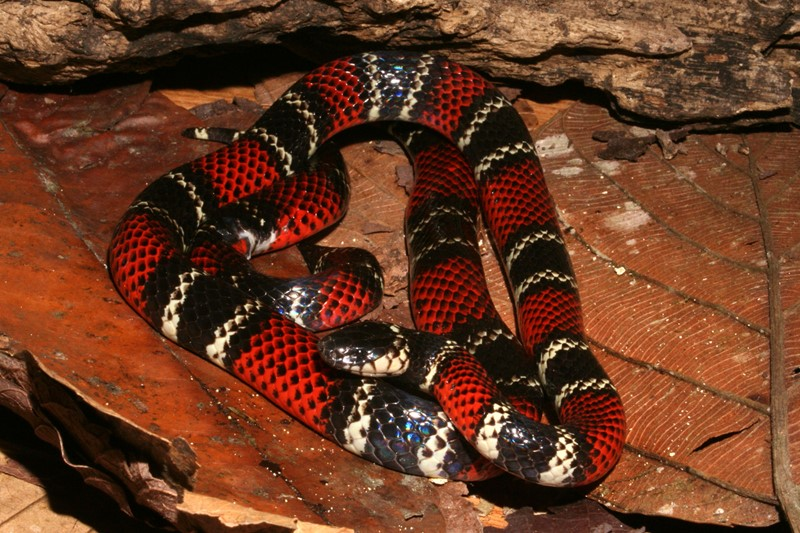

Conservation status
- Least Concern (IUCN 3.1)

Scientific classification
- Kingdom: Animalia
- Phylum: Chordata
- Class: Reptilia
- Order: Squamata
- Suborder: Serpentes
- Family: Elapidae
- Genus: Micrurus
- Species: M. bocourti

Binomial name
- Micrurus bocourti (Jan, 1872)
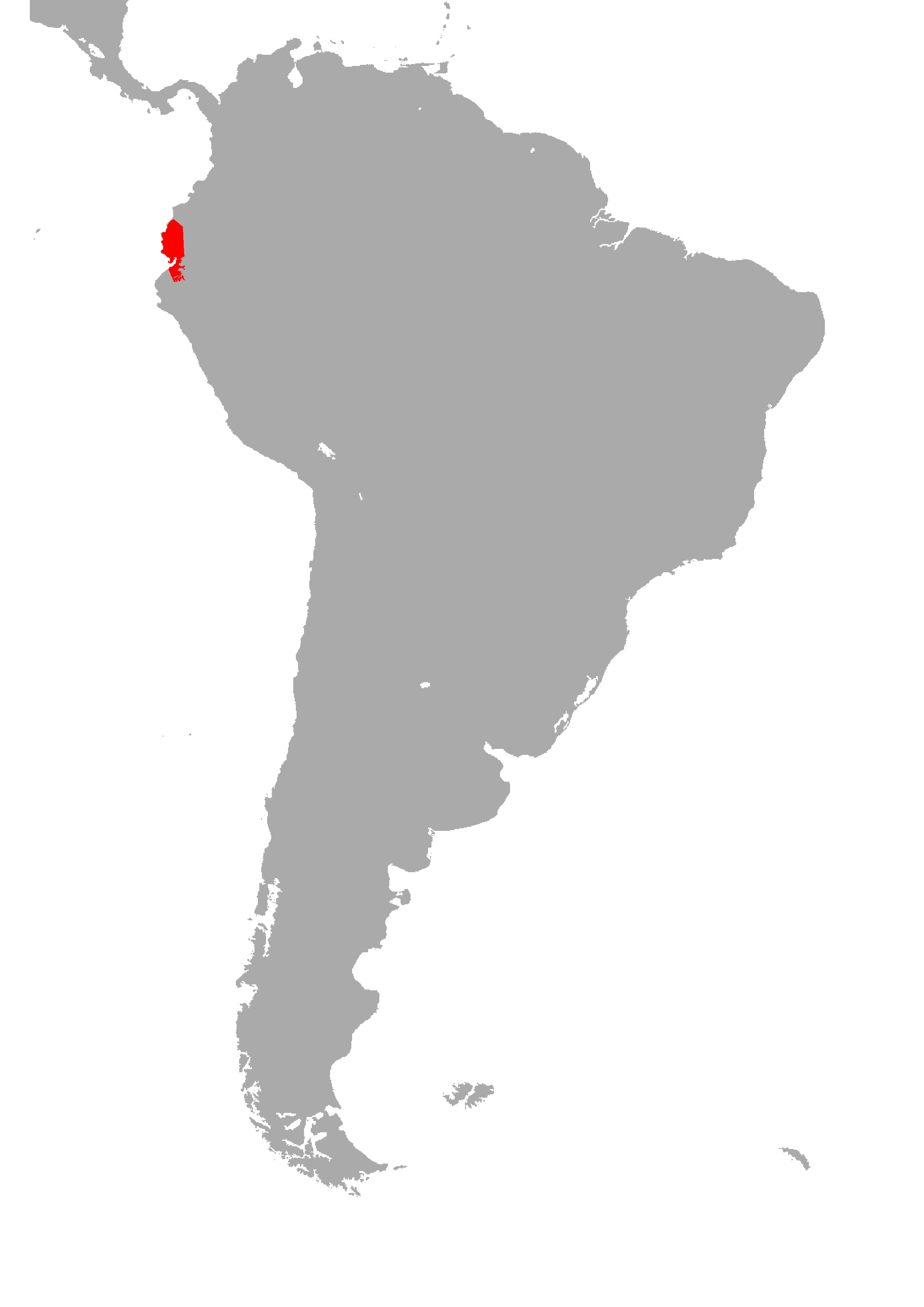

Synonyms
- Elaps bocourti Jan, 1872; Micrurus ecuadorianus Schmidt, 1936; Micrurus catamayensis Roze, 1989

= Micrurus bocourti =

Species of snake

Micrurus bocourti, also known commonly as the Ecuador coral snake, the Ecuadorian coral snake, the false triad coral snake, and coral de tríadas falsas in South American Spanish, is a species of venomous snake in the family Elapidae. The species is native to northwestern South America.

== Etymology ==
The specific name, bocourti, is in honor of French zoologist Marie Firmin Bocourt.

== Geographic distribution ==
Micrurus bocourti is found in Ecuador and Peru.

== Habitat ==
The preferred natural habitat of Micrurus bocourti is forest, at elevations from sea level to 1,456 m (4,777 ft).

== Behavior ==
Micrurus bocourti is terrestrial.

== Reproduction ==
Micrurus bocourti is oviparous.
