= Speckled coral snake =

There are two species of snake named speckled coral snake:

- Calliophis maculiceps
- Micrurus margaritiferus
