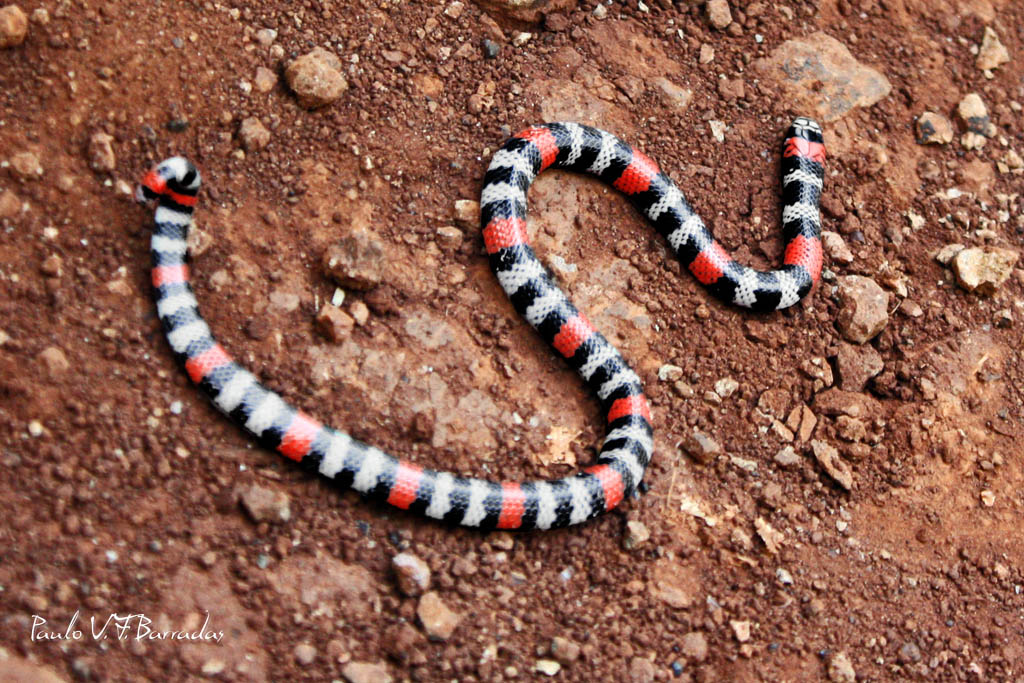

Conservation status
- Least Concern (IUCN 3.1)

Scientific classification
- Kingdom: Animalia
- Phylum: Chordata
- Class: Reptilia
- Order: Squamata
- Suborder: Serpentes
- Family: Elapidae
- Genus: Micrurus
- Species: M. baliocoryphus

Binomial name
- Micrurus baliocoryphus (Cope, 1860)
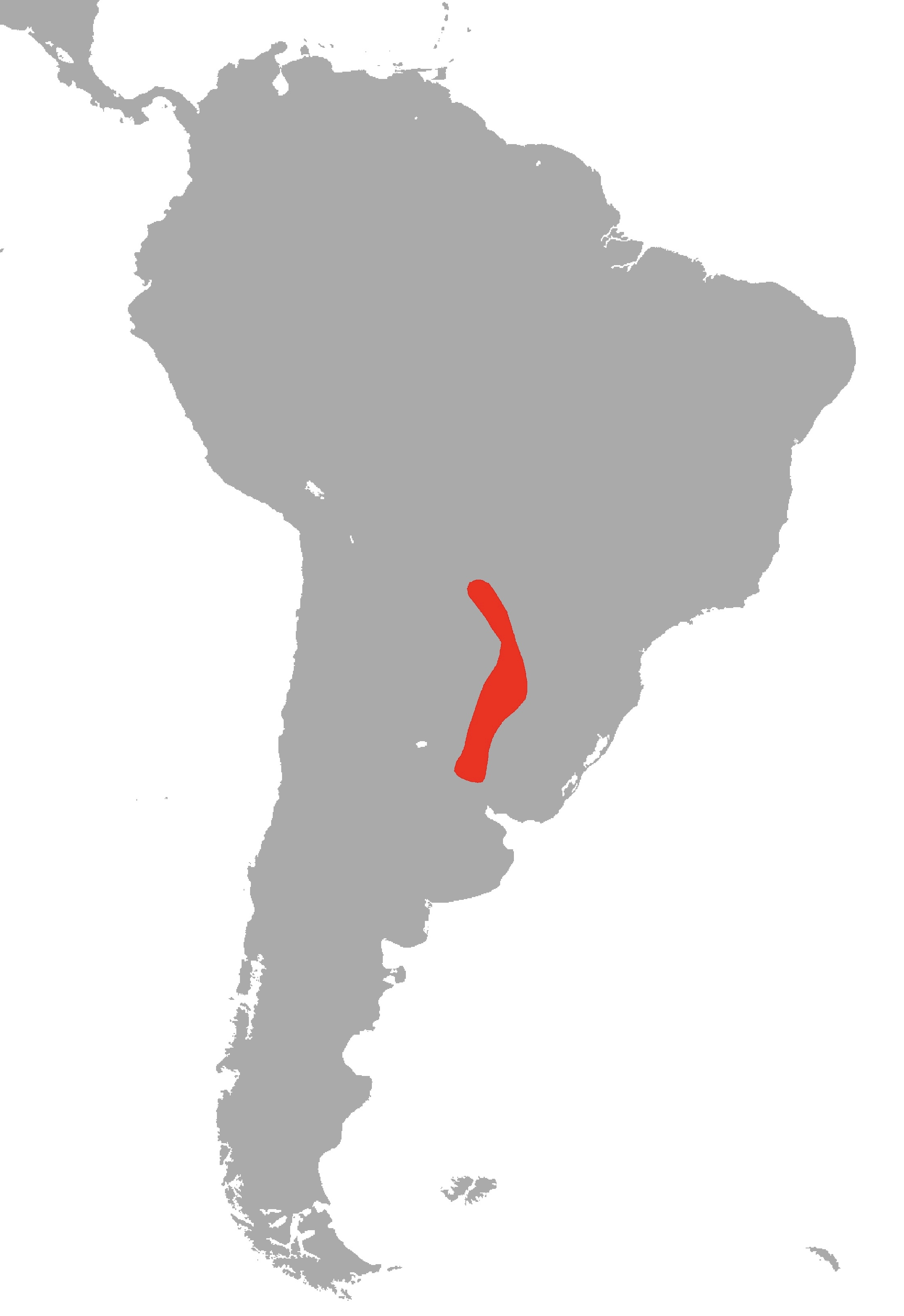

Synonyms
- Elaps baliocoryphus Cope, 1860; Elaps frontalis var. baliocoryphus Cope, 1860; Micrurus frontalis baliocoryphus (Cope, 1860); Micrurus frontalis mesopotamicus Barrio & Miranda, 1967

= Micrurus baliocoryphus =

Species of snake

Micrurus baliocoryphus, also known commonly as the Mesopotamian coral snake, is a species of coral snake in the family Elapidae. Like the other members of its family, it is venomous. It is native to central South America.

== Geographic distribution ==
Micrurus baliocoryphus is found between the Paraná River and the Uruguay River, in Argentina and Paraguay.

== Habitat ==
Micrurus baliocoryphus is found in variety of habitats, including forest, savanna, shrubland, and grassland, at elevations from sea level to 200 m (660 ft).

== Behavior ==
Micrurus baliocoryphus is terrestrial, foraging in leaf litter.

== Reproduction ==
Micrurus baliocoryphus is oviparous.
