= Micrurus scutiventris =

Conservation status
- Least Concern (IUCN 3.1)

Scientific classification
- Kingdom: Animalia
- Phylum: Chordata
- Class: Reptilia
- Order: Squamata
- Suborder: Serpentes
- Family: Elapidae
- Genus: Micrurus
- Species: M. scutiventris

Binomial name
- Micrurus scutiventris (Cope, 1869)
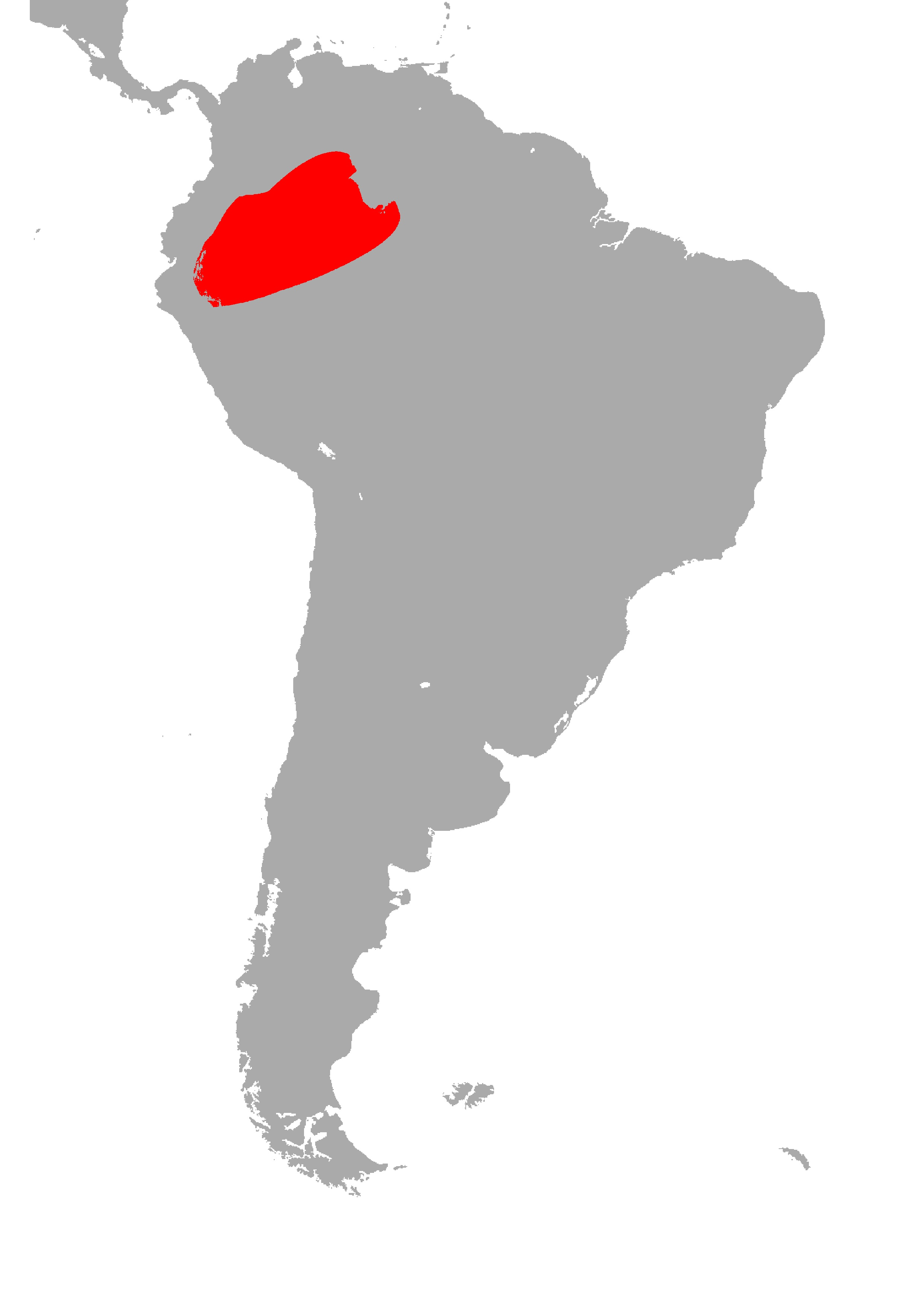

Synonyms
- Elaps scutiventris Cope, 1869; Leptomicrurus scutiventris (Cope, 1869); Leptomicrurus schmidti Hoge & Romano-Hoge, 1966; Micrurus karlschmidti Hoge & Romano-Hoge, 1972

Species of snake

Micrurus scutiventris, also known commonly as the little black coral snake and the pygmy black-backed coral snake, is a species of venomous snake in the family Elapidae. The species is native to northwestern South America.

== Local common names ==
Local common names for Micrurus scutiventris include coral negra pequeña in South American Spanish, and cobra coral pequena and cobra coral preta pequena in Brazilian Portuguese.

== Description ==
Micrurus scutiventris is a very small species of New World coral snake. Adults usually have a total length (tail included) of less than 40 cm (16 in). The holotype has a total length of 44.5 cm (17.5 in), which is the maximum recorded total length.

Dorsally, M. scutiventris is black, except for a yellow or orange band across the top of the head. Ventrally, it is black with large yellow oval spots. Each spot is about four ventrals long and may extend onto the first two rows of dorsal scales. The black spaces between the spots are also about four ventrals long. Both sexes have 26–34 ventral spots on the body. The tail has one or two red rings.

Males have 219–243 ventrals and 21–27 subcaudals, and females have 253–274 ventrals and 15–20 subcaudals.

== Geographic distribution ==
Micrurus scutiventris is found in Brazil, Colombia, Ecuador, and Peru.

== Habitat ==
The preferred natural habitat of Micrurus scutiventris is forest, at elevations of 60–1,200 m (200–3,940 ft).

== Behavior ==
Micrurus scutiventris is terrestrial, semi-fossorial, and nocturnal.

== Diet ==
Micrurus scutiventris preys upon small burrowing lizards, including species of the genus Bachia.

== Reproduction ==
Micrurus scutiventris is oviparous.

== Etymology ==
The specific names of two synonyms, karlschmidti and schmidti, are both in honor of American herpetologist Karl Patterson Schmidt.
