= Micrurus renjifoi =

Conservation status
- Data Deficient (IUCN 3.1)

Scientific classification
- Kingdom: Animalia
- Phylum: Chordata
- Order: Squamata
- Suborder: Serpentes
- Family: Elapidae
- Genus: Micrurus
- Species: M. renjifoi

Binomial name
- Micrurus renjifoi (Lamar, 2003)
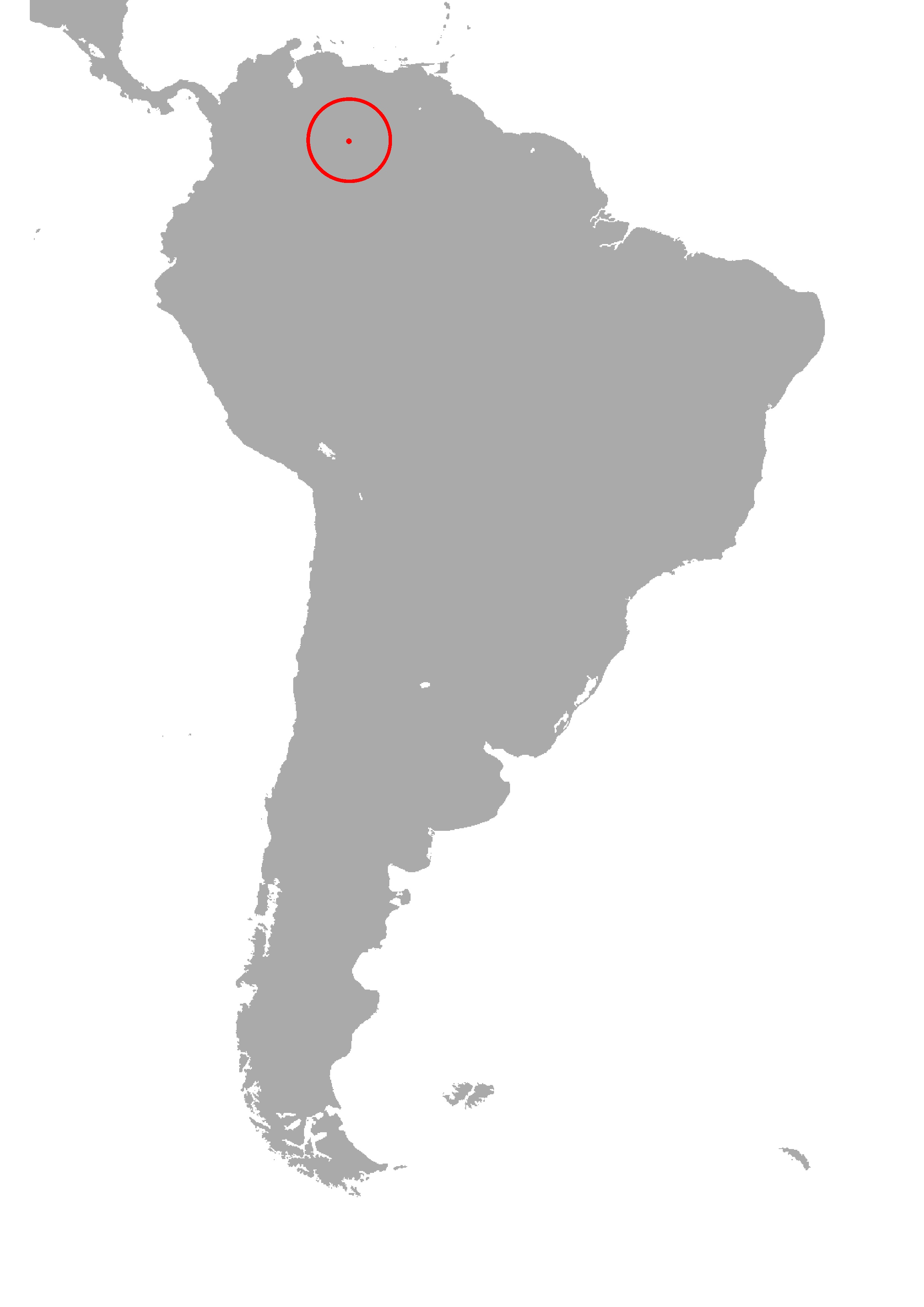

Synonyms
- Leptomicrurus renjifoi Lamar, 2003

Species of snake

Micrurus renjifoi, also known commonly as Renjifo's coral snake, is a species of venomous snake in the family Elapidae. The species is endemic to Colombia.

== Etymology ==
The specific name, renjifoi, is in honor of Colombian herpetologist Juan Manuel Renjifo.

== Description ==
Micrurus renjifoi is slender and bicolored. Its color pattern consists of alternating rings of black and pale pinkish orange. The rings are about equal in width, both colors being 4–5 dorsal scales wide. There are about 28 black rings on the body. The holotype has a total length of 427 mm (16.8 in), which includes a tail length of 1.97 mm (0.078 in). Ventral scales number 238–243, and subcaudal scales number 16–19.

== Geographic distribution ==
Micrurus renjifoi is found in eastern Colombia, in Vichada Department, near the confluence of the Tomo River with the Orinoco River.

== Habitat ==
The preferred natural habitat of Micrurus renjifoi is savanna, at elevations of 115–156 m (377–512 ft).

== Behavior ==
Micrurus renjifoi is terrestrial.

== Reproduction ==
Micrurus renjifoi is oviparous.
