= Micrurus peruvianus =

Conservation status
- Near Threatened (IUCN 3.1)

Scientific classification
- Kingdom: Animalia
- Phylum: Chordata
- Class: Reptilia
- Order: Squamata
- Suborder: Serpentes
- Family: Elapidae
- Genus: Micrurus
- Species: M. peruvianus

Binomial name
- Micrurus peruvianus Schmidt, 1936
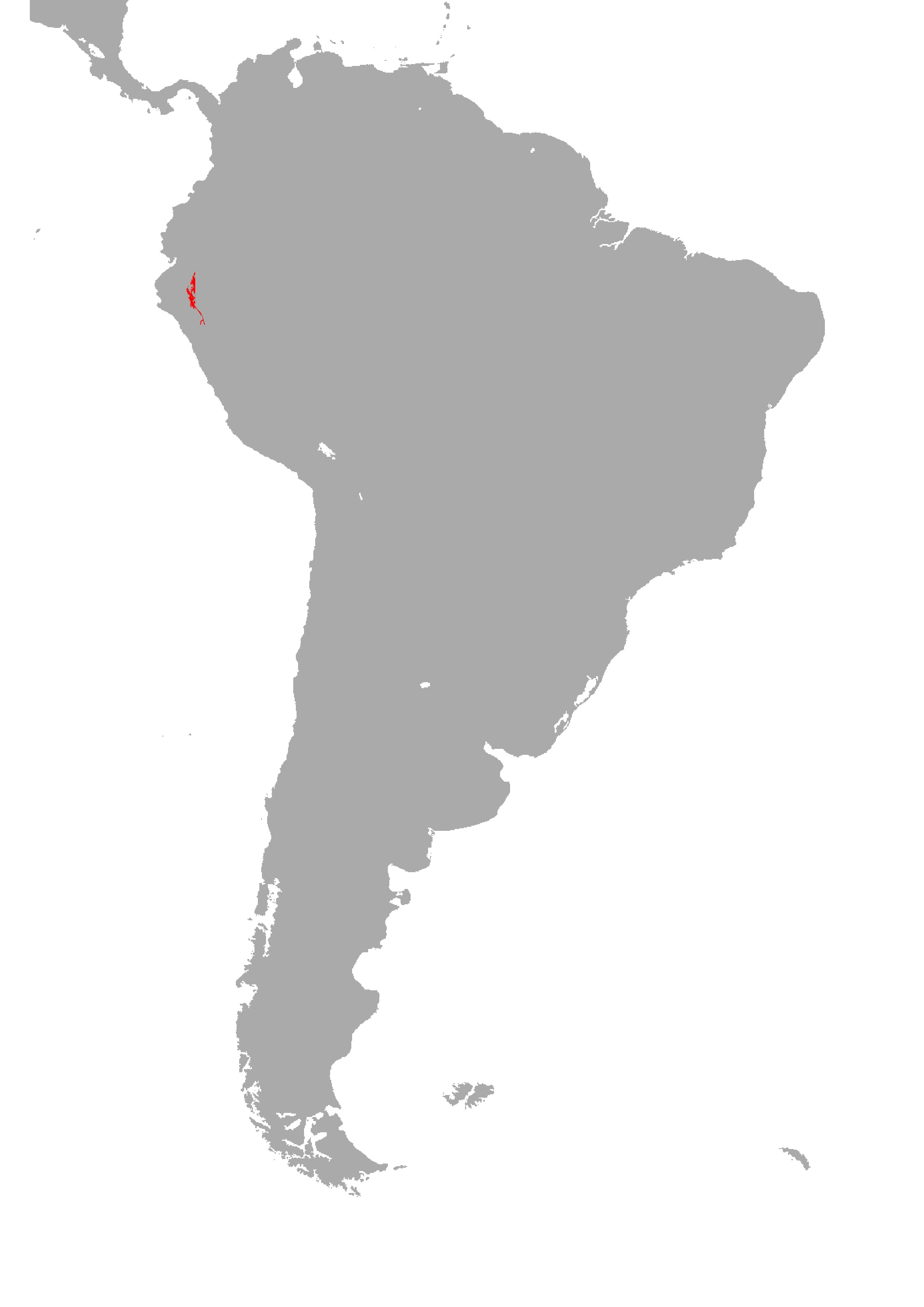

Species of snake

Micrurus peruvianus, also known commonly as the Peru coral snake and the Peruvian coral snake, is a species of venomous snake in the family Elapidae. The species is native to northwestern South America.

== Description ==
Micrurus peruvianus is a small and slender species for its genus. The holotype has a total length of 41.5 cm (16.3 in), which includes a tail length of 6.5 cm (2.6 in). The maximum recorded total length is 43.3 cm (17.0 in).

Like most New World coral snakes, the color pattern consists of red, white, and black rings. The black rings are not arranged in triads. The black rings are 3–4 dorsal scales and 2-3 ventral scales wide. The red rings are as wide as or wider than the black rings. The dorsal scales within the red rings have black tips. The white rings, which separate the black and red, are 1–1.5 dorsal scales wide, and without black tips.

Males have 186–194 ventrals and 37–40 subcaudals, and lack supraanal tubercles. Females have 196–207 ventrals and 26–30 subcaudals.

== Geographic distribution ==
Micrurus peruvianus is found in southern Ecuador (Zamora-Chinchipe) and northern Peru (Amazonas, Cajamarca).

== Habitat ==
The preferred natural habitat of Micrurus peruvianus is forest near rivers, at elevations of 450–2,217 m (1,476–7,274 ft).

== Behavior ==
Micrurus peruvianus is terrestrial.

== Reproduction ==
Micrurus peruvianus is oviparous.
