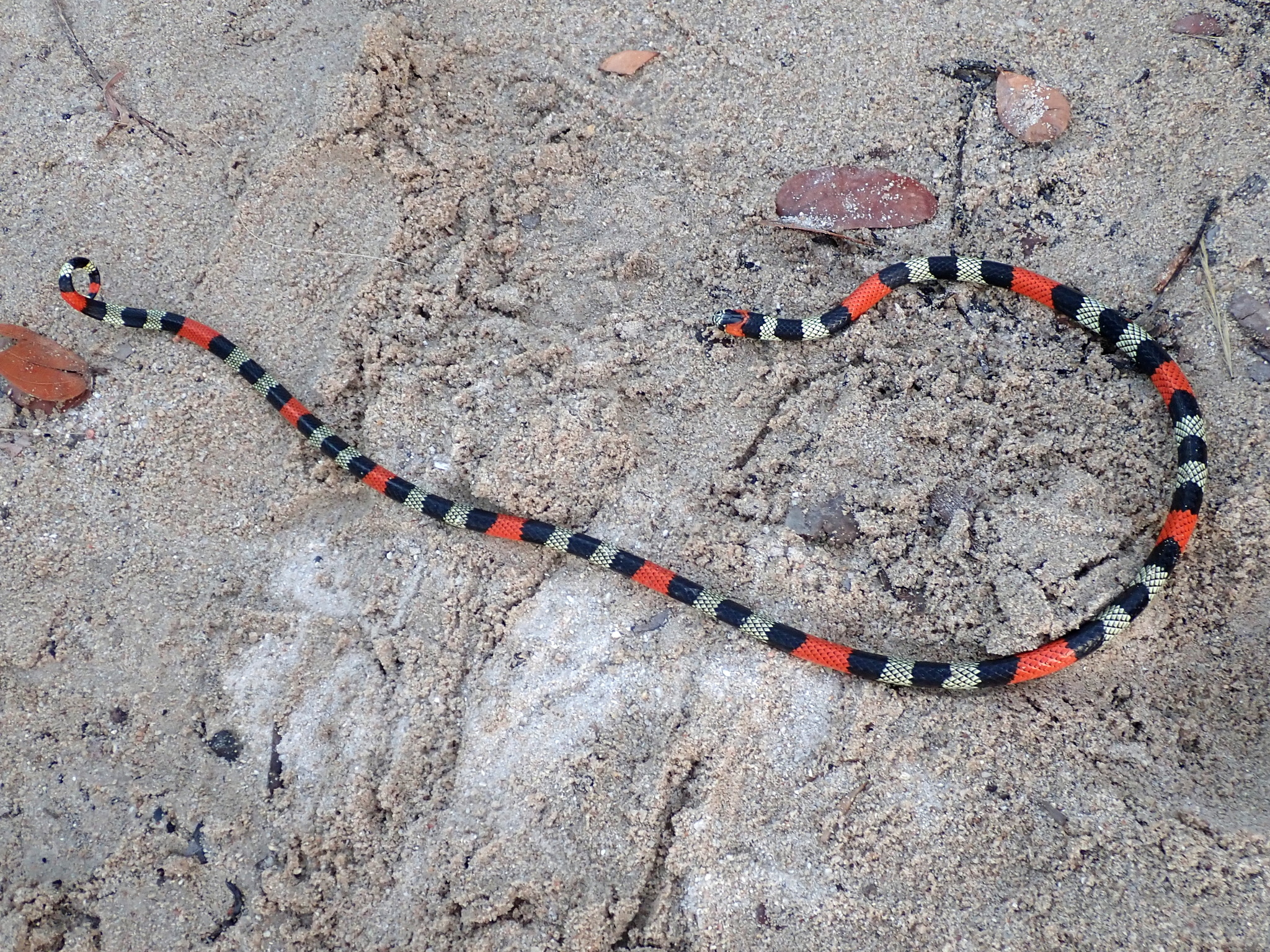

Conservation status
- Least Concern (IUCN 3.1)

Scientific classification
- Kingdom: Animalia
- Phylum: Chordata
- Class: Reptilia
- Order: Squamata
- Suborder: Serpentes
- Family: Elapidae
- Genus: Micrurus
- Species: M. brasiliensis

Binomial name
- Micrurus brasiliensis Roze, 1967
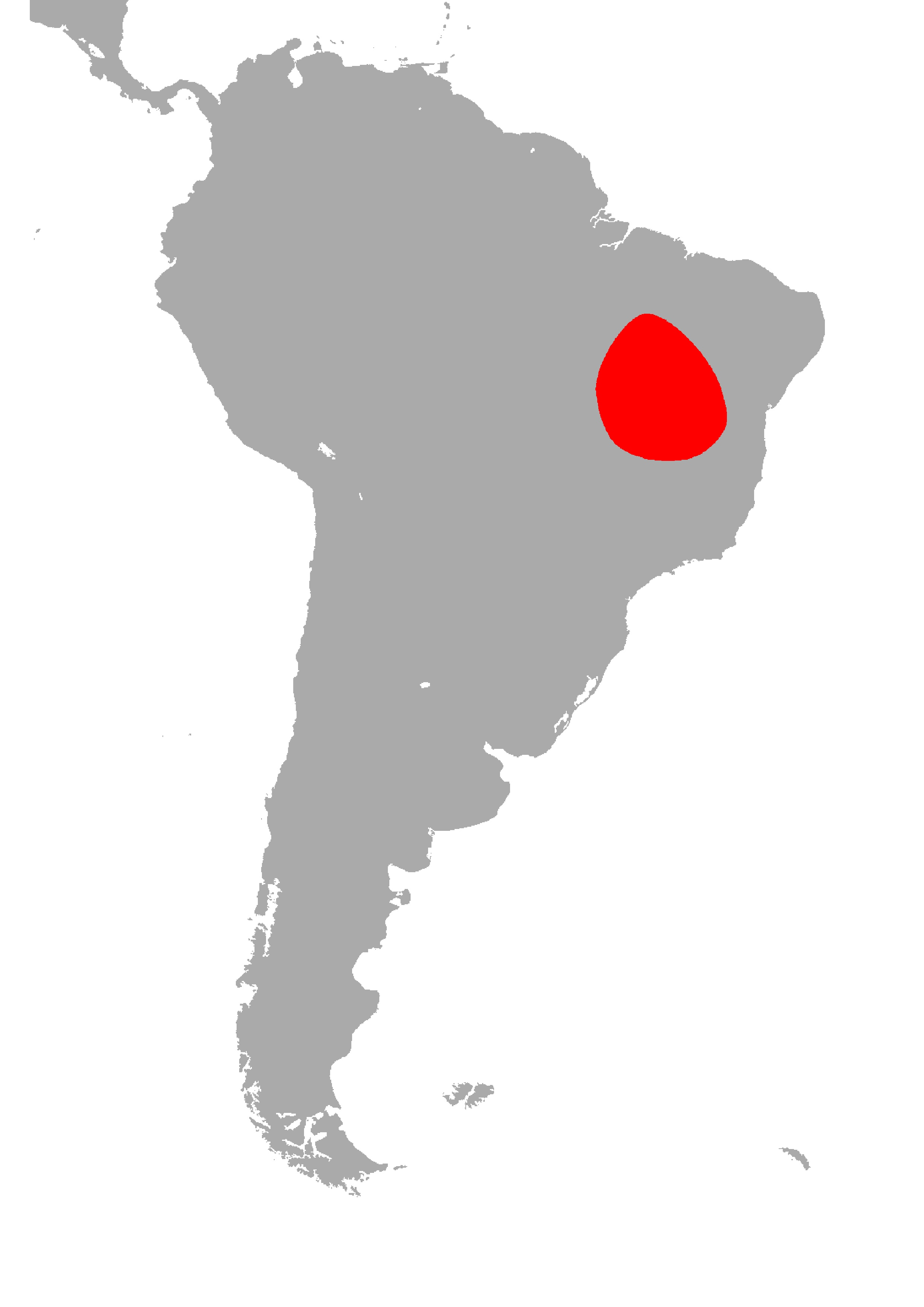

Synonyms
- Micrurus frontalis brasiliensis Roze, 1967

= Micrurus brasiliensis =

Species of snake

Micrurus brasiliensis, also known commonly as the Brazilian short-tailed coral snake, is a species of venomous snake in the family Elapidae. The species is endemic to Brazil.

== Description ==
Micrurus brasiliensis may attain a total length (tail included) of 86.5 cm (34.1 in). The snout is white, and the white rings of the triads are as wide as or wider than the black rings.

== Geographic distribution ==
Micrurus brasiliensis is found in the Brazilian states of Bahia, Goiás, Maranhão, Minas Gerais, and Tocantins.

== Habitat ==
The preferred natural habitats of Micrurus brasiliensis are forest, savanna, and grassland with sandy soil, at elevations from sea level to 700 m (2,300 ft).

== Behavior ==
Micrurus brasiliensis is terrestrial.

== Diet ==
Micrurus brasiliensis preys upon amphisbaenians and snakes.

== Reproduction ==
Micrurus brasiliensis is oviparous.
