= Micrurus hippocrepis =

Conservation status
- Least Concern (IUCN 3.1)

Scientific classification
- Kingdom: Animalia
- Phylum: Chordata
- Class: Reptilia
- Order: Squamata
- Suborder: Serpentes
- Family: Elapidae
- Genus: Micrurus
- Species: M. hippocrepis

Binomial name
- Micrurus hippocrepis (W. Peters, 1861)
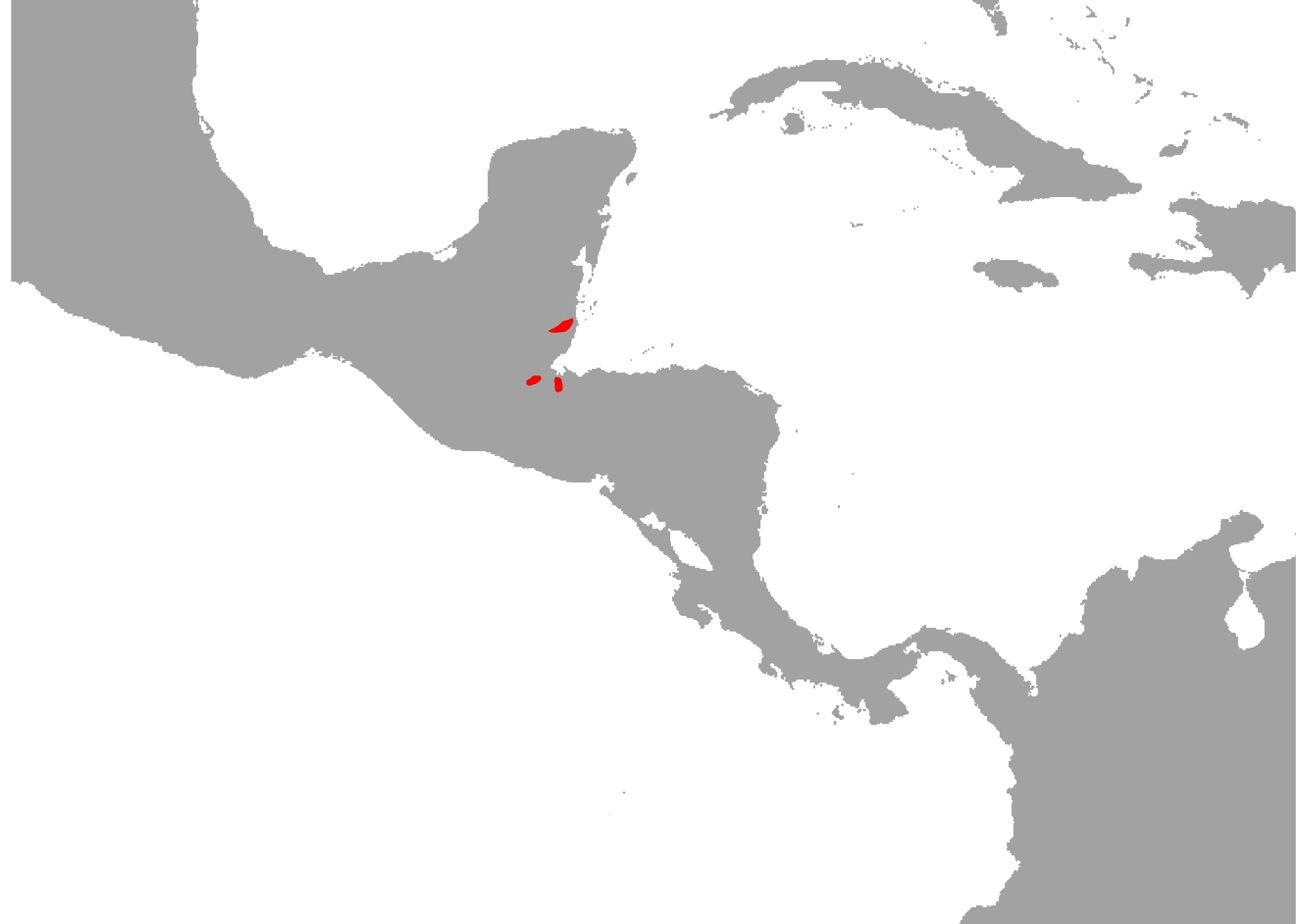

Synonyms
- Elaps hippocrepis W. Peters, 1861; Micrurus affinis hippocrepis (W. Peters, 1861)

Species of snake

Micrurus hippocrepis, also known commonly as the Belize coral snake, the Mayan coral snake, and coralillo de Belize in Central American Spanish, is a species of venomous snake in the family Elapidae. The species is native to Central America. There are no subspecies that are recognized as being valid.

== Description ==
Medium-sized for the genus Micrurus, adults of Micrurus hippocrepis usually have a total length (tail included) of 47–65 cm (19–26 in), and the longest recorded total length is 71 cm (28 in).

Like most coral snakes the color pattern consists of red, black, and yellow rings. The red rings are extremely wide. The black rings are narrow and not arranged in triads. The yellow rings, which separate the red from the black, are the narrowest.

== Geographic distribution ==
Micrurus hippocrepis is found in Belize and Guatemala.

== Habitat ==
The preferred natural habitat of Micrurus hippocrepis is forest, at elevations of 50–600 m (160–1,970 ft).

== Behavior ==
Micrurus hippocrepis is terrestrial and semifossorial.

== Diet ==
Micrurus hippocrepis preys upon small snakes of the family Colubridae, especially Ninia sebae.

== Reproduction ==
Micrurus hippocrepis is oviparous.

== Etymology ==
The specific name hippocrepis, Greek for "horseshoe", refers to a marking on the snake's head which may resemble a horseshoe.
