= Micrurus stuarti =

Conservation status
- Least Concern (IUCN 3.1)

Scientific classification
- Kingdom: Animalia
- Phylum: Chordata
- Class: Reptilia
- Order: Squamata
- Suborder: Serpentes
- Family: Elapidae
- Genus: Micrurus
- Species: M. stuarti

Binomial name
- Micrurus stuarti Roze, 1967
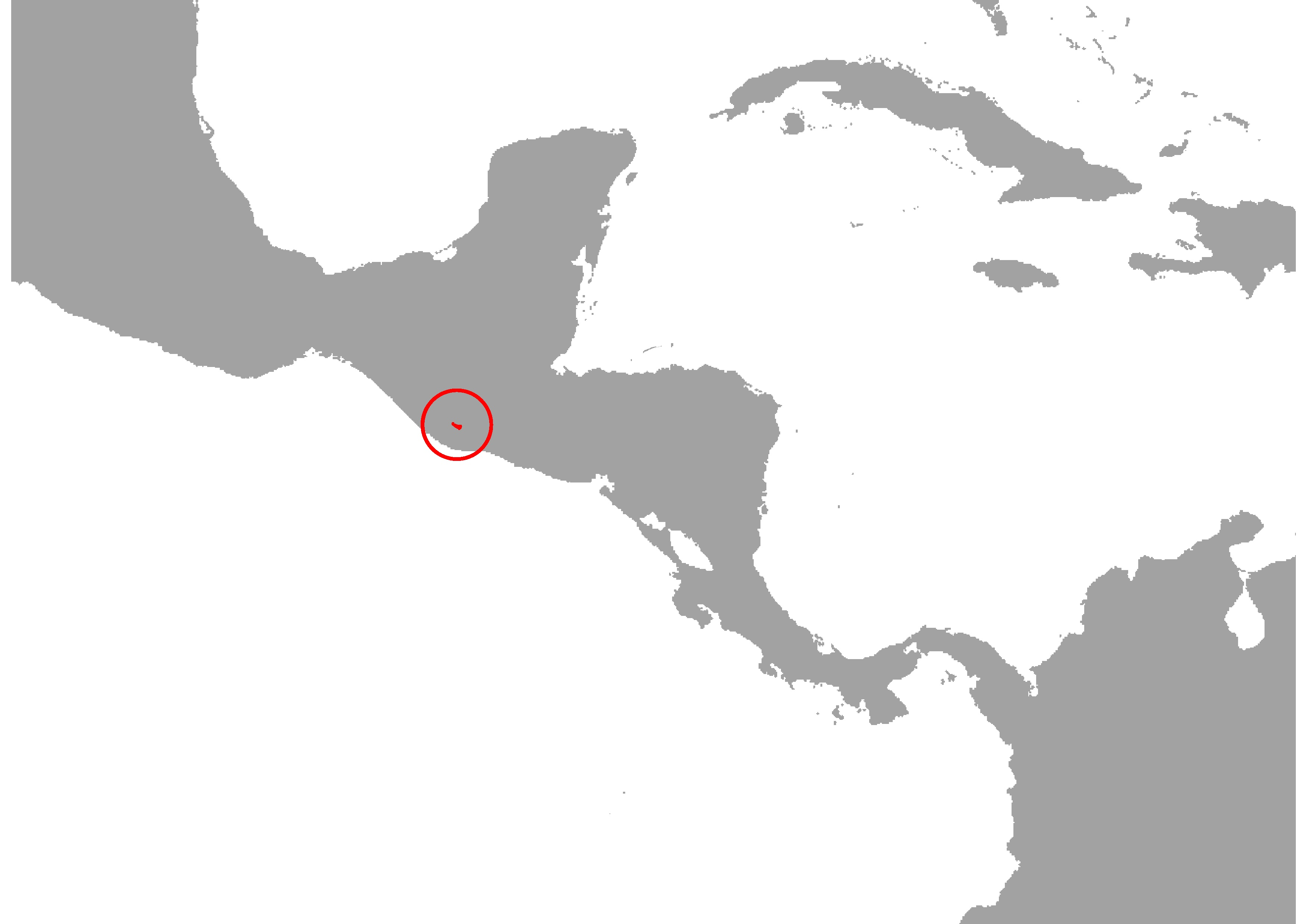

Species of reptile

Micrurus stuarti, also known commonly as Stuart's coral snake and the volcano coral snake, is a species of venomous snake in the family Elapidae. The species is endemic to Guatemala. There are no recognized subspecies.

== Etymology ==
The specific name, stuarti, is in honor of American herpetologist Laurence Cooper Stuart.

== Local common names ==
Local common names for Micrurus stuarti, in New World Spanish, include coral de los volcanes and coral de Stuart.

== Description ==
Micrurus stuarti can grow to a total length (tail included) of 74 cm (29 in), but most are closer to 50–60 cm (20–24 in).

A tricolored New World coral snake, its color pattern consists of 13–19 relatively broad black rings and very broad red rings, separated by narrow yellow rings. The black rings are not grouped in triads. The dorsal scales are smooth, and the red ones are black-tipped. The number of broad black rings on the tail may vary from 3 to 4, separated by narrow red-brown rings.

M. stuarti exhibits sexual dimorphism in color pattern and scalation. Males have 13–14 black rings on the body, and females have 16–19 black rings on the body. Males have 210–215 ventrals and 45–49 subcaudals, and females have 224–231 ventrals and 37–39 subcaudals.

== Geographic range and habitat ==
Micrurus stuarti has only been found on the Pacific versant of southwestern Guatemala. Its habitat consists of subtropical wet forest and lower montane wet forest, at elevations of 800–1,600 m (2,600–5,200 ft). It may also occur in similar adjacent habitats in southeastern Mexico.

== Behavior ==
Micrurus stuarti is terrestrial and semi-fossorial.

== Reproduction ==
M. stuarti is oviparous.
