= Micrurus collaris =

Conservation status
- Least Concern (IUCN 3.1)

Scientific classification
- Kingdom: Animalia
- Phylum: Chordata
- Class: Reptilia
- Order: Squamata
- Suborder: Serpentes
- Family: Elapidae
- Genus: Micrurus
- Species: M. collaris

Binomial name
- Micrurus collaris (Schlegel, 1837)
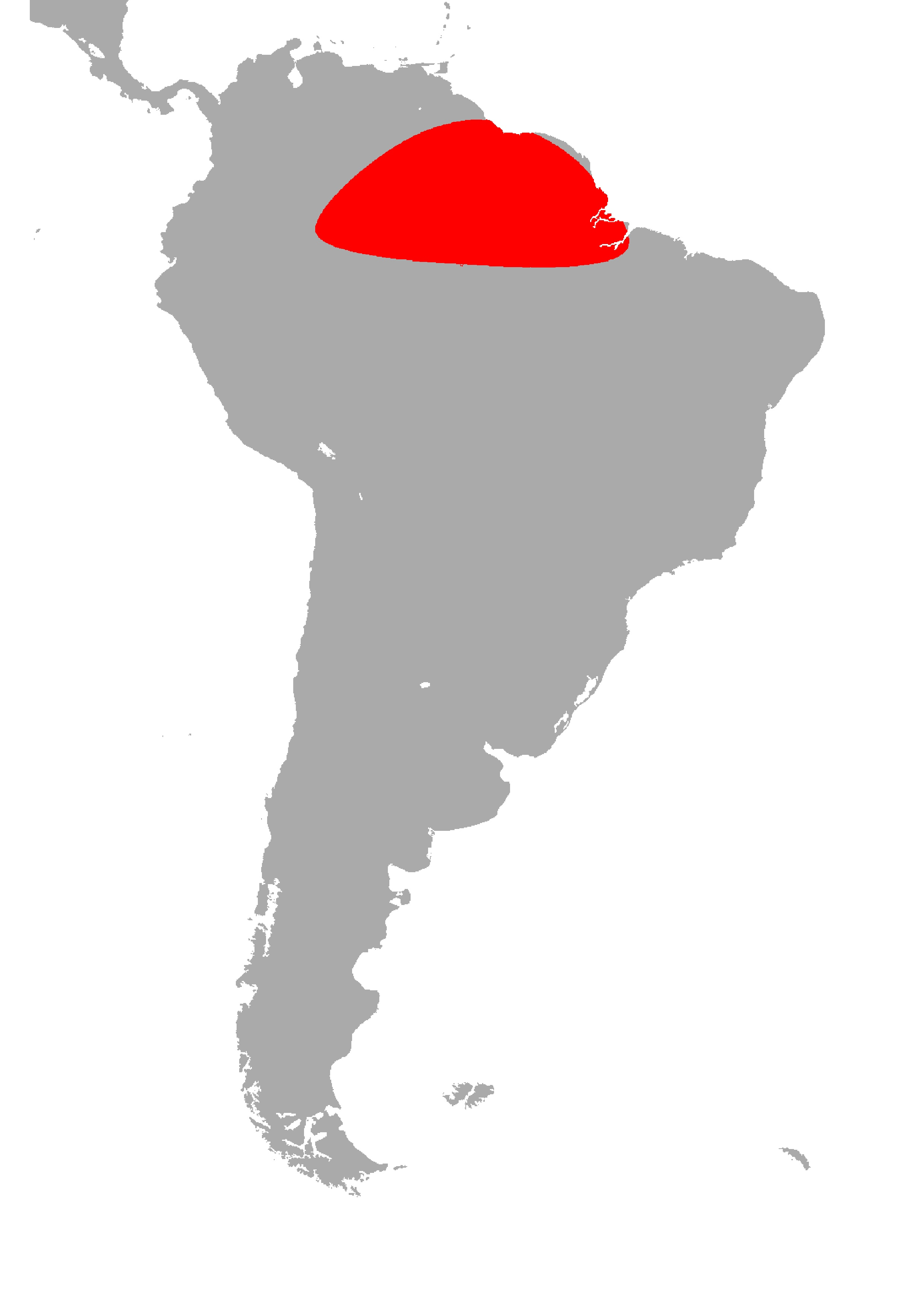

Synonyms
- Elaps collaris Schlegel, 1837; Hemibungarus collaris (Schlegel, 1837); Leptomicrurus collaris (Schlegel, 1837); Elaps gastrodelus A.M.C. Duméril, Bibron & A.H.A. Duméril, 1854

Species of snake

Micrurus collaris, also known commonly as the Guianan black-backed coral snake, the Guyana blackback coral snake, coral espalda-negra guayanesa in Spanish, and cobra coral costas-preta guianesa in Portuguese, is a species of venomous snake in the family Elapidae. The species is native to northern South America. There are two recognized subspecies.

== Geographic distribution ==
Micrurus collaris is found in Brazil (Roraima, Amapá), French Guiana, Guyana, and eastern Venezuela (Bolívar).

The type locality of the subspecies Micrurus collaris breviventris is "Oko Mountains, Essequibo, Guyana".

== Habitat ==
The preferred natural habitat of Micrurus collaris is forest at elevations from sea level to 800 m (2,600 ft).

== Behavior ==
Micrurus collaris is terrestrial and semifossorial.

== Reproduction ==
Micrurus collaris is oviparous.

== Subspecies ==
Two subspecies are recognized as being valid, including the nominotypical subspecies.

- Micrurus collaris breviventris (Roze & Bernal-Carlo, 1988)
- Micrurus collaris collaris (Schlegel, 1837)

Nota bene: A trinomial authority in parentheses indicates that the subspecies was originally described in a species other than Micrurus.
