= Micrurus pacaraimae =

Conservation status
- Least Concern (IUCN 3.1)

Scientific classification
- Kingdom: Animalia
- Phylum: Chordata
- Class: Reptilia
- Order: Squamata
- Suborder: Serpentes
- Family: Elapidae
- Genus: Micrurus
- Species: M. pacaraimae

Binomial name
- Micrurus pacaraimae Morato de Carvalho, 2002
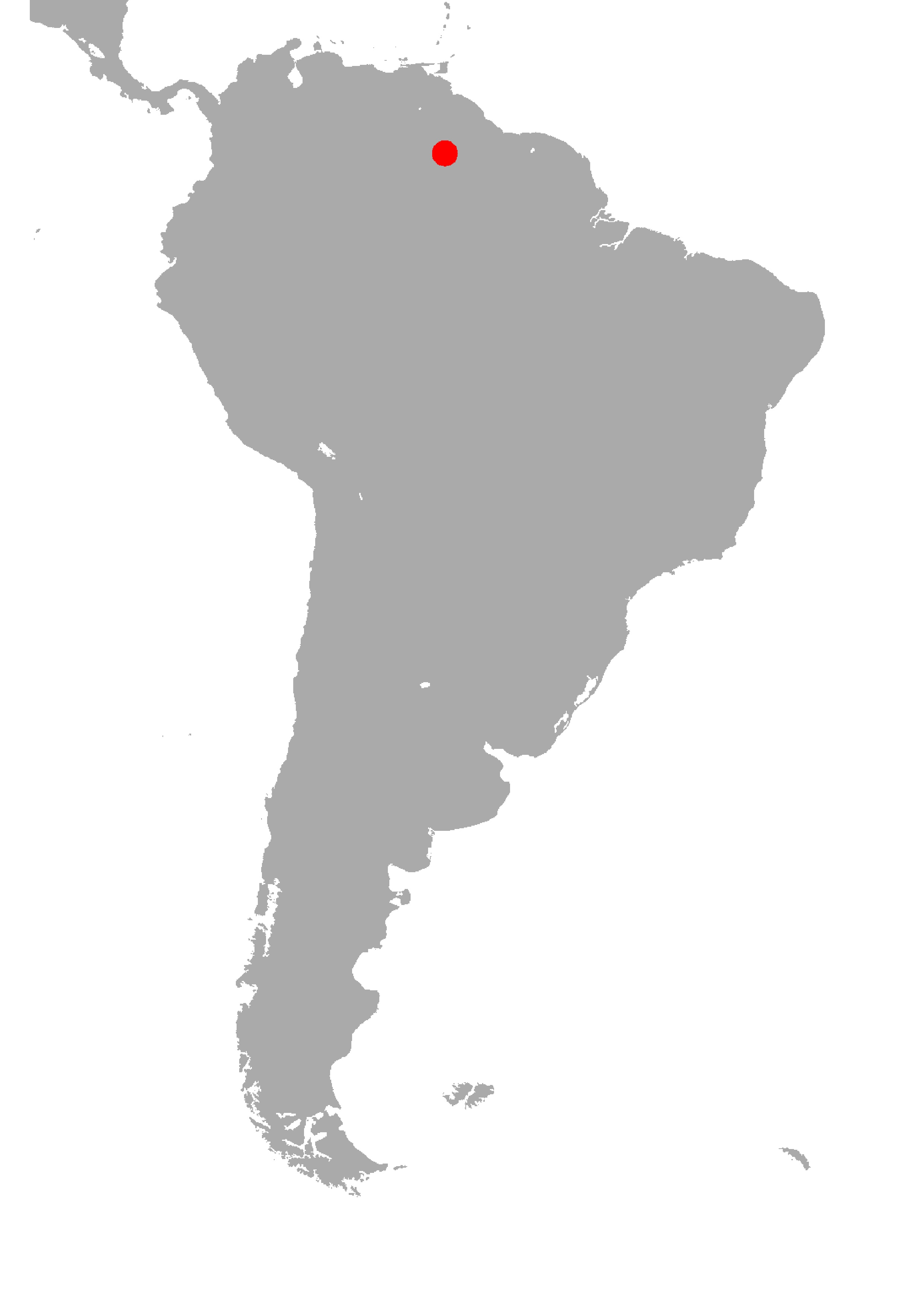

Species of snake

Micrurus pacaraimae, also known commonly as the Pacaraima coral snake and cobra coral vermelha in Brazilian Portuguese, is a species of venomous snake in the family Elapidae. The species is endemic to Brazil

== Description ==
Micrurus pacaraimae is small for its genus. The holotype, a male, has a snout-to-vent length of 313 mm (12.3 in), plus a tail length of 42 mm (1.7 in).

The color pattern consists of alternating red and black rings. The red rings are approximately four times wider than the black rings. There are 23 black rings.

The male has 201 ventrals, and 43 subcaudals. It does not have supraanal tubercles.

== Geographic distribution ==
Micrurus pacaraimae is found in the northern Brazilian state of Roraima.

== Habitat ==
The preferred natural habitat of Micrurus pacaraimae is forest, at elevations of approximately 920 m (3,020 ft).

== Behavior ==
Micrurus pacaraimae is terrestrial.

== Reproduction ==
Micrurus pacaraimae is oviparous.
