= Micrurus silviae =

Conservation status
- Vulnerable (IUCN 3.1)

Scientific classification
- Kingdom: Animalia
- Phylum: Chordata
- Class: Reptilia
- Order: Squamata
- Suborder: Serpentes
- Family: Elapidae
- Genus: Micrurus
- Species: M. silviae

Binomial name
- Micrurus silviae Di Bernardo, Borges-Martins & da Silva Jr., 2007
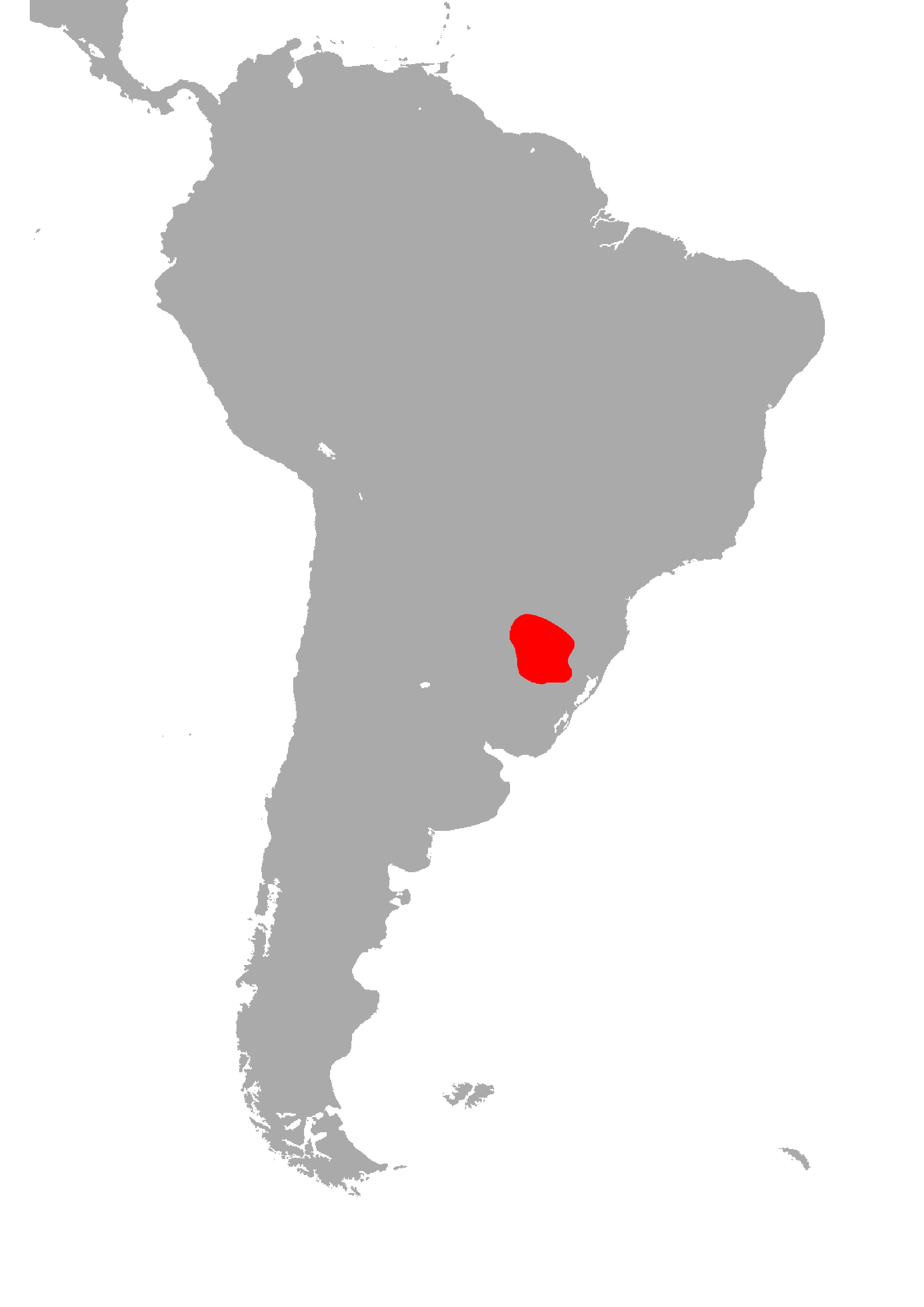

Species of snake

Micrurus silviae, also known commonly as Silvia's coral snake, is a species of venomous snake in the family Elapidae. The species is native to southeastern South America.

== Description ==
Like many other New World coral snakes, the color pattern of Micrurus silviae consists of red, white, and black rings, with the black rings arranged in triads. The middle black ring of each triad is 1.5–2 times wider than the outer black rings. The white rings are slightly narrower than the outer black rings. The dorsal scales of the white rings are so heavily edged and tipped with black that the white rings appear to be gray from a distance. The snout is mostly black, and the top of the head is completely black.

== Geographic distribution ==
Micrurus silviae is found in northeastern Argentina (Corrientes, Misiones), southern Brazil (Rio Grande do Sul), and southeastern Paraguay.

== Habitat ==
The preferred natural habitats of Micrurus silviae are grassland and savanna, at elevations of 100–700 m (330–2,300 ft).

== Behavior ==
Micrurus siliae is terrestrial.

== Reproduction ==
Micrurus silviae is oviparous.

== Etymology ==
The specific name, silviae, is in honor of Brazilian herpetologist Silvia Di Bernardo, who died suddenly of a cerebral aneurysm in 2002. She was the first wife of Brazilian herpetologist Marcos Di Bernardo.
