= Micrurus oligoanellatus =

Conservation status
- Data Deficient (IUCN 3.1)

Scientific classification
- Kingdom: Animalia
- Phylum: Chordata
- Class: Reptilia
- Order: Squamata
- Suborder: Serpentes
- Family: Elapidae
- Genus: Micrurus
- Species: M. oligoanellatus

Binomial name
- Micrurus oligoanellatus Ayerbe & López, 2002
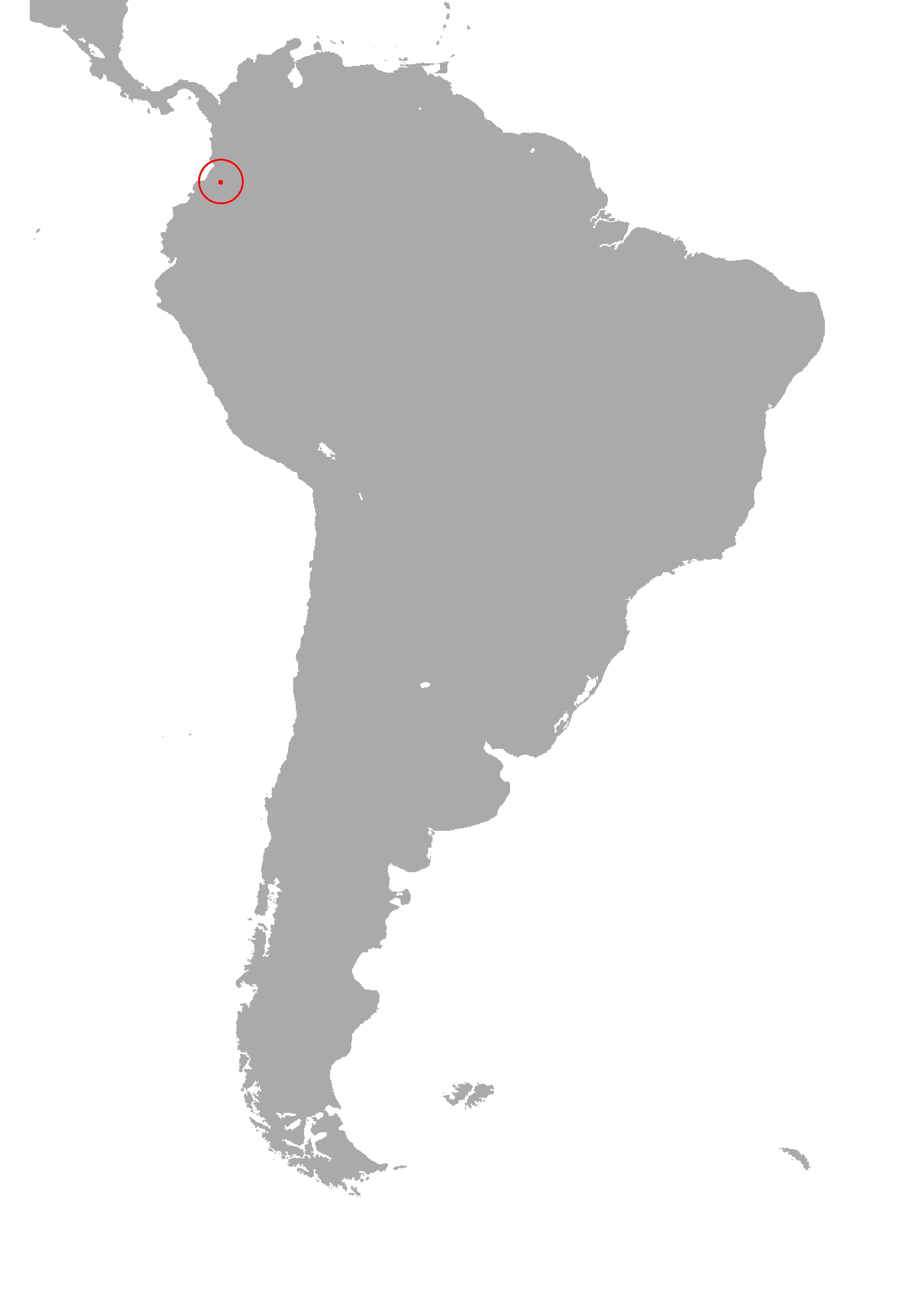

Species of snake

Micrurus oligoanellatus, also known commonly as Tambito's coral snake, is a species of venomous snake in the family Elapidae. The species is endemic to Colombia.

== Description ==
Micrurus oligoanellatus is small and slender for its genus. It may attain a total length (tail included) of 62.5 cm (24.6 in).

Like many New World coral snakes, the color pattern of its body consists of red, black, and white rings. It can be distinguished from similar species by the following combination of characteristics. The red rings are widest (21 dorsal scales wide). The black rings are much narrower (three scales) and not grouped in triads. The white rings, which separate the red and black, are narrowest (one scale). There is no black nuchal band. The overall appearance is that of a red snake with few widely spaced black rings on the body. The short tail is uniformly black dorsally, and has three white crossbars and three black crossbars ventrally.

There are 232 ventrals, and 29 subcaudals.

== Geographic distribution ==
Micrurus oligoanellatus is found in Cauca Department, Colombia.

== Habitat ==
The preferred natural habitat of Micrurus oligoanellatus is forest, at elevations of 1,000–1,500 m (3,300–4,900 ft).

== Behavior ==
Micrurus oligoanellatus is terrestrial.

== Reproduction ==
Micrurus oligoanellatus is oviparous.
