= Micrurus boicora =

Scientific classification
- Kingdom: Animalia
- Phylum: Chordata
- Class: Reptilia
- Order: Squamata
- Suborder: Serpentes
- Family: Elapidae
- Genus: Micrurus
- Species: M. boicora

Binomial name
- Micrurus boicora Bernarde, Turci, Abegg & Franco, 2018

Species of snake

Micrurus boicora is a species of venomous snake in the family Elapidae. The species is endemic to Brazil.

== Geographic range ==
Micrurus boicora is known from southern Rondônia and northern Mato Grosso, Brazil.

== Taxonomy ==
Micrurus boicora is a member of the Micrurus hemprichii species complex.

== Description ==
Micrurus boicora can be distinguished from its congeners by its dark dorsal coloration, thin white rings, a reddish ring around the neck, and bright orange-red on the tail. Its ventral coloration is dark with white splotches and a reddish gular area.
