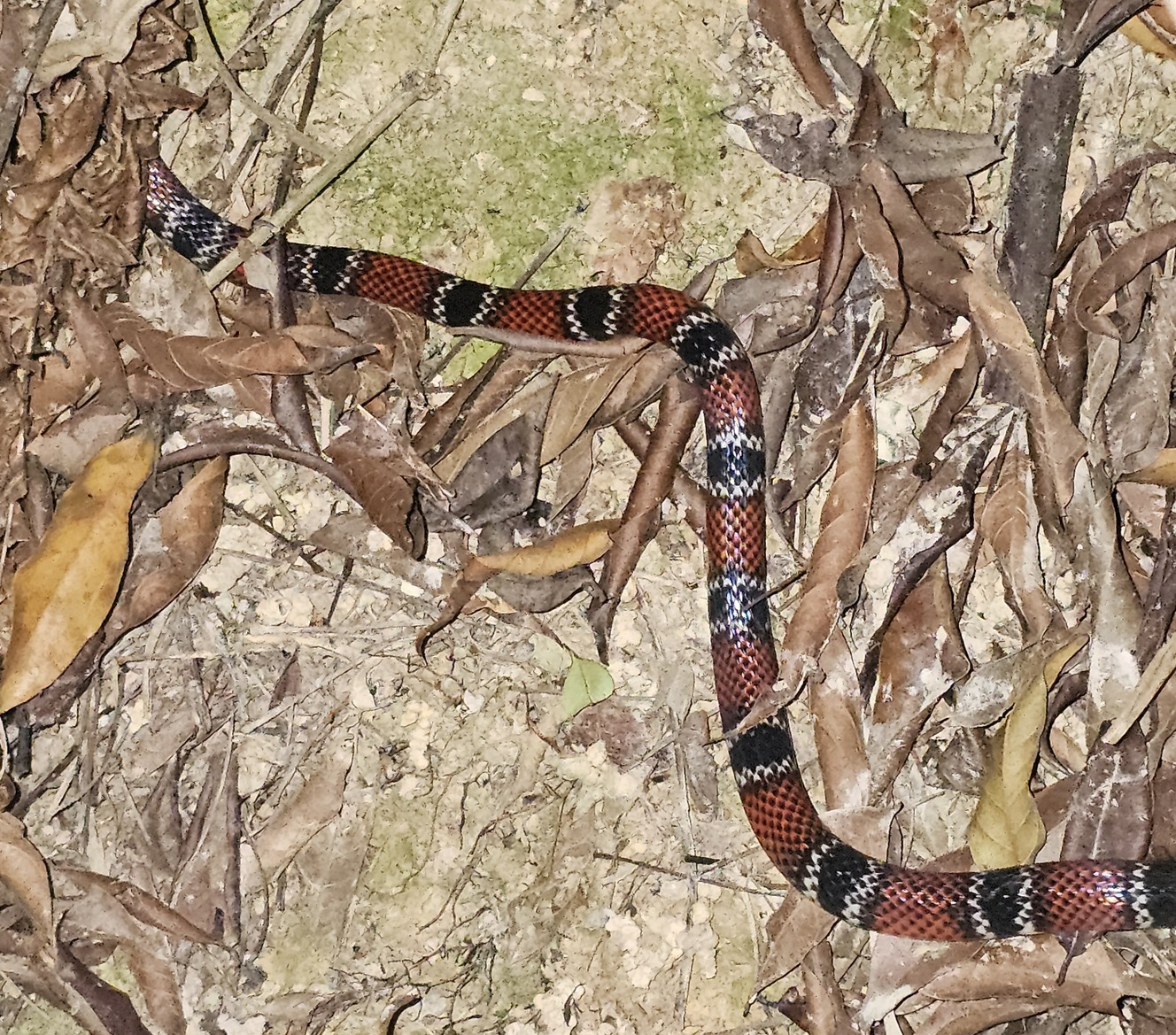

Conservation status
- Vulnerable (IUCN 3.1)

Scientific classification
- Kingdom: Animalia
- Phylum: Chordata
- Class: Reptilia
- Order: Squamata
- Suborder: Serpentes
- Family: Elapidae
- Genus: Micrurus
- Species: M. sangilensis

Binomial name
- Micrurus sangilensis Nicéforo María, 1942
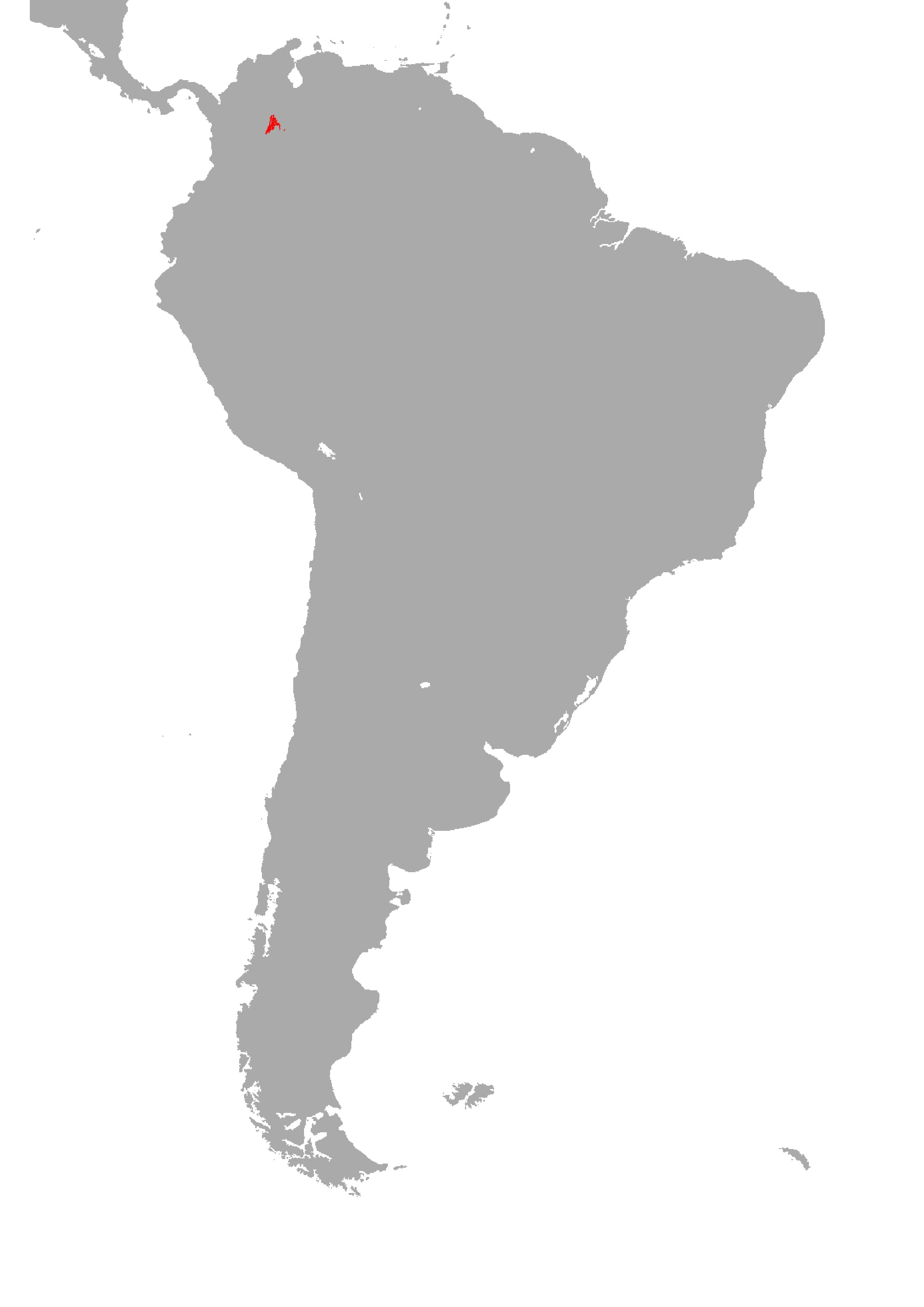

Synonyms
- Micrurus ecuadorianus sangilensis Nicéroro María, 1942; Micrurus bocourti sangilensis Nicéforo María, 1942

= Micrurus sangilensis =

Species of snake

Micrurus sangilensis, also known commonly as the San Gil coral snake, the Santander coral snake, and coral sangilense in South American Spanish, is a species of venomous snake in the family Elapidae. The species is endemic to Colombia.

== Description ==
Medium-sized for the genus Micrurus, adults of Micrurus sangilensis usually have a total length (tail included) of 45–55 cm (18–22 in). The maximum recorded total length is 60 cm (24 in).

Like many other New World coral snakes, the color pattern consists of red, white (or yellow), and black rings, with the black rings arranged in triads. The central black ring of each triad is 2–3 times wider than the outer black rings. The central black rings are 3–4 dorsals wide, and outer black rings are 1–2 dorsals wide. The white rings are 1–1.5 dorsals wide, irregular, and spotted with black. The red rings are 4–10 dorsals wide, with some dorsals having black tips. Both males and females have 17–19 complete triads on the body.

Males have 190–196 ventrals and 47–53 subcaudals, and lack supraanal tubercles. Females have 207–215 ventrals and 35–37 subcaudals.

== Geographic distribution ==
Micrurus sangilensis is found in central Colombia, in the Cordillera Oriental of the Andes, in the departments of Boyacá, Cundinamarca, and Santander.

== Habitat ==
The preferred natural habitat of Micrurus sangilensis is forest, at elevations of 1,018–1,737 m (3,340–5,699 ft), but it has also been found in artificial and disturbed habitats such as coffee plantations and towns.

== Behavior ==
Micrurus sangilensis is terrestrial.

== Reproduction ==
Micrurus sangilensis is oviparous.
