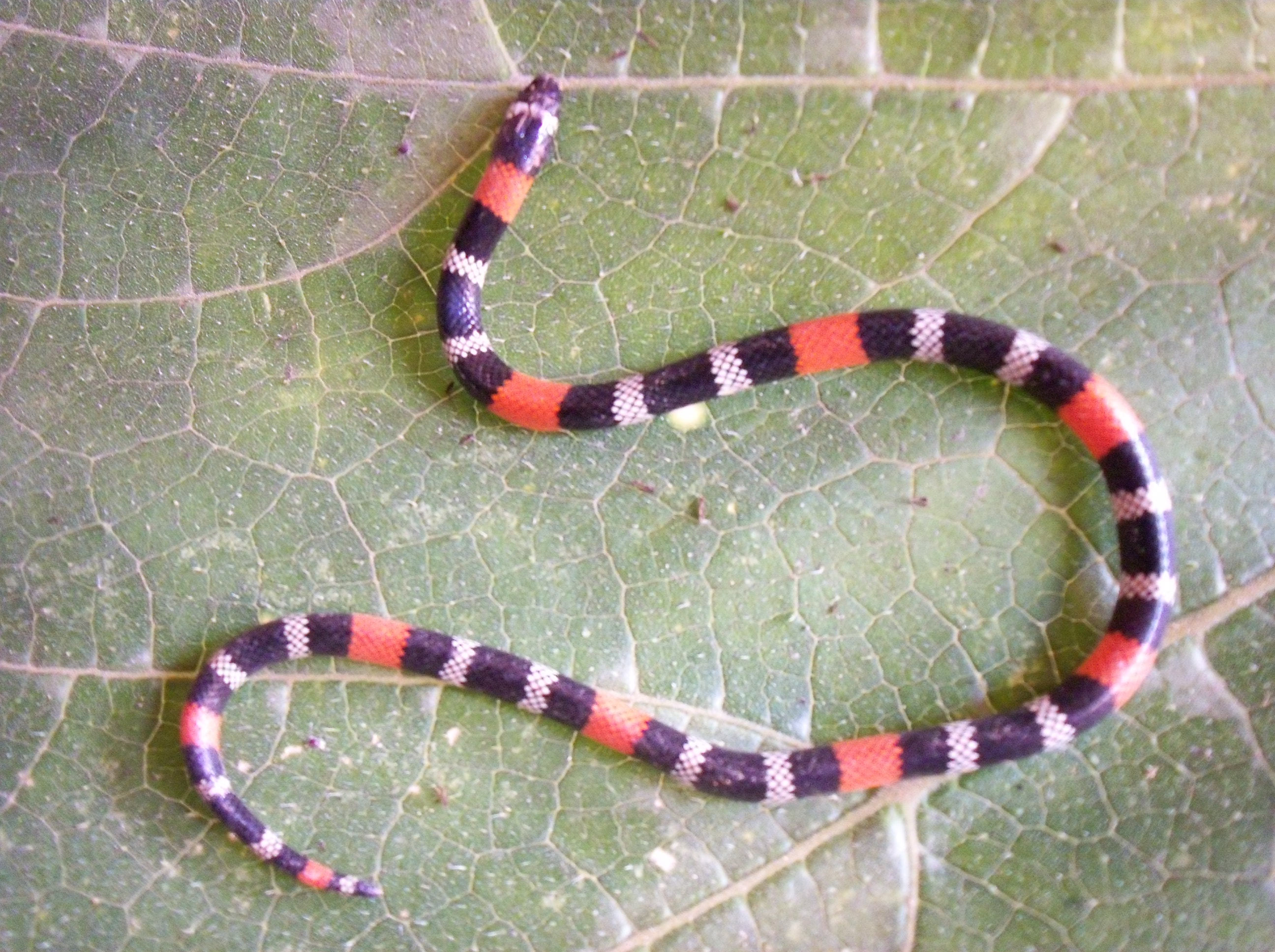

Conservation status
- Least Concern (IUCN 3.1)

Scientific classification
- Kingdom: Animalia
- Phylum: Chordata
- Class: Reptilia
- Order: Squamata
- Suborder: Serpentes
- Family: Elapidae
- Genus: Micrurus
- Species: M. dissoleucus

Binomial name
- Micrurus dissoleucus (Cope, 1860)
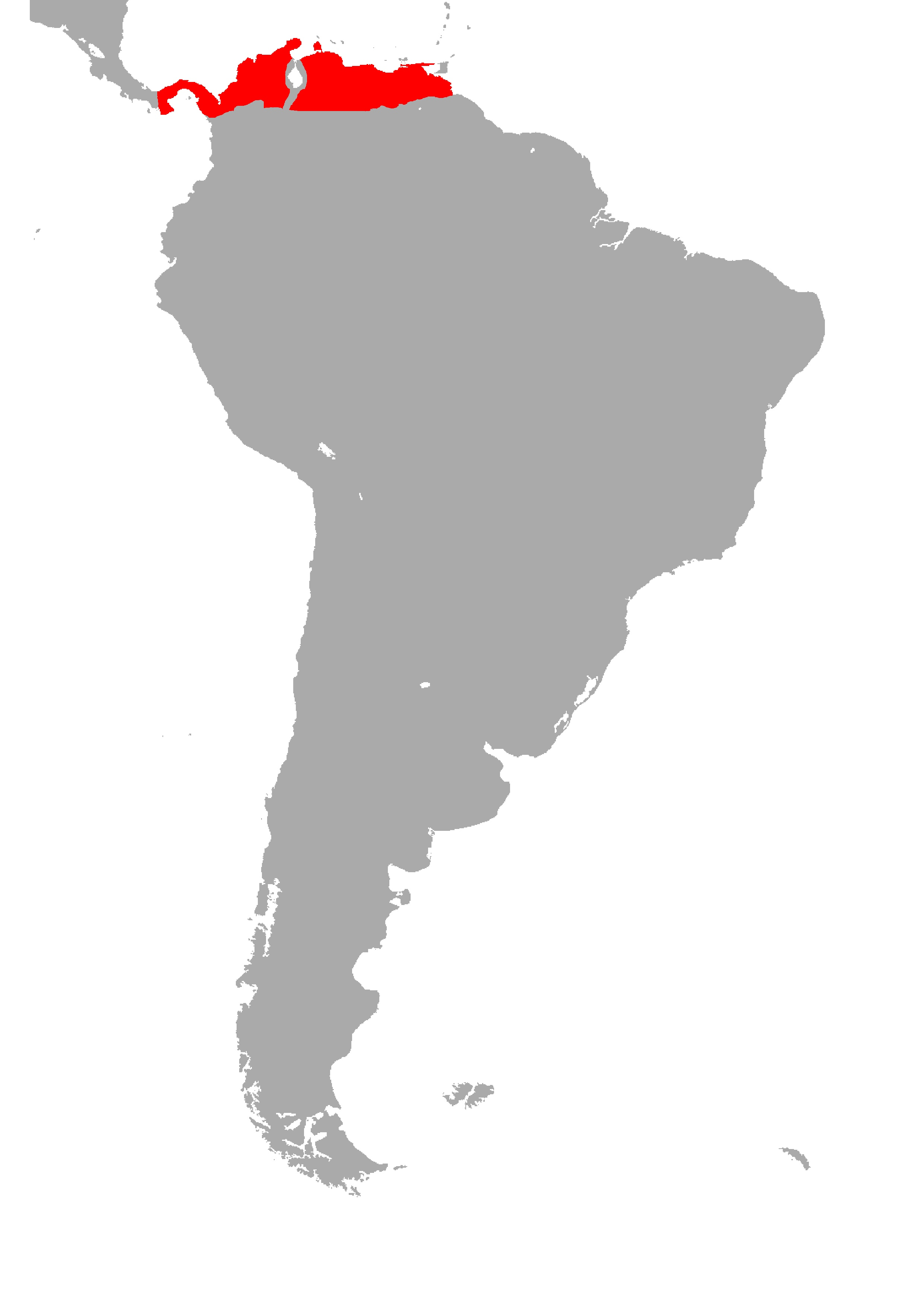

Synonyms
- Elaps dissoleucus Cope, 1860

= Micrurus dissoleucus =

Species of snake

Micrurus dissoleucus, also known commonly as the pygmy coral snake and la candelilla in Spanish, is a species of venomous snake in the family Elapidae. The species is native to extreme southern Central America and extreme northern South America. There are four recognized subspecies.

== Description ==
Very small for the genus Micrurus, adults of Micrurus dissoleucus usually have a total length (tail included) of 28–45 cm (11–18 in).

== Geographic distribution ==
Micrurus dissoleucus is found in northern Colombia, Panama, and northern Venezuela.

== Habitat ==
Micrurus dissoleucus is found in a variety of habitats, including forest, savanna, shrubland, deforested areas, and towns, at elevations from sea level to 1,000 m (3,300 ft).

== Behavior ==
Micrurus dissoleucus is terrestrial.

== Reproduction ==
Micrurus dissoleucus is oviparous.

== Subspecies ==
Four subspecies are recognized as being valid, including the nominotypical subspecies.

- Micrurus dissoleucus dissoleucus (Cope, 1860)
- Micrurus dissoleucus dunni Barbour, 1923
- Micrurus dissoleucus melanogenys (Cope, 1860)
- Micrurus dissoleucus nigrirostris Schmidt, 1955

Nota bene: A trinomial authority in parentheses indicates that the subspecies was originally described in a genus other than Micrurus.

== Etymology ==
The subspecific name, dunni, is in honor of American herpetologist Emmett Reid Dunn.
