= Micrurus meridensis =

Conservation status
- Endangered (IUCN 3.1)

Scientific classification
- Kingdom: Animalia
- Phylum: Chordata
- Class: Reptilia
- Order: Squamata
- Suborder: Serpentes
- Family: Elapidae
- Genus: Micrurus
- Species: M. meridensis

Binomial name
- Micrurus meridensis Roze, 1989
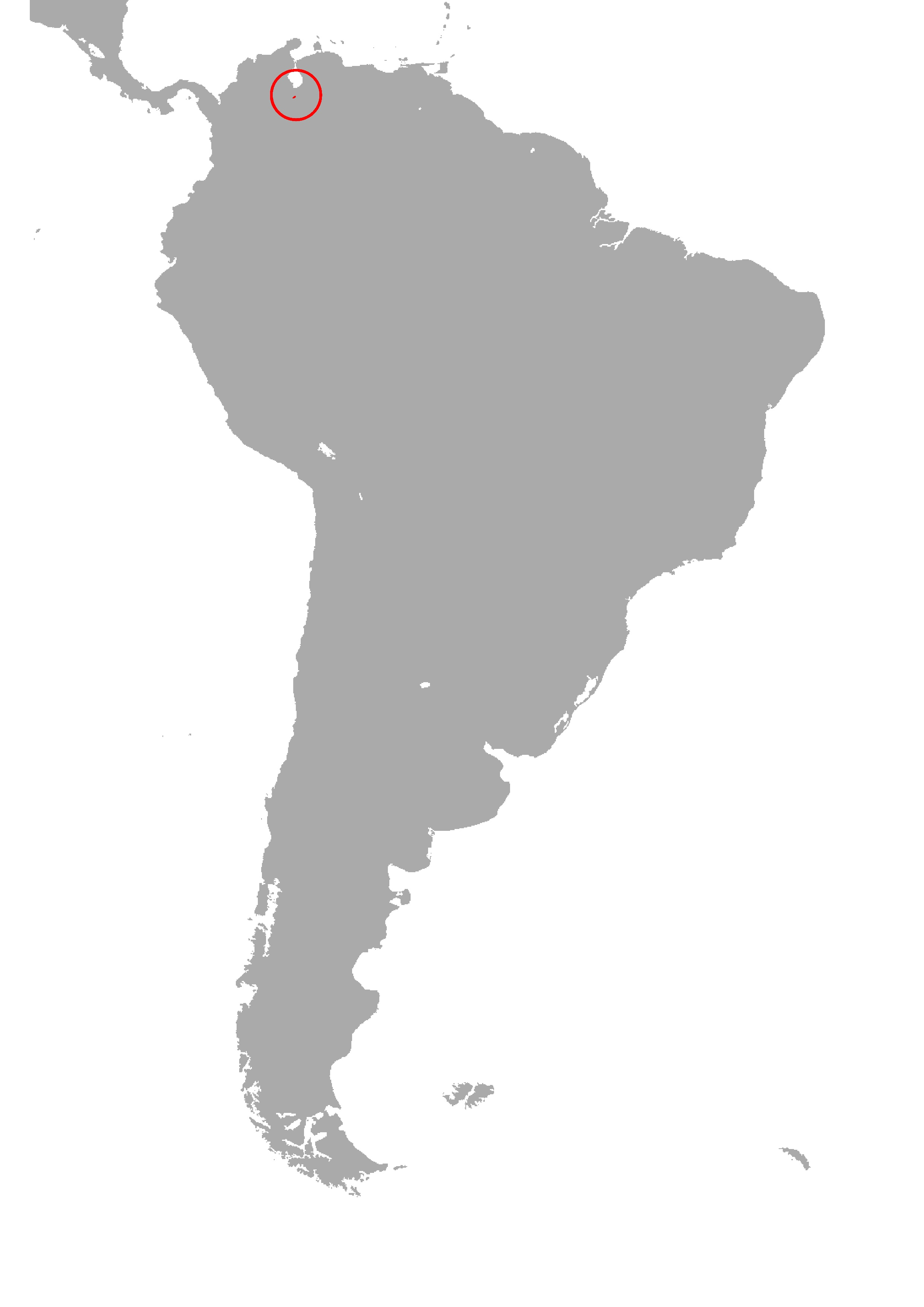
- Geographic distribution of Micrurus meridensis

Synonyms
- Micrurus dissoleucus meridensis Roze, 1989

Species of snake

Micrurus meridensis, also known commonly as the Merida coral snake, the Merida pygmy coral snake, and la candelilla merideña in Venezuelan Spanish, is a species of venomous snake in the family Elapidae. The species is endemic to Venezuela.

== Description ==
Small for its genus, Micrurus meridensis may attain a total length (tail included) of 39 cm (15 in).

Like many coral snakes, its color pattern consists of a combination of red, white, and black rings, with the black rings arranged in triads, in which the black rings are separated from each other by narrow white rings. The triads alternate with red rings, within which some of the dorsal scales have small black tips. Unusual for triadal coral snakes, the outer black rings of the triads are irregular, being reduced or interrupted. Also, there is an unusually high number of triads on the body, the adult male holotype having 18.

== Geographic distribution ==
Micrurus meridensis is found in the Cordillera de Mérida, in the western Venezuelan state of Mérida.

== Habitat ==
The preferred natural habitat of Micrurus meridensis is shrubland, at elevations around 900 m (3,000 ft).

== Behavior ==
Micrurus meridensis is terrestrial.

== Reproduction ==
Micrurus meridensis is oviparous.
