= Micrurus frontifasciatus =

Scientific classification
- Kingdom: Animalia
- Phylum: Chordata
- Class: Reptilia
- Order: Squamata
- Suborder: Serpentes
- Family: Elapidae
- Genus: Micrurus
- Species: M. frontifasciatus

Binomial name
- Micrurus frontifasciatus (F. Werner, 1927)

Synonyms
- Elaps frontifasciatus F. Werner, 1927; Micrurus lemniscatus frontifasciatus (F. Werner, 1927)

Species of snake

Micrurus frontifasciatus, also known commonly as the Bolivian triad coral snake and coral tricolor boliviana in South American Spanish, is a species of venomous snake in the family Elapidae. The species is native to South America.

== Description ==
Micrurus frontifasciatus is a medium to long species of coral snake. The longest measured specimen is the holotype, which has a total length (tail included) of 104 cm (41 in). Its coloration consists of red, white, and black rings, in a triad pattern in common with many coral snakes.

== Geographic distribution ==
Micrurus frontifasciatus is found in Bolivia and Peru, at elevations of 500–2,840 m (1,640–9,320 ft).

== Reproduction ==
Micrurus frontifasciatus is oviparous.
