= Micrurus spurrelli =

Conservation status
- Near Threatened (IUCN 3.1)

Scientific classification
- Kingdom: Animalia
- Phylum: Chordata
- Class: Reptilia
- Order: Squamata
- Suborder: Serpentes
- Family: Elapidae
- Genus: Micrurus
- Species: M. spurrelli

Binomial name
- Micrurus spurrelli (Boulenger, 1914)
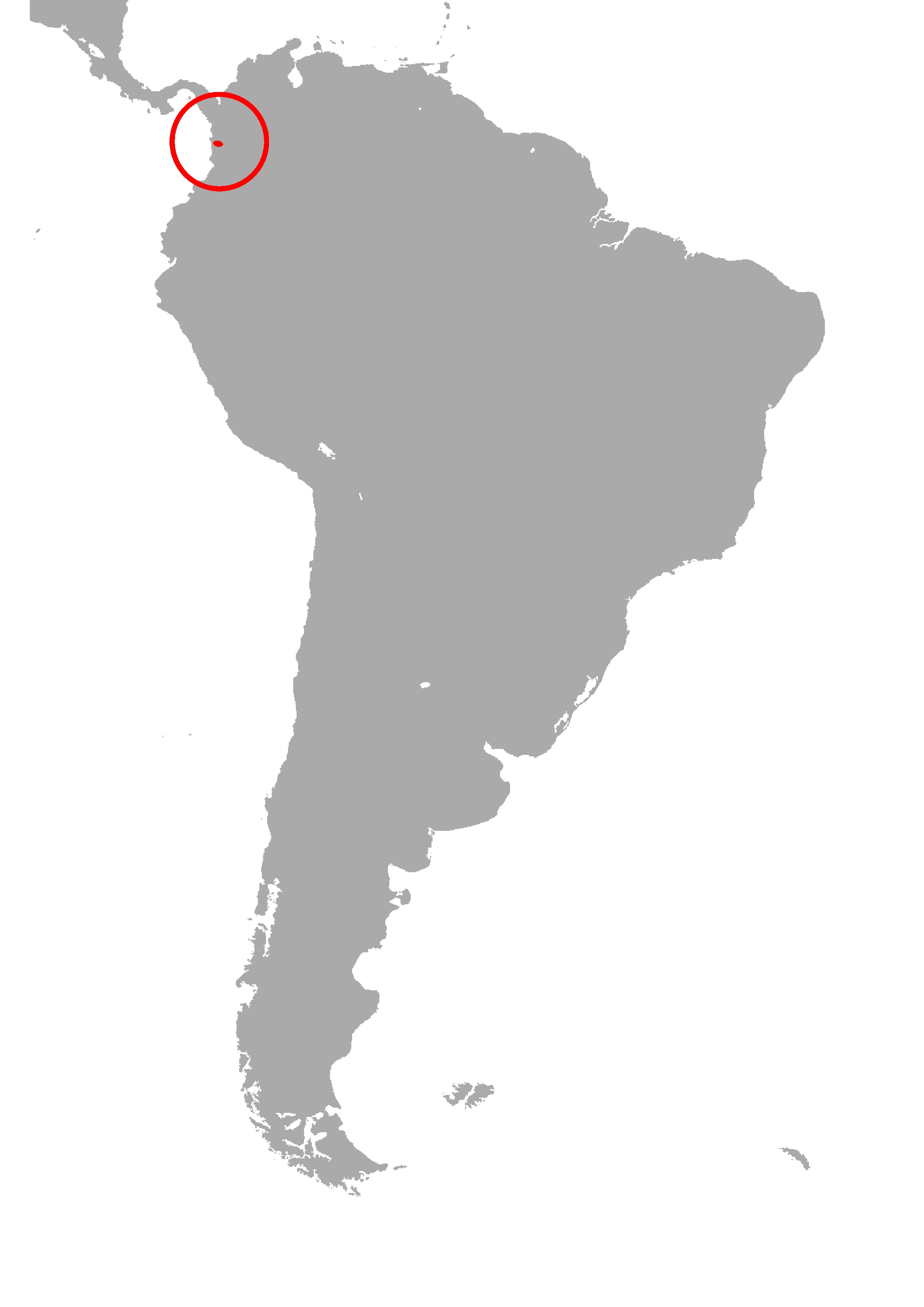

Synonyms
- Elaps spurrelli Boulenger, 1914; Micrurus nicefori Schmidt, 1955

Species of snake

Micrurus spurrelli, also known commonly as the butterfly-head coral snake, the Colombian coral snake, and coral cabeza mariposa in South American Spanish, is a species of venomous snake in the family Elapidae. The species is endemic to Colombia.

== Etymology ==
The specific name, spurrelli, is in honor of British zoologist Herbert George Flaxman Spurrell, who collected the holotype.

The specific name of a synonym, nicefori, is in honor of Brother Nicéforo María, who was both a priest and a herpetologist in Colombia.

== Description ==
Small for the genus Micrurus, adults of Micrurus spurrelli usually have a total length (tail included) of around 40 cm (16 in). The maximum recorded total length is 63 cm (25 in).

The color pattern of M. spurrelli consists of alternating black rings and light-colored rings. Because this species is known from only a few preserved museum specimens, and because red and yellow pigments fade rapidly in alcohol, the actual color in life of the light-colored rings is unknown. The black rings are 3–4 dorsals and 2–4 ventrals wide, and the light-colored rings are 2 dorsals and 2–3 ventrals wide. There are 47–53 black rings on the body. On the top of the head, there is a black crossband, with sinuous anterior and posterior borders, which resembles a butterfly.

Males have 234–241 ventrals and 35–37 subcaudals, and females have 252–267 ventrals and 26–30 subcaudals.

== Geographic distribution ==
Micrurus spurrelli is found in western Colombia, in Chocó Department.

== Habitat ==
The preferred natural habitat of Micrurus spurrelli is forest, at elevations of 100–400 m (330–1,310 ft).

== Behavior ==
Micrurus spurrelli is terrestrial.

== Reproduction ==
Micrurus spurrelli is oviparous.
