= Micrurus carvalhoi =

Scientific classification
- Kingdom: Animalia
- Phylum: Chordata
- Class: Reptilia
- Order: Squamata
- Suborder: Serpentes
- Family: Elapidae
- Genus: Micrurus
- Species: M. carvalhoi

Binomial name
- Micrurus carvalhoi Roze, 1967

Synonyms
- Micrurus lemniscatus carvalhoi Roze, 1967

Species of snake

Micrurus carvalhoi, also known commonly as the Brazilian ribbon coral snake, cobra coral de faixas brasileira in Portuguese, and coral acintada brasilera in Spanish, is a species of venomous snake in the family Elapidae. The species is native to eastern South America.

== Etymology ==
The specific name, carvalhoi, is in honor of Brazilian herpetologist Antenor Leitão de Carvalho.

== Geographic distribution ==
Micrurus carvalhoi is found in Argentina, Brazil, and Paraguay.

== Habitat ==
The preferred natural habitats of Micrurus carvalhoi are forest and cerrado savanna.

== Diet ==
Micrurus carvlhoi is known to prey upon fishes such as Synbranchus marmoratus and species of the genus Gymnotus, amphisbaenians such as Amphisbaena roberti, and snakes such as Dipsas mikanii.

== Reproduction ==
Micrurus carvalhoi is oviparous.
