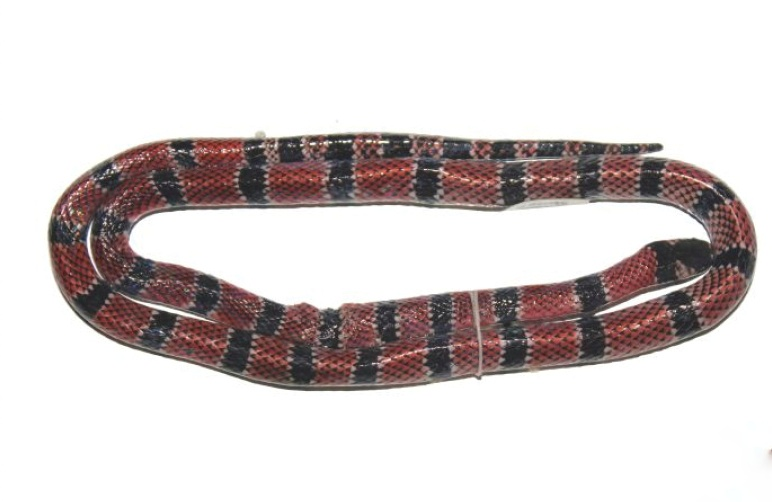
- Preserved museum specimen

Conservation status
- Least Concern (IUCN 3.1)

Scientific classification
- Kingdom: Animalia
- Phylum: Chordata
- Class: Reptilia
- Order: Squamata
- Suborder: Serpentes
- Family: Elapidae
- Genus: Micrurus
- Species: M. remotus

Binomial name
- Micrurus remotus Roze, 1987
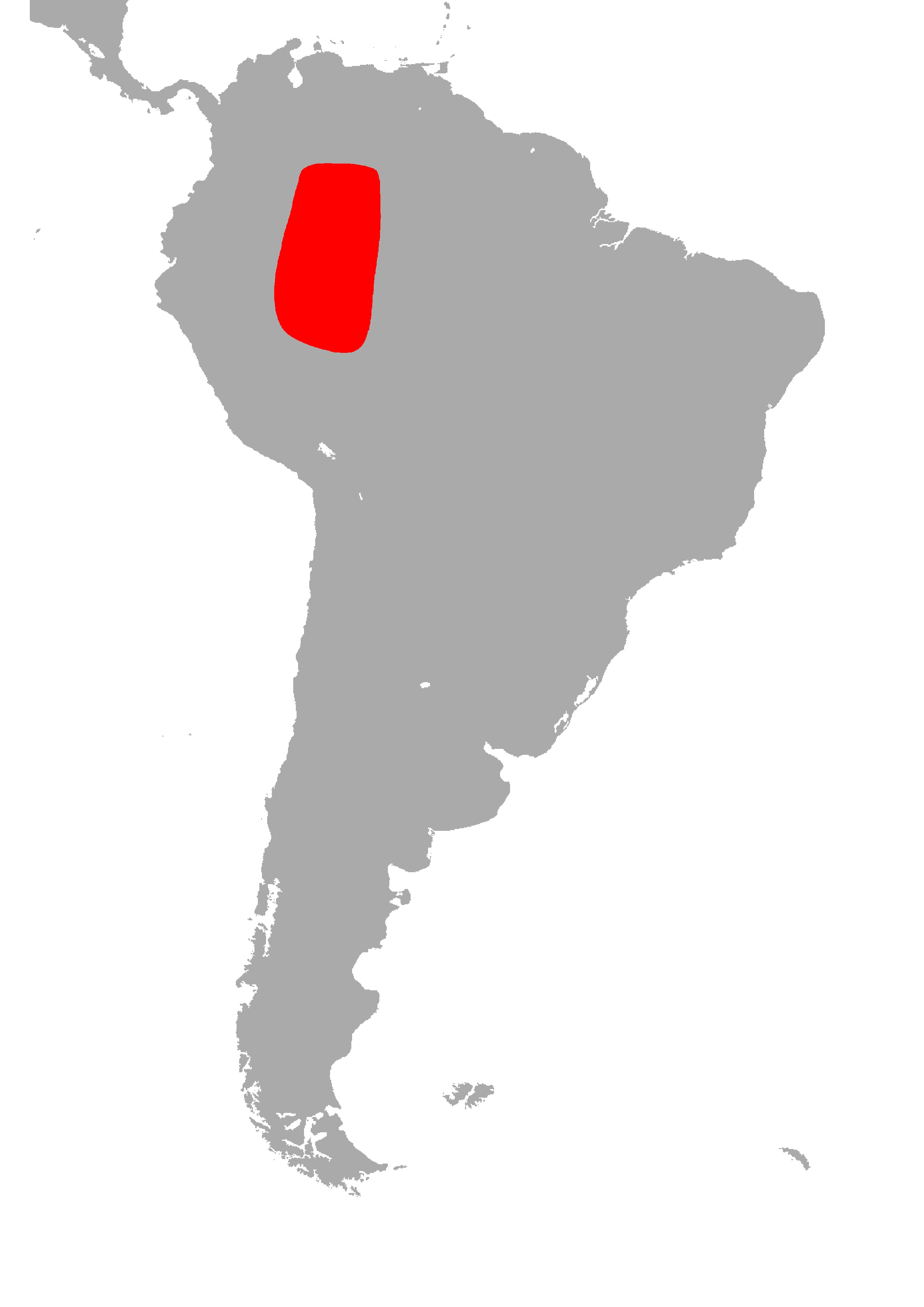

Synonyms
- Micrurus psyches remotus Roze, 1987

= Micrurus remotus =

Species of snake

Micrurus remotus, also known commonly as the remote coral snake, is a species of venomous snake in the family Elapidae. The species is native to northwestern South America.

== Description ==
Like many other species of New World coral snakes, the color pattern of Micrurus remotus consists of red, white (or yellowish-white), and black rings, with the black rings not arranged in triads. The black rings are 2–3 dorsals and ventrals long. Males have 25–29 black rings on the body, and females have 29–40. The white rings are one scale wide. The width of the red rings is inversely proportional to the number of black rings.

Males have 202–203 ventrals and 42–49 subcaudals, and lack supraanal tubercles. Females have 214–225 ventrals and 32–37 subcaudals.

== Geographic distribution ==
Micrurus remotus is found in extreme western Brazil, southeastern Colombia, and southern Venezuela.

== Habitat ==
The preferred natural habitat of Micrurus remotus is forest, at elevations of 90–1,700 m (300–5,580 ft).

== Behavior ==
Micrurus remotus is terrestrial, sheltering under logs and rocks.

== Diet ==
Micrurus remotus preys on lizards and snakes.

== Reproduction ==
Micrurus remotus is oviparous.
