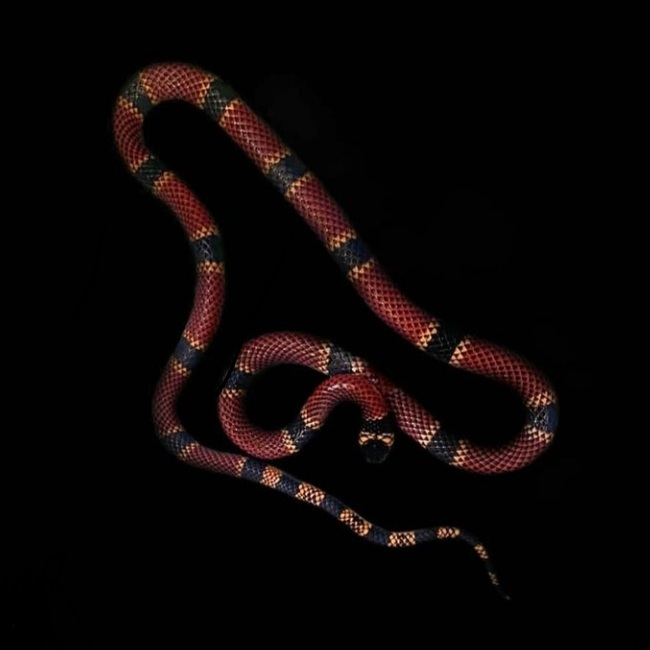

Conservation status
- Least Concern (IUCN 3.1)

Scientific classification
- Kingdom: Animalia
- Phylum: Chordata
- Class: Reptilia
- Order: Squamata
- Suborder: Serpentes
- Family: Elapidae
- Genus: Micrurus
- Species: M. clarki

Binomial name
- Micrurus clarki Schmidt, 1936
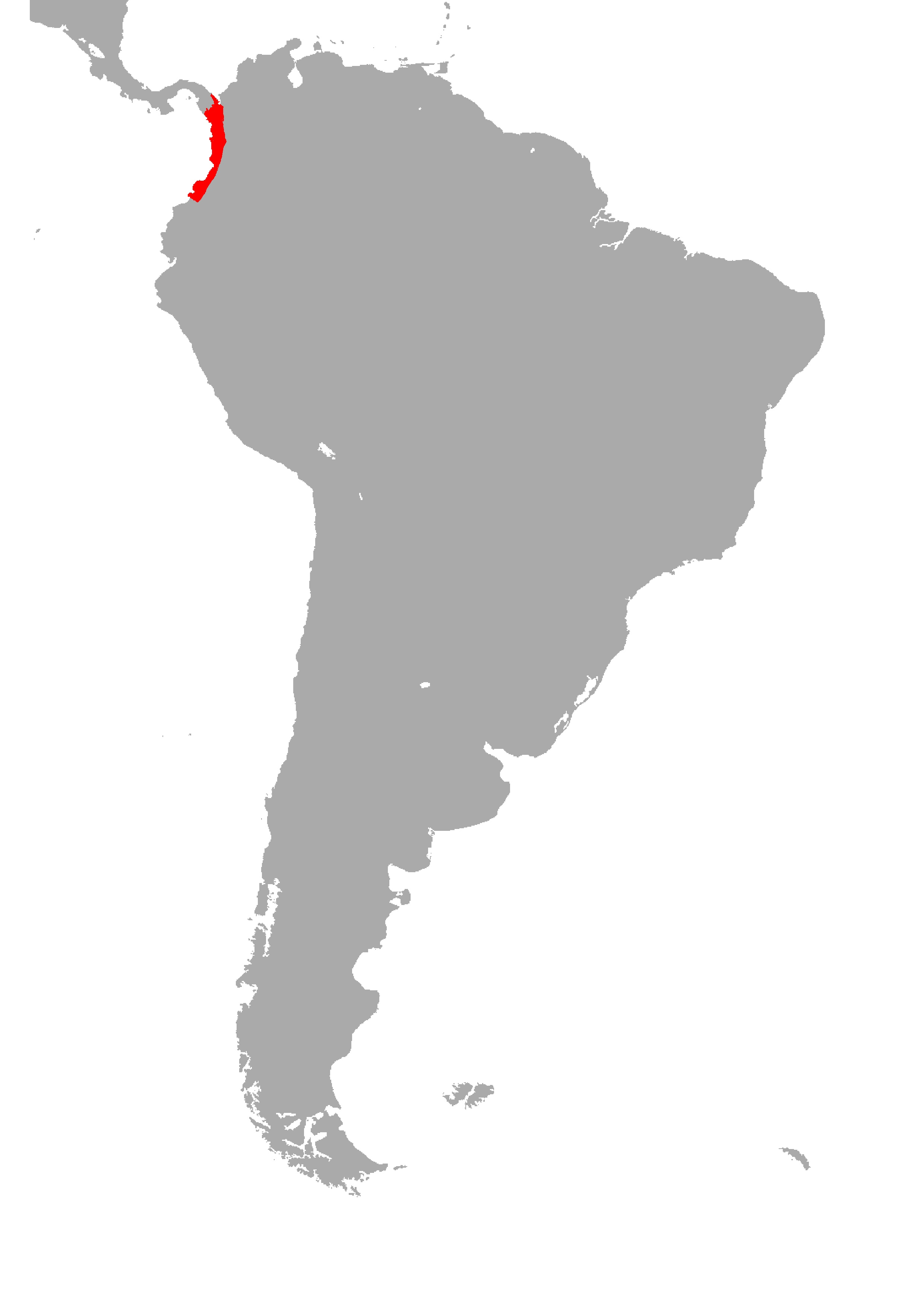

= Micrurus clarki =

Species of snake

Micrurus clarki, also known commonly as Clark's coral snake and coral de Clark in Spanish, is a species of venomous snake in the family Elapidae. The species is native to Central America and northwestern South America.

== Etymology ==
The specific name, clarki, is in honor of Dr. Herbert Charles Clark (1877–1960), who was Director of Laboratories and Preventive Medicine for United Fruit Company, and then was Director of Gorgas Memorial Laboratory (1929–1954), in Panama.

== Geographic range ==
Micrurus clarki is found in western Colombia (Valle del Cauca Department), Panama (Darién Gap), and southeastern Costa Rica.

== Habitat ==
The preferred natural habitat of Micrurus clarki is forest, at altitudes of 2–900 m (6.6–2,952.8 ft). It favors lowland rainforest and premontane wet forests but can also be found in transitional areas between wet and dry tropical forests.

== Behavior ==
Micrurus clarki is fossorial and nocturnal. Its diet mainly consist of other snakes and amphibians.

== Reproduction ==
Micrurus clarki is oviparous.
