= Micrurus tricolor =

Conservation status
- Least Concern (IUCN 3.1)

Scientific classification
- Kingdom: Animalia
- Phylum: Chordata
- Class: Reptilia
- Order: Squamata
- Suborder: Serpentes
- Family: Elapidae
- Genus: Micrurus
- Species: M. tricolor

Binomial name
- Micrurus tricolor Hoge, 1956
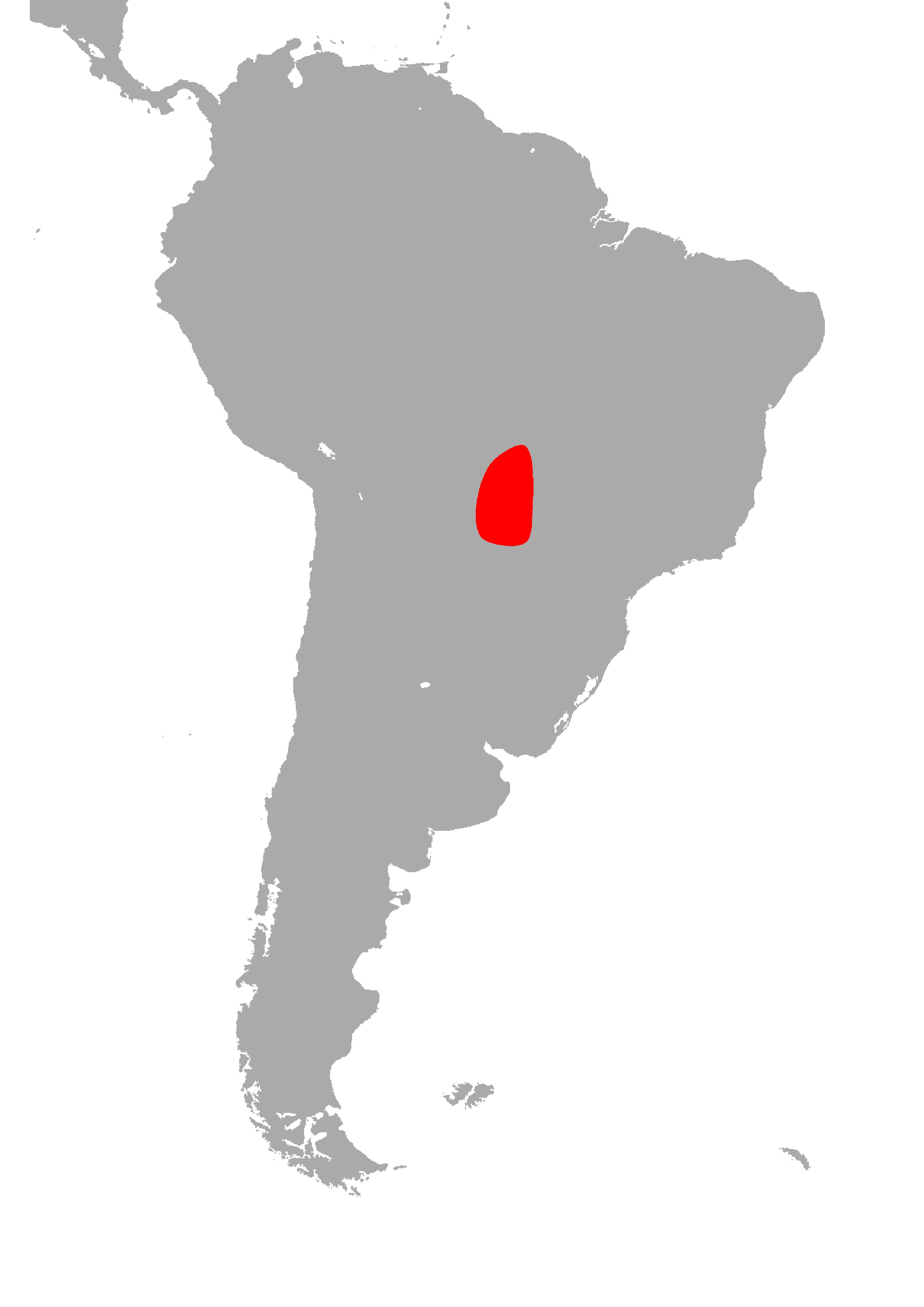

Synonyms
- Micrurus frontalis tricolor Hoge, 1956; Micrurus pyrrhocryptus tricolor Hoge, 1956

Species of snake

Micrurus tricolor, also known commonly as the Pantanal coral snake, coral de Pantanal in South American Spanish, and cobra coral do Pantanal in Brazilian Portuguese, is a species of venomous snake in the family Elapidae. The species is native to central South America.

== Description ==
Large for its genus, Micrurus tricolor may attain a total length (tail included) of more than one meter (3.3 feet).

Like many other New World coral snakes, the color pattern of Micrurus tricolor consists of red, white, and black rings, with the black rings arranged in triads. The dorsal surface of the head is black, with each of the head shields outlined in white. This is followed by a red nuchal collar 5–9 dorsal scales wide, and then the first triad. The central black ring of each triad is wider than the outer black rings, but less than twice as wide. The white rings of the triads are 3–5 dorsals wide. There are 6–14 triads on the body. The dorsal scales that are included in the red and white rings are tipped with black, more so in the red rings than in the white rings. The white rings may be immaculate, especially on the anterior part of the body.

Males have 217–229 ventrals and 25–30 subcaudals, and females have 218–232 ventrals and 20–29 subcaudals.

== Geographic distribution ==
Micrurus tricolor is found in western Brazil (Mato Grosso) and adjacent northern Paraguay.

== Habitat ==
The preferred natural habitats of Micrurus tricolor are savanna, shrubland, and seasonal freshwater wetlands, at elevations of 100–500 m (330–1,640 ft).

== Behavior ==
Micrurus tricolor is terrestrial.

== Reproduction ==
Micrurus tricolor is oviparous.

== Mimicry ==
The color pattern of Micrurus tricolor is mimicked by Xenodon pulcher.
