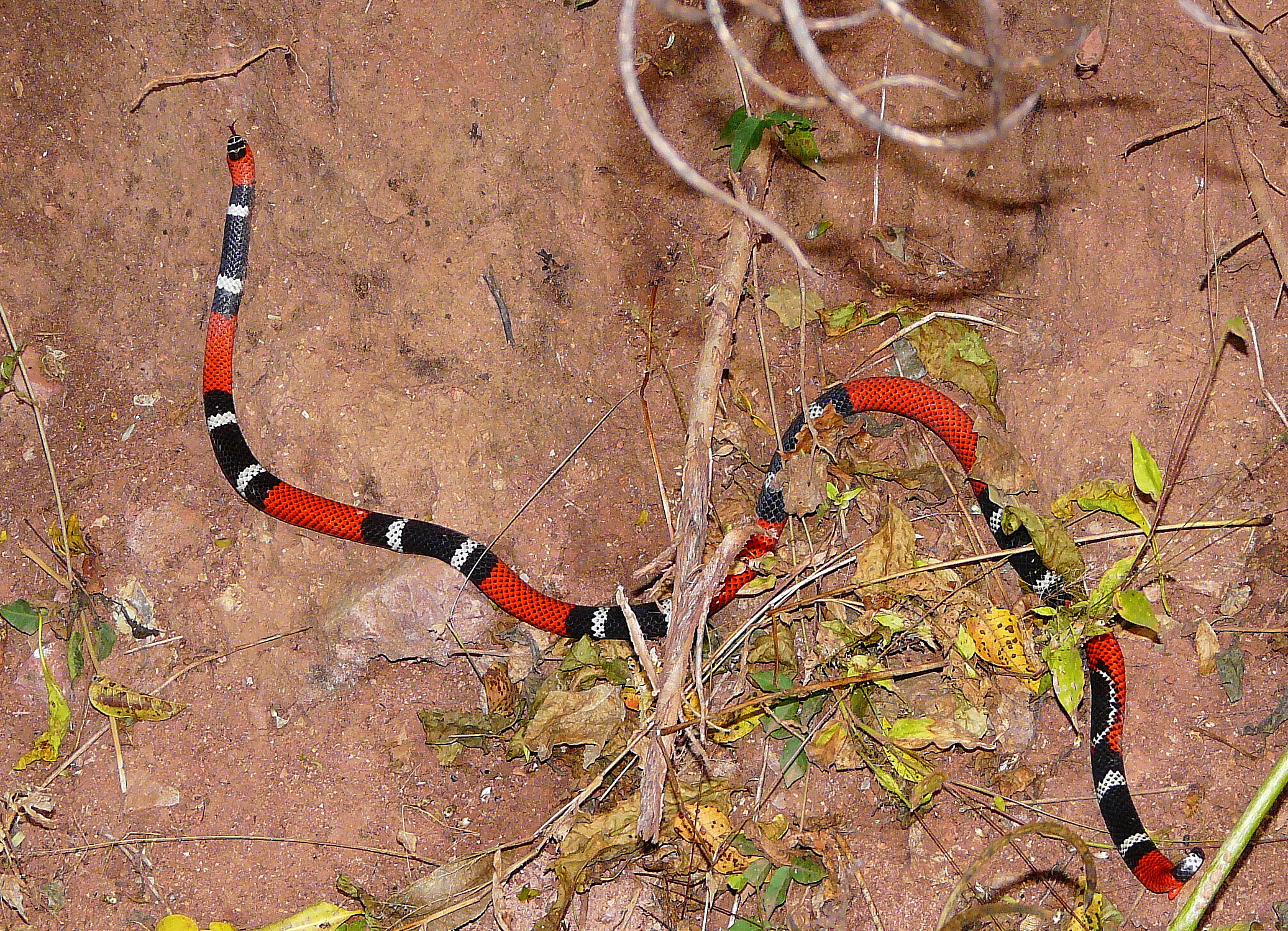
- Micrurus pyrrhocryptus

Conservation status
- Least Concern (IUCN 3.1)

Scientific classification
- Kingdom: Animalia
- Phylum: Chordata
- Class: Reptilia
- Order: Squamata
- Suborder: Serpentes
- Family: Elapidae
- Genus: Micrurus
- Species: M. pyrrhocryptus

Binomial name
- Micrurus pyrrhocryptus (Cope, 1862)
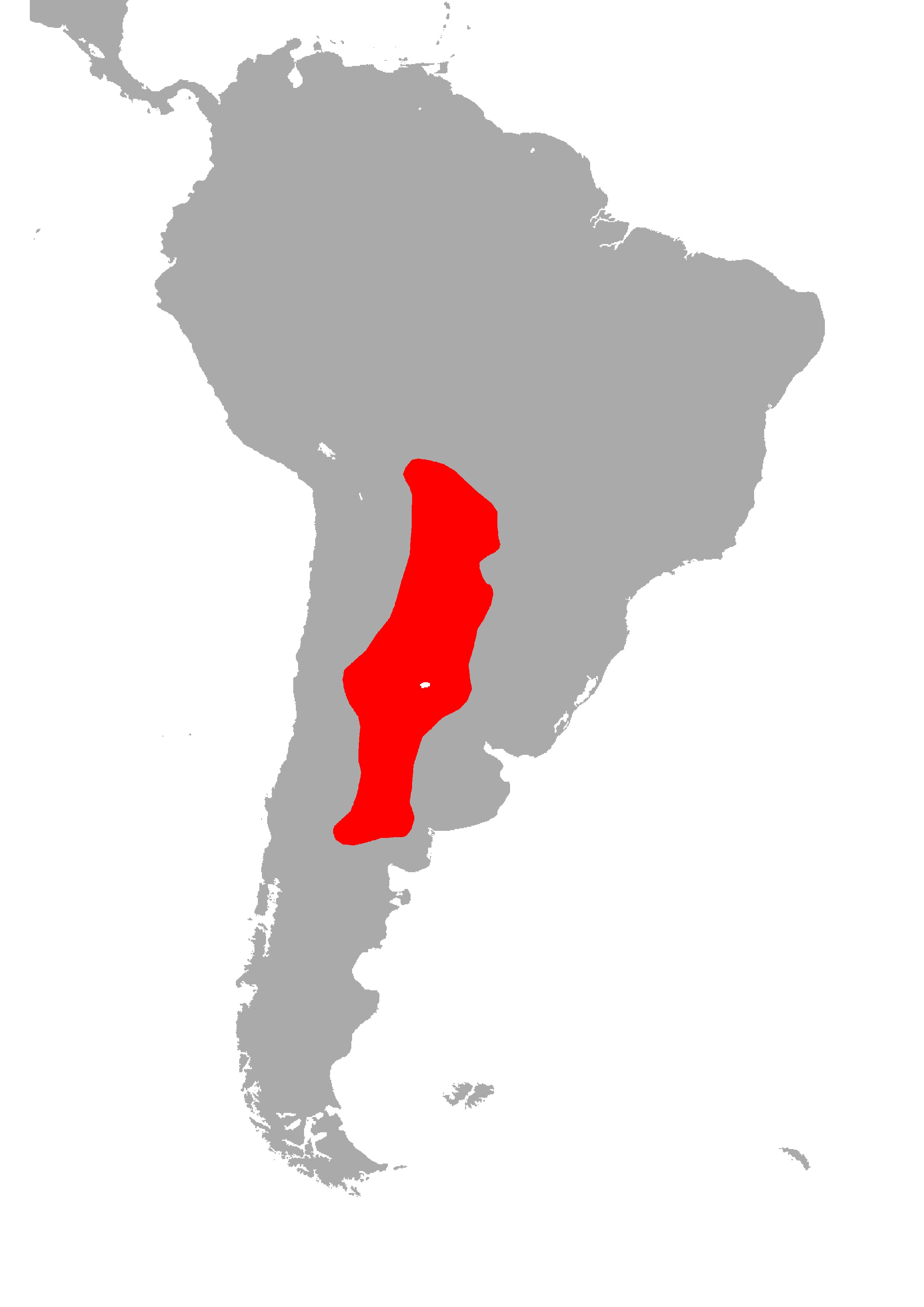

Synonyms
- Elaps pyrrhocryptus Cope, 1862; Micrurus frontalis pyrrhocryptus (Cope, 1862); Elaps simonsii Boulenger, 1902

= Argentinian coral snake =

Species of snake

The Argentinian coral snake (Micrurus pyrrhocryptus) is a species of venomous snake in the family Elapidae. The species is native to central South America, particularly the Dry Chaco region.

== Description ==
Large for the genus Micrurus, an adult of Micrurus pyrrhocryptus usually has a total length (tail included) of 70–90 cm (28–35 in). The maximum recorded total length is 1.24 m (4.1 ft).

Like many other New World coral snakes, the color pattern consists of red, white, and black rings, with the black rings arranged in triads. The central ring of each black triad is 17–35 dorsal scales wide, and is usually wider than the outer black rings of the triad. There are 5–9 triads on the body. The red rings are 13–60 dorsal scales wide, the width varying inversely with the number of triads. The white rings are three dorsal scales wide, and these dorsal scales have black tips.

There does not appear to be sexual dimorphism in scalation in this species, which is unusual for its genus. Males have 214–238 ventrals and 25–30 subcaudals, and females have 216–238 ventrals and 23–29 subcaudals.

== Geographic distribution ==
Micrurus pyrrhocryptus is found in northern Argentina, southeastern Bolivia, extreme southwestern Brazil, and western Paraguay.

== Habitat ==
Micrurus pyrrhocryptus occurs in a variety of semiarid habitats including forest, savanna, shrubland, and grassland, at elevations of 100–500 m (330–1,640 ft).

== Behavior ==
Micrurus pyrrhocryptus is terrestrial.

== Diet ==
Micrurus pyrrhocryptus preys on amphisbaenians and snakes, including its own species.

== Reproduction ==
Micrurus pyrrhocryptus is oviparous.

== Venom ==
Micrurus pyrrhocryptus possesses a powerful venom. The estimated lethal dose for an adult human is 8–10 mg (dry weight). When specimens were "milked" of their venom, the average venom yield was 8 mg. However, the maximum venom yield was 80 mg, which is eight to ten times the estimated lethal dose.
