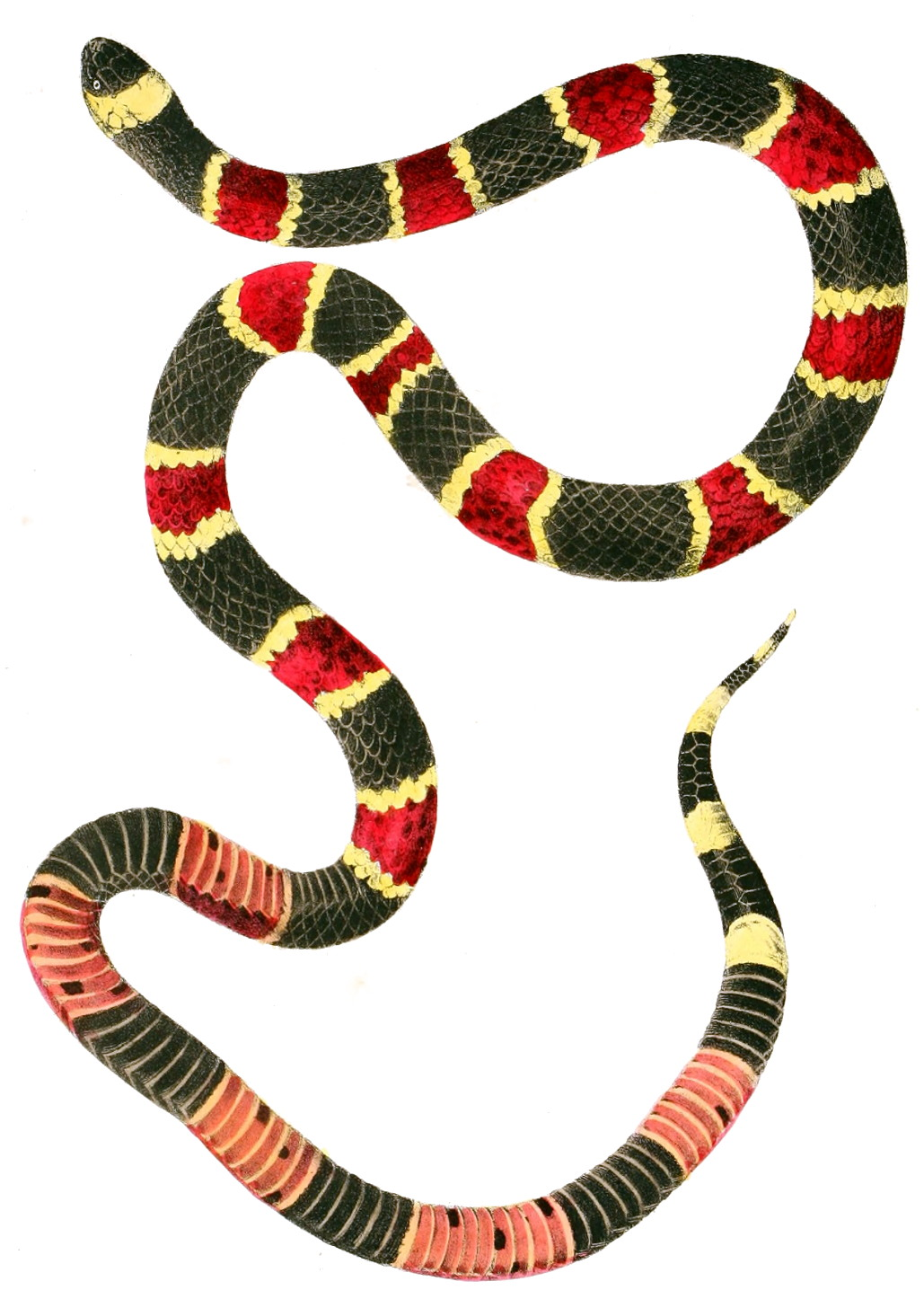
- Micrurus fulvius

Scientific classification
- Kingdom: Animalia
- Phylum: Chordata
- Class: Reptilia
- Order: Squamata
- Suborder: Serpentes
- Family: Elapidae
- Genus: Micrurus; Wagler, 1824

Type species
- Coluber fulvius Linnaeus, 1766

= Micrurus =

Genus of reptiles

Micrurus is a genus of venomous coral snakes of the family Elapidae.

== Geographic range ==
Species in the genus Micrurus are endemic to the Americas.

== Species ==
The following 86 species are recognized as being valid.

- Micrurus albicinctus Amaral, 1925 – white-banded coral snake
- Micrurus alleni K. Schmidt, 1936 – arrow-headed coral snake, Allen's coral snake
- Micrurus altirostris (Cope, 1860) – Uruguayan coral snake
- Micrurus ancoralis (Jan, 1872) – regal coral snake, anchor coral snake
- Micrurus anibal L. Nascimento, Graboski, Silva Jr. & Prudente, 2024
- Micrurus annellatus (W. Peters, 1871) – annellated coral snake
- Micrurus averyi K. Schmidt, 1939 – Avery's coral snake, black-headed coral snake
- Micrurus baliocoryphus (Cope, 1860) – mesopotamian coral snake
- Micrurus bocourti (Jan, 1872) – false triad coral snake, Ecuador coral snake
- Micrurus bogerti Roze, 1967 – Bogert's coral snake
- Micrurus boicora Bernarde, Turci, Abegg & Franco, 2018 – boicora coral snake
- Micrurus bonita L. Nascimento, Graboski, Silva Jr. & Prudente, 2024
- Micrurus brasiliensis Roze, 1967 – Brazilian short-tailed coral snake
- Micrurus browni K. Schmidt & H.M. Smith, 1943 – Brown's coral snake
- Micrurus camilae Renjifo & Lundberg, 2003
- Micrurus carvalhoi Roze, 1967 – Brazilian ribbon coral snake
- Micrurus circinalis (A.M.C. Duméril, Bibron & A.H.A. Duméril, 1854) – Trinidad coral snake, Trinidad northern coral snake
- Micrurus clarki K. Schmidt, 1936 – Clark's coral snake
- Micrurus collaris (Schlegel, 1837) – Guyana blackback coral snake
- Micrurus corallinus (Merrem, 1820) – painted coral snake
- Micrurus decoratus (Jan, 1858) – Brazilian coral snake
- Micrurus diana Roze, 1983 – Diana's coral snake
- Micrurus diastema (A.M.C. Duméril, Bibron & A.H.A. Duméril, 1854) – variable coral snake
- Micrurus dissoleucus (Cope, 1860) – pygmy coral snake
- Micrurus distans (Kennicott, 1860) – clear-banded coral snake, West Mexican coral snake
- Micrurus diutius Burger, 1955 – Trinidad ribbon coral snake
- Micrurus dumerilii (Jan, 1858) – Capuchin coral snake
- Micrurus elegans (Jan, 1858) – elegant coral snake
- Micrurus ephippifer (Cope, 1886) – Oaxacan coral snake
- Micrurus filiformis (Günther, 1859) – thread coral snake, slender coral snake
- Micrurus frontalis (A.M.C. Duméril, Bibron & A.H.A. Duméril, 1854) – southern coral snake, short-tailed coral snake
- Micrurus frontifasciatus (F. Werner, 1927) – Bolivian triad coral snake
- Micrurus fulvius (Linnaeus, 1766) – eastern coral snake, common coral snake, American cobra
- †Micrurus gallicus Rage & Holman, 1984
- Micrurus helleri K. Schmidt & F. Schmidt, 1925 – western ribbon coral snake
- Micrurus hemprichii (Jan, 1858) – Hemprich's coral snake
- Micrurus hippocrepis (W. Peters, 1862) – Mayan coral snake
- Micrurus ibiboboca (Merrem, 1820) – Caatinga coral snake
- Micrurus isozonus (Cope, 1860) – equal-banded coral snake, Venezuela coral snake, Sandner's coral snake
- Micrurus janisrozei L. Nascimento, Graboski, Silva Jr. & Prudente, 2024
- Micrurus langsdorffi (Wagler, 1824) – confused coral snake, Langsdorff's coral snake
- Micrurus laticollaris (W. Peters, 1870) – double collar coral snake
- Micrurus latifasciatus K. Schmidt, 1933 – long-banded coral snake, broad-ringed coral snake
- Micrurus lemniscatus (Linnaeus, 1758) – South American coral snake
- Micrurus limbatus Fraser, 1964 – Tuxtlan coral snake
- Micrurus margaritiferus Roze, 1967 – speckled coral snake
- Micrurus medemi Roze, 1967 – Villavicencio coral snake
- Micrurus meridensis Roze, 1989 – Mérida coral snake
- Micrurus mertensi K. Schmidt, 1936 – Mertens's coral snake, Peruvian desert coral snake
- Micrurus michoacanensis (Dugès, 1891)
- Micrurus mipartitus (A.M.C. Duméril, Bibron & A.H.A. Duméril, 1854) – red-tailed coral snake, many-banded coral snake
- Micrurus mosquitensis K. Schmidt, 1933 – mosquito coral snake
- Micrurus multifasciatus (Jan, 1858) – many-banded coral snake
- Micrurus multiscutatus Rendahl & Vestergren, 1940 – Cauca coral snake
- Micrurus narduccii (Jan, 1863) – Andean blackback coral snake
- Micrurus nattereri K. Schmidt, 1952 – Natterer's coral snake, Venezuelan aquatic coral snake
- Micrurus nebularis Roze, 1989 – Neblina coral snake, cloud forest coral snake
- Micrurus nigrocinctus (Girard, 1854) – Central American coral snake
- Micrurus obscurus (Jan, 1872) – black-neck Amazonian coral snake, Bolivian coral snake
- Micrurus oligoanellatus Ayerbe & López, 2002 – Tambito's coral snake
- Micrurus oliveri Roze, 1967
- Micrurus ornatissimus (Jan, 1858) – ornate coral snake
- Micrurus pacaraimae Morato de Carvalho, 2002 – Pacaraima coral snake
- Micrurus pachecogili Campbell, 2000 – Pueblan coral snake
- Micrurus paraensis da Cunha & F. Nascimento, 1973 – Para coral snake
- Micrurus peruvianus K. Schmidt, 1936 – Peru coral snake
- Micrurus petersi Roze, 1967 – mountain coral snake, Peters's coral snake
- Micrurus potyguara Pires, Silva Jr., Feitosa, Prudente, Pereira Filho & Zaher, 2014 – Potyguara coral snake
- Micrurus proximans H.M. Smith & Chrapliwy, 1958 – Nayarit coral snake
- Micrurus psyches (Daudin, 1803) – northern coral snake, Carib coral snake
- Micrurus putumayensis Lancini, 1962 – Putumayo coral snake
- Micrurus pyrrhocryptus (Cope, 1862) – Argentinian coral snake
- Micrurus remotus Roze, 1987 – remote coral snake
- Micrurus renjifoi (Lamar, 2003) – Renjifo's coral snake
- Micrurus ruatanus (Günther, 1895) – Roatan coral snake
- Micrurus sangilensis Nicéforo Maria, 1942 – San Gil coral snake, Santander coral snake
- Micrurus scutiventris (Cope, 1869) – little black coral snake, pygmy black-backed coral snake
- Micrurus serranus Harvey, Aparicio & Gonzáles, 2003
- Micrurus silviae Di-Bernardo, Borges-Martins & Silva Jr., 2007
- Micrurus spixii Wagler, 1824 – Amazon coral snake
- Micrurus spurrelli (Boulenger, 1914) – butterfly-head coral snake
- Micrurus steindachneri (F. Werner, 1901) – piedmont coral snake, Steindachner's coral snake
- Micrurus stewarti Barbour & Amaral, 1928 – Panamanian coral snake
- Micrurus stuarti Roze, 1967 – Stuart's coral snake
- Micrurus surinamensis (Cuvier, 1817) – aquatic coral snake
- Micrurus tener (Baird & Girard, 1853) – Texas coral snake
- Micrurus tikuna Feitosa, Silva Jr., Pires, Zaher & Prudente, 2015 – Tikuna coral snake
- Micrurus tricolor (Hoge, 1956) – Pantanal coral snake
- Micrurus tschudii (Jan, 1858) – desert coral snake

Nota bene: A binomial authority in parentheses indicates that the species was originally described in a genus other than Micrurus.

== Reproduction ==
All species of Micrurus are oviparous (egg-laying).
