= Micrurus margaritiferus =

Conservation status
- Least Concern (IUCN 3.1)

Scientific classification
- Kingdom: Animalia
- Phylum: Chordata
- Class: Reptilia
- Order: Squamata
- Suborder: Serpentes
- Family: Elapidae
- Genus: Micrurus
- Species: M. margaritiferus

Binomial name
- Micrurus margaritiferus Roze, 1967
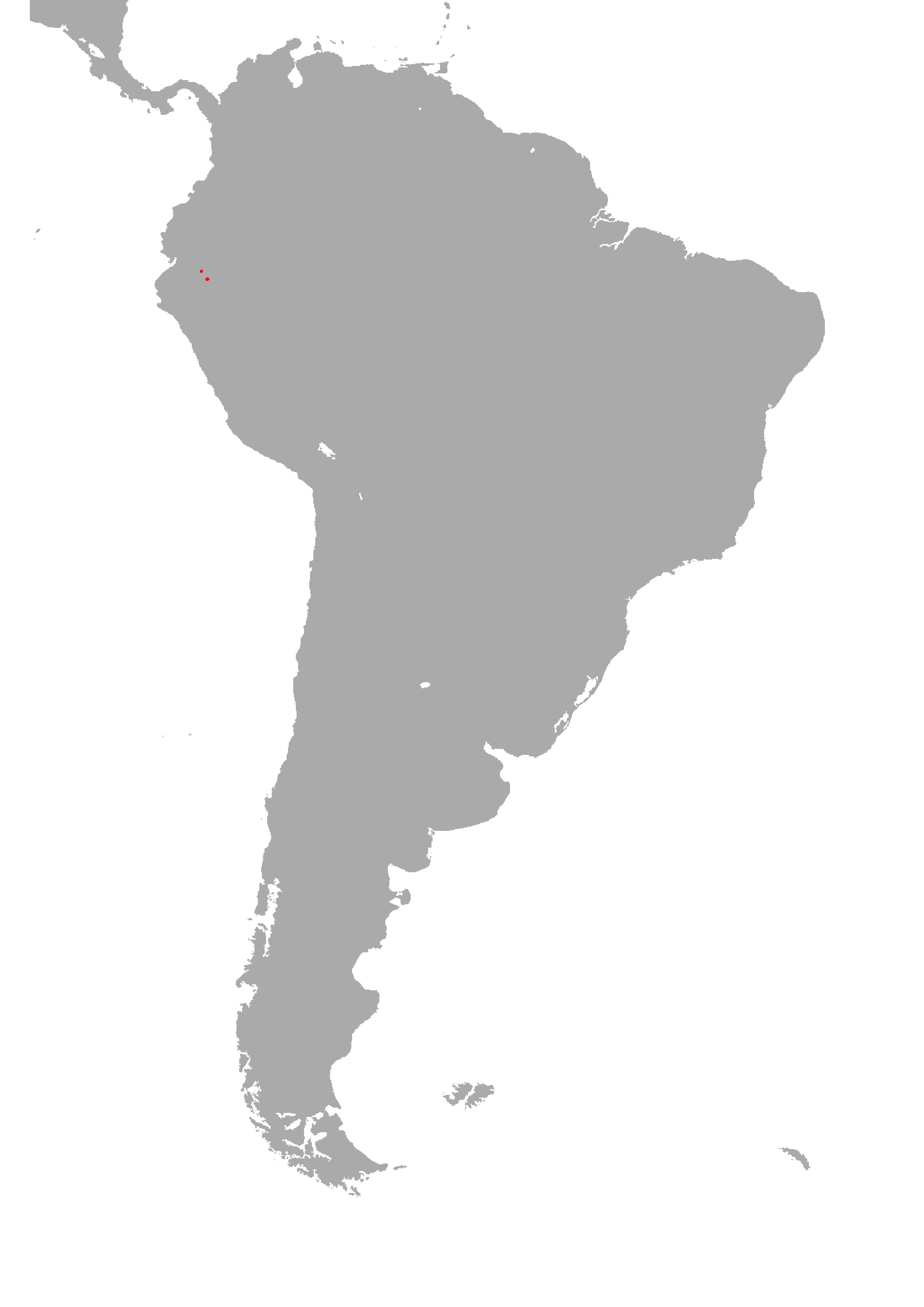

Species of snake

Micrurus margaritiferus, also known commonly as the speckled coral snake and the coral salpicada in Peruvian Spanish, is a species of venomous snake in the family Elapidae. The species is endemic to Peru.

== Description ==
Micrurus margaritiferus is medium-sized for its genus. The maximum reported total length (tail included) is that of a female which measured 73.5 cm (28.9 in).

The color pattern consists of many narrow black rings (68–141), separated by very narrow white rings. Dorsally, the white rings are interrupted, forming transverse series of white dots. Ventrally, the white rings are complete.

== Geographic distribution ==
Micrurus margaritiferus is found in northeastern Peru, on the Amazonian slopes of the Andes, in the Department of Amazonas.

== Habitat ==
The preferred natural habitat of Micrurus margaritiferus is forest, at elevations of 720–1,000 m (2,360–3,280 ft).

== Behavior ==
Micrurus margaritiferus is terrestrial.

== Reproduction ==
Micrurus margeritiferus is oviparous.

== Etymology ==
The specific name, margaritiferus, means "carrier of pearls" is a reference to the white dots of the interrupted rings, which resemble strings of pearls.
