= Ana Lúcia da Costa Prudente =

Brazilian herpetologist (born 1968)

- Born: May 5, 1968 (age 58)
- Education: Federal University of Uberlândia; Pontifical Catholic University of Rio Grande do Sul; Federal University of Paraná; University of São Paulo
- Known for: Research on snakes, biogeography, and Amazon Basin herpetofauna
- Scientific career
- Fields: Herpetology
- Workplaces: Museu Paraense Emílio Goeldi; Federal University of Pará
- Doctoral advisor: Thales de Lema
- Author abbrev. (botany): Prudente

Ana Lúcia da Costa Prudente, cited as Ana L. C. Prudente or A. L. C. Prudente, (born 5 May 1968), is a Brazilian herpetologist who primarily studies snakes.

== Career ==
From March to September 1986, Prudente completed an internship in the environmental education department of the municipal Environmental agency. In the same year, she enrolled at the Federal University of Uberlândia, where she graduated in biosciences in 1989. In 1990, she specialized in systematic zoology. In 1993, under the supervision of Thales de Lema, she earned a master's degree in ecology and evolution from the Pontifical Catholic University of Rio Grande do Sul (PUCRS) with her thesis Revisão Sistemática de Gomesophis brasiliensis com algumas considerções sobre a tribo Tachymenini (Serpentes, Colubridae).

From 1995 to 1998 she was a visiting researcher at the Museu de História Natural Capão da Imbuia, where she supported the curation of the herpetological collection. In 1998, again under de Lema's supervision, she received her PhD in zoology from the Federal University of Paraná with the dissertation Revisão, Filogenia e Alimentação de Siphlophis Fitzinger, 1843 (Serpentes, Colubridae, Xenodontinae). From March to September 1998 she lectured in biology at the Centro de Ensino Supletivo do Estado do Paraná.

From 1998 to 2000, she completed her postdoc at the University of São Paulo, where she worked on the project Phylogenetic Systematics of the Subfamily Dipsadinae. Since 2000, she has been a research associate and curator of the herpetological section at the Museu Paraense Emílio Goeldi (MPEG), which houses a snake collection of about 25,500 specimens.

Since 2001 she has been a supervising professor in the postgraduate program in zoology (Programa de Pós-Graduação em Zoologia, PPGZOOL) at the Federal University of Pará and in the program for biodiversity and evolution (PPGBE) at MPEG. From 2003 to 2006 she participated in the project Evolution of the reptile fauna in southeastern Brazil from the Late Cretaceous to the present: Paleontology, phylogeny, and biogeography at the University of São Paulo. From 2015 to 2018 she served as head of zoological coordination, and from 2016 to 2018 she was deputy coordinator for research and postgraduate studies at MPEG.

Prudente's research focuses on the biogeography of reptiles, particularly snakes, with emphasis on the biological inventory of the herpetofauna of the Amazon Basin, as well as morphology, systematics, and biology.

In 2022, she co-authored the book Guia de cobras da região de Manaus – Amazônia Central.

== Personal life ==
Prudente is the mother of two children.

== Species described with the involvement of Ana Lúcia da Costa Prudente ==
- Amerotyphlops arenensis (Graboski, Pereira Filho, Silva, Prudente & Zaher, 2015)
- Amerotyphlops caetanoi (Graboski, Arredondo, Grazziotin, Guerra-Fuentes, Pereira Filho, Silva, Prudente, Pinto, Rodrigues, Bonatto & Zaher, 2022)
- Amerotyphlops illusorium (Graboski, Arredondo, Grazziotin, Guerra-Fuentes, Pereira Filho, Silva, Prudente, Pinto, Rodrigues, Bonatto & Zaher, 2022)
- Amerotyphlops martis (Graboski, Arredondo, Grazziotin, Guerra-Fuentes, Pereira Filho, Silva, Prudente, Pinto, Rodrigues, Bonatto & Zaher, 2022)
- Amerotyphlops montanum (Graboski, Arredondo, Grazziotin, Guerra-Fuentes, Pereira Filho, Silva, Prudente, Pinto, Rodrigues, Bonatto & Zaher, 2022)
- Atractus aboiporu (Melo-Sampaio, Passos, Fouquet, Prudente & Torres-Carvajal, 2019)
- Atractus akerios (Melo‐Sampaio, Passos, Prudente, Venegas & Torres‐Carvajal, 2021)
- Atractus boimirim (Passos, Prudente & Lynch, 2016)
- Atractus caxiuana (Prudente & Santos-Costa, 2006)
- Atractus dapsilis (Melo-Sampaio, Passos, Fouquet, Prudente & Torres-Carvajal, 2019)
- Atractus hoogmoedi (Prudente & Passos, 2010)
- Atractus natans (Hoogmoed & Prudente, 2003)
- Atractus nawa (Melo‐Sampaio, Passos, Prudente, Venegas & Torres‐Carvajal, 2021)
- Atractus pachacamac (Melo‐Sampaio, Passos, Prudente, Venegas & Torres‐Carvajal, 2021)
- Atractus surucucu (Prudente, 2008)
- Atractus tartarus (Passos, Prudente & J.D. Lynch, 2016)
- Atractus trefauti (Melo-Sampaio, Passos, Fouquet, Prudente & Torres-Carvajal, 2019)
- Atractus ukupacha (Melo‐Sampaio, Passos, Prudente, Venegas & Torres‐Carvajal, 2021)
- Erythrolamprus rochai (Ascenso, Costa & Prudente, 2019)
- Eutrachelophis papilio (Zaher & Prudente, 2019)
- Imantodes guane (Missassi & Prudente, 2015)
- Leptodeira tarairiu (Costa, Graboski, Grazziotin, Zaher, Rodrigues & Prudente, 2022)
- Micrurus anibal (Nascimento, Graboski, Silva-Jr. & Prudente, 2024)
- Micrurus bonita (Nascimento, Graboski, Silva-Jr. & Prudente, 2024)
- Micrurus janisrozei (Nascimento, Graboski, Silva-Jr. & Prudente, 2024)
- Micrurus potyguara (Pires, Da Silva Jr, Feitosa, Prudente, Preira-Filho & Zaher, 2014)
- Micrurus tikuna (Feitosa, Da Silva Jr, Pires, Zaher & Prudente, 2015)
- Pseudoboa serrana (Morato, Moura-Leite, Prudente & Bérnils, 1995)
- Pseudogonatodes quihuai (Rojas-Runjaic, Koch, Castroviejo-Fisher & Prudente, 2024)
