= Ana L. C. Prudente =

Brazilian herpetologist

Ana Lúcia da Costa Prudente
- Born: 5 May 1968 (age 58)
- Education: Federal University of Uberlândia; Pontifical Catholic University of Rio Grande do Sul; Federal University of Paraná; University of São Paulo
- Known for: Research on snakes, reptile systematics, taxonomy and biogeography
- Scientific career
- Fields: Herpetology, zoology
- Workplaces: Museu Paraense Emílio Goeldi
- Doctoral advisor: Thales de Lema

Ana Lúcia da Costa Prudente (born 5 May 1968), also cited as Ana L. C. Prudente or A. L. C. Prudente, is a Brazilian herpetologist whose research focuses primarily on snakes.

== Biography ==
Prudente completed an internship in the municipal environmental education department from March to September 1986. In the same year, she enrolled at the Federal University of Uberlândia, where she received a degree in biological sciences in 1989. In 1990, she specialized in systematic zoology. In 1993, under the supervision of Thales de Lema, she completed a master's degree in ecology and evolution at the Pontifical Catholic University of Rio Grande do Sul, with the thesis Revisão Sistemática de Gomesophis brasiliensis com algumas considerções sobre a tribo Tachymenini (Serpentes, Colubridae). From 1995 to 1998, she was a visiting researcher at the Museu de História Natural Capão da Imbuia, where she assisted with the curation of the herpetological collection. In 1998, again under de Lema's supervision, she received a doctorate in zoology from the Federal University of Paraná for the dissertation Revisão, Filogenia e Alimentação de Siphlophis Fitzinger, 1843 (Serpentes, Colubridae, Xenodontinae). From March to September 1998, she taught biology at the Centro de Ensino Supletivo do Estado do Paraná. From 1998 to 2000, she completed a postdoctoral fellowship at the University of São Paulo, where she carried out a project on the phylogenetic systematics of the subfamily Dipsadinae. Since 2000, she has been a researcher and curator in the herpetology department of the Museu Paraense Emílio Goeldi (MPEG), whose snake collection contains approximately 25,500 specimens.

Since 2001, Prudente has been a supervising professor in the graduate program in zoology (Programa de Pós-Graduação em Zoologia, PPGZOOL) at the Federal University of Pará and in the Biodiversity and Evolution program (PPGBE) at MPEG. From 2003 to 2006, she participated in a project at the University of São Paulo on the evolution of the reptile fauna of southeastern Brazil from the Late Cretaceous to the present, focusing on paleontology, phylogeny and biogeography. From 2015 to 2018, she headed the Zoology Coordination at MPEG, and from 2016 to 2018 she was deputy coordinator for research and postgraduate studies there.

Prudente's research focuses on the biogeography of reptiles, particularly snakes, the biological inventory of the herpetofauna of the Amazon basin, morphology, systematics, taxonomy and biology.

In 2022, she was a co-author of the book Guia de cobras da região de Manaus – Amazônia Central.

Prudente is the mother of two children.

== Taxa described ==
- Amerotyphlops arenensis — Graboski, Pereira Filho, Silva, Prudente & Zaher, 2015
- Amerotyphlops caetanoi — Graboski, Arredondo, Grazziotin, Guerra-Fuentes, Pereira Filho, Silva, Prudente, Pinto, Rodrigues, Bonatto & Zaher, 2022
- Amerotyphlops illusorium — Graboski, Arredondo, Grazziotin, Guerra-Fuentes, Pereira Filho, Silva, Prudente, Pinto, Rodrigues, Bonatto & Zaher, 2022
- Amerotyphlops martis — Graboski, Arredondo, Grazziotin, Guerra-Fuentes, Pereira Filho, Silva, Prudente, Pinto, Rodrigues, Bonatto & Zaher, 2022
- Amerotyphlops montanum — Graboski, Arredondo, Grazziotin, Guerra-Fuentes, Pereira Filho, Silva, Prudente, Pinto, Rodrigues, Bonatto & Zaher, 2022
- Atractus aboiporu — Melo-Sampaio, Passos, Fouquet, Prudente & Torres-Carvajal, 2019
- Atractus akerios — Melo-Sampaio, Passos, Prudente, Venegas & Torres-Carvajal, 2021
- Atractus boimirim — Passos, Prudente & Lynch, 2016
- Atractus caxiuana — Prudente & Santos-Costa, 2006
- Atractus dapsilis — Melo-Sampaio, Passos, Fouquet, Prudente & Torres-Carvajal, 2019
- Atractus hoogmoedi — Prudente & Passos, 2010
- Atractus natans — Hoogmoed & Prudente, 2003
- Atractus nawa — Melo-Sampaio, Passos, Prudente, Venegas & Torres-Carvajal, 2021
- Atractus pachacamac — Melo-Sampaio, Passos, Prudente, Venegas & Torres-Carvajal, 2021
- Atractus surucucu — Prudente, 2008
- Atractus tartarus — Passos, Prudente & J. D. Lynch, 2016
- Atractus trefauti — Melo-Sampaio, Passos, Fouquet, Prudente & Torres-Carvajal, 2019
- Atractus ukupacha — Melo-Sampaio, Passos, Prudente, Venegas & Torres-Carvajal, 2021
- Erythrolamprus rochai — Ascenso, Costa & Prudente, 2019
- Eutrachelophis papilio — Zaher & Prudente, 2019
- Imantodes guane — Missassi & Prudente, 2015
- Leptodeira tarairiu — Costa, Graboski, Grazziotin, Zaher, Rodrigues & Prudente, 2022
- Micrurus anibal — Nascimento, Graboski, Silva-Jr. & Prudente, 2024
- Micrurus bonita — Nascimento, Graboski, Silva-Jr. & Prudente, 2024
- Micrurus janisrozei — Nascimento, Graboski, Silva-Jr. & Prudente, 2024
- Micrurus potyguara — Pires, Da Silva Jr., Feitosa, Prudente, Pereira-Filho & Zaher, 2014
- Micrurus tikuna — Feitosa, Da Silva Jr., Pires, Zaher & Prudente, 2015
- Pseudoboa serrana — Morato, Moura-Leite, Prudente & Bérnils, 1995
- Pseudogonatodes quihuai — Rojas-Runjaic, Koch, Castroviejo-Fisher & Prudente, 2024
