= Eutrachelophis =

Scientific classification
- Kingdom: Animalia
- Phylum: Chordata
- Class: Reptilia
- Order: Squamata
- Suborder: Serpentes
- Family: Colubridae
- Subfamily: Dipsadinae
- Genus: Eutrachelophis; Myers & McDowell, 2014

Genus of snakes

Eutrachelophis is a genus of snakes, known commonly as ivory-naped snakes, of the family Colubridae. The genus contains two species, which are native to South America.

== Species ==
The following species are recognized as being valid.

- Eutrachelophis bassleri Myers & McDowell, 2014 – Ecuador, Peru
- Eutrachelophis papilio Zaher & Prudente, 2019 – Brazil
- Eutrachelophis sp. nov. Larsen & Cortez, 2020 – Bolivia

== Etymology ==
The specific name, bassleri, is in honor of Harvey Bassler (1883–1950), who was an American petroleum engineer and herpetologist.
