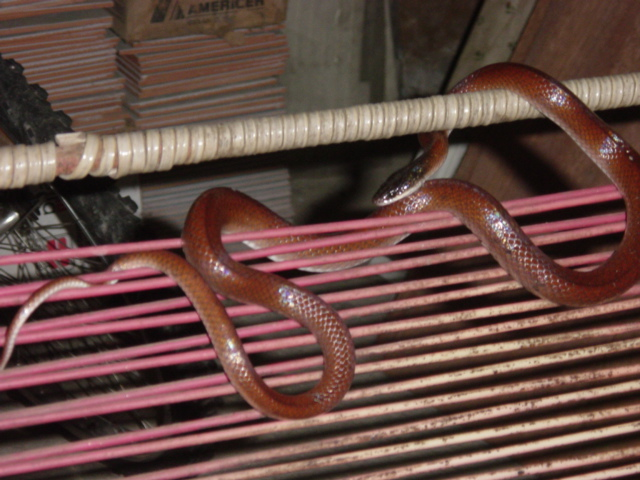
- Pseudoboa neuwiedii

Scientific classification
- Kingdom: Animalia
- Phylum: Chordata
- Class: Reptilia
- Order: Squamata
- Suborder: Serpentes
- Family: Colubridae
- Subfamily: Dipsadinae
- Genus: Pseudoboa; Schneider, 1801

= Pseudoboa =

Genus of snakes

Pseudoboa is a genus of snakes, also known commonly as the false boas, in the subfamily Dipsadinae of family Colubridae. The genus is endemic to South America.

== Species ==
The genus Pseudoboa contains six species which are recognized as being valid.

- Pseudoboa coronata Schneider, 1801 – crowned false boa
- Pseudoboa haasi (Boettger, 1905) – Paraná false boa
- Pseudoboa martinsi Zaher, Oliveira & Franco, 2008
- Pseudoboa neuwiedii (A.M.C. Duméril, Bibron & A.H.A. Duméril, 1854) – dark-headed red false boa, Neuwied's false boa
- Pseudoboa nigra (A.M.C. Duméril, Bibron & A.H.A. Duméril, 1854) – black false boa
- Pseudoboa serrana Morato, Moura-Leite, Prudente & Bérnils, 1995

Nota bene: A binomial authority in parentheses indicates that the species was originally described in a genus other than Pseudoboa.
