= Puta da Silva =

Brazilian artist and activist

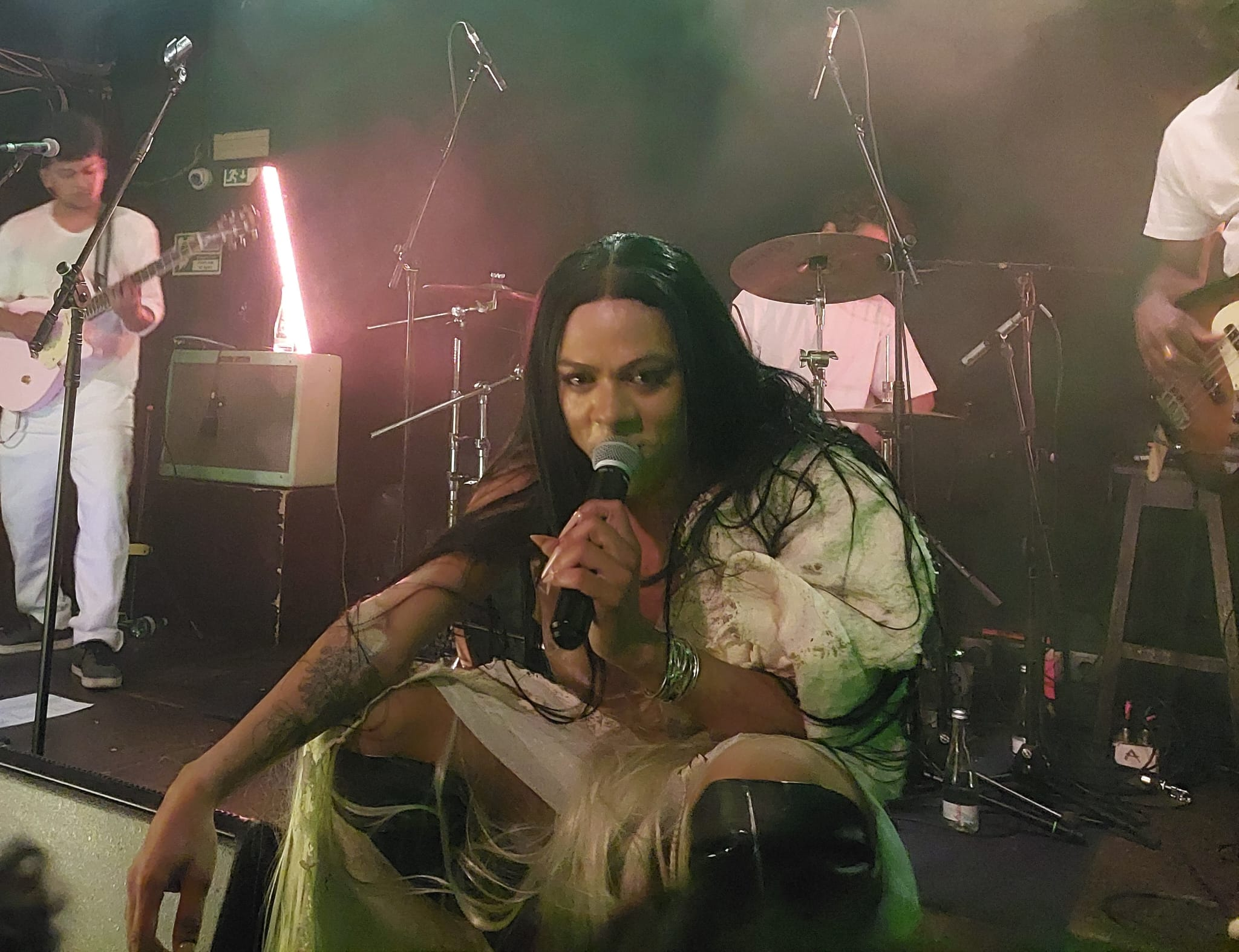
- Education: Federal University of Uberlândia
- Occupations: Teacher, theatre director, sex worker

Àkila, also known as Puta da Silva, is a Brazilian multi-artist and transgender activist, living in Lisbon. She combines her career in Brazilian theater with her experiences as an immigrant to create songs. Her video performance Bruxonas received an honorable mention at the Híbrido de Videodança festival. She is a co-founder of Casa T Lisboa, an association that supports LGBTQIAP+ people. She has performed at venues such as the official residence of Portugal's 118th prime minister, António Costa, where she gave a concert as part of the bicentennial celebration of Brazil's independence; at the 2022 Venice Art Biennale, in Jota Mombaça's performance Water Is Coming; in Serpa, at the Futurama Festival; and at the 17th anniversary of Musicbox Lisboa, where she performed a live rendition of Gal Costa's album India.

== Awards and Recognition ==
- The music video for “Bruxonas” was selected for the 2020 MVF Awards in the category of Best Brazilian Music Video Made During Lockdown, and was screened at the 17th edition of the Coquetel Molotov Festival (2020) – Mundo Imersivo 3D and at the 14th edition of the For Rainbow Festival 2020. It also won an honorable mention at the Híbridos de Videodança festival.
- The video “Hetero Curioso” was selected for the 6th edition of the Bogotá Music Video Festival.
- “Festinha 360,” a virtual reality music video, premiered in 2021 at Cinema São Jorge during the Política Festival, with in-person screenings at cultural venues throughout Lisbon.
- His performance piece Navalha na Carne won the 9th edition of the Amélia Rey Colaço Grant, offering a contemporary reinterpretation of the play of the same name by Brazilian author Plínio Marcos.

== Discography ==
=== Albums ===
- 2022 – EPI Travesti

=== Singles ===
- 2020 – Bruxonas
- 2021 – Hetero Curioso
- 2021 – Festinha 360
- 2022 – Histérica e Louca (Participation)
