= Pseudoboa martinsi =

Conservation status
- Least Concern (IUCN 3.1)

Scientific classification
- Kingdom: Animalia
- Phylum: Chordata
- Class: Reptilia
- Order: Squamata
- Suborder: Serpentes
- Family: Colubridae
- Genus: Pseudoboa
- Species: P. martinsi

Binomial name
- Pseudoboa martinsi Zaher, Oliveira & Franco, 2008

Species of snake

Pseudoboa martinsi is a species of snake in the subfamily Dipsadinae of the family Colubridae. The species is endemic to Brazil.

== Etymology ==
The specific name, martinsi, is in honor of Brazilian herpetologist Márcio Roberto Costa Martins.

== Description ==
Pseudoboa martinsi may attain a total length (tail included) of 1.09 m (3.6 ft).

Dorsally, it is black, except for a wide nuchal color which is pale reddish tan. Ventrally it is red, extending up onto the first few rows of dorsal scales. The dorsal scales are smooth, lack apical pits, and in 17 rows at midbody.

== Geographic range ==
Pseudoboa martinsi is found in northwestern Brazil, in the Amazon Basin, in the Brazilian states of Amazonas, Pará, Rondônia, and Roraima.

== Habitat ==
The preferred natural habitat of Pseudoboa martinsi is forest.

== Behavior ==
Pseudoboa martinsi is nocturnal and terrestrial, but it is not adverse to entering water.

== Diet ==
Stomach contents indicate that Pseudoboa martinsi preys upon smaller termite-eating snakes.

== Reproduction ==
Pseudoboa martinsi is oviparous.
