= Allobates liniaureum =

Scientific classification
- Kingdom: Animalia
- Phylum: Chordata
- Class: Amphibia
- Order: Anura
- Family: Aromobatidae
- Genus: Allobates
- Species: A. liniaureum

Binomial name
- Allobates liniaureum Jaramillo-Martinez, Vilà, Guayasamin, Gagliardi-Urrutia, Rojas-Runjaic, Simões, Chaparro, Aguilar-Manihuari, and Castroviejo-Fisher, 2025

Species of frog

Allobates liniaureum, the golden line nurse frog or rana nodriza de línea dorada, is a frog in the family Aromobatidae. It is endemic to Peru.

== Description ==
The adult male frog measures about 14.2–14.8 mm in snout-vent length and the adult female frog about 15.0 mm. The skin of the dorsum is brown or cream-white in color with brown spots. There is a light brown dorsolateral on each side of the body. When the frog is alive, this brown stripe has flecks of iridescent gold. The dorsal surfaces of the front legs are yellow-gold in color. The dorsal surfaces of the back legs are brown or cream-white in color with brown spots. There is a dark brown stripe on each side of the body, all the way to where the back legs meet the body. There is also a smaller, lighter stripe from where the front legs meet the body to where the back legs meet the body. The ventral surfaces are yellow near the front of the body and white further back. The iris of the eye is gold in color with dark brown reticulations.

== Etymology ==
Scientists named this frog liniaureum for the Latin words linum for "thread" or "string" and aureum for "golden." They named this frog for its iridescent gold stripes.

== Home ==
This frog is awake during the day. Scientists have seen this frog in exactly one place: about 6 km from Yurimaguas airport, about 202 meters above sea level in Loreto.
