= Leptodeira tarairiu =

Scientific classification
- Kingdom: Animalia
- Phylum: Chordata
- Class: Reptilia
- Order: Squamata
- Suborder: Serpentes
- Family: Colubridae
- Genus: Leptodeira
- Species: L. tarairiu

Binomial name
- Leptodeira tarairiu Costa, Graboski, Grazziotin, Zaher, Rodrigues, & Prudente, 2022

Species of snake

Leptodeira tarairiu is a species of snake in the family Colubridae. The species is native to Brazil.
