= Phyzelaphryne nimio =

Scientific classification
- Kingdom: Animalia
- Phylum: Chordata
- Class: Amphibia
- Order: Anura
- Clade: Brachycephaloidea
- Family: Eleutherodactylidae
- Genus: Phyzelaphryne
- Species: P. nimio

Binomial name
- Phyzelaphryne nimio Simões, Costa, Rojas-Runjaic, Gagliardi-Urrutia, Sturaro, Peloso, and Castroviejo-Fisher, 2018

Species of frog

Phyzelaphryne nimio is a species of frog in the family Eleutherodactylidae. It is endemic to Brazil where it is found in the Japurá River basin. It is a poorly known species, only discovered on one river bank.
