= Eutrachelophis bassleri =

Scientific classification
- Kingdom: Animalia
- Phylum: Chordata
- Class: Reptilia
- Order: Squamata
- Suborder: Serpentes
- Family: Colubridae
- Genus: Eutrachelophis
- Species: E. bassleri

Binomial name
- Eutrachelophis bassleri Myers & McDowell, 2014

Species of snake

Eutrachelophis bassleri is a species of snake in the family Colubridae. The species is found in Peru and Ecuador.
