= Fernando J.M. Rojas-Runjaic =

Venezuelan-Brazilian zoologist (born 1979)

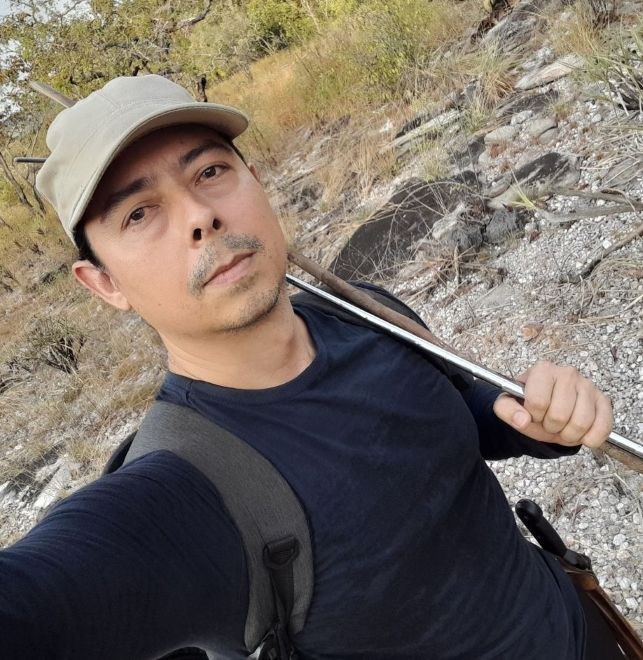
- Born: May 28, 1979 (age 46); Valera, Trujillo State, Venezuela
- Occupations: Biologist (zoologist, herpetologist, arachnologist)
- Employer: Fundación La Salle de Ciencias Naturales

Fernando José María Rojas Runjaić (born May 28, 1979) is a Venezuelan-Brazilian herpetologist and arachnologist. He is curator of the collections of amphibians, reptiles, and arachnids at the La Salle Natural History Museum of the Fundación La Salle de Ciencias Naturales in Caracas.

In 2004 he obtained his Bachelor's degree in Biology from the University of Zulia (Venezuela), in 2012 his master's in Biodiversity in Tropical Areas and its Conservation from the Menéndez Pelayo International University (Spain), and in 2019 his PhD in Zoology from the Pontifícia Universidade Católica do Rio Grande do Sul (Brazil).

He is the author of more than 200 scientific publications and has discovered and described three genera and 33 new species to science (17 amphibian anurans, three lizards, three snakes, and 10 scorpions).

== Described taxa ==
=== Genera ===
- Chactopsoides Ochoa, Rojas-Runjaic, Pinto-da-Rocha & Prendini, 2013
- Kataphraktosaurus Rojas-Runjaic, Barrio-Amorós, Señaris, De la Riva & Castroviejo-Fisher, 2021
- Megachactops Ochoa, Rojas-Runjaic, Pinto-da-Rocha & Prendini, 2013

=== Species ===
- Adenomera glauciae Carvalho, Simões, Gagliardi-Urrutia, Rojas-Runjaic, Haddad & Castroviejo-Fisher, 2020
- Allobates juami Simões, Gagliardi-Urrutia, Rojas-Runjaic & Castroviejo-Fisher, 2018
- Allobates sieggreenae Gagliardi-Urrutia, Castroviejo-Fisher, Rojas-Runjaic, Jaramillo, Solís & Simões, 2021
- Allobates liniaureum Jaramillo-Martinez, Vilà, Guayasamin, Gagliardi-Urrutia, Rojas-Runjaic, Simões, Chaparro, Aguilar-Manihuari & Castroviejo-Fisher, 2025
- Ananteris diegorojasi Rojas-Runjaic, 2005
- Ananteris riomachensis Rojas-Runjaic, Portillo-Quintero & Borges, 2008
- Aromobates tokuko Rojas-Runjaic, Infante-Rivero & Barrio-Amorós, 2011
- Atractus nemosophis Esqueda, Rojas-Runjaic, Prudente, Bazó, Navarrete, Camargo-Sillet, Ortiz, Correa, Guerrero & Urra, 2025
- Atractus xaxi Esqueda, Rojas-Runjaic, Prudente, Bazó, Navarrete, Camargo-Sillet, Ortiz, Correa, Guerrero & Urra, 2025
- Boana platanera La Marca, Escalona, Castellanos, Rojas-Runjaic, Crawford, Señaris, Fouquet, Giaretta & Castroviejo-Fisher, 2021
- Chactas viloriai Rojas-Runjaic, 2004
- Chactopsis chullachaqui Ochoa, Rojas-Runjaic, Pinto-da-Rocha & Prendini, 2013
- Chactopsis curupira Ochoa, Rojas-Runjaic, Pinto-da-Rocha & Prendini, 2013
- Chactopsoides gonzalezspongai Ochoa, Rojas-Runjaic, Pinto-da-Rocha & Prendini, 2013
- Cryptobatrachus remotus Infante-Rivero, Rojas-Runjaic, & Barrio-Amorós, 2009 "2008"
- Gonatodes lichenosus Rojas-Runjaic, Infante-Rivero, Cabello & Velozo, 2010
- Hyloscirtus japreria Rojas-Runjaic, Infante-Rivero, Salerno & Meza-Joya, 2018
- Kataphraktosaurus ungerhamiltoni Rojas-Runjaic, Barrio-Amorós, Señaris, De la Riva & Castroviejo-Fisher, 2021
- Mannophryne molinai Rojas-Runjaic, Matta-Pereira & La Marca, 2018
- Megachactops kuemoi Ochoa, Rojas-Runjaic, Pinto-da-Rocha & Prendini, 2013
- Opisthacanthus brevicauda Rojas-Runjaic, Borges & De Armas, 2008
- Phyzelaphryne nimio Simões, Costa, Rojas-Runjaic, Gagliardi-Urrutia, Sturaro, Peloso & Castroviejo-Fisher, 2018
- Pristimantis abakapa Rojas-Runjaic, Salerno, Señaris & Pauly, 2013
- Pristimantis fasciatus Barrio-Amorós, Rojas-Runjaic & Infante-Rivero, 2008 "2007"
- Pristimantis lassoalcalai Barrio Amorós, Rojas-Runjaic & Barros, 2010
- Pristimantis munozi Rojas-Runjaic, Delgado & Guayasamin, 2014
- Pristimantis rivasi Barrio Amorós, Rojas-Runjaic & Barros, 2010
- Pristimantis turik Barrio-Amorós, Rojas-Runjaic & Infante-Rivero, 2008 "2007"
- Pristimantis yukpa Barrio-Amorós, Rojas-Runjaic & Infante-Rivero, 2008 "2007"
- Pseudogonatodes quihuai Rojas-Runjaic, Koch, Castroviejo-Fisher & Prudente, 2024
- Tantilla palamala Esqueda, Rojas-Runjaic, Correa, Ortiz, Guerrero, Jiménez, Bazó, Moreno-Pérez, Aguilar & Urra, 2025
- Tityus rondonorum Rojas-Runjaic & De Armas, 2007
- Tityus wayuu Rojas-Runjaic & De Armas, 2007
