= Amerotyphlops arenensis =

Scientific classification
- Kingdom: Animalia
- Phylum: Chordata
- Class: Reptilia
- Order: Squamata
- Suborder: Serpentes
- Family: Typhlopidae
- Genus: Amerotyphlops
- Species: A. arenensis

Binomial name
- Amerotyphlops arenensis Graboski, Pereira-Filho, Silva, Prudente & Zaher, 2015

Species of snake

Amerotyphlops arenensis is a species of blind snake in the family Typhlopidae. It is endemic to Brazil, where it has been recorded from the states of Paraíba and Pernambuco. The species was described in 2015 from specimens collected at Reserva Ecológica Mata do Pau Ferro, near Areia, Paraíba.

== Taxonomy ==
Amerotyphlops arenensis was described by Roberta Graboski, Gentil Alves Pereira-Filho, Ariane Auxiliadora Araújo da Silva, Ana Lúcia da Costa Prudente and Hussam Zaher in 2015. The holotype is an adult male collected on 19 November 2008 at Reserva Ecológica Mata do Pau Ferro in the municipality of Areia, Paraíba, Brazil. The specific name arenensis refers to Areia, the type locality.

== Distribution and habitat ==
The species was originally known from an upland forest enclave in Paraíba, northeastern Brazil. A later atlas of Brazilian snakes treated it as endemic to Brazil and associated with the Caatinga and contact areas with the Atlantic Forest and Cerrado, at intermediate to high elevations.
