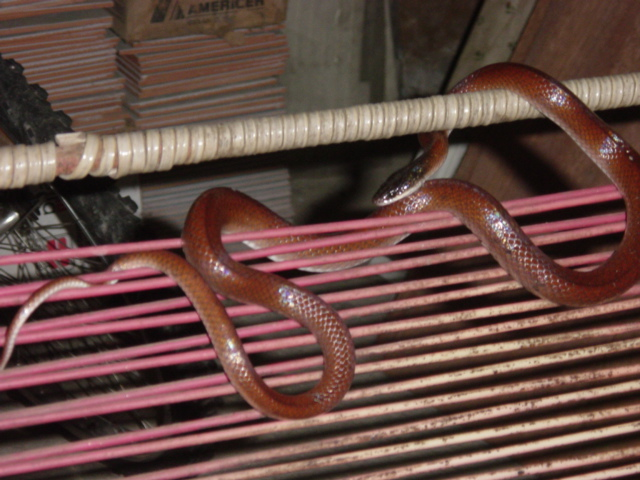
- Pseudoboa neuwiedii in a house in El Limón, Venezuela

Conservation status
- Least Concern (IUCN 3.1)

Scientific classification
- Kingdom: Animalia
- Phylum: Chordata
- Class: Reptilia
- Order: Squamata
- Suborder: Serpentes
- Family: Colubridae
- Genus: Pseudoboa
- Species: P. neuwiedii

Binomial name
- Pseudoboa neuwiedii (A.M.C. Duméril, Bibron & A.H.A. Duméril, 1854)

Synonyms
- Scytale neuwiedii A.M.C. Duméril, Bibron & A.H.A. Duméril, 1854; Oxyrhopus neuwiedii (A.M.C. Duméril, Bibron & A.H.A. Duméril, 1854); Olisthenes euphæus Cope, 1859; Rhinocheilus thominoti Bocourt, 1887; Pseudoboa robinsoni Stejneger, 1902

= Pseudoboa neuwiedii =

Species of snake

Pseudoboa neuwiedii, commonly known as the dark-headed red false boa or Neuwied's false boa, is a species of snake in the subfamily Dipsadinae of the family Colubridae. The species is native to northern South America.

== Geographic distribution ==
Pseudoboa neuwiedii is found on the mainland of South America from Colombia to The Guianas, and in Brazil along the Amazon River, as well as in Grenada, and Trinidad and Tobago.

== Etymology ==
The specific name, neuwiedii, is in honor of German naturalist Prince Maximilian of Wied-Neuwied.

== Description ==
Pseudoboa neuwiedii grows to a maximum total length (tail included) of 1 m (39 in).

Dorsally, it is reddish brown, either uniform or with some scattered small black spots. The top of the head and neck are black or dark brown. There may or may not be a yellowish crossband or collar across the temples and occiput. Ventrally, it is yellowish. This snake is venomous, but due the anatomy of its teeth it has difficulty in inoculating venom, its venom is highly proteolytic and could affect the coagulation by degrading the fibrinogen.

== Behavior ==
Pseudoboa neuwiedii is a powerful constrictor.

== Diet ==
Pseudoboa neuwiedii feeds on any animal it can capture and subdue. Individuals have been reported to consume snakes as large as or larger than they themselves are.

== Reproduction ==
P. neuwiedii is oviparous.
