= Phyzelaphryne miriamae =

Conservation status
- Least Concern (IUCN 3.1)

Scientific classification
- Kingdom: Animalia
- Phylum: Chordata
- Class: Amphibia
- Order: Anura
- Family: Eleutherodactylidae
- Genus: Phyzelaphryne
- Species: P. miriamae

Binomial name
- Phyzelaphryne miriamae Heyer, 1977

Species of frog

Phyzelaphryne miriamae, commonly known as Miriam's frog, is a species of frog in the family Eleutherodactylidae. It is endemic to Brazil where it is found in the drainage of Madeira and Tapajos rivers, in the southern Amazon Basin. It might also occur in Bolivia.

Phyzelaphryne miriamae is found in leaf-litter in lowland rainforests. It is locally threatened by habitat loss.
