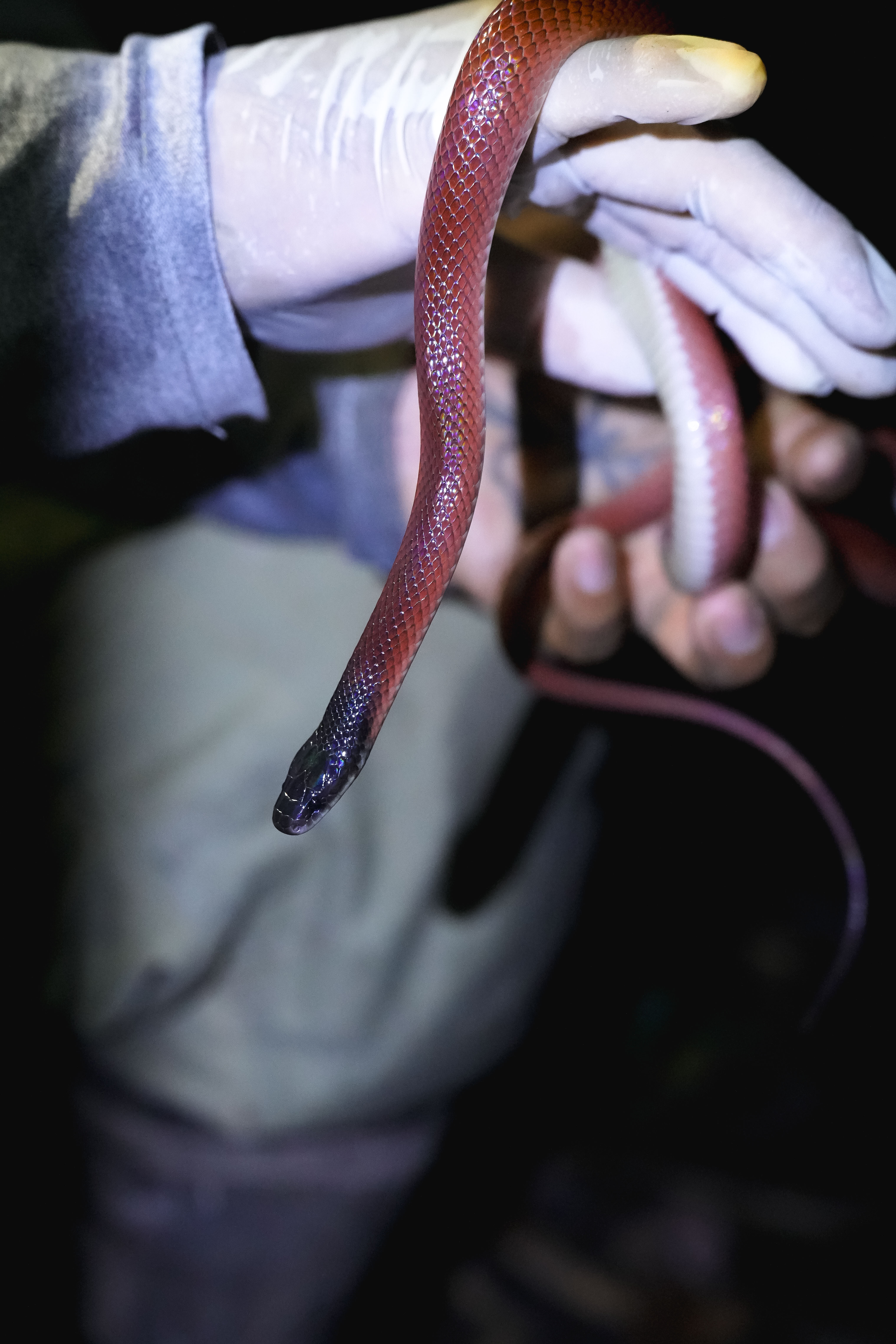

Conservation status
- Least Concern (IUCN 3.1)

Scientific classification
- Kingdom: Animalia
- Phylum: Chordata
- Class: Reptilia
- Order: Squamata
- Suborder: Serpentes
- Family: Colubridae
- Genus: Pseudoboa
- Species: P. coronata

Binomial name
- Pseudoboa coronata Schneider, 1801

Synonyms
- Scytale coronata (Schneider, 1801); Scytale coronatum (Schneider, 1801); Oxyrhopus coronatus (Schneider, 1801)

= Crowned false boa =

Species of snake

The crowned false boa (Pseudoboa coronata) is a species of snake in the family Colubridae. The species is endemic to South America.

== Distribution ==
P. coronata is found in Bolivia, Brazil, Colombia, Ecuador, French Guiana, Guyana, Peru, Suriname, and Venezuela.

== Reproduction ==
P. coronata is oviparous.
