= Micrurus janisrozei =

Scientific classification
- Kingdom: Animalia
- Phylum: Chordata
- Order: Squamata
- Suborder: Serpentes
- Family: Elapidae
- Genus: Micrurus
- Species: M. janisrozei

Binomial name
- Micrurus janisrozei L. Nascimento, Graboski, Silva Jr. & Prudente, 2024

Species of snake

Micrurus janisrozei is a species of venomous coral snake in the family Elapidae. The species is endemic to Brazil, where it is known from the Brazilian state of Bahia. The species was described in 2024 as part of an integrative taxonomic review of the Micrurus ibiboboca species complex.

== Taxonomy ==
Micrurus janisrozei was described by Lywouty R. S. Nascimento, Roberta Graboski, Nelson J. Silva Jr., and Ana Lúcia da Costa Prudente in 2024. The holotype is an adult male, MUFAL 11876, from Caetité, Bahia, Brazil.

The specific name janisrozei honors Janis A. Roze, a Latvian-American herpetologist known for his work on coral snakes.

== Description ==
Micrurus janisrozei was distinguished from other species of Micrurus by a combination of characters including a predominantly white snout with black-bordered scales, black-tipped parietal scales, 8–12 body triads, 209–238 ventral scales in males, 212–244 ventral scales in females, 17–27 subcaudal scales in males, and 16–26 subcaudal scales in females.

The holotype has 230 ventral scales, 22 subcaudal scales, a snout-to-vent length (SVL) of 753 mm (29.6 in), and a tail length of 44 mm (1.7 in).

== Distribution and habitat ==
The type locality for Micrurus janisrozei is Caetité municipality, Bahia, Brazil. The Reptile Database lists the species from Bahia. The original description states that the species occurs in elevated regions of the Chapada Diamantina and in the southern part of the Caatinga, and is associated with Caatinga and elevated areas of dry Atlantic Forest in the Chapada Diamantina complex.
