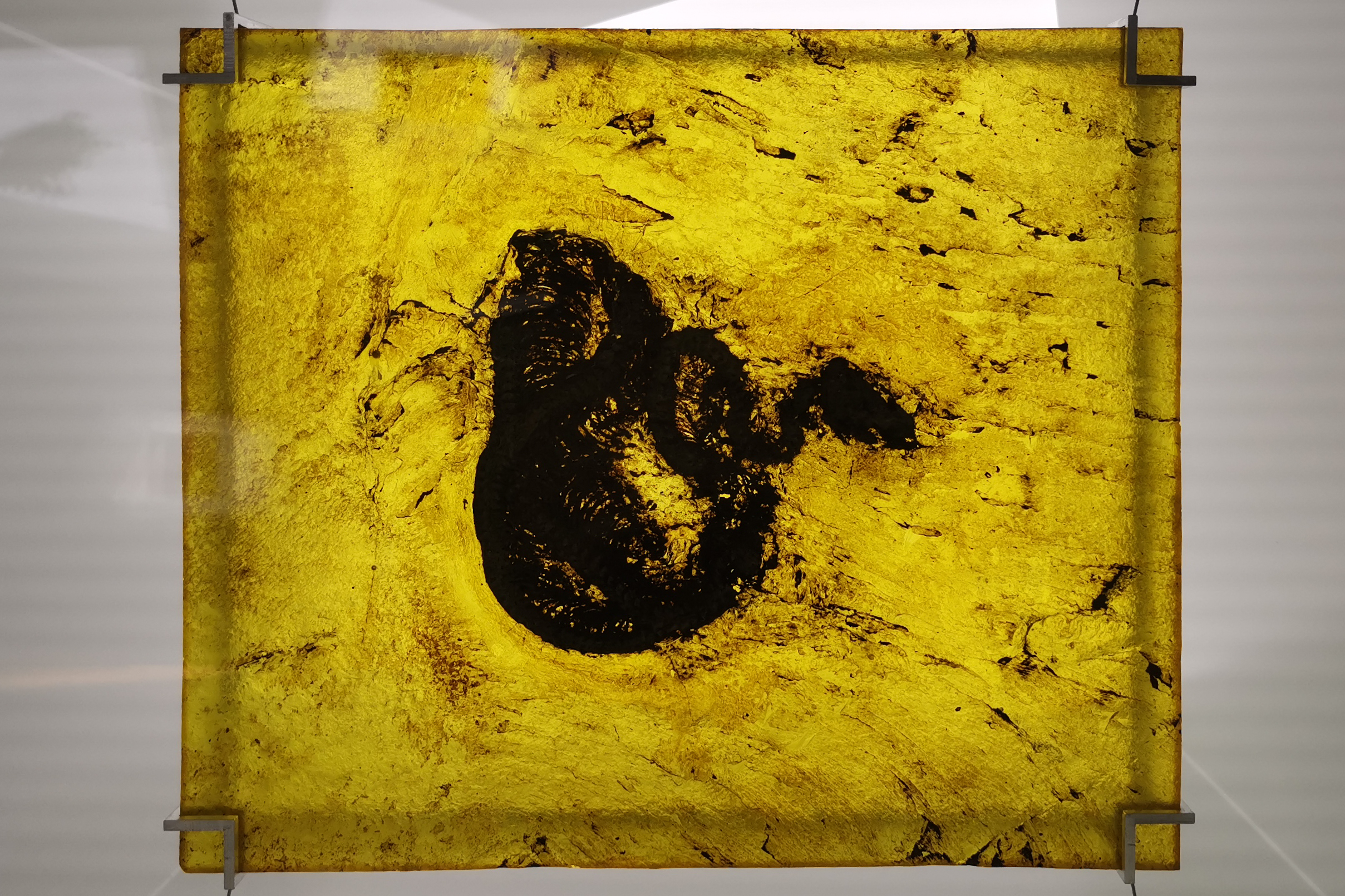

Scientific classification
- Kingdom: Animalia
- Phylum: Chordata
- Class: Reptilia
- Order: Squamata
- Suborder: Serpentes
- Family: Pythonidae
- Genus: †Messelopython; Zaher and Smith, 2020

= Messelopython =

Messelopython Temporal range: Lutetian

Genus of reptiles (fossil)

Messelopython is an extinct genus of pythonoid that lived in Germany during the Lutetian.
