= Micrurus bonita =

Scientific classification
- Kingdom: Animalia
- Phylum: Chordata
- Class: Reptilia
- Order: Squamata
- Suborder: Serpentes
- Family: Elapidae
- Genus: Micrurus
- Species: M. bonita

Binomial name
- Micrurus bonita Nascimento, Graboski, Silva Jr. & Prudente, 2024

Species of snake

Micrurus bonita is a species of coral snake in the family Elapidae. It is endemic to Brazil, where it is known from northeastern Brazil. The species was described in 2024 as part of an integrative taxonomic review of the Micrurus ibiboboca species complex.

== Taxonomy ==
Micrurus bonita was described by Lywouty R. S. Nascimento, Roberta Graboski, Nelson J. Silva Jr. and Ana Lúcia da Costa Prudente in 2024. The holotype is an adult male, CZGB 484, from Petrolândia, Pernambuco, Brazil.

The specific epithet bonita refers to Maria Gomes de Oliveira, better known as Maria Bonita, a historical figure associated with the Cangaço movement in northeastern Brazil.

== Distribution ==
The type locality of Micrurus bonita is Petrolândia municipality, Pernambuco, Brazil. The Reptile Database lists the species from Pernambuco, and the original type series also includes paratypes from Alagoas.
