= Eutrachelophis papilio =

Scientific classification
- Kingdom: Animalia
- Phylum: Chordata
- Class: Reptilia
- Order: Squamata
- Suborder: Serpentes
- Family: Colubridae
- Genus: Eutrachelophis
- Species: E. papilio

Binomial name
- Eutrachelophis papilio Zaher & Prudente, 2019

Species of snake

Eutrachelophis papilio is a species of snake in the family Colubridae. The species is found in Brazil.
