= Phyzelaphryne =

Scientific classification
- Kingdom: Animalia
- Phylum: Chordata
- Class: Amphibia
- Order: Anura
- Family: Eleutherodactylidae
- Subfamily: Phyzelaphryninae
- Genus: Phyzelaphryne; Heyer, 1977

Genus of amphibians

Phyzelaphryne, commonly known as Miriam's frogs, is a genus of frogs in the family Eleutherodactylidae. The species in this genus are endemic to Brazil. Considered as monotypic until 2018, there are two species currently recognised:

== Species ==
- Phyzelaphryne miriamae Heyer, 1977
- Phyzelaphryne nimio Simões, Costa, Rojas-Runjaic, Gagliardi-Urrutia, Sturaro, Peloso, and Castroviejo-Fisher, 2018

== See also ==
Related species: Common coquí Eleutherodactylus coqui
