= Pseudoboa haasi =

Conservation status
- Least Concern (IUCN 3.1)

Scientific classification
- Kingdom: Animalia
- Phylum: Chordata
- Class: Reptilia
- Order: Squamata
- Suborder: Serpentes
- Family: Colubridae
- Genus: Pseudoboa
- Species: P. haasi

Binomial name
- Pseudoboa haasi (Boettger, 1905)

Synonyms
- Oxyrrhopus haasi Boettger, 1905; Pseudoboa haasi — Giraudo & Schrocchi, 2002

Species of snake

Pseudoboa haasi, also known commonly as the Paraná false boa, is a species of snake in the subfamily Dipsadinae of the family Colubridae. The species is native to Argentina and Brazil.

== Etymology ==
The specific name, haasi, is in honor Albrecht Haas who collected the holotype.

== Geographic range ==
P. haasi is found in southern Brazil, in the states of Paraná, Rio Grande do Sul, and Santa Catarina; and in extreme northeastern Argentina, in the province of Misiones.

== Habitat ==
The preferred natural habitat of P. haasi is forest, but it also can survive in disturbed areas.

== Behavior ==
P. haasi is terrestrial and diurnal.

== Diet ==
P. haasi preys upon lizards, snakes, and small mammals.

== Reproduction ==
P. haasi is oviparous. Clutch size is 4–7 eggs.
