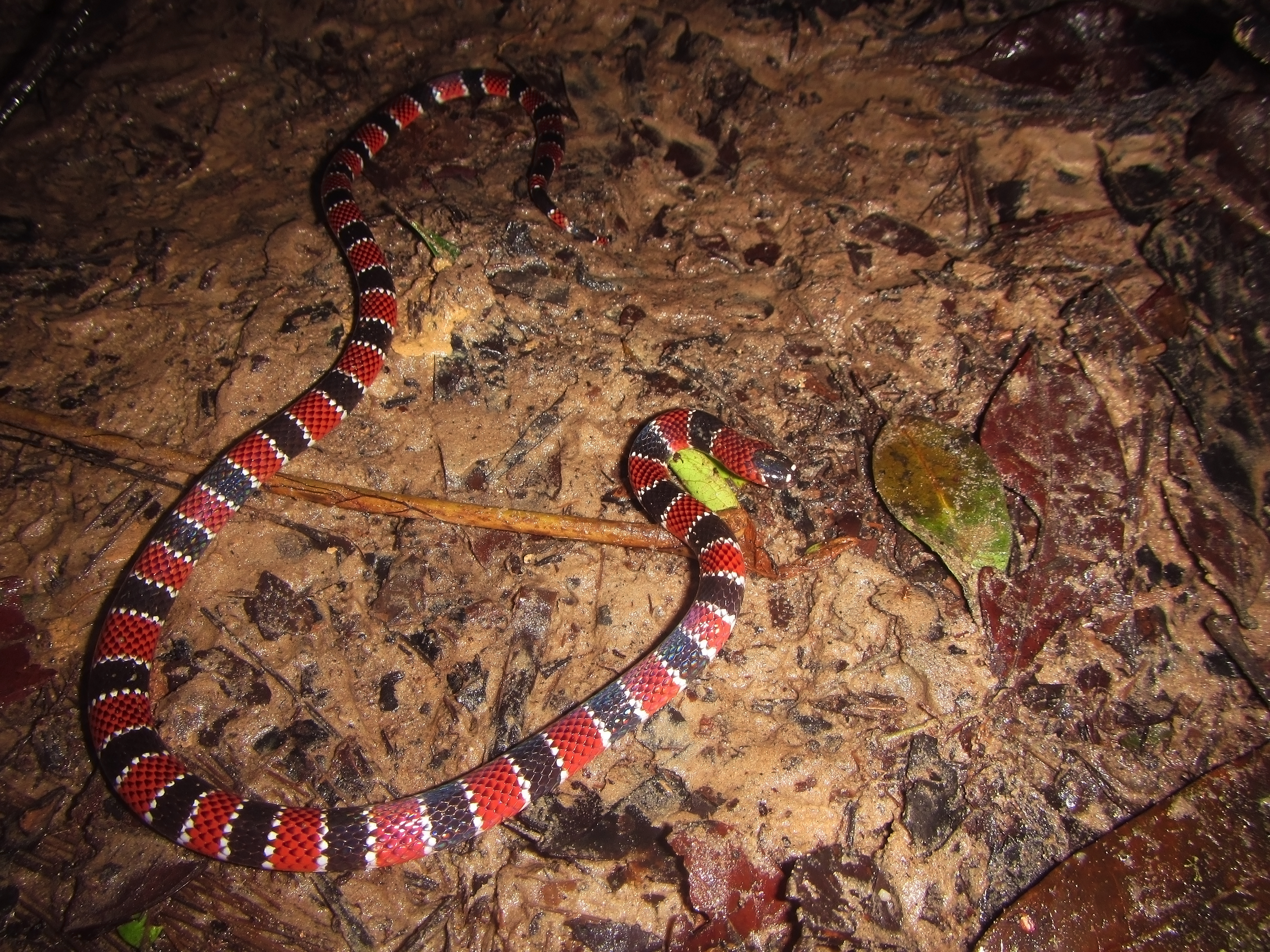

Scientific classification
- Kingdom: Animalia
- Phylum: Chordata
- Class: Reptilia
- Order: Squamata
- Suborder: Serpentes
- Family: Elapidae
- Genus: Micrurus
- Species: M. tikuna

Binomial name
- Micrurus tikuna Feitosa, Silva Jr., Pires, Zaher & Prudente, 2015

= Micrurus tikuna =

Species of snake

Micrurus tikuna, also known commonly as the Tikuna coral snake and coral tikuna in South American Spanish, is a species of venomous snake in the family Elapidae. The species is native to northwestern South America.

== Description ==
Medium-sized for its genus, Micrurus tikuna may attain a total length (tail included) of 70 cm (28 in).

The color pattern consists of red, white, and black rings, with the black rings not grouped in triads. The top of the head is black, including the parietal scales. The black cap is followed by a thin white crossband, and then the first red ring. There is no black nuchal collar. The red rings are widest, 4–6 dorsal scales wide. The black rings are narrower, 3–4 dorsal scales wide. The white rings are narrowest, one dorsal or less wide. The white rings are interrupted by red or black dorsals of adjacent rings, giving the appearance of a transverse series of white dots. Both sexes have 27–31 black rings on the body. Unlike many other New World coral snakes, the tricolor pattern continues on the tail. There are 6–7 black rings on the tail.

Males have about 205 ventrals and about 47 subcaudals, and females have about 225 ventrals and about 38 subcaudals.

== Geographic distribution ==
Micrurus tikuna is found in northwestern Brazil (state of Amazonas), southeastern Colombia (Amazonas Department), and possibly adjacent northeastern Peru.

M. tikuna has been found at elevations of 80–100 m (260–330 ft).

== Behavior ==
Micrurus tikuna is terrestrial and diurnal.

== Reproduction ==
Micrurus tikuna is oviparous.

== Etymology ==
The specific name, tikuna, is a reference to the Ticuna, an indigenous people of the area where Micrurus tikuna is found. Also, the name of the Ticuna is derived from the Tupi word, tacouma, meaning a man with his face or nose painted black, a description which may be applied to this species.
