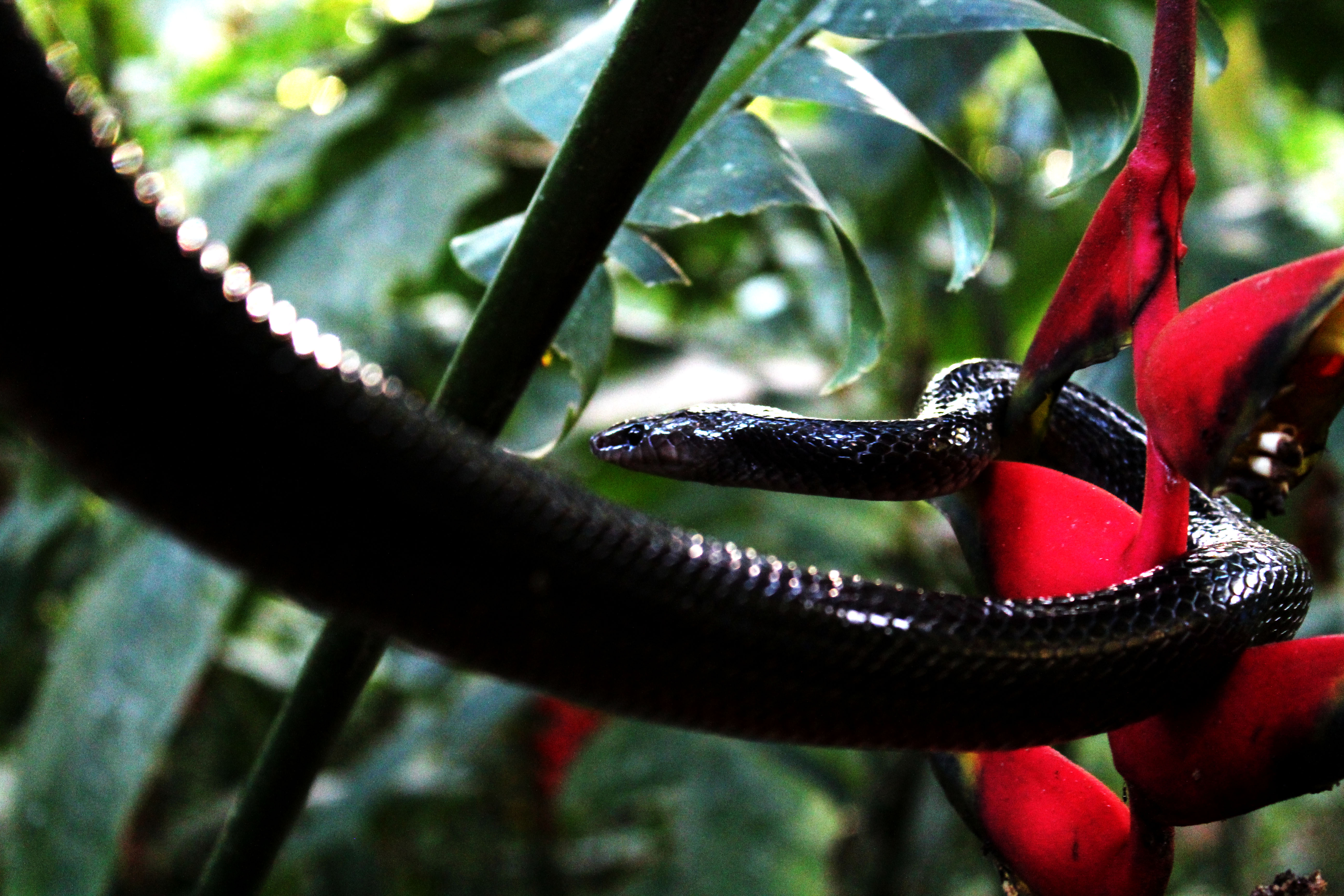

Conservation status
- Least Concern (IUCN 3.1)

Scientific classification
- Kingdom: Animalia
- Phylum: Chordata
- Class: Reptilia
- Order: Squamata
- Suborder: Serpentes
- Family: Colubridae
- Genus: Pseudoboa
- Species: P. nigra

Binomial name
- Pseudoboa nigra (A.M.C. Duméril, Bibron & A.H.A. Duméril, 1854)

Synonyms
- Scytale neuwiedii A.M.C. Duméril, Bibron & A.H.A. Duméril, 1854

= Pseudoboa nigra =

Species of snake

Pseudoboa nigra, the black false boa, is a species of snake of the family Colubridae.

== Geographic range ==
The snake is found in Brazil, Bolivia, and Paraguay.
