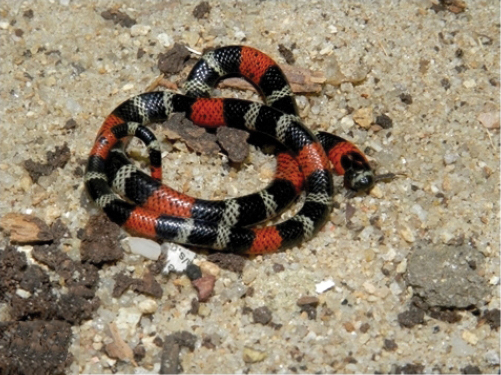

Conservation status
- Near Threatened (IUCN 3.1)

Scientific classification
- Kingdom: Animalia
- Phylum: Chordata
- Class: Reptilia
- Order: Squamata
- Suborder: Serpentes
- Family: Elapidae
- Genus: Micrurus
- Species: M. potyguara

Binomial name
- Micrurus potyguara Pires, Silva Jr., Feitosa, Prudente, Filho & Zaher, 2014
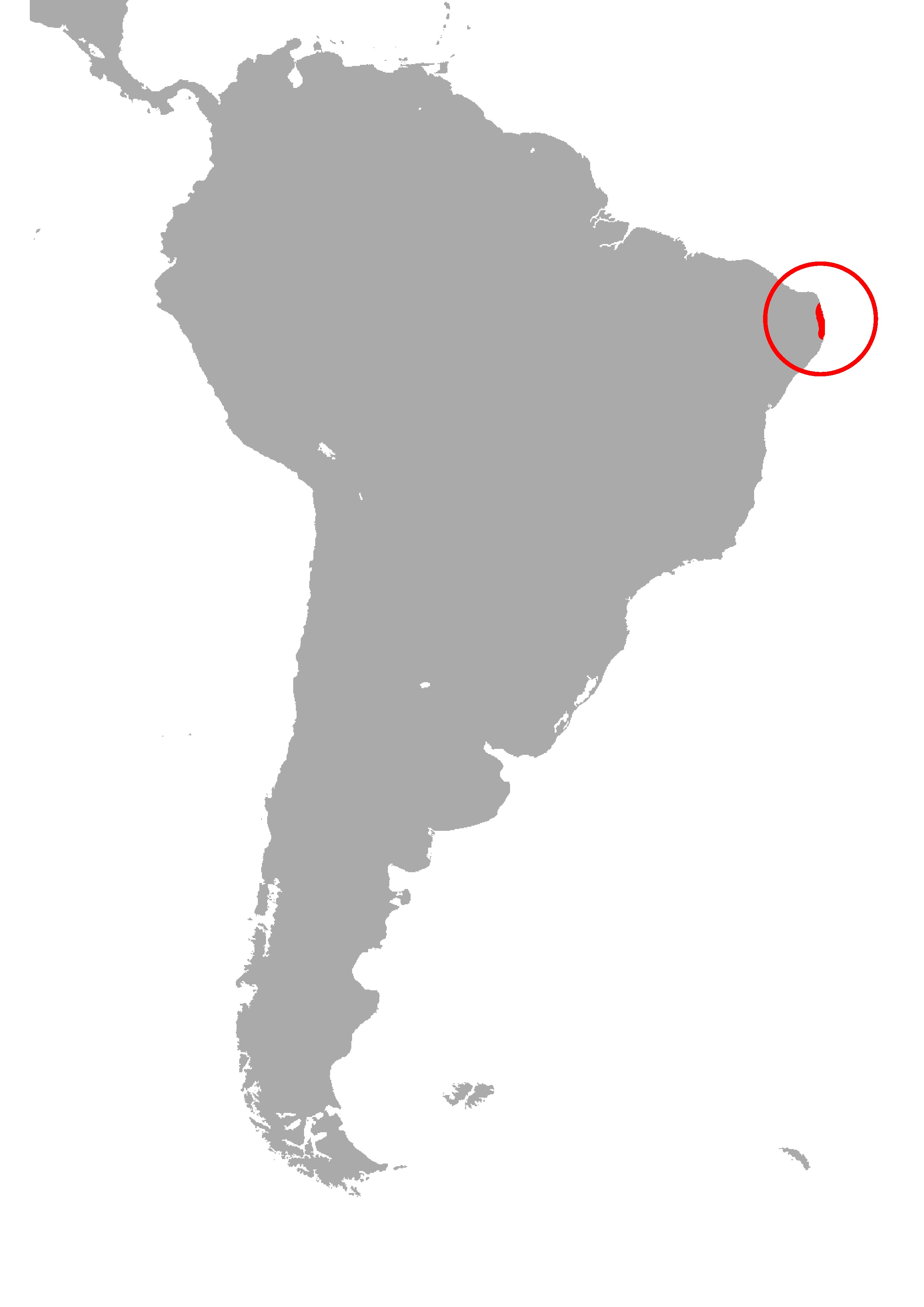

= Micrurus potyguara =

Species of snake

Micrurus potyguara, also known commonly as the Paraíba coral snake and the Potyguara coral snake, is a species of venomous snake in the family Elapidae. The species is endemic to Brazil.

== Etymology ==
The specific name, potyguara, is honor of the Potyguara, an indigenous people of northeastern Brazil.

== Description ==
The color pattern of Micrurus potyguara consists of red, white, and black rings, with the black rings arranged in triads. All three black rings of each triad are approximately equal in width. The white rings are narrower than the black. The red rings, which separate the triads, are the widest. The dorsal scales of the white rings are heavily edged and tipped with black, so that from a distance the rings appear to be gray. Some of the dorsal scales of the red rings are tipped with black.

Unusual for the genus Micrurus, the head of M. potyguara is wide and distinct from the neck.

== Geographic distribution ==
Micrurus potyguara is found in northeastern Brazil, in the Brazilian states of Paraíba, Pernambuco, and Rio Grande do Norte.

== Habitat ==
The preferred natural habitat of Micrurus potyguara is forest.

== Behavior ==
Micrurus potyguara is terrestrial.

== Reproduction ==
Micrurus potyguara is oviparous.
