= Amerotyphlops caetanoi =

Scientific classification
- Kingdom: Animalia
- Phylum: Chordata
- Class: Reptilia
- Order: Squamata
- Suborder: Serpentes
- Family: Typhlopidae
- Genus: Amerotyphlops
- Species: A. caetanoi

Binomial name
- Amerotyphlops caetanoi Graboski, Arredondo, Grazziotin, Guerra-Fuentes, Silva, Prudente, Pinto, Rodrigues, Bonatto & Zaher, 2022

Species of snake

Amerotyphlops caetanoi is a species of blind snake in the family Typhlopidae. It is endemic to Brazil, where it is known from Bahia. The species was described from a specimen collected in Chapada Diamantina National Park, near Lençóis, Bahia.

== Taxonomy ==
Amerotyphlops caetanoi was described by Roberta Graboski, Juan C. Arredondo, Felipe G. Grazziotin, Ricardo Arturo Guerra-Fuentes, Ariane A. A. da Silva, Ana Lúcia da Costa Prudente, Roberta R. Pinto, Miguel Trefaut Rodrigues, Sandro L. Bonatto and Hussam Zaher. The holotype is an adult female, MZUSP S-023380, collected on 15 December 2010 in Chapada Diamantina National Park, in the municipality of Lençóis, Bahia, Brazil.

The specific name caetanoi honors the Brazilian musician and political activist Caetano Veloso, who was born in Bahia.

== Distribution and habitat ==
Amerotyphlops caetanoi is known from Chapada Diamantina National Park, about 2 km (1.2 mi) from Lençóis in Bahia, Brazil. The type locality is in an upland Atlantic dry forest enclave, with submontane seasonal semi-deciduous forest at approximately 400–600 m (1,300–2,000 ft) above sea level.
