= Atractus caxiuana =

Conservation status
- Data Deficient (IUCN 3.1)

Scientific classification
- Kingdom: Animalia
- Phylum: Chordata
- Class: Reptilia
- Order: Squamata
- Suborder: Serpentes
- Family: Colubridae
- Genus: Atractus
- Species: A. caxiuana

Binomial name
- Atractus caxiuana Prudente & Santos-Costa, 2006

Species of snake

Atractus caxiuana is a species of snake in the family Colubridae. The species can be found in Brazil and Colombia. Juveniles have yellow blotches on their nasal region as well as behind their eyes, with a brown body and darker vertebral line one scale wide.
