= Amerotyphlops martis =

Scientific classification
- Kingdom: Animalia
- Phylum: Chordata
- Class: Reptilia
- Order: Squamata
- Suborder: Serpentes
- Family: Typhlopidae
- Genus: Amerotyphlops
- Species: A. martis

Binomial name
- Amerotyphlops martis Graboski, Arredondo, Grazziotin, Guerra-Fuentes, Silva, Prudente, Pinto, Rodrigues, Bonatto & Zaher, 2022

Species of snake

Amerotyphlops martis is a species of blind snake in the family Typhlopidae. It is endemic to Brazil, where it is known from Espírito Santo. The species was described from specimens collected at Praia das Neves, in the municipality of Presidente Kennedy, Espírito Santo.

== Taxonomy ==
Amerotyphlops martis was described by Roberta Graboski, Juan C. Arredondo, Felipe G. Grazziotin, Ricardo Arturo Guerra-Fuentes, Ariane A. A. da Silva, Ana Lúcia da Costa Prudente, Roberta R. Pinto, Miguel Trefaut Rodrigues, Sandro L. Bonatto and Hussam Zaher. The holotype is an adult male, MNRJ 18744, collected between 2 and 8 September 2009 at Praia das Neves, in the municipality of Presidente Kennedy, Espírito Santo, Brazil.

The specific name martis is derived from Mars, in reference to the symbol traditionally used to represent the male sex. The name alludes to the species' distinctive hemipenial morphology.
