= Amerotyphlops montanum =

Scientific classification
- Kingdom: Animalia
- Phylum: Chordata
- Class: Reptilia
- Order: Squamata
- Suborder: Serpentes
- Family: Typhlopidae
- Genus: Amerotyphlops
- Species: A. montanum

Binomial name
- Amerotyphlops montanum Graboski, Arredondo, Grazziotin, Guerra-Fuentes, Silva, Prudente, Pinto, Rodrigues, Bonatto & Zaher, 2022

Species of snake

Amerotyphlops montanum is a species of blind snake in the family Typhlopidae. It is endemic to Brazil, where it is known from Bahia. The species was described from specimens collected in the Serra das Lontras montane complex of southern Bahia.

== Taxonomy ==
Amerotyphlops montanum was described by Roberta Graboski, Juan C. Arredondo, Felipe G. Grazziotin, Ricardo Arturo Guerra-Fuentes, Ariane A. A. da Silva, Ana Lúcia da Costa Prudente, Roberta R. Pinto, Miguel Trefaut Rodrigues, Sandro L. Bonatto and Hussam Zaher. The holotype is an adult female, MZUSP 20065, collected on 6 March 2009 in Serra das Lontras National Park, in the municipality of Arataca, Bahia, Brazil.

The specific name montanum is derived from the Latin adjective montanus, meaning mountainous, and refers to the high-elevation forest at the type locality.
