= Atractus dapsilis =

Scientific classification
- Kingdom: Animalia
- Phylum: Chordata
- Class: Reptilia
- Order: Squamata
- Suborder: Serpentes
- Family: Colubridae
- Genus: Atractus
- Species: A. dapsilis

Binomial name
- Atractus dapsilis Melo-Sampaio, Passos, Fouquet, Prudente & Torres-Carvajal, 2019

Species of snake

Atractus dapsilis is a species of snake in the family Colubridae. The species can be found in Brazil.
