= Areia, Paraíba =

Coordinates: 6.96278°S 35.6919°W

Areia
- Municipality
- Municipality of Areia
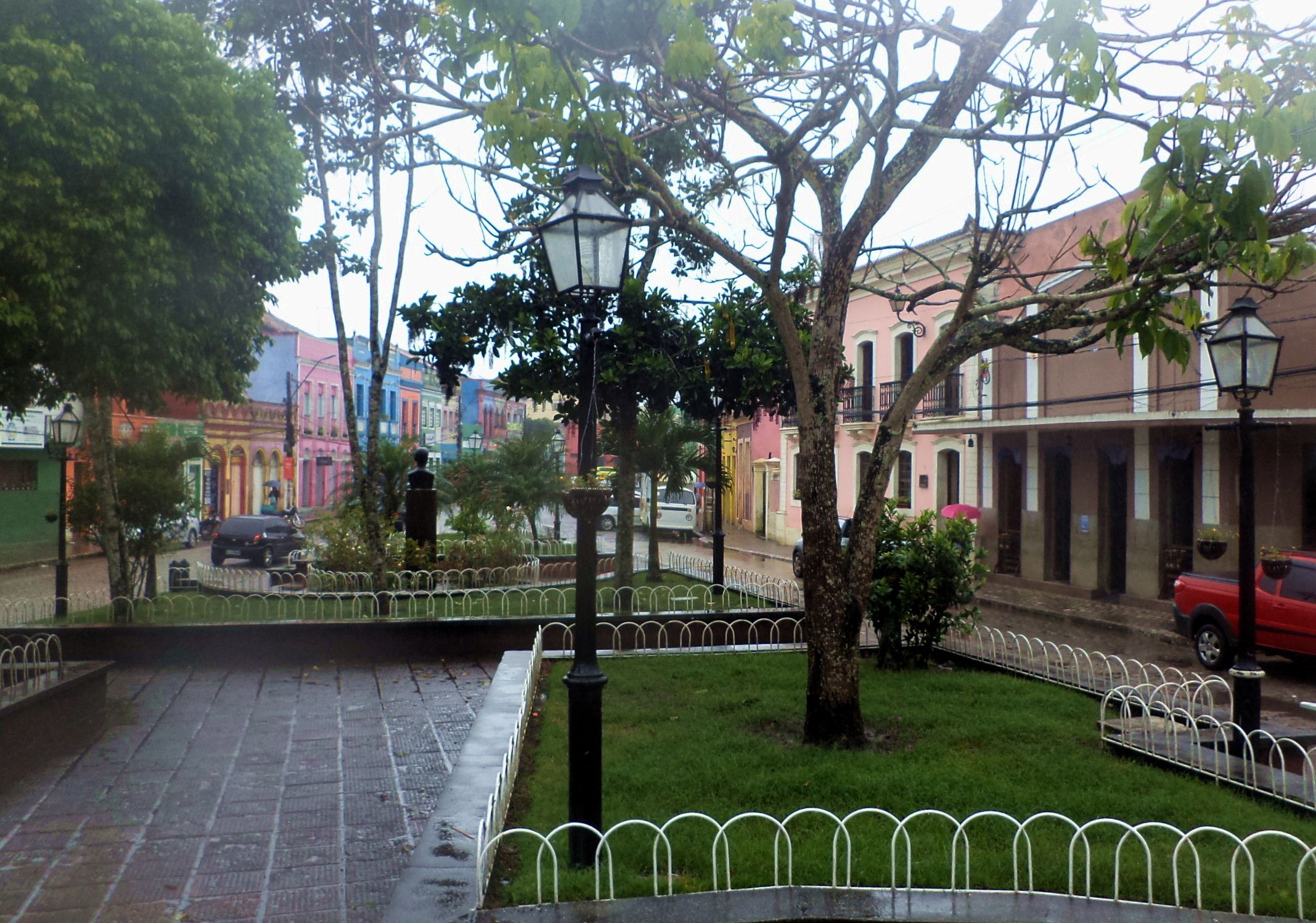
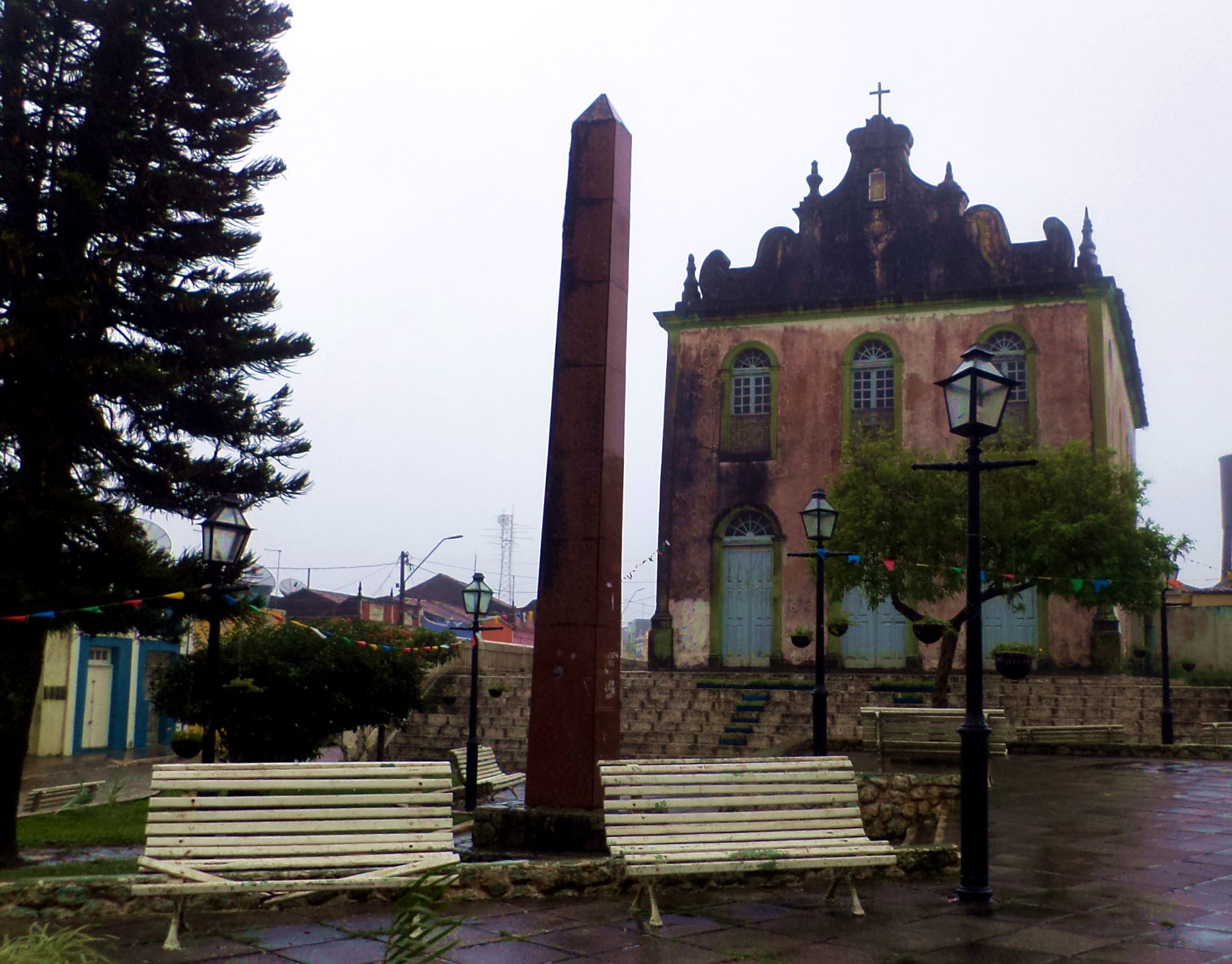
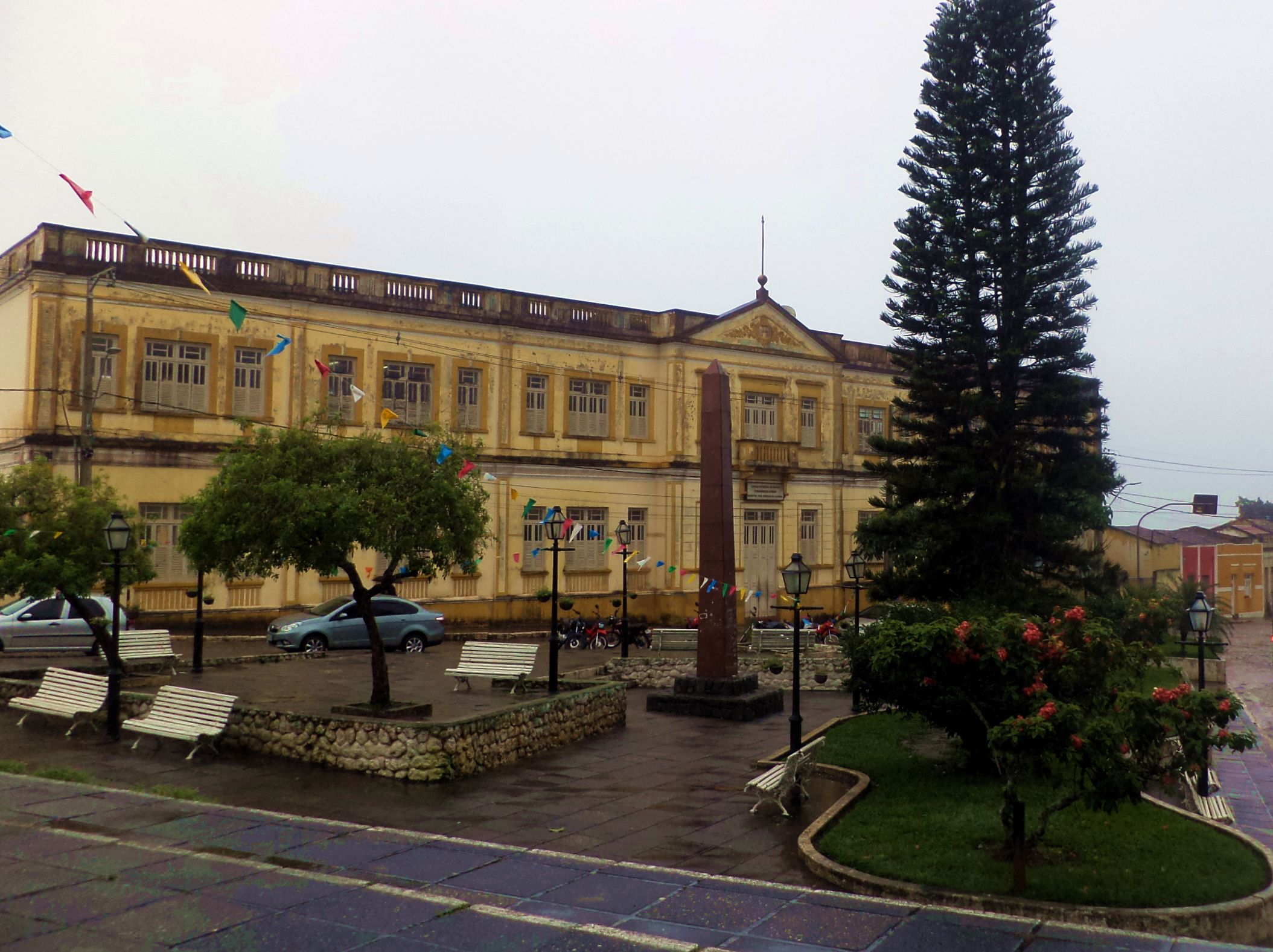
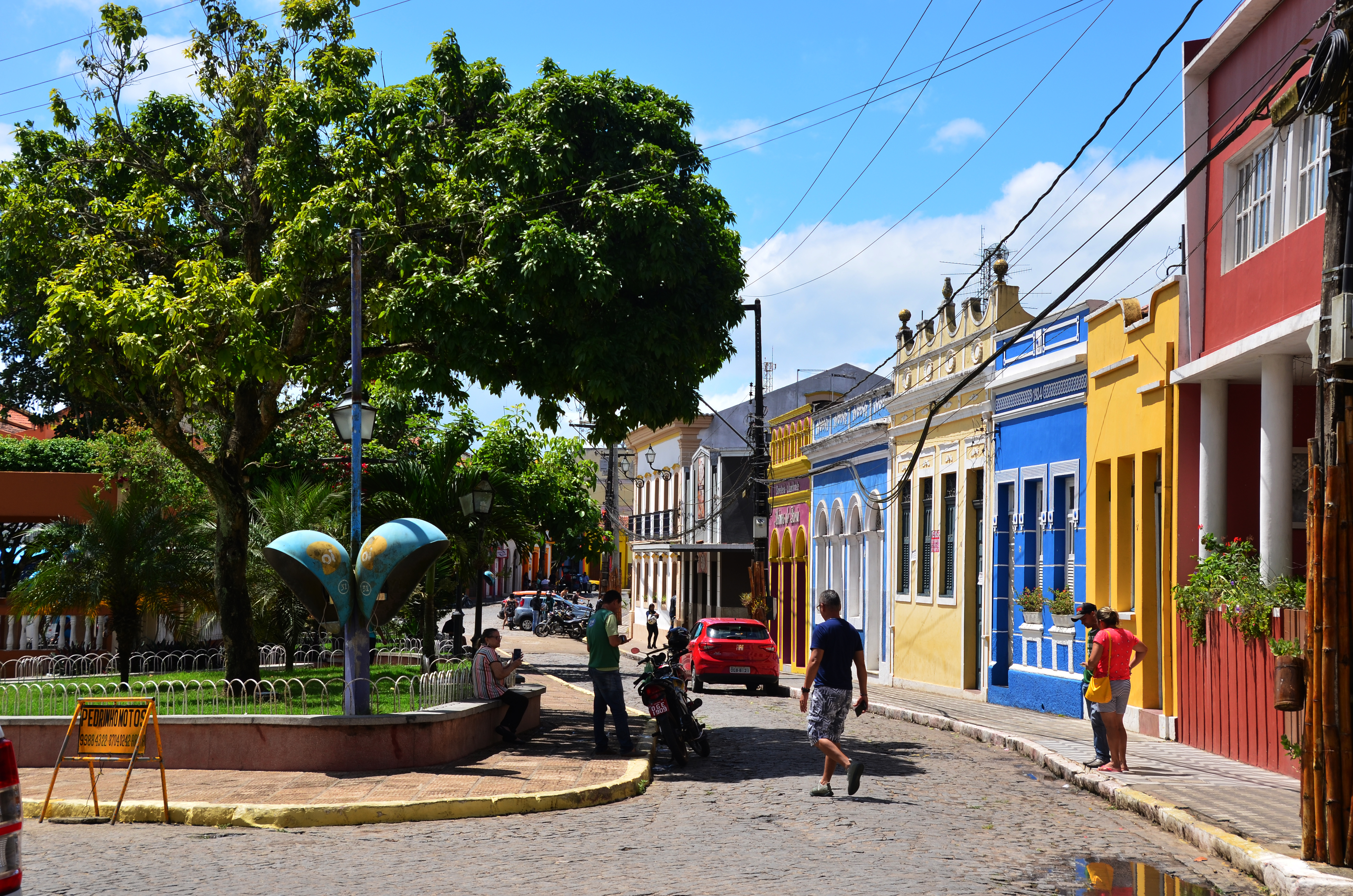
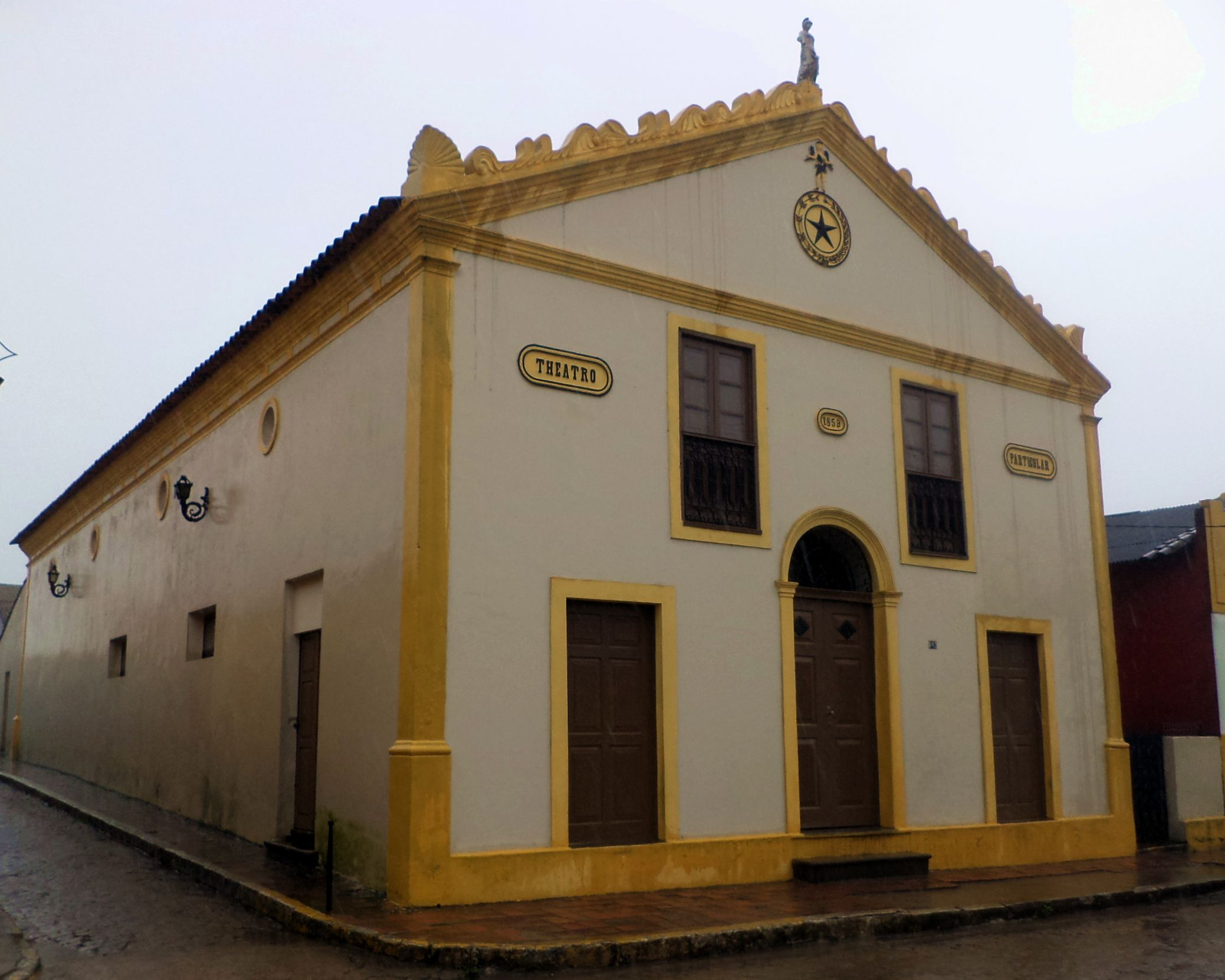
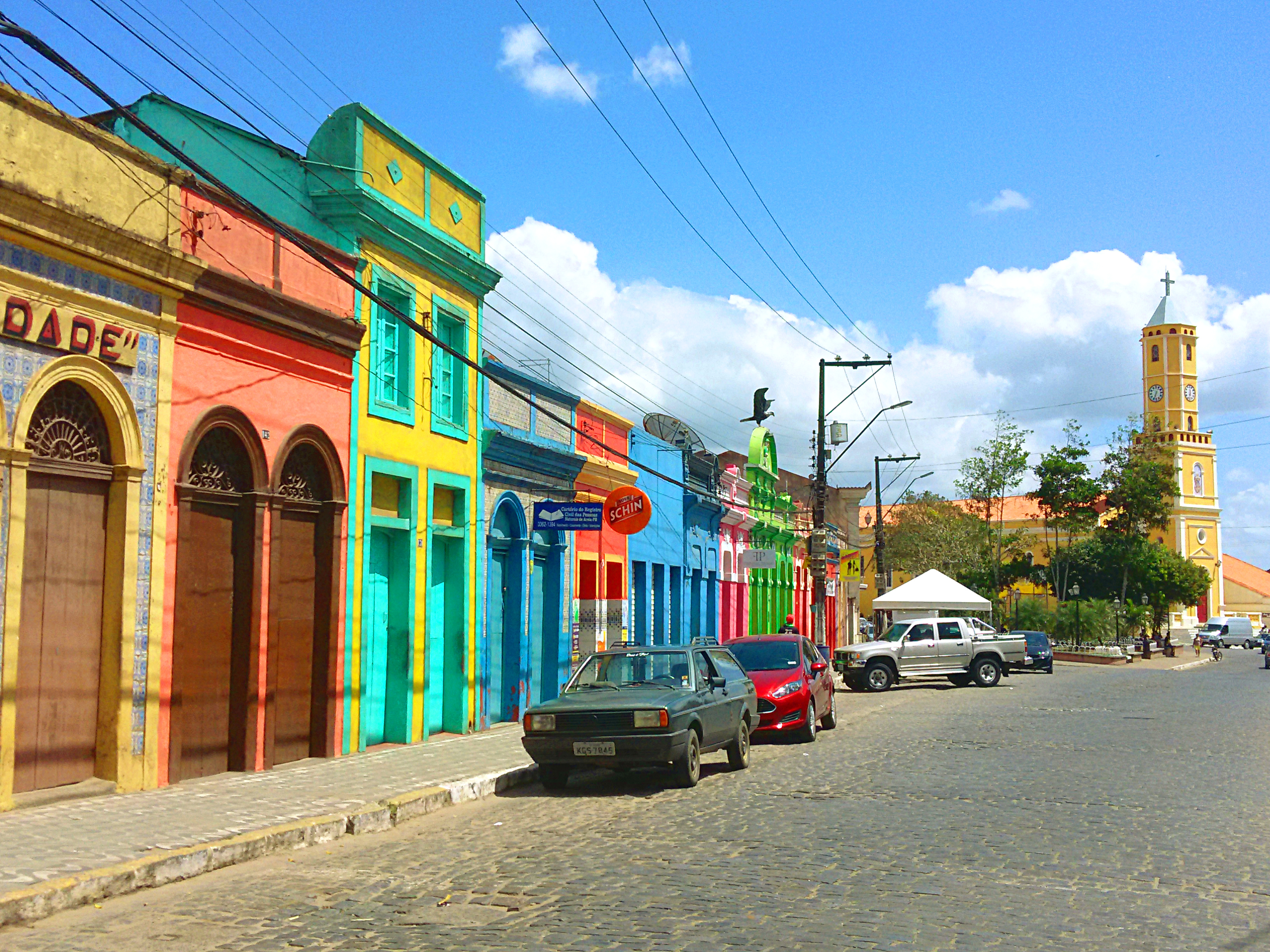

- Flag Coat of arms
- Motto: PUGNIS ROBORATUS
- Country: Brazil
- Region: Northeast
- State: Paraíba

Population (2020)
  - Total: 22,656
- Time zone: UTC−3 (BRT)
- Area code: 58397-000
- HDI (2010): 0.594 – low
- Website: areia.pb.gov.br

Areia (Central northeastern portuguese pronunciation: [ɐˈɾeˑɐ]) is a municipality in the state of Paraíba in the Northeast Region of Brazil.

== Climate ==
Climate data for Areia (1981–2010)
Month	Jan	Feb	Mar	Apr	May	Jun	Jul	Aug	Sep	Oct	Nov	Dec	Year
Mean daily maximum °C (°F)	29.1 (84.4)	29.1 (84.4)	28.6 (83.5)	27.6 (81.7)	26.5 (79.7)	24.7 (76.5)	24.3 (75.7)	24.7 (76.5)	26.3 (79.3)	28.3 (82.9)	29.0 (84.2)	29.5 (85.1)	27.3 (81.1)
Daily mean °C (°F)	23.5 (74.3)	23.7 (74.7)	23.7 (74.7)	23.3 (73.9)	22.6 (72.7)	21.3 (70.3)	20.6 (69.1)	20.6 (69.1)	21.4 (70.5)	22.5 (72.5)	23.1 (73.6)	23.5 (74.3)	22.5 (72.5)
Mean daily minimum °C (°F)	20.4 (68.7)	20.6 (69.1)	20.8 (69.4)	20.8 (69.4)	20.2 (68.4)	19.0 (66.2)	18.1 (64.6)	18.0 (64.4)	18.6 (65.5)	19.1 (66.4)	19.6 (67.3)	20.0 (68.0)	19.6 (67.3)
Average precipitation mm (inches)	83.0 (3.27)	107.4 (4.23)	156.3 (6.15)	151.7 (5.97)	169.2 (6.66)	210.7 (8.30)	182.2 (7.17)	151.2 (5.95)	60.9 (2.40)	21.8 (0.86)	27.5 (1.08)	37.8 (1.49)	1,359.7 (53.53)
Average precipitation days (≥ 1.0 mm)	8	9	12	14	16	18	17	14	9	4	4	6	131
Average relative humidity (%)	80.6	81.5	83.7	86.1	87.8	89.1	88.1	86.3	82.2	79.1	77.5	78.1	83.3
Mean monthly sunshine hours	198.6	175.0	176.2	143.8	153.5	119.5	143.1	162.0	169.4	225.1	231.5	205.1	2,102.8
Source: Instituto Nacional de Meteorologia

== See also ==
- List of municipalities in Paraíba
