= Kataphraktosaurus =

Scientific classification
- Kingdom: Animalia
- Phylum: Chordata
- Order: Squamata
- Family: Gymnophthalmidae
- Genus: Kataphraktosaurus; Rojas-Runjaic, Barrio-Amorós, Señaris, De la Riva, & Castroviejo-Fisher, 2021
- Species: K. ungerhamiltoni

Binomial name
- Kataphraktosaurus ungerhamiltoni Rojas-Runjaic, Barrio-Amorós, Señaris, De la Riva, & Castroviejo-Fisher, 2021

Genus of lizards

Kataphraktosaurus is a genus of the lizard family Gymnophthalmidae. The genus is monotypic, i.e. it has only one species, Kataphraktosaurus ungerhamiltoni. It occurs in Venezuela.
