= Atractus natans =

Conservation status
- Least Concern (IUCN 3.1)

Scientific classification
- Kingdom: Animalia
- Phylum: Chordata
- Class: Reptilia
- Order: Squamata
- Suborder: Serpentes
- Family: Colubridae
- Genus: Atractus
- Species: A. natans

Binomial name
- Atractus natans Hoogmoed & Prudente, 2003

Species of snake

Atractus natans is a species of snake in the family Colubridae. The species can be found in Brazil and Peru.
