= Imantodes guane =

Scientific classification
- Kingdom: Animalia
- Phylum: Chordata
- Class: Reptilia
- Order: Squamata
- Suborder: Serpentes
- Family: Colubridae
- Genus: Imantodes
- Species: I. guane

Binomial name
- Imantodes guane Missassi & Prudente, 2015

Species of snake

Imantodes guane is a species of snake in the family Colubridae. The species is native to Colombia.
