= Museu de História Natural Capão da Imbuia =

Natural history museum in Curitiba, Brazil

Coordinates: 25.4367°S 49.2191°W

- Museu de História Natural do Capão da Imbuia
- Location: Curitiba, Paraná, Brazil
- Type: Natural history museum
- Owner: Municipality of Curitiba

The Museu de História Natural Capão da Imbuia, also known as the Museu de História Natural do Capão da Imbuia and abbreviated MHNCI, is a natural history museum in Curitiba, Paraná, Brazil. It is a division of the Department of Research and Conservation of Fauna of the Municipal Environment Secretariat of the Curitiba city government.

The museum is located in the Capão da Imbuia neighborhood, in an area of remnant Araucaria forest. Its activities include zoological research, conservation, environmental education, and the maintenance of scientific collections related especially to the fauna of Paraná.
