= Erythrolamprus rochai =

Scientific classification
- Kingdom: Animalia
- Phylum: Chordata
- Class: Reptilia
- Order: Squamata
- Suborder: Serpentes
- Family: Colubridae
- Genus: Erythrolamprus
- Species: E. rochai

Binomial name
- Erythrolamprus rochai Ascenso, Costa, & Prudente, 2019

Species of snake

Erythrolamprus rochai is a species of snake in the family Colubridae. The species is found in Brazil.
