= Amerotyphlops illusorium =

Scientific classification
- Kingdom: Animalia
- Phylum: Chordata
- Class: Reptilia
- Order: Squamata
- Suborder: Serpentes
- Family: Typhlopidae
- Genus: Amerotyphlops
- Species: A. illusorium

Binomial name
- Amerotyphlops illusorium Graboski, Arredondo, Grazziotin, Guerra-Fuentes, Silva, Prudente, Pinto, Rodrigues, Bonatto & Zaher, 2022

Species of snake

Amerotyphlops illusorium is a species of blind snake in the family Typhlopidae. It is endemic to Brazil, where it is known from Bahia. The species was described from specimens collected near Trancoso, Bahia.

== Taxonomy ==
Amerotyphlops illusorium was described by Roberta Graboski, Juan C. Arredondo, Felipe G. Grazziotin, Ricardo Arturo Guerra-Fuentes, Ariane A. A. da Silva, Ana Lúcia da Costa Prudente, Roberta R. Pinto, Miguel Trefaut Rodrigues, Sandro L. Bonatto and Hussam Zaher. The holotype is an adult female, MZUSP 18787, collected on 26 March 2007 at Fazenda Nova Alegria, in the municipality of Trancoso, Bahia, Brazil.

The specific name illusorium is derived from the Latin illusorius, meaning illusory or ironic, in reference to the species' external similarity to Amerotyphlops brongersmianus.
