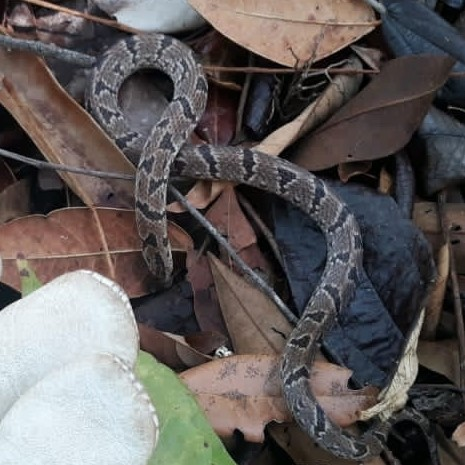

Scientific classification
- Kingdom: Animalia
- Phylum: Chordata
- Class: Reptilia
- Order: Squamata
- Suborder: Serpentes
- Family: Colubridae
- Genus: Atractus
- Species: A. tartarus

Binomial name
- Atractus tartarus Passos, Prudente, & Lynch, 2016

= Atractus tartarus =

Species of snake

Atractus tartarus is a species of snake in the family Colubridae. The species can be found in Brazil.
