= Pseudoboa serrana =

Conservation status
- Least Concern (IUCN 3.1)

Scientific classification
- Kingdom: Animalia
- Phylum: Chordata
- Class: Reptilia
- Order: Squamata
- Suborder: Serpentes
- Family: Colubridae
- Genus: Pseudoboa
- Species: P. serrana

Binomial name
- Pseudoboa serrana Morato, Moura-Leite, Prudente & Bérnils, 1995

Species of snake

Pseudoboa serrana is a species of snake of the family Colubridae.

== Geographic range ==
The snake is found in Brazil.
