= Atractus hoogmoedi =

Conservation status
- Critically Endangered (IUCN 3.1)

Scientific classification
- Kingdom: Animalia
- Phylum: Chordata
- Class: Reptilia
- Order: Squamata
- Suborder: Serpentes
- Family: Colubridae
- Genus: Atractus
- Species: A. hoogmoedi

Binomial name
- Atractus hoogmoedi Prudente & Passos, 2010

Species of snake

Atractus hoogmoedi is a species of snake in the family Colubridae. The species can be found in Brazil.
