= Pseudogonatodes quihuai =

Scientific classification
- Kingdom: Animalia
- Phylum: Chordata
- Class: Reptilia
- Order: Squamata
- Suborder: Gekkota
- Family: Sphaerodactylidae
- Genus: Pseudogonatodes
- Species: P. quihuai

Binomial name
- Pseudogonatodes quihuai Rojas-Runjaic, Koch, Castroviejo-Fisher & Prudente, 2024

Species of gecko

Pseudogonatodes quihuai is a species of gecko in the family Sphaerodactylidae. It is endemic to Venezuela, where it is known from the eastern slope of the Cordillera de Mérida in Barinas. The species was described in 2024 from specimens collected near Altamira de Cáceres, in Bolívar municipality.

== Taxonomy ==
Pseudogonatodes quihuai was described by Fernando J. M. Rojas-Runjaic, Claudia Koch, Santiago Castroviejo-Fisher and Ana Lúcia da Costa Prudente in 2024. The holotype is an adult female, MHNLS 21643, collected on 15 February 2015 at El Potrerito, about 2.2 km (1.4 mi) northwest of Altamira de Cáceres, Bolívar municipality, Barinas, Venezuela.

The specific name quihuai honors José Daniel Quihua Ramírez, a Venezuelan naturalist and wildlife photographer who collected the type specimens.
