= Atractus akerios =

Scientific classification
- Kingdom: Animalia
- Phylum: Chordata
- Class: Reptilia
- Order: Squamata
- Suborder: Serpentes
- Family: Colubridae
- Genus: Atractus
- Species: A. akerios

Binomial name
- Atractus akerios Melo‐Sampaio, Passos, Prudente, Venegas, & Torres‐Carvajal, 2021

Species of snake

Atractus akerios is a species of snake in the family Colubridae. The species can be found in Brazil.
