= Atractus pachacamac =

Scientific classification
- Kingdom: Animalia
- Phylum: Chordata
- Class: Reptilia
- Order: Squamata
- Suborder: Serpentes
- Family: Colubridae
- Genus: Atractus
- Species: A. pachacamac

Binomial name
- Atractus pachacamac Melo‐Sampaio, Passos, Prudente, Venegas & Torres‐Carvajal, 2021

Species of snake

Atractus pachacamac, also known commonly as the Pachacamac ground snake, is a species of snake in the family Colubridae. The species can be found in Ecuador, Peru, and Colombia.

== Etymology ==
The specific name, pachacamac, is from the Quechua word for the Incan creator of the earth.
