= Atractus trefauti =

Scientific classification
- Kingdom: Animalia
- Phylum: Chordata
- Class: Reptilia
- Order: Squamata
- Suborder: Serpentes
- Family: Colubridae
- Genus: Atractus
- Species: A. trefauti

Binomial name
- Atractus trefauti Melo-Sampaio, Passos, Fouquet, Costa-Prudente, & Torres-Carvajal, 2019

Species of snake

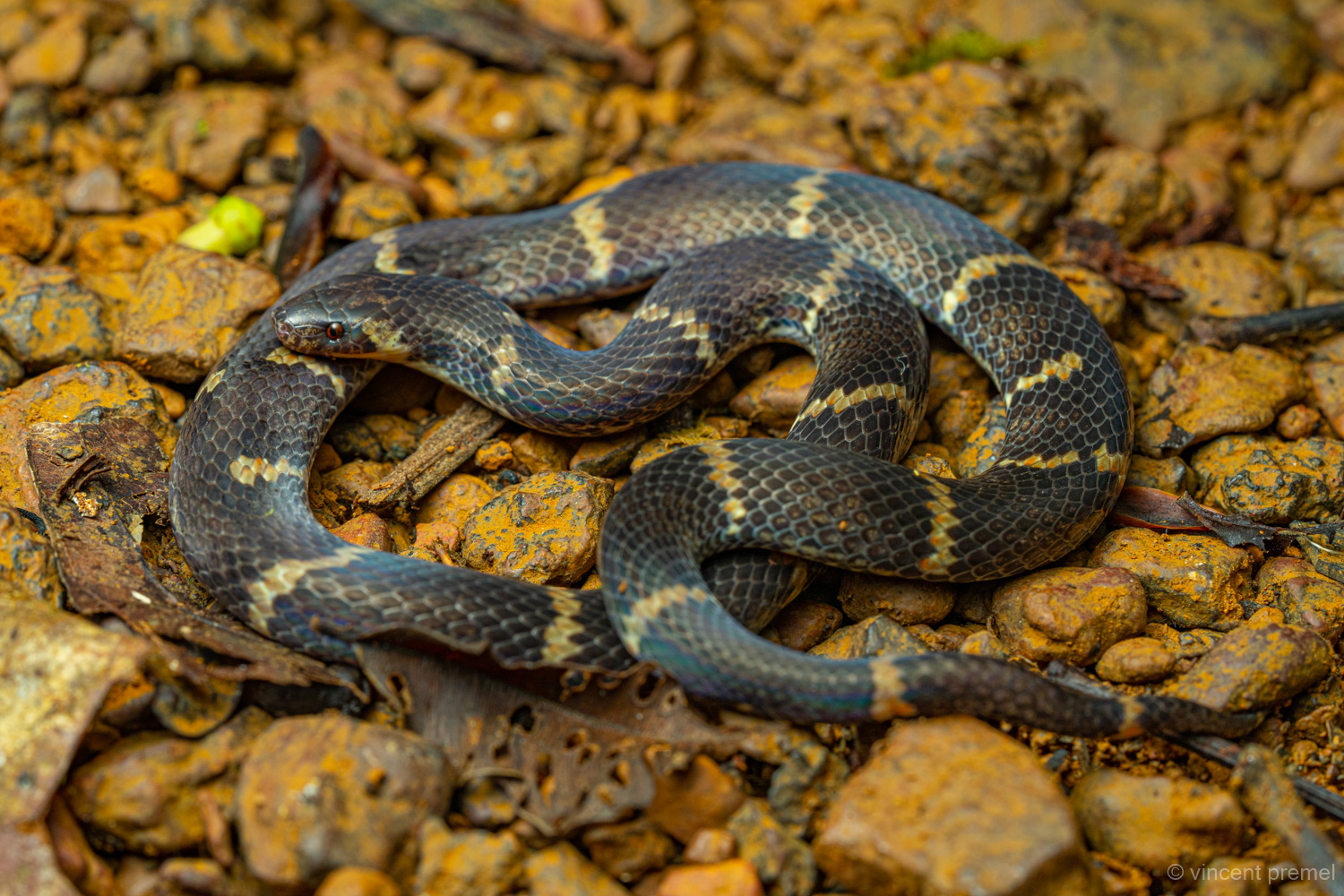
Atractus trefauti

Atractus trefauti is a species of snake in the family Colubridae. The species can be found in French Guiana and Brazil.
