= Federal University of Uberlândia =

Public university in Brazil

Coordinates: 18°55′7″S 48°15′28″W

- Universidade Federal de Uberlândia
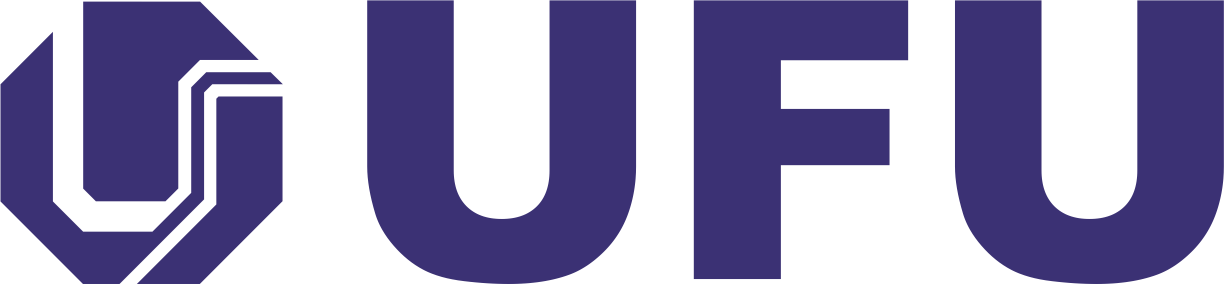
- Other names: UFU
- Motto: Um bem público a serviço do Brasil (Portuguese)
- Motto in English: A public good in the service of Brazil
- Type: Public university
- Established: August 14, 1969 (granted university status as a federation of faculties)
- Rector: Valder Steffen Júnior
- Academic staff: 1,900
- Administrative staff: 3,200
- Students: 24,500
- Undergraduates: 14,530 (2005)
- Postgraduates: 2,000 (2005)
- Location: Uberlândia, Ituiutaba, Monte Carmelo and Patos de Minas, Minas Gerais, Brazil
- Campus: Urban
- Colors: Blue and white
- Website: www.ufu.br

The Federal University of Uberlândia (Portuguese: Universidade Federal de Uberlândia, UFU) is a Brazilian public university, located in the southwest of Minas Gerais, in Uberlândia, Brazil. The students are admitted through both annual exams, the vestibular, and the National High School Exam.

As of 2014, UFU offers 55 undergraduate degrees, including a sought-after Medicine degree, Law, Economics, plus Engineering, Business, Science and Art degrees. It offers 19 doctorate programs, 38 master's degree programs, 34 diplomas and 21 medical residence programs.

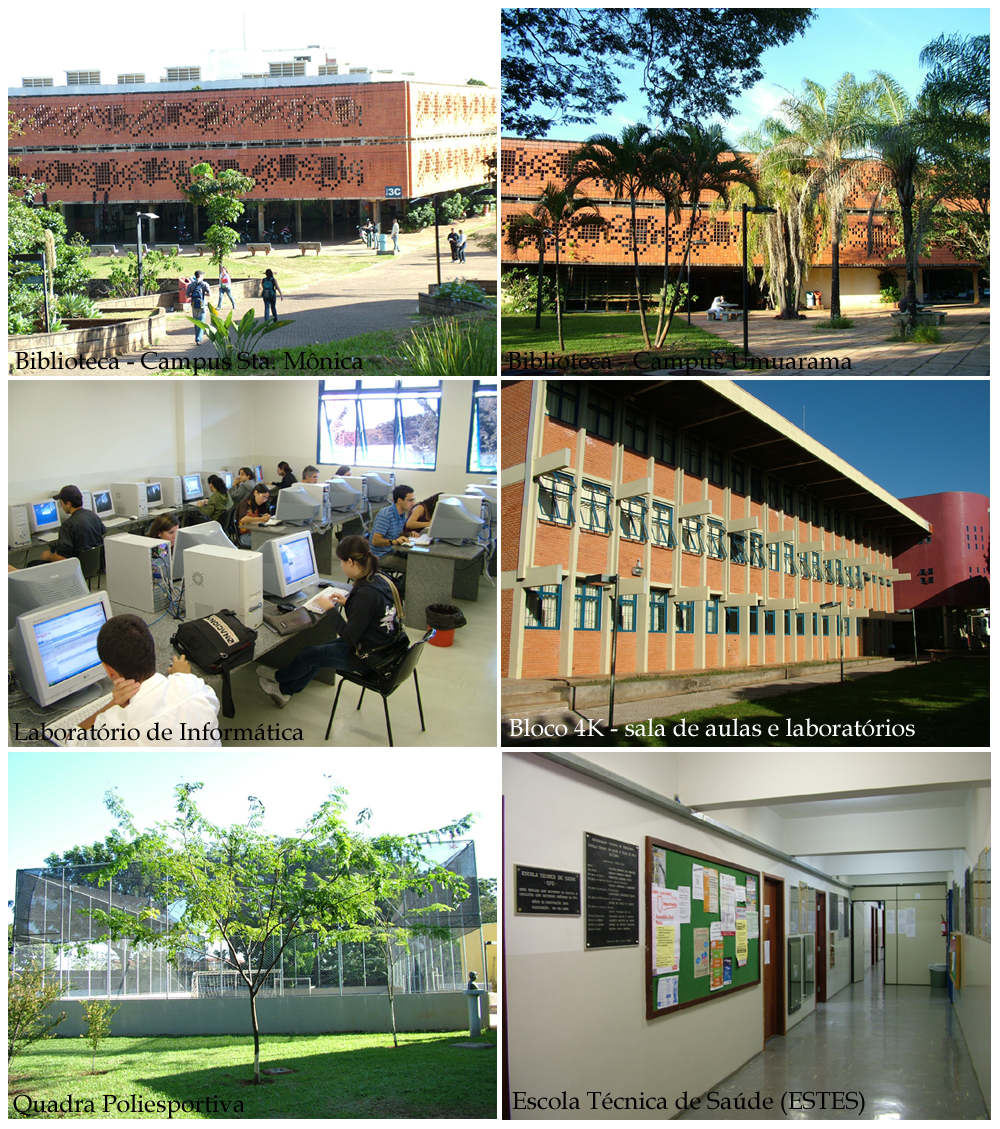

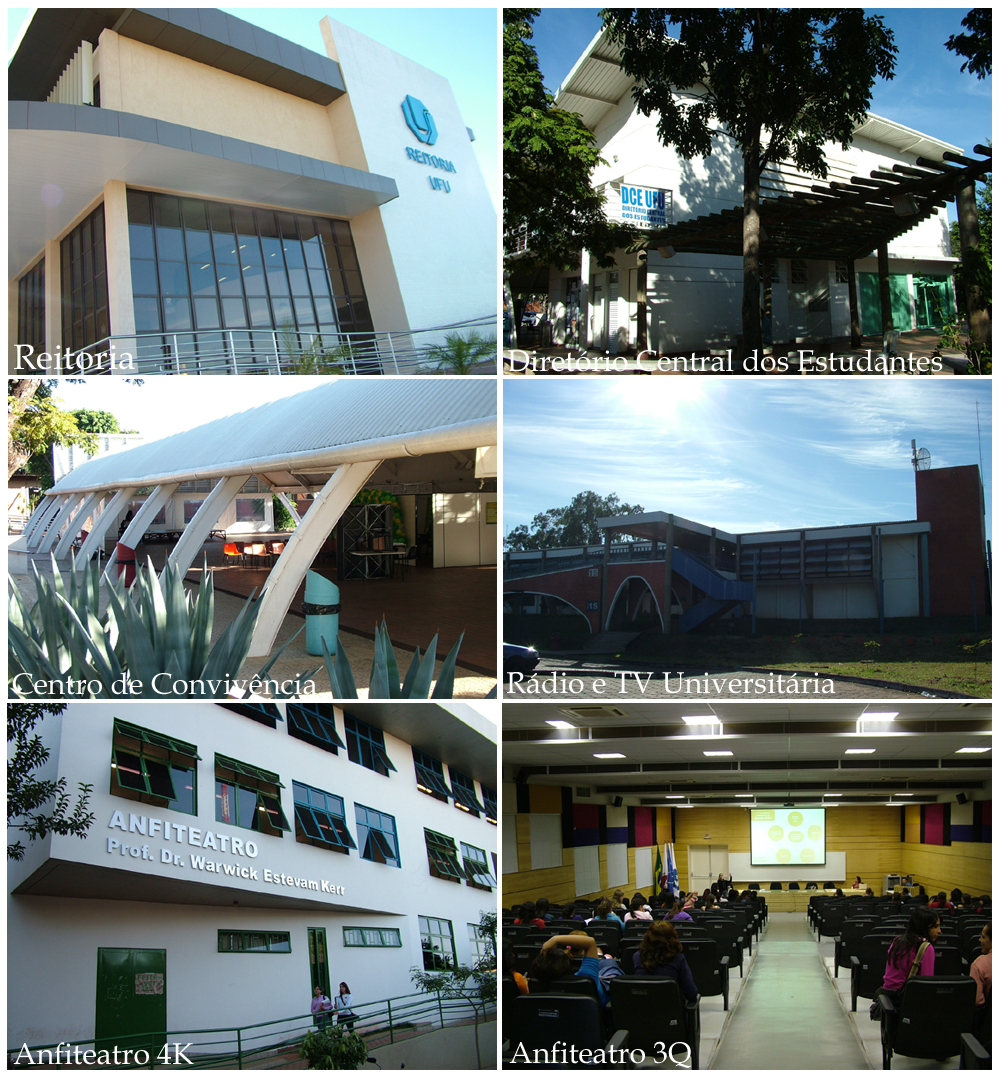

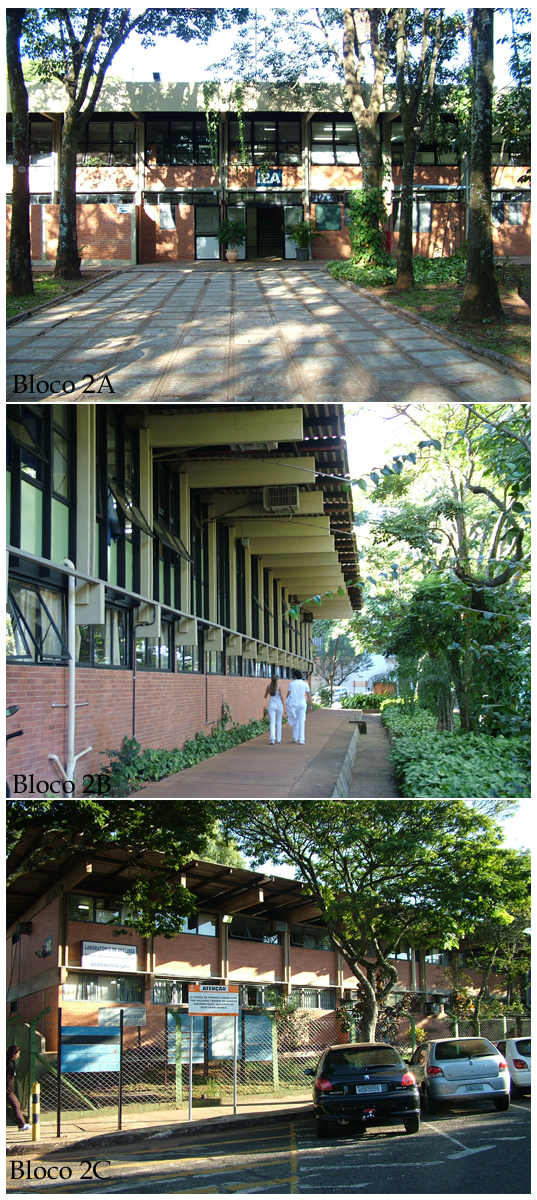

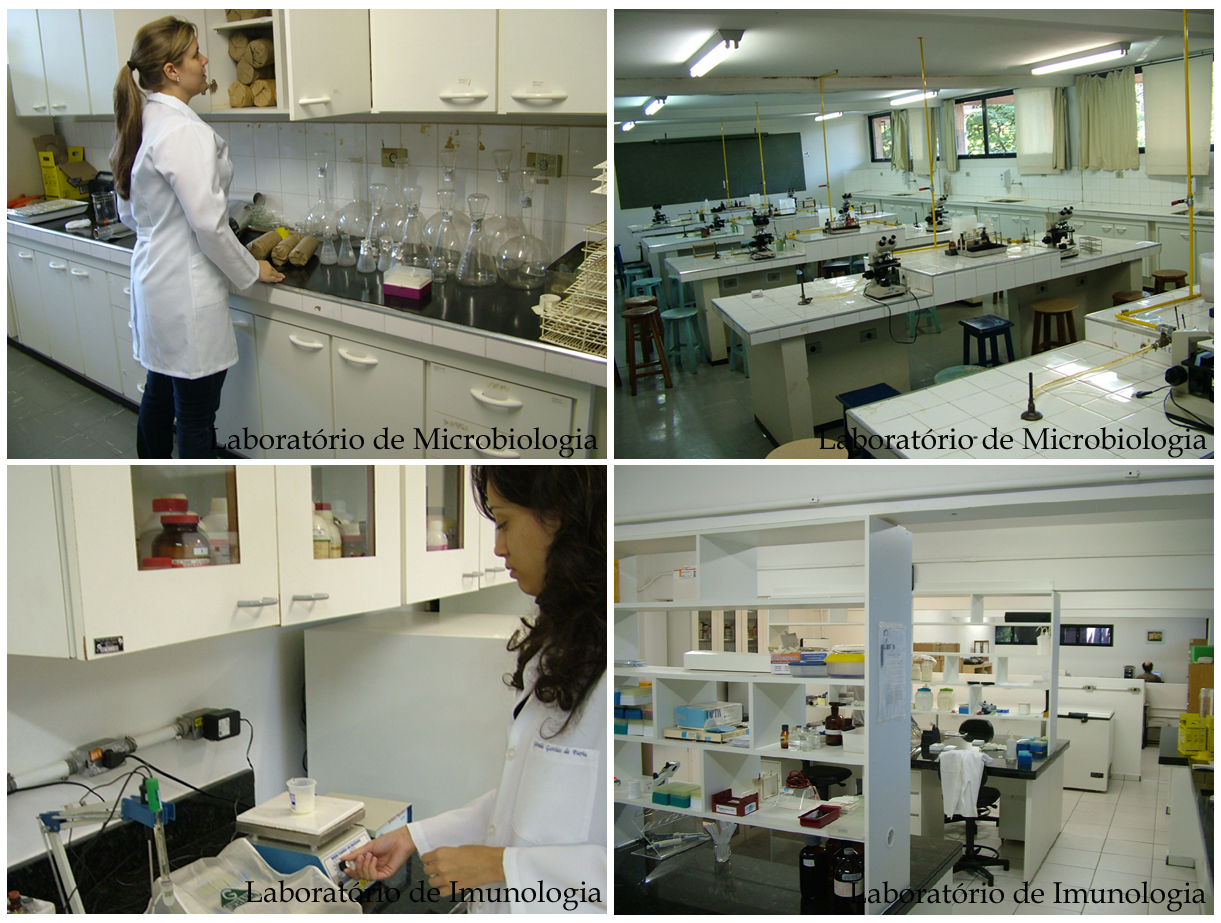

== History ==
The first colleges were established in 1960s. At August 14, 1969, the Faculty of Law (founded in 1960), Faculty of Philosophy, Science and Languages (founded in 1960), Faculty of Engineering (founded in 1961) and Faculty of Economics (founded in 1963) were united to build the University of Uberlândia (UnU) with the Brazilian Government confirmation by the decree-law nº 762. On May 24, 1978, University of Uberlândia became the Federal University of Uberlândia by the Law N. 6532.

== Rankings and reputation ==
University rankings

Global – Overall
- THE World: 1001+ (2019)
- USNWR Global: 1182 (2019)

At the national level, in recent years the Federal University of Uberlândia comes to be one of the twenty best public universities of Brazil. Nowadays, it is at the 13th position of the 106 national public universities.

== See also ==
- Brazil University Rankings
- List of federal universities of Brazil
- Universities and Higher Education in Brazil
