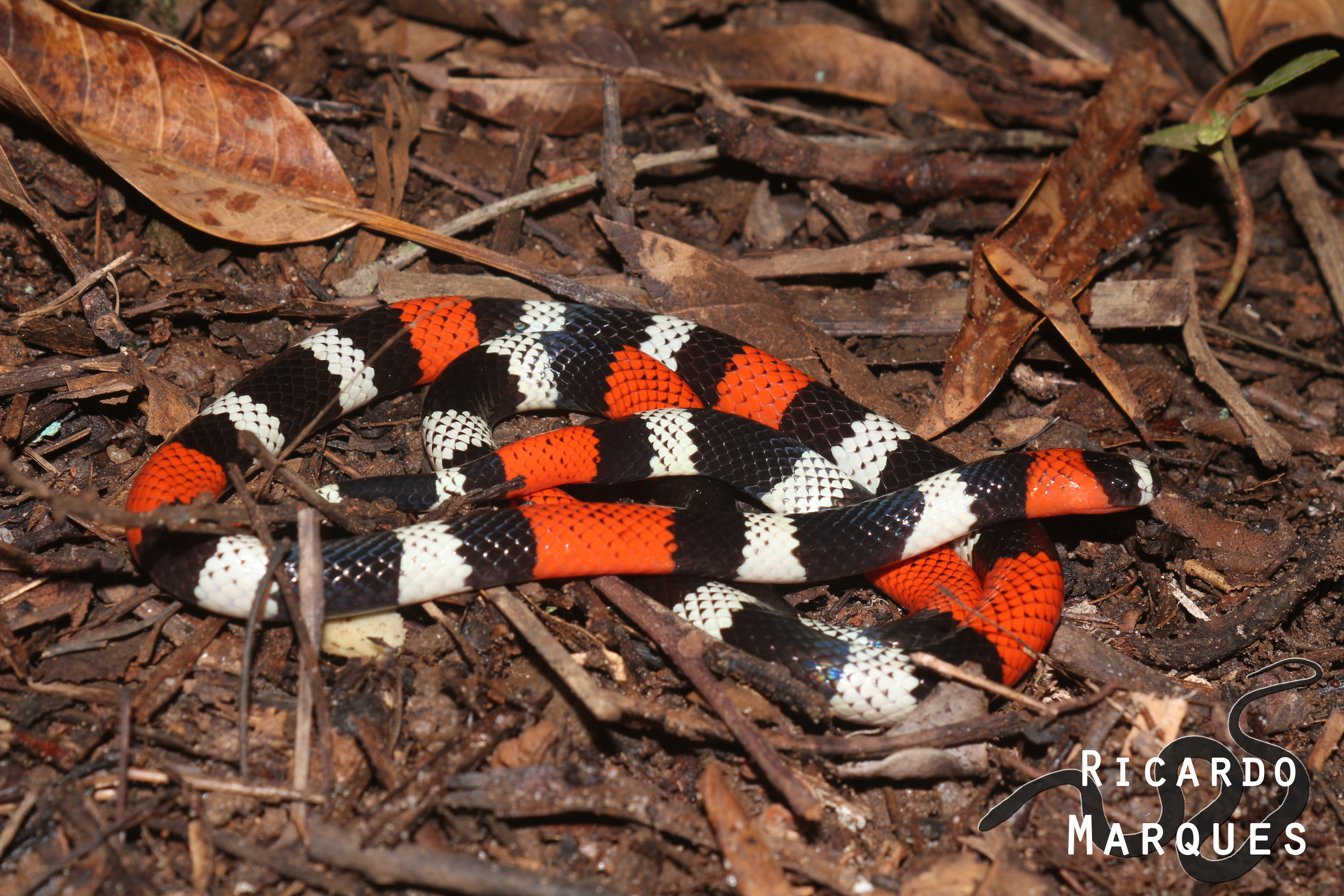

Conservation status
- Data Deficient (IUCN 3.1)

Scientific classification
- Kingdom: Animalia
- Phylum: Chordata
- Class: Reptilia
- Order: Squamata
- Suborder: Serpentes
- Family: Elapidae
- Genus: Micrurus
- Species: M. ibiboboca

Binomial name
- Micrurus ibiboboca (Merrem, 1820)
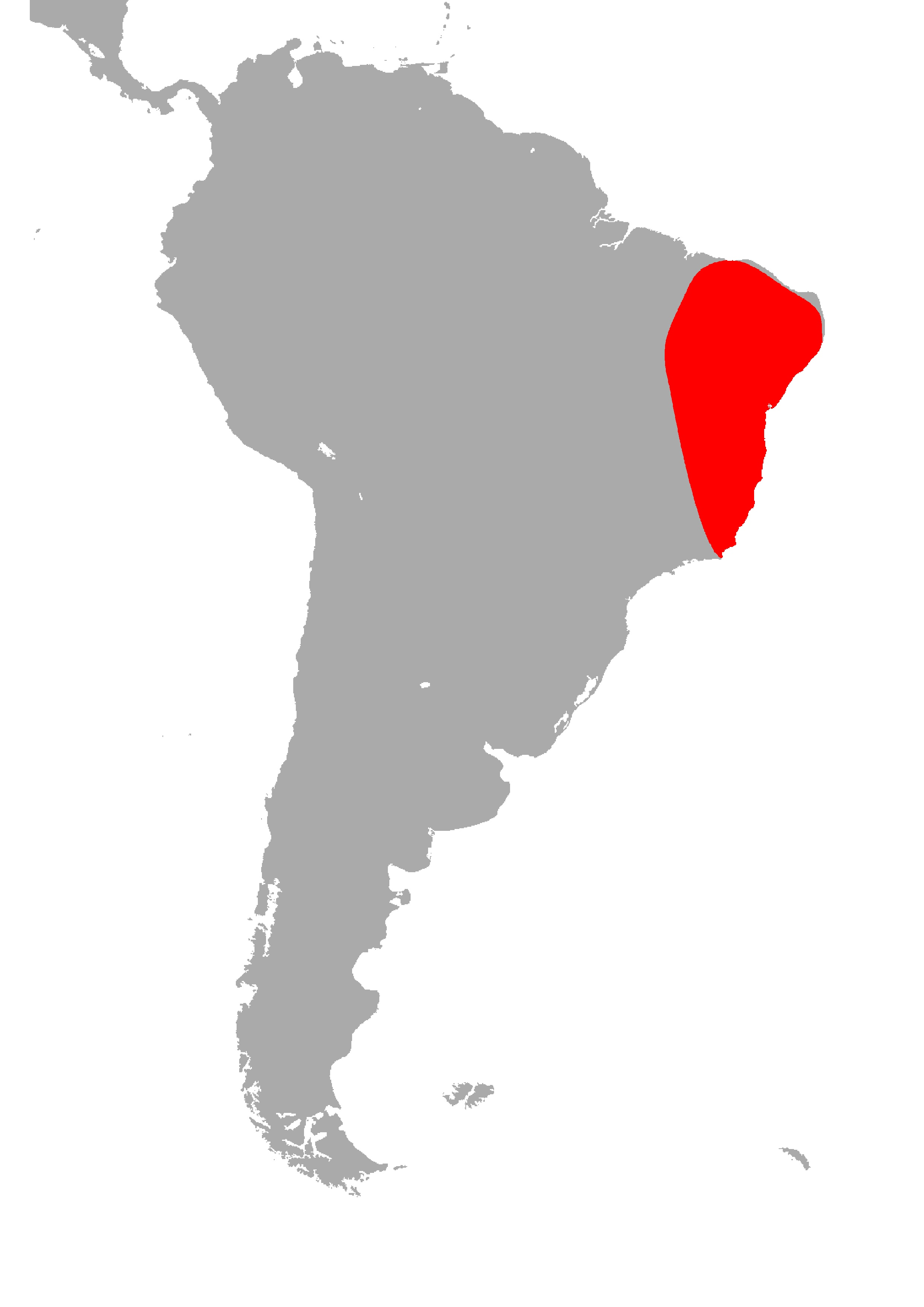

Synonyms
- Elaps ibiboboca Merrem, 1820; Micrurus lemniscatus ibiboboca (Merrem, 1820); Elaps marcgravii Wied-Neuwied, 1820; Elaps gravenhorstii Boulenger, 1896

= Micrurus ibiboboca =

Species of snake

Micrurus ibiboboca, also known commonly as the caatinga coral snake and the ibiboboca in Brazil, is a species of venomous snake in the family Elapidae. The species is native to eastern Brazil, south of the Amazon. It is often confused with the widespread species Micrurus lemniscatus.

== Etymology ==
The specific name, ibiboboca, is the local common name for this species of coral snake. The word is neither Latin nor Portuguese, but rather from an indigenous language.

== Description ==
Large for the genus Micrurus, adults of Micrurus ibiboboca usually have a total length (tail included) of 0.70–0.85 m (2.3–2.8 ft), but the maximum recorded total length is 1.33 m (4.4 ft).

Like most coral snakes M. ibiboboca has a color pattern of red, black, and white (or yellow) rings. The black rings are arranged in triads. Each triad contains three black rings and two alternating white rings. The white rings are about as wide as the black rings. The red rings, which are between the triads, are narrower than the triads, but wider than the individual black or white rings.

== Geographic distribution ==
Micrurus ibiboboca is found in the Brazilian states of Alagoas, Bahia, Ceará, Maranhão, Minas Gerais, Paraíba, Pernambuco, Piauí, Rio Grande do Norte, Rio de Janeiro, and Sergipe.

== Habitat ==
The preferred natural habitats of Micrurus ibiboboca are forest, savanna, and shrubland, at elevations from near sea level to approximately 1,200 m (3,900 ft).

== Behavior ==
Micrurus ibiboboca is terrestrial and semifossorial, and it is both diurnal and nocturnal.

== Diet ==
Micrurus ibiboboca preys upon a wide variety of elongate poikilotherms, including caecilians such as Siphonops annulatus, amphisbaenids such as Amphisbaena vermicularis and Leposternon polystegum, and snakes such as Dipsas mikanii and even its own species.

== Reproduction ==
Micrurus ibiboboca is oviparous. Clutch size is 1–5 eggs.
