= Hussam Zaher =

Brazilian herpetologist (born 1965)

Hussam El Dine Zaher
- Born: September 17, 1965 (age 60)
- Education: Colégio Pedro II; Université Pierre et Marie Curie; Muséum national d’histoire naturelle
- Known for: Systematics and evolution of reptiles; studies on the origin and evolution of snakes
- Scientific career
- Fields: Herpetology, Paleontology
- Workplaces: Museu de Zoologia da Universidade de São Paulo; Universidade de São Paulo; Universidade Estadual Paulista

Hussam El Dine Zaher (born 17 September 1965) is a Brazilian biologist and paleontologist.

== Biography ==
Zaher began his studies in 1985 at the Faculty of Humanities of Colégio Pedro II in Rio de Janeiro, graduating in 1989 with a bachelor's degree in biological sciences. In 1990, under the supervision of Alain Dubois, he obtained a master's degree in vertebrate evolution at the Université Pierre et Marie Curie in Paris, with the thesis La musculature adductrice de la mandibule de quelques Xenodontinae et ses implications phylogénétiques (serpentes: Colubridae). In 1994, also under Dubois, he received his Ph.D. from the Muséum national d’histoire naturelle with the dissertation Phylogenie des Pseudoboini et evolution des Xenodontinae sud-americains (Serpentes, Colubridae).

From 1997 to 1998, Zaher pursued postdoctoral studies at the Museu Nacional da Universidade Federal do Rio de Janeiro and at the American Museum of Natural History. In 2004, he completed his habilitation with the thesis Contribuições em anatomia, sistemática e paleontologia de Serpentes. That same year, he was appointed associate professor at the Museu de Zoologia da Universidade de São Paulo (MZUSP), where he curates the herpetological and paleontological collections and directs graduate studies in zoology at both the Universidade de São Paulo and the Universidade Estadual Paulista in Rio Claro.

Zaher has served as a research associate at the Muséum national d’histoire naturelle and the American Museum of Natural History. He has been a council member of the Sociedade Brasileira de Zoologia, advisor to the Regional Library of Medicine (BIREME) and the Pan American Health Organization/World Health Organization (PAHO/WHO), and scientific coordinator of the SciELO Biodiversity virtual library program. He has also been editor of the journals Papéis Avulsos de Zoologia, Arquivos de Zoologia, and South American Journal of Herpetology. At MZUSP, he was head of the Boracéia Biological Station (2003), head of the Vertebrate Department, Director of the Department of Cultural Outreach, and from 2009 to 2013, Director of the museum.

His research focuses on the systematics and evolutionary patterns of reptiles, particularly the origin and evolution of snakes.

In addition to numerous extant reptiles and amphibians, Zaher, together with his colleague Krister T. Smith of the Senckenberg Gesellschaft für Naturforschung, described the extinct genus Messelopython in 2020, which represents the oldest known python fossil.
