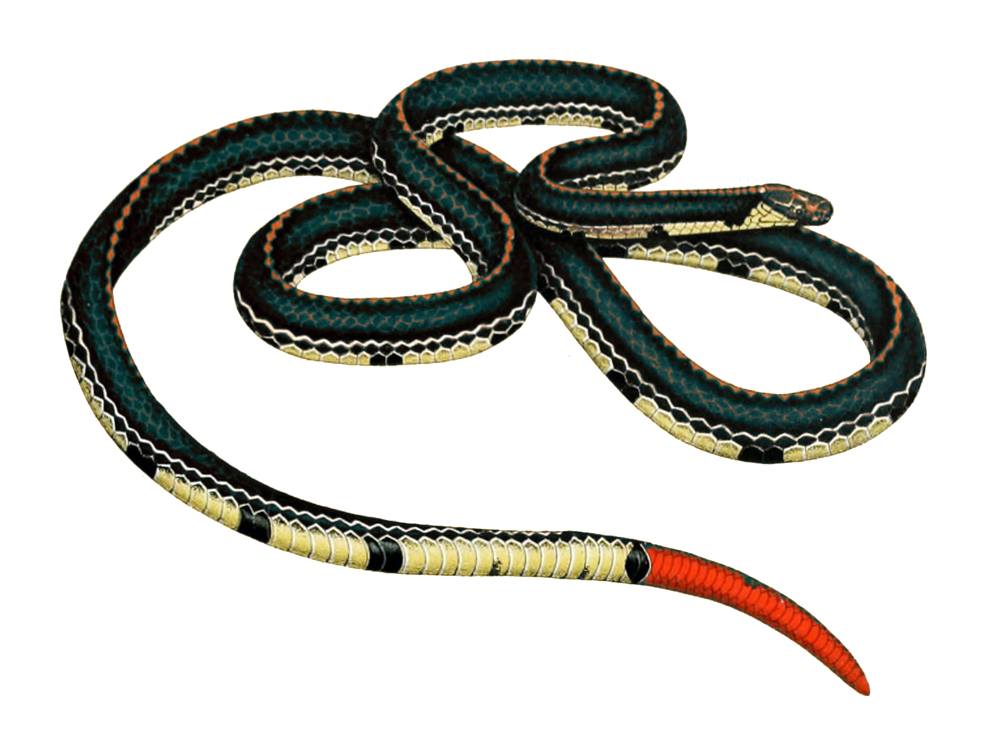
- Calliophis intestinalis

Scientific classification
- Domain: Eukaryota
- Kingdom: Animalia
- Phylum: Chordata
- Class: Reptilia
- Order: Squamata
- Suborder: Serpentes
- Family: Elapidae
- Subfamily: Elapinae
- Genus: Calliophis; Gray, 1834

Synonyms
- Elaps Wagler, 1830 (part); Callophis [sic] Günther, 1859

= Calliophis =

Genus of snakes

Calliophis is a genus of elapid snakes, one of several known commonly as oriental coral snakes or Asian coral snakes.

== Species ==
Species in this genus are:

- Calliophis beddomei (M.A. Smith, 1943) – Beddome's coral snake (India)
- Calliophis bibroni (Jan, 1858) – Bibron's coral snake (India)
- Calliophis bilineatus (Peters, 1881) – Two-stripped coral snake (Philippines)
- Calliophis bivirgatus (F. Boie, 1827) – Blue Malaysian coral snake (Indonesia, Cambodia, Malaysia, Singapore, Thailand)
- Calliophis castoe E.N. Smith, Ogale, Deepak & Giri, 2012 – Castoe’s coral snake (India)
- Calliophis gracilis Gray, 1835 – Spotted coral snake (Thailand, Malaysia, Indonesia, Singapore)
- Calliophis haematoetron E.N. Smith, Manamendra-Arachchi & Somweera, 2008 – Blood-bellied coral snake (Sri Lanka)
- Calliophis intestinalis (Laurenti, 1768) – Banded Malaysian coral snake (Indonesia, Malaysia)
- Calliophis maculiceps (Günther, 1858) – Speckled coral snake (Myanmar, Thailand, Malaysia, Vietnam, Cambodia, Laos)
- Calliophis melanurus (Shaw, 1802) – Slender coral snake, Indian coral snake (India, Bangladesh, Sri Lanka)
- Calliophis nigrescens (Günther, 1862) – Black coral snake (India)
- Calliophis nigrotaeniatus (Peters, 1863) – banded Malaysian coral snake, striped coral snake (Indonesia, Malaysia )
- Calliophis philippinus (Günther, 1864) – Philippine coral snake (the Philippines)
- Calliophis salitan Brown, Smart, Leviton, & Smith, 2018 – Dinagat Island banded coral snake (the Philippines)
- Calliophis suluensis (Steindachner, 1891) – Sulu Islands banded coral snake (the Philippines)

Nota bene: A binomial authority in parentheses indicates that the species was originally described in a genus other than Calliophis.

== Taxonomy ==
The former Calliophis calligaster, the barred coral snake (Philippines), is now in the genus Hemibungarus.

Both Kellogg's coral snake (formerly C. kelloggi ) (Vietnam, Laos, China) and MacClelland's coral snake (formerly C. macclellandi ) are now in the genus Sinomicrurus.

== Behaviour ==
Snakes of the genus Calliophis are semifossorial.
