= Sinomicrurus iwasakii =

Scientific classification
- Kingdom: Animalia
- Phylum: Chordata
- Class: Reptilia
- Order: Squamata
- Suborder: Serpentes
- Family: Elapidae
- Genus: Sinomicrurus
- Species: S. iwasakii

Binomial name
- Sinomicrurus iwasakii (Maki, 1935)

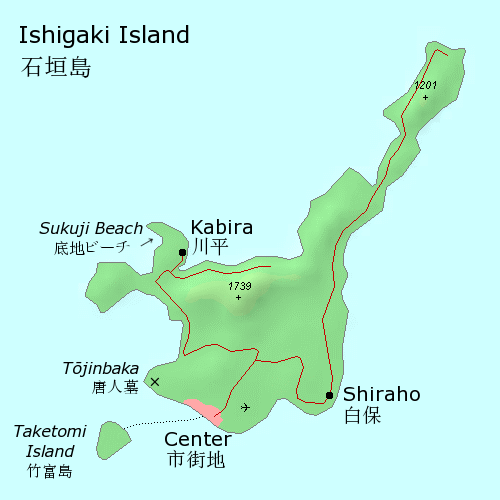

Synonyms
- Calliophis iwasakii Maki, 1935; Micrurus macclellandi iwasakii Welch, 1994:85; Calliophis macclellandi iwasakii Staniszewski, 2003; Sinomicrurus macclellandi iwasakii Goris & Maeda, 2004:247; Sinomicrurus macclellandi iwasakii Nguyen et al., 2009; Sinomicrurus iwasakii NCBI, 2021; Sinomicrurus iwasakii Smart et al., 2021

Species of snake

Sinomicrurus iwasakii, the Iwasaki's temperate Asian coralsnake, is a rare species of coral snake from the Ishigaki and Iriomote islands of the Yaeyama Group, Ryukyu Archipelago, Japan. S. iwasakii belongs to the family Elapidae which also includes cobras and sea snakes.

The International Union for the Conservation of Nature (IUCN) Red List does not include S. iwasakii as a species despite species status as of 2021. Other similar Sinomicrurus species are listed as "Unknown" conservation status.

== Taxonomy ==
Sinomicrurus iwasakii was originally described as Calliophis iwasakii by Maki in 1935. It was long thought to be a subspecies of S. macclellandii but was revalidated as a species in 2021 by Smart, Ingrasci and colleagues.

Sinomicrurus iwasakii is part of the "banded" clade shown in Figure 3 of Smart et al. and is most closely related to S. swinhoei from Taiwan. Phylogenetic analysis shows that these two form a distinct and strongly supported lineage, with a posterior probability of 1.00, indicating a high level of confidence in their shared ancestry. This relationship is consistent across both the traditional tree and the Bayesian cloudogram, where the two species cluster tightly together. Their close genetic connection suggests a recent common ancestor and highlights a likely biogeographic link between the Ryukyu Islands and Taiwan, potentially shaped by historical dispersal or land bridge events.

=== Etymology ===
The genus Sinomicrurus is derived from the Chinese word sino, meaning "China", and from the Greek mikros, meaning "small", and oura, meaning "tail".

The species is named after Takuji Iwasaki (1869-1937), the chief meteorologist and honorary citizen in Ishigaki-jima. Takuji made major contributions to biology, especially through his work identifying new species. A Japanese article refers to him as, a pioneer in the study of the southern islands.

He identified and named several insects, and raised butterflies such as the Oogomadara (Idea leuconoe), also known as the rice paper or paper kite butterfly, and the Konoha Cho, observing their behavior closely. The Oogomadara is originally from Southeast Asia and is well known for being displayed in butterfly houses.

In herpetology, aside from Iwasaki's coral snake, the Iwasaki Sedaka Hebi (Pareas iwasakii) was named in his honor. Along with his butterflies he raised venomous snakes like the Sakishima habu (Protobothrops elegans) and developed methods for handling them safely.

Common names include Iwasaki's temperate Asian coralsnake, Iwasaki's Korallenotter (German), and in Japanese Iwasaki-wamonbeni-hebi.

== Biology ==
=== Description ===
Sinomicrurus iwasakii is a small species of snake, with most adults measuring between 23 and 33 cm (9 to 13 in) long. Females are usually a little bigger than males. The largest individuals recorded were around 33.5 cm (13.2 in), but snakes this size are rare. On average, males are about 27.2 cm (10.7 in) long, and females about 28 cm (11 in). These snakes are also very light, typically weighing less than 100 grams (3.5 oz).

The scales on their bodies are arranged in 17 to 19 rows down the middle. Males usually have 210 to 233 belly scales and 35 to 40 paired scales under the tail, while females have 223 to 230 belly scales and 32 to 37 tail scales. On the head, they have 7 upper lip scales and 6 lower lip scales. They also have 2 scales just behind each eye.

Their color pattern includes a light brown or gray background with 26 to 36 black bands on the body in males, and 29 to 37 in females. Sometimes, there are tiny black spots between the bands. The tail has 4 to 6 black rings in both sexes. The underside is pale with some darker marks along the sides. Males have slightly longer tails compared to their body length than females do.

=== Diet ===
It is reported to feed on small snakes, but information on its food habits are quite limited. There is one recorded instance where the tail of a Sakishima green snake (Cyclophiops herminae) was found in feces of S. iwasakii.

=== Reproduction ===
Oviparous (egg laying).

=== Venom ===
Sinomicrurus are among some of the least-studied elapid snakes regarding venom composition and toxicity.

While no studies have specifically examined S. iwasakii, research on S. kelloggi and S. macclellandi has revealed interspecific differences in venom yield, which appear to be influenced by snout-vent length. This means that larger individuals tend to produce more venom.

While venom electrophoretic profiles and protein families differed between studied species, the venom still contained the expected elapid Three-finger toxins (3FTx), which affect the nervous system, and Phospholipase A2 (PLA2), cell membrane disrupters and contributes to neurotoxicity.

Both Naja atra and Bungarus multicinctus commercial antivenoms demonstrated the ability to immunorecognize these venoms, with N. atra antivenom showing greater neutralization efficacy. This suggests potential cross-reactivity and possible effectiveness of N. atra antivenom against S. iwasakii envenomation. Although further studies should be done, this could be a possible treatment method.

== Behavior ==
According to an account from Herpetological Review, a female snake was found on a path in the subtropical laurel forest on Iriomote Island. When the snake was found it was motionless, and the body was outstretched. It was approached with a flashlight and remained motionless. When touched by a hand, it quickly withdrew and flattened its body dorsoventrally. To incite further defensive responses, the snake's body was tapped with a finger, after which it began wriggling and coiling its tail. Approximately one minute after the start of the finger tapping, the snake started to escape and was immediately captured. When the body was grabbed it bit the leather glove of the handler and continued chewing for approximately five minutes. Tail stabbing was also observed during handling.
