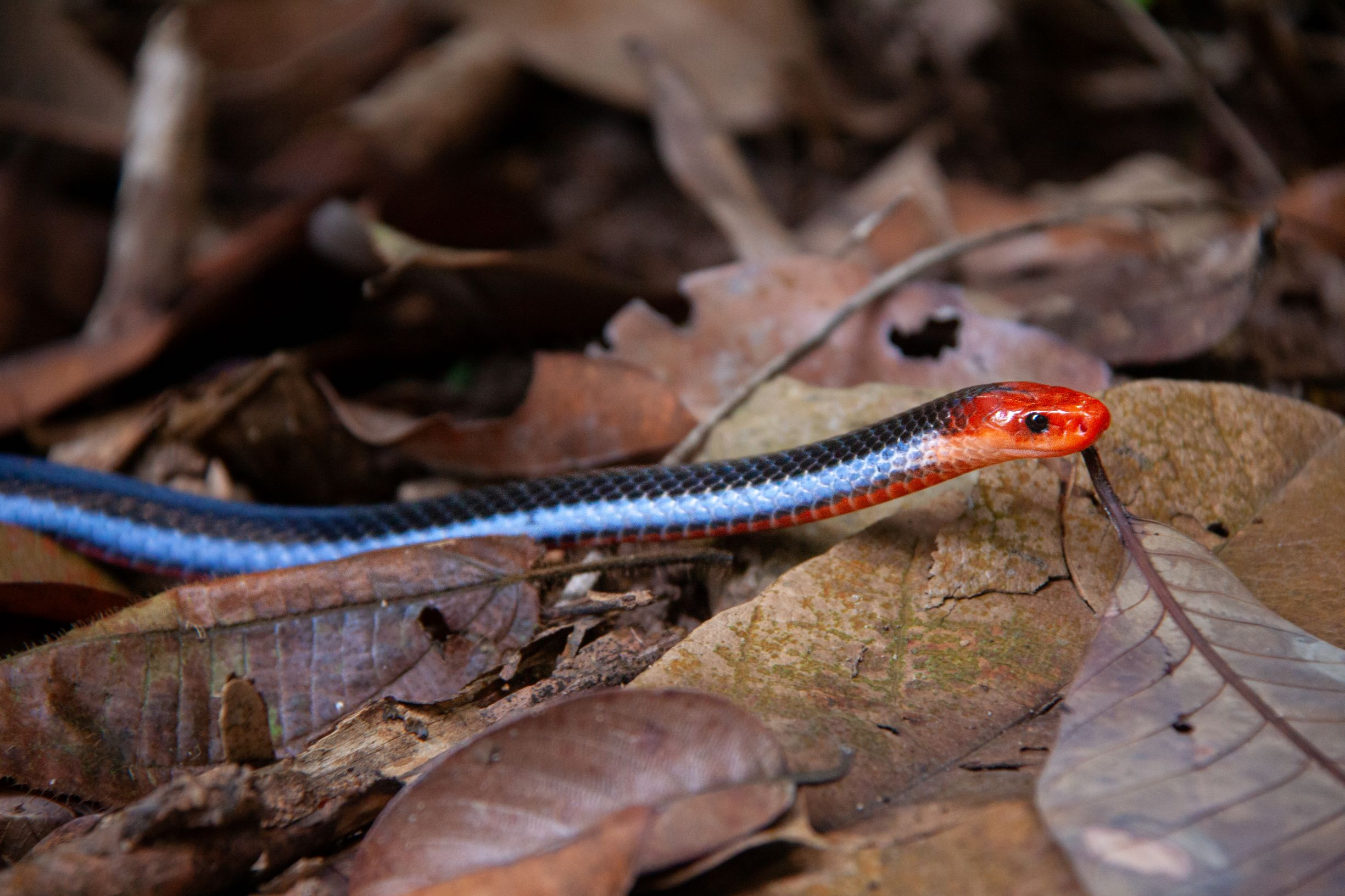

Conservation status
- Least Concern (IUCN 3.1)

Scientific classification
- Kingdom: Animalia
- Phylum: Chordata
- Class: Reptilia
- Order: Squamata
- Suborder: Serpentes
- Family: Elapidae
- Genus: Calliophis
- Species: C. bivirgatus

Binomial name
- Calliophis bivirgatus (F. Boie, 1827)

Synonyms
- Elaps bivirgatus F. Boie, 1827; Callophis bivirgata — Günther, 1864; Adeniophis (Callophis) bivirgatus — Stoliczka, 1873; Adeniophis bivirgatus — Boettger, 1887; Doliophis bivirgatus — Boulenger, 1896; Maticora bivirgata — Stejneger, 1922; Calliophis bivirgatus — Slowinski et al. 2001

= Calliophis bivirgatus =

Species of snake

Calliophis bivirgatus, also known commonly as the blue coral snake, the blue Malayan coral snake, and the blue Malaysian coral snake, is a species of venomous snake in the family Elapidae. The species is native to Southeast Asia. There are three recognized subspecies.

== Geographic distribution ==
Calliophis bivirgatus occurs in Brunei, Indonesia, Malaysia, Singapore, Thailand, and Burma, at 100 to 1,100 metres (300 to 3,600 ft) in elevation.

== Subspecies ==
There are three subspecies that are recognized as being valid, including the nominotypical subspecies.

- Calliophis bivirgatus bivirgatus (F. Boie, 1827) – Indonesia
- Calliophis bivirgatus flaviceps (Cantor, 1839) – Indonesia, Malaysia, Thailand, Singapore, Burma
- Calliophis bivirgatus tetrataenia (Bleeker, 1859) – Indonesia, Malaysia, Brunei

Nota bene: A trinomial authority in parentheses indicates that the subspecies was originally described in a genus other than Calliophis.

== Taxonomy ==
Originally described in the genus Elaps, the blue coral snake was assigned to the old world coral snake genus Maticora until phylogenetic studies revealed this species to be nested within the tropical coral snake species clade Calliophis and to be a sister species to Calliophis intestinalis, the banded Malaysian coral snake.

== Description ==
Calliophis bivirgatus is a medium-sized old world coral snake with a slender body. The adult can reach a total length (tail included) of 1.8 metres (5 ft 11 in). It has a red head, tail and belly. The back is dark blue or black in colour, and it usually has a large blue or white stripe on each flank.

Especially when juvenile, it is often confused with the pink-headed reed snake (Calamaria schlegeli) as they share similar habitat and appearance. But the latter is much smaller, reaching a maximum total length of 50 cm (20 in). The reed snake is nonvenomous, but the venom of the blue coral snake is potentially lethal. They also are very similar to another venomous snake, the red-headed krait (Bungarus flaviceps).

== Behavior and diet ==
Calliophis bivirgatus is considered terrestrial and semi-fossorial, foraging in the leaf litter of primary and secondary forests. It preys on other snakes. When threatened it usually flees, but it may remain in place with its red tail erect as a defensive message.

== Venom ==
Blue coral snake venom has only occasionally caused human deaths. This species has unusually long venom glands, extending to 25% of the length of the body. The venom contains a neurotoxin, Calliotoxin, that causes near instantaneous paralysis by delaying inactivation of the prey's sodium channels. This effect has not been observed in humans. The venom also contains phosphodiesterases, which promote the release of adenosine, causing in turn hypotension, inflammation, and neurotransmitter blockade in prey items and other bite victims. This ability is especially important as their prey consists mostly of other venomous snakes.

In humans, local effects of a bite self-resolve without complication and systemic effects are rare.

There is hope that the venom may eventually prove useful in the management of chronic pain in humans.

== See also ==
- Ophiophagy
