= Calliophis castoe =

Castoe's coral snake

Conservation status
- Endangered (IUCN 3.1)

Scientific classification
- Kingdom: Animalia
- Phylum: Chordata
- Class: Reptilia
- Order: Squamata
- Suborder: Serpentes
- Family: Elapidae
- Genus: Calliophis
- Species: C. castoe

Binomial name
- Calliophis castoe Smith et al., 2012

Species of venomous snake

Calliophis castoe, or Castoe's coral snake, is a species of venomous snake in the family Elapidae. The species is endemic to Western Ghats in western peninsular India.

== Etymology ==
C. castoe is named after biologist, Todd A. Castoe.

== Geographic range ==
Castoe's coral snake is found in semi-evergreen and wet forests in the central part of Western Ghats across Maharashtra, Goa and Karnataka. Despite its occurrence in lowland and mountainous parts of relatively well-populated areas, it was described only in 2009. Earlier collectors such as Phipson and Wall had collected dark specimens of C. nigrescens from locations that record this species, which have now been identified as C. castoe. In 1887, in a paper describing 10 venomous snakes of the (then) Bombay Presidency, Phipson describes a specimen of what he considered to be Calliophis nigrescens collected by Vidal in Carwar (now Karwar in Uttara Kannada) and deposited in the Bombay Natural History Society. Phipson describes the snake as having black upper parts and uniformly red under-parts, possibly based on notes sent in a telegram by Vidal. Later on Vidal describes the same specimen in a paper on venomous snakes of North Kanara as C. nigrescens.

== Description ==
Adult males measure 536–540 mm (21.1–21.3 in) in total length. The snake is unique from other coral snakes in the region because it lacks a pattern on its vinaceous-brown dorsum, and it has a white lower lip with a salmon color to flame scarlet ventral and lateral areas.
