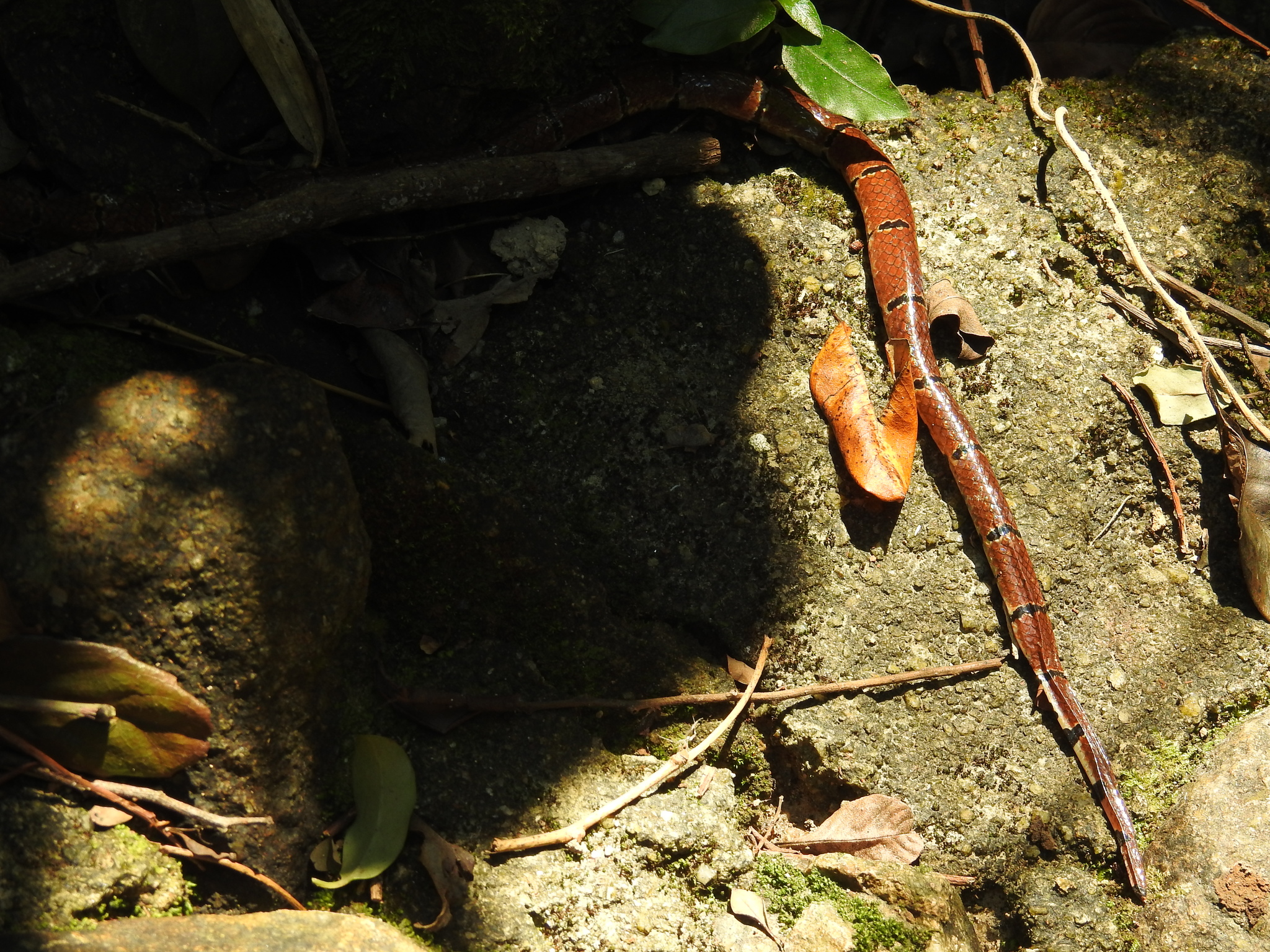

Scientific classification
- Kingdom: Animalia
- Phylum: Chordata
- Class: Reptilia
- Order: Squamata
- Suborder: Serpentes
- Family: Elapidae
- Genus: Sinomicrurus
- Species: S. annularis

Binomial name
- Sinomicrurus annularis (Günther, 1864)

= Sinomicrurus annularis =

Species of snake

Sinomicrurus annularis is a species of Asian coral snake. This snake is relatively unknown, although it is a member of the venomous elapid family.

== Morphology ==
This snake is under three feet in length (32 inches, or 80 centimeters). This snake is a dull red with black crossbands, with a white underside. The pattern of the stripes can vary within this species.

== Taxonomic history ==
The species was originally described as Callophis annularis by Albert Günther in 1864. It was synonymized with Callophis maclellandi in 1891 and resurrected from synonymy as Sinomicrurus annularis in 2021. As a result, almost all of the pertinent literature refers to this species as either Calliophis macclellandi (late 1800s and 1900s) or Sinomicrurus macclellandi (early 2000s).

== Common names ==
The most widely used common name for this species of snake is MacClelland's coral snake, which is a source of confusion since this is also the common name of Sinomicrurus macclellandi.

== Geographic range ==
Although S. macclellandi is widespread in central Asia south of the Himalayas (northern India, Nepal, Bhutan, Bangladesh, Myanmar, Thailand, Laos, Cambodia, western Vietnam, and parts of China), S. annularis is restricted to northeastern Vietnam and southeastern China (including Hainan and Hong Kong). Because many observations from the zone of contact have not been examined in detail, it is difficult to say exactly where the species boundary occurs.

The MacClelland's coral snake prefers to live in areas with high elevation, despite foraging in detritus.

== Similar species ==
Sinomicrurus annularis can be differentiated from other closely related species of Sinomicrurus (S. macclellandi, S. peinani, S. swinhoei and S. iwasakii) by a combination of absent mid-dorsal and lateral stripes, a temporal scale arrangement of 1+1, 13 dorsal scale rows at midbody, a black rostral band spilling into the frontal scale, a straight anterior edge of the black nuchal band (in dorsal profile) beginning at the parietal scales, and a complete pale parietal band.

== Feeding ==
MacClelland's coral snake produces venom, which is used to subdue its prey. This venom functions by impacting the nervous system of its prey. Very few human deaths have been reported, although the exact number is unknown. However, the venom is capable of altering breathing and heart function of humans.

This snake is nocturnal and is usually reluctant to bite. They generally hide or attempt to startle predators by twitching its body or showing its bottom scales to prevent predators from attacking its head.

This snake species has been documented to feed on other reptiles, such as lizards and even different species of snakes. However, in 2022, a paper was published that recorded a MacClelland's coral snake engaging in cannibalism.

== Reproduction ==
This snake reproduces through egg-laying.

All known species of the coral snake lay eggs to reproduce.

MacClelland's coral snake is nocturnal, so it is possible that mating and egg-laying take place during night. This could make it harder for experts to observe reproductive behaviors.
