= Calliophis nigrotaeniatus =

Scientific classification
- Kingdom: Animalia
- Phylum: Chordata
- Class: Reptilia
- Order: Squamata
- Suborder: Serpentes
- Family: Elapidae
- Genus: Calliophis
- Species: C. nigrotaeniatus

Binomial name
- Calliophis nigrotaeniatus Peters, 1863

Species of snake

Calliophis nigrotaeniatus, the banded Malaysian coral snake or striped coral snake, is a species of snake of the family Elapidae.

The snake is found in Indonesia and Malaysia.
