= Calliophis maculiceps =

Conservation status
- Least Concern (IUCN 3.1)

Scientific classification
- Kingdom: Animalia
- Phylum: Chordata
- Class: Reptilia
- Order: Squamata
- Suborder: Serpentes
- Family: Elapidae
- Genus: Calliophis
- Species: C. maculiceps

Binomial name
- Calliophis maculiceps (Günther, 1858)

Synonyms
- Elaps maculiceps Günther, 1858: 232; Elaps melanurus Cantor, 1847 (not Shaw; fide M.A. Smith, 1943); Calliophis maculiceps punctulatus Bourret, 1934; Callophis [sic] maculiceps — M.A. Smith, 1943: 420; Maticora maculiceps — Golay et al., 1993; Calliophis maculiceps — Manthey & Grossmann, 1997: 420; Calliophis maculiceps — Cox et al., 1998: 32; ______________________________ Calliophis maculiceps atrofrontalis (Sauvage, 1877): Elaps atrofrontalis Sauvage, 1877; Calliophis maculiceps atrofrontalis — Sang et al., 2009; ______________________________ Calliophis maculiceps hughi (Cochran, 1927): Callophis hughi Cochran, 1927; Callophis hughi — M.A. Smith, 1943; Callophis hughi — Taylor, 1965; Maticora maculiceps hughi — Welch, 1994: 75; Calliophis maculiceps hughi — Sang et al., 2009; _______________________________ Calliophis maculiceps maculiceps (Günther, 1858): Elaps maculiceps Günther, 1858; Maticora maculiceps maculiceps — Welch, 1994: 75; Calliophis maculiceps maculiceps — Sang et al., 2009; _______________________________ Calliophis maculiceps michaelis Deuve 1961: Calliophis maculiceps michaelis Deuve, 1961; Maticora maculiceps michaelis — Welch, 1994: 75; Calliophis maculiceps michaelis — Sang et al., 2009; _______________________________ Calliophis maculiceps smithi Klemmer, 1963: Callophis maculiceps var. univirgatus M.A. Smith, 1915 (nomen oblitum); Calliophis maculiceps smithi Klemmer, 1963 (nomen novum); Calliophis maculiceps smithi — Sang et al., 2009

Species of snake

Calliophis maculiceps, commonly known as the speckled coral snake or the small-spotted coral snake, is a species of venomous elapid snake endemic to Southeast Asia. Five subspecies are recognized, including the nominotypical subspecies.

== Geographic range ==
C. maculiceps is found in Myanmar, Thailand, Laos, Cambodia, and Vietnam.

== Subspecies ==
The following five subspecies are considered valid:

- Calliophis maculiceps atrofrontalis (Sauvage, 1877)
- Calliophis maculiceps hughi (Cochran, 1927)
- Calliophis maculiceps maculiceps (Günther, 1858)
- Calliophis maculiceps michaelis Deuve, 1961
- Calliophis maculiceps smithi Klemmer, 1963

Nota bene: A trinomial authority in parentheses indicates that the subspecies was originally described in a genus other than Calliophis.
