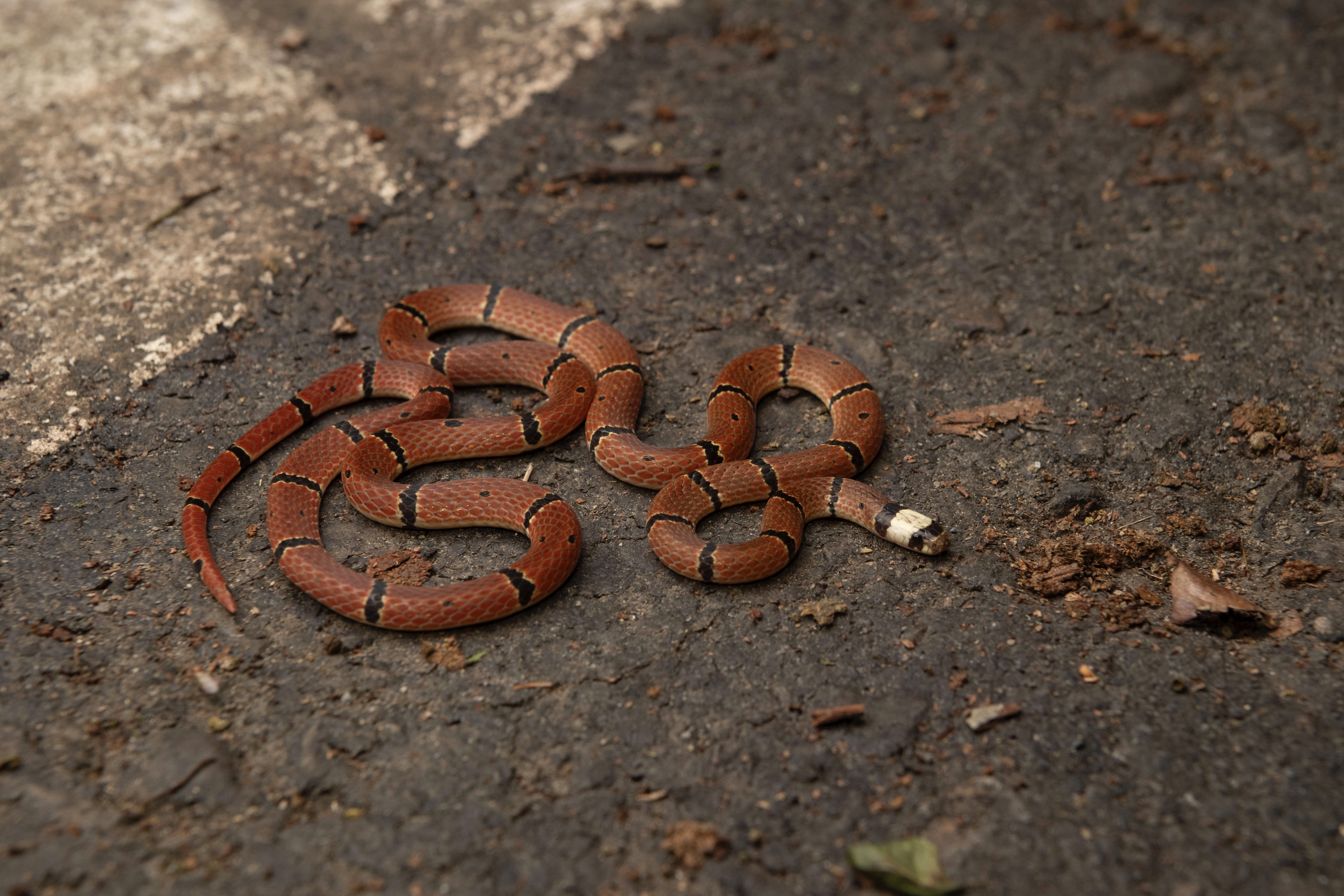

Scientific classification
- Kingdom: Animalia
- Phylum: Chordata
- Class: Reptilia
- Order: Squamata
- Suborder: Serpentes
- Family: Elapidae
- Genus: Sinomicrurus
- Species: S. swinhoei

Binomial name
- Sinomicrurus swinhoei (Van Denburgh, 1922)

Synonyms
- Calliophis swinhoei Van Denburgh, 1912; Micrurus macclellandi swinhoei — Welch, 1994; Sinomicrurus macclellandi swinhoei — Nguyen et al., 2009

= Sinomicrurus swinhoei =

Species of snake

Sinomicrurus swinhoei, also known as Swinhoe's temperate Asian coralsnake, is a highly venomous species of coral snake in the family Elapidae. It is endemic to Taiwan. The specific name is in honor of the English naturalist Robert Swinhoe, who was first European consul in Taiwan. Common name has been proposed for it.

== Taxonomy ==
Originally described as Calliophis swinhoei by John Van Denburgh in 1922, recent literature has treated it as subspecies of Sinomicrurus macclellandi. However, it was elevated back to full species status as Sinomicrurus swinhoei in a 2021 revision of Sinomicrurus by Smart and colleagues.

== Description ==
S. swinhoei are relatively small snakes: males measure 19–48 cm (7.5–18.9 in) and females 19–51 cm (7.5–20.1 in) in snout–vent length (SVL). The tail is 10–16 % of SVL. Some sources suggests a much higher maximum total length (i.e., including tail), 98 cm (39 in). There are 13 dorsal scale rows, 223–239 ventral scales in females and 207–221 in males, and 32–36 subcaudal scales in females and 36–41 in males. There are 1+1 temporal scales. The head is dorsally marked with broad cream to white band running across head behind eyes. The base color is brown-black to black. Ventrally, the head is white to very light gray. The snout is whitish. The body and tail are dorsally red to rusty brown, with scales flecked with diffuse dark brown or black. There are a series of narrow, black, light-edged cross bands, which can be incomplete on the flanks. Ventral coloration is cream to light gray with black irregular designs.

== Venom ==
Sinomicrurus swinhoei is highly venomous. Although it is not aggressive and very few reports of attacks have been reported, its venom is potentially life-threatening.

== Reproduction ==
Sinomicrurus swinhoei is oviparous and lays 4–14 eggs in summer.

== Habitat and conservation ==
Sinomicrurus sauteri is widespread in Taiwan and occurs below elevations of 1,000 m (3,300 ft) or 1,200 m (3,900 ft) above sea level. It lives on montane forest floor, in stone cracks, and among leaf litter. It is cathemeral.

Sinomicrurus sauteri is a rare species that enjoys protected status in Taiwan.
