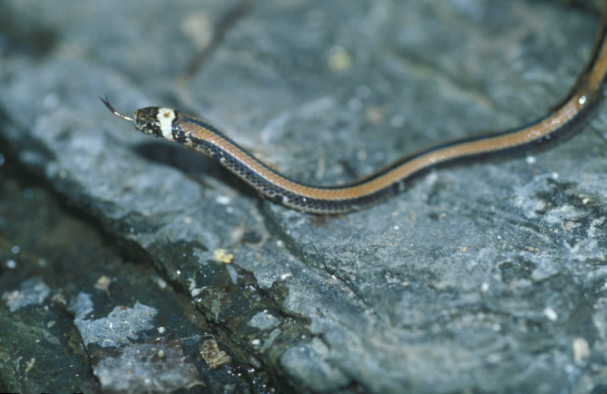
- Sinomicrurus sauteri

Scientific classification
- Kingdom: Animalia
- Phylum: Chordata
- Class: Reptilia
- Order: Squamata
- Suborder: Serpentes
- Family: Elapidae
- Subfamily: Elapinae
- Genus: Sinomicrurus; Slowinski, Boundy & Lawson, 2001

Species
- nine, see text

= Sinomicrurus =

Genus of snakes

Sinomicrurus is a genus of venomous elapid snakes, one of several genera commonly known as Asian coral snakes or oriental coral snakes. The genus includes nine subtropical species found in Asia. Molecular and morphological analysis suggest this new genus is part of the family Elapidae.

== Species and subspecies ==
- Sinomicrurus annularis (Günther, 1864) – MacClelland’s coral snake (China)
- Sinomicrurus boettgeri (Fritze, 1894) – Boettger's coral snake (Ryukyu Islands)
- Sinomicrurus iwasakii (Maki, 1935) – Iwasaki's temperate Asian coral snake ()
- Sinomicrurus japonicus (Günther, 1868) – Japanese coral snake (Ryukyu Islands)
  - Sinomicrurus japonicus japonicus (Günther, 1868)
  - Sinomicrurus japonicus takarai (Ota, Ito & Lin, 1999)
- Sinomicrurus kelloggi (Pope, 1928) – Kellogg's coral snake (Vietnam, Laos, China)
- Sinomicrurus macclellandi (J.T. Reinhardt, 1844) – MacClelland's coral snake (India, Nepal, Myanmar, Thailand, Vietnam, China, Ryukyu Islands, Taiwan)
  - Sinomicrurus macclellandi macclellandi (J.T. Reinhardt, 1844)
  - Sinomicrurus macclellandi univirgatus (Günther, 1858)
- Sinomicrurus peinani Liu, Yan, Hou, Wang, Nguyen, R. Murphy, Che & Guo, 2020 – Guangxi coral snake (China, Vietnam)
- Sinomicrurus sauteri (Steindachner, 1913) – Oriental coral snake, Taiwan coral snake (Taiwan)
- Sinomicrurus swinhoei (Van Denburgh, 1912) – Swinhoe's temperate Asian coral snake (Taiwan)

Nota bene: An authority (binomial or trinomial) in parentheses indicates that the taxon (species or subspecies) was originally described in a genus other than Sinomicrurus.
