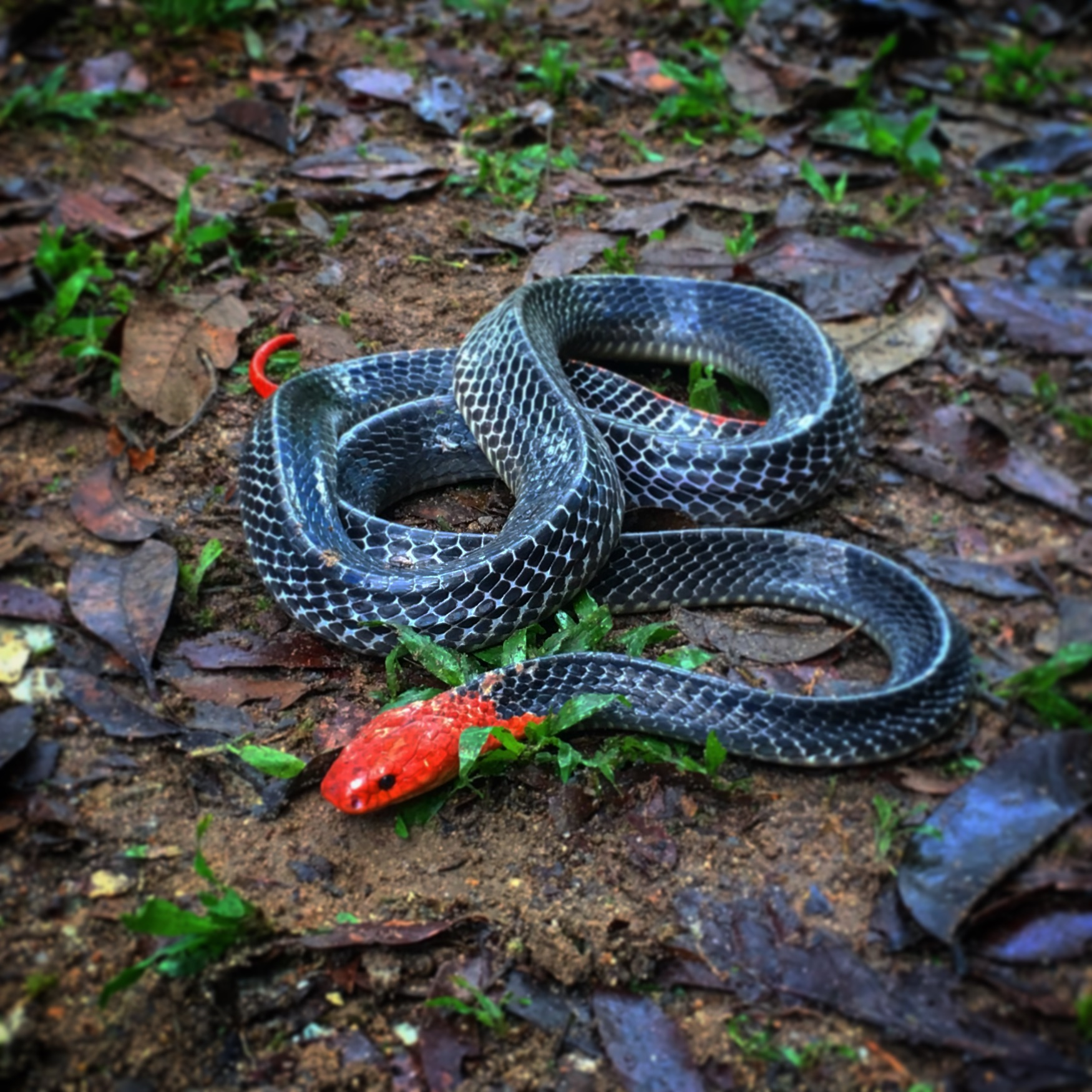

Conservation status
- Least Concern (IUCN 3.1)

Scientific classification
- Kingdom: Animalia
- Phylum: Chordata
- Class: Reptilia
- Order: Squamata
- Suborder: Serpentes
- Family: Elapidae
- Genus: Bungarus
- Species: B. flaviceps

Binomial name
- Bungarus flaviceps Reinhardt, 1843
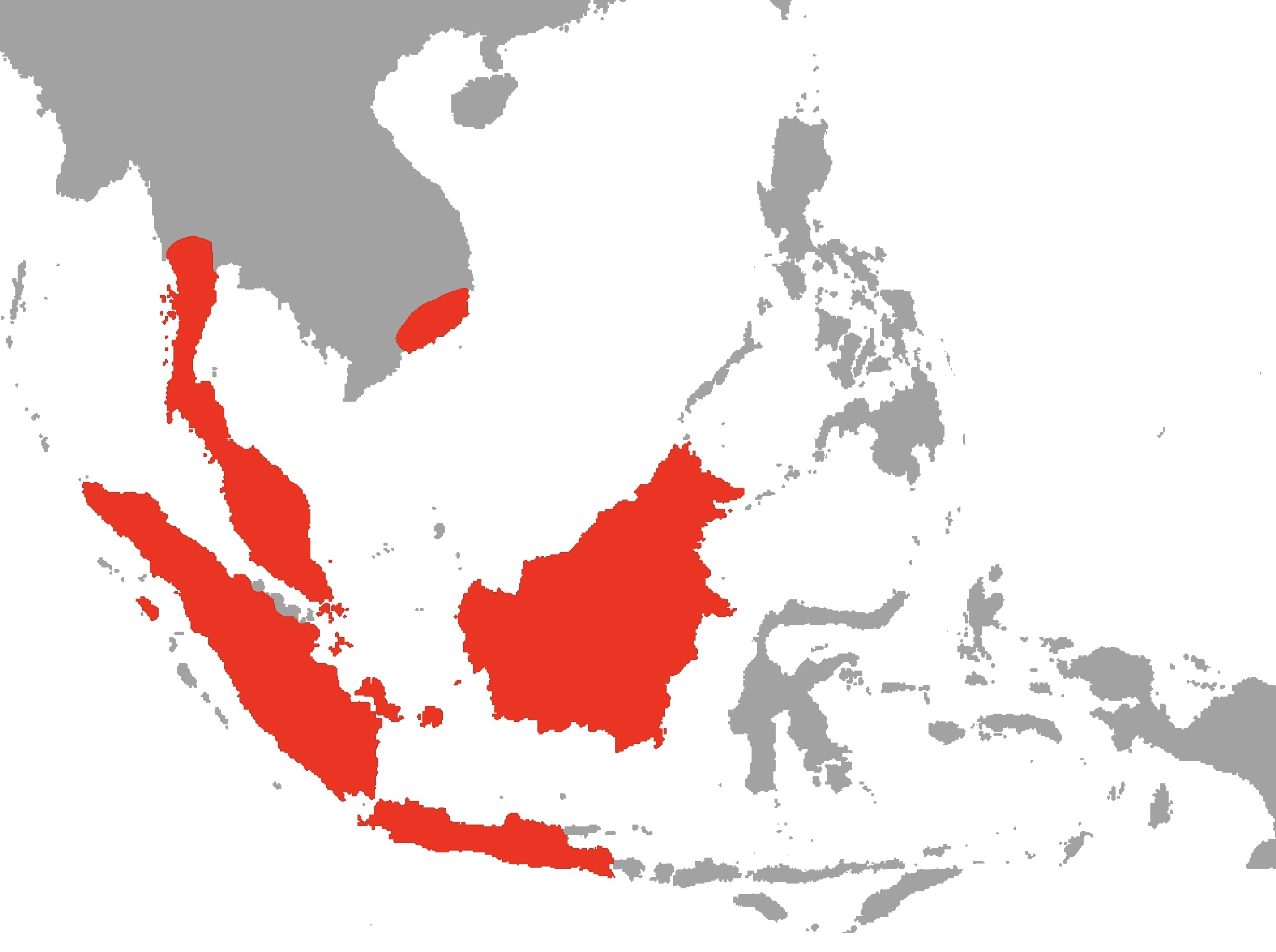

Synonyms
- Megærophis flaviceps – Günther, 1864

= Red-headed krait =

Species of snake

The red-headed krait (Bungarus flaviceps) is a large and highly venomous elapid snake with dramatic coloration. The red-headed krait can grow to a length of up to 2.1 metres (7 ft). It lives in lowland rain forest, including those on islands, but it is considered uncommon. It feeds primarily on specific snakes, probably semiaquatic and fossorial snakes. In Southeast Asia, the red-headed krait occurs in Malaysia, Singapore, Thailand and Indonesia (Sumatra), with a subspecies in Borneo. The venom potency is little-studied, as bites from this species are extremely rare.

== Description ==
The species presents a very striking and distinctive coloration – namely a bright red head and tail with a black body that includes a low-lateral narrow bluish white stripe. Having large, smooth scales, the general appearance of the red-headed krait is glossy and attractive. Captives will generally refuse to strike until they have been subjected to prolonged teasing. The average length of a red-headed krait is 4 to 5 feet (1.2 to 1.5 m), with a maximum of 7 feet (2.1 m). They have short, hollow fangs on their maxillary bones, with inlets at the bases and outlets near their tips. The venom is ducted to the inlet and forced through the hole at the tip of the fang. They are similar to another venomous snake, the blue Malayan coral snake (Calliophis bivirgata) and the nonvenomous red-headed reed snake (Calamaria schlegeli).

== Distribution and habitat ==
The red-headed krait occurs in southern Myanmar and Thailand, Cambodia, Vietnam, Peninsular Malaysia, Borneo, Singapore, and a number of Malaysian (Pulau Tioman) and Indonesian islands (Bangka, Sumatra, Java, and Belitung (Billiton)). The subspecies B. f. baluensis, sometimes called the "Kinabalu krait", is found in Sabah (Borneo).

Red-headed kraits inhabit the rain forests in mountainous and hilly regions. They are hardly ever to be found in proximity to human habitations.

== Behaviour ==
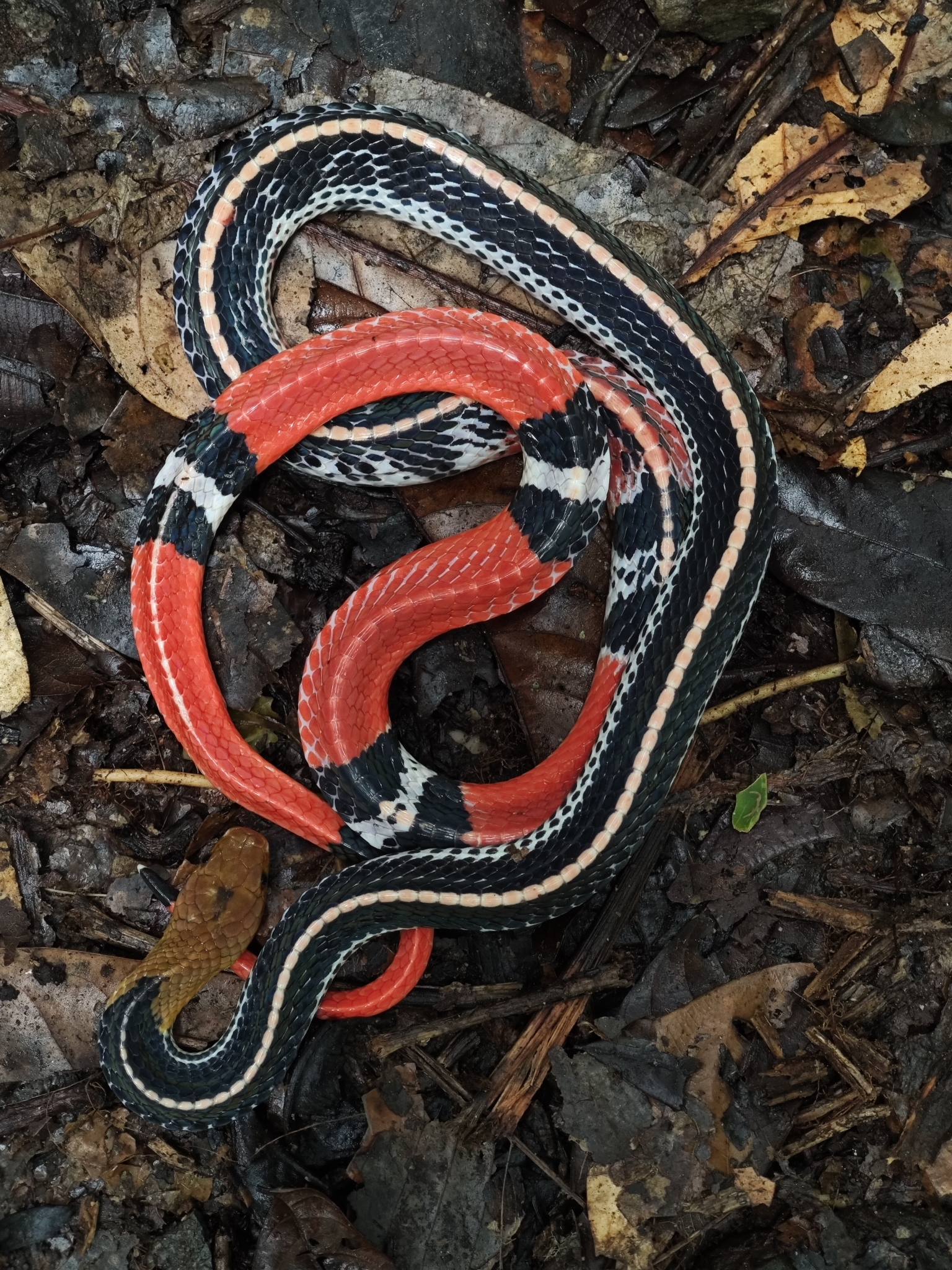
In Sabah, Malaysia

They are nocturnal and partially aquatic. Once thought to feed primarily on other snakes, they are known to include skinks, lizards, frogs, caecilians, small mammals, and snake eggs in their diets. Despite their intrinsic deadliness, they are not usually considered of high risk to humans in the daytime. Variously described as sluggish, lethargic, and extremely inoffensive, they often remain hidden during the day and, when disturbed, press their heads into the ground or hide them in the flattened or rolled coils of their bodies. During the night, they are active and extremely dangerous.

== Venom ==
The red-headed krait is an extremely venomous snake, although bites are reported rarely. Krait venom appears to function primarily as a neurotoxin, preventing communication across neuromuscular synapses, causing paralysis and death by asphyxiation because the victims can no longer breathe on their own. When the venom from the red-headed krait takes effect, the most highly innervated muscles are the first to suffer: the muscle that elevates the upper eyelid and the ocular and ciliary muscles controlling the lens. Between 20 minutes and several hours after being bitten, the victim may struggle to keep their eyelids open. This medical condition is known as bilateral ptosis and it is a classic, tell-tale sign of severe envenomation. Other common symptoms include diplopia, dysphagia, vomiting, headache, and hypersalivation. Sometime later the symptoms of paralysis tend to worsen, with progressive involvement of various muscles, including those of the jaws, in some cases, become locked. Respiratory distress may occur as a result of paralysis of the diaphragm, the main muscle controlling breathing. Its venom also contains a novel postsynaptic neurotoxin, termed κ-flavitoxin, which is a potent inhibitor of nicotinic transmission in autonomic ganglia. Neurotoxic symptoms may resolve naturally, or more rapidly through administration of antivenin or drugs that inactivate acetylcholinesterase, an enzyme which naturally destroys the chemical messenger carrying signals from nerves to muscles at the neuromuscular synapse.
