= Calliophis philippinus =

Scientific classification
- Kingdom: Animalia
- Phylum: Chordata
- Class: Reptilia
- Order: Squamata
- Suborder: Serpentes
- Family: Elapidae
- Genus: Calliophis
- Species: C. philippinus

Binomial name
- Calliophis philippinus (Günther, 1864)

Species of snake

Calliophis philippinus, the Philippine coral snake, is a species of snake of the family Elapidae.

The snake is found in the Philippines.
