= Calliotoxin =

Venom produced only by the blue coral snake

Calliotoxin is a venom produced only by the blue coral snake of Southeast Asia. Calliotoxin is a short-chained neurotoxin that causes the victim's sodium channels to have delayed inactivation, causing them to remain open. This causes all of the neurons to fire at once and producing complete physical paralysis and a rapid death. There is no known antidote, though it is hoped that the venom may eventually become useful in creating painkillers for the management of chronic pain in humans.
