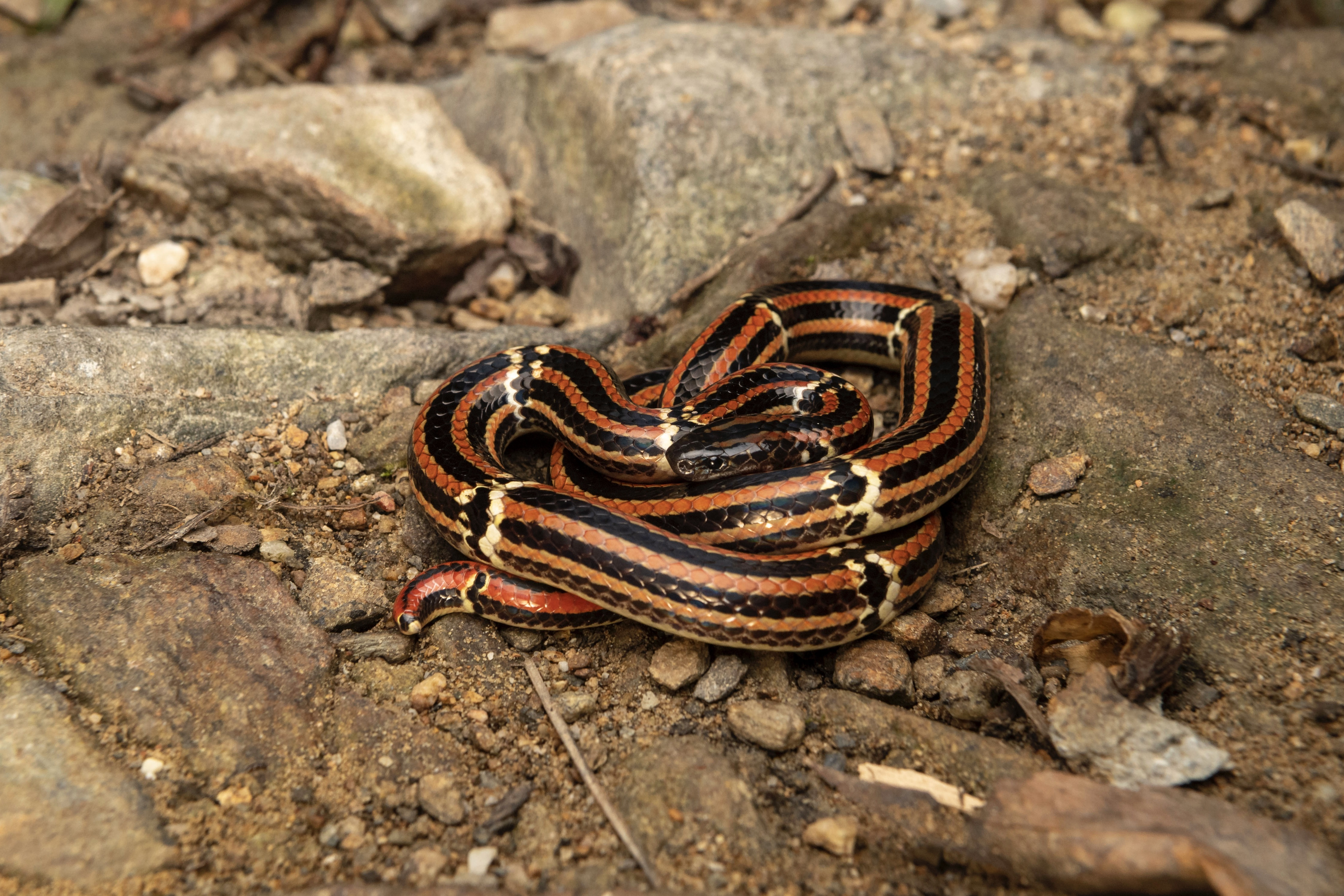

Scientific classification
- Kingdom: Animalia
- Phylum: Chordata
- Class: Reptilia
- Order: Squamata
- Suborder: Serpentes
- Family: Elapidae
- Genus: Sinomicrurus
- Species: S. boettgeri

Binomial name
- Sinomicrurus boettgeri (Fritze, 1894)

= Sinomicrurus boettgeri =

Species of snake

Sinomicrurus boettgeri, the Boettger's coral snake, is a species of snake in the family Elapidae.
