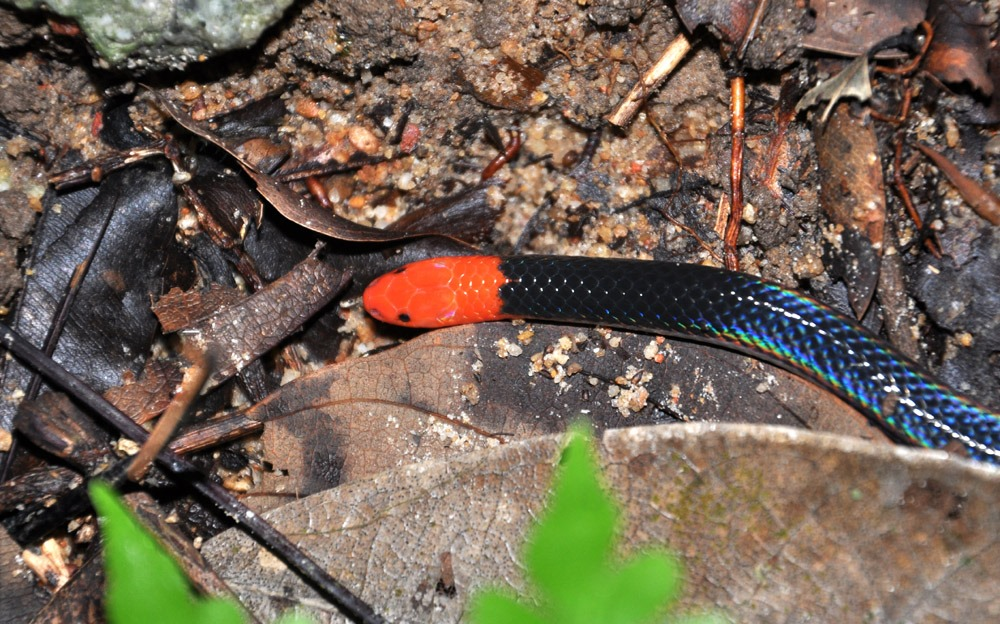

Conservation status
- Least Concern (IUCN 3.1)

Scientific classification
- Kingdom: Animalia
- Phylum: Chordata
- Class: Reptilia
- Order: Squamata
- Suborder: Serpentes
- Family: Colubridae
- Genus: Calamaria
- Species: C. schlegeli

Binomial name
- Calamaria schlegeli A.M.C. Duméril, Bibron & A.H.A. Duméril, 1854
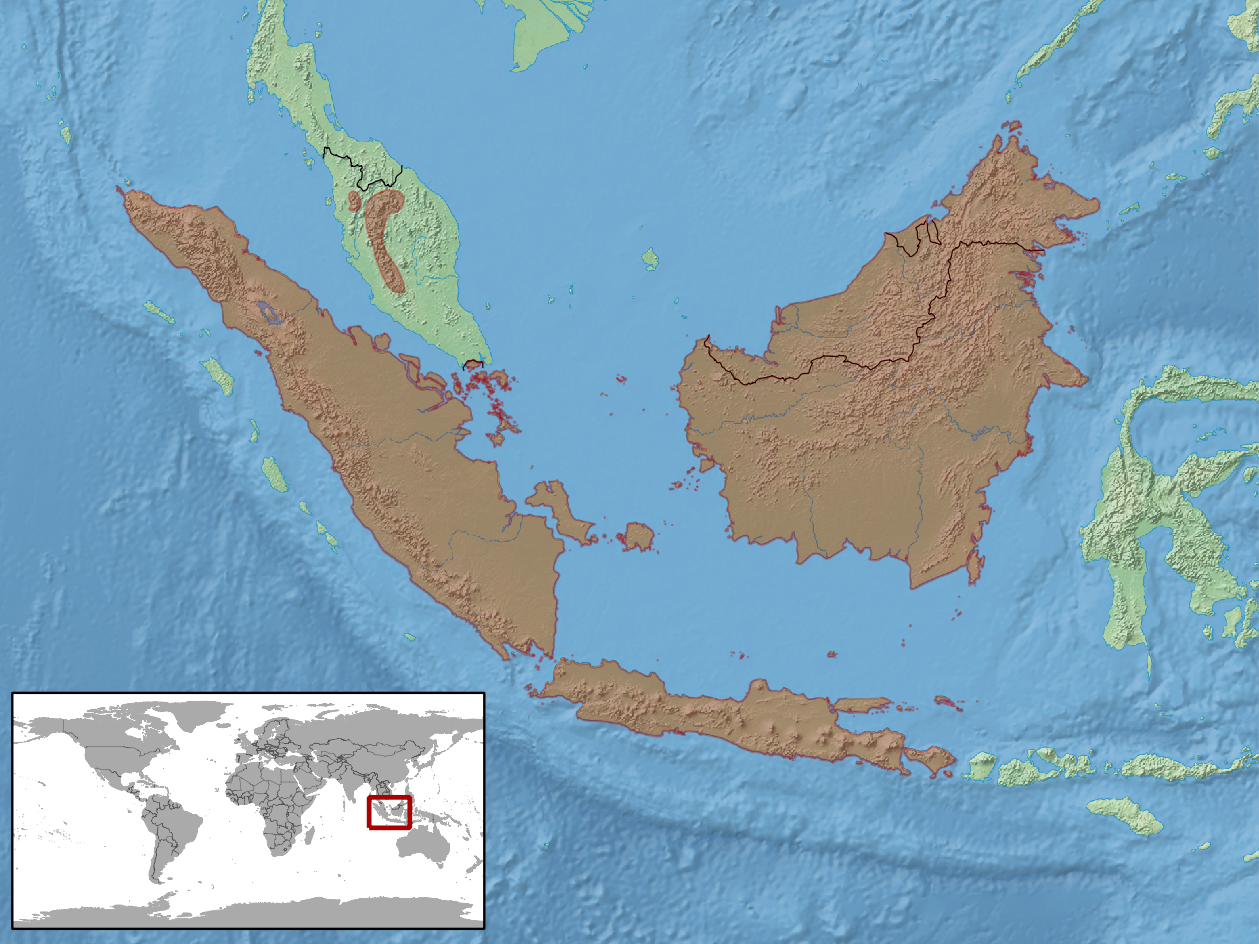

= Calamaria schlegeli =

Species of snake

Calamaria schlegeli is a species of snake in the family Colubridae. The species is known commonly as the red-headed reed snake, white-headed reed snake, and pink-headed reed snake. It is native to Southeast Asia, where it occurs in the Malay Peninsula (Malaysia, Singapore), Borneo (Brunei, Indonesia, Malaysia), and in several Indonesian islands, including Sumatra, Java, Bali.

== Etymology ==
The specific name, schlegeli, is in honor of German herpetologist Hermann Schlegel.

== Identification ==
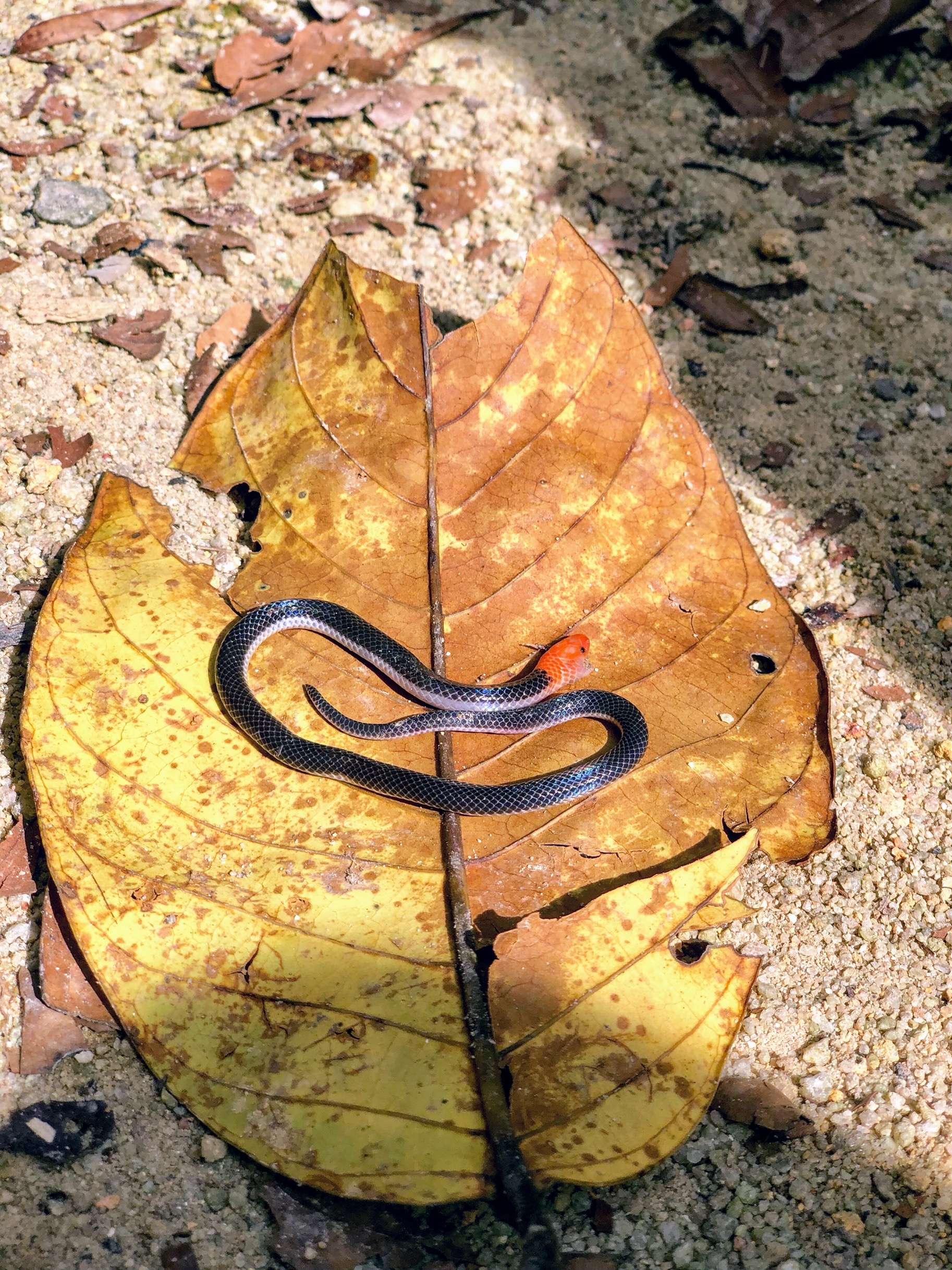
A dead snake from Singapore

The key identification characters for C. schlegeli are modified maxillary teeth and scale characteristics. The third and fourth upper lip scales touch the eye. The mental scale does not touch the anterior chin shields. The nasal scales are oriented laterally. There is considerable geographic variation. Preocular scales are present in snakes from Singapore and Malaya, but absent in those from Java, and sometimes present on those from Borneo and Sumatra.

This nonvenomous red-headed snake is sometimes confused with the venomous blue Malayan coral snake (Calliophis bivirgatus) and the red-headed krait (Bungarus flaviceps), in an example of Batesian mimicry where a non-venomous animal protects itself by appearing similar to a venomous one.

== Biology ==
C. schlegeli lives in forest undergrowth. It sometimes emerges on paths and in yards and gardens. It burrows for cover and feeds on small prey such as worms and insects.
