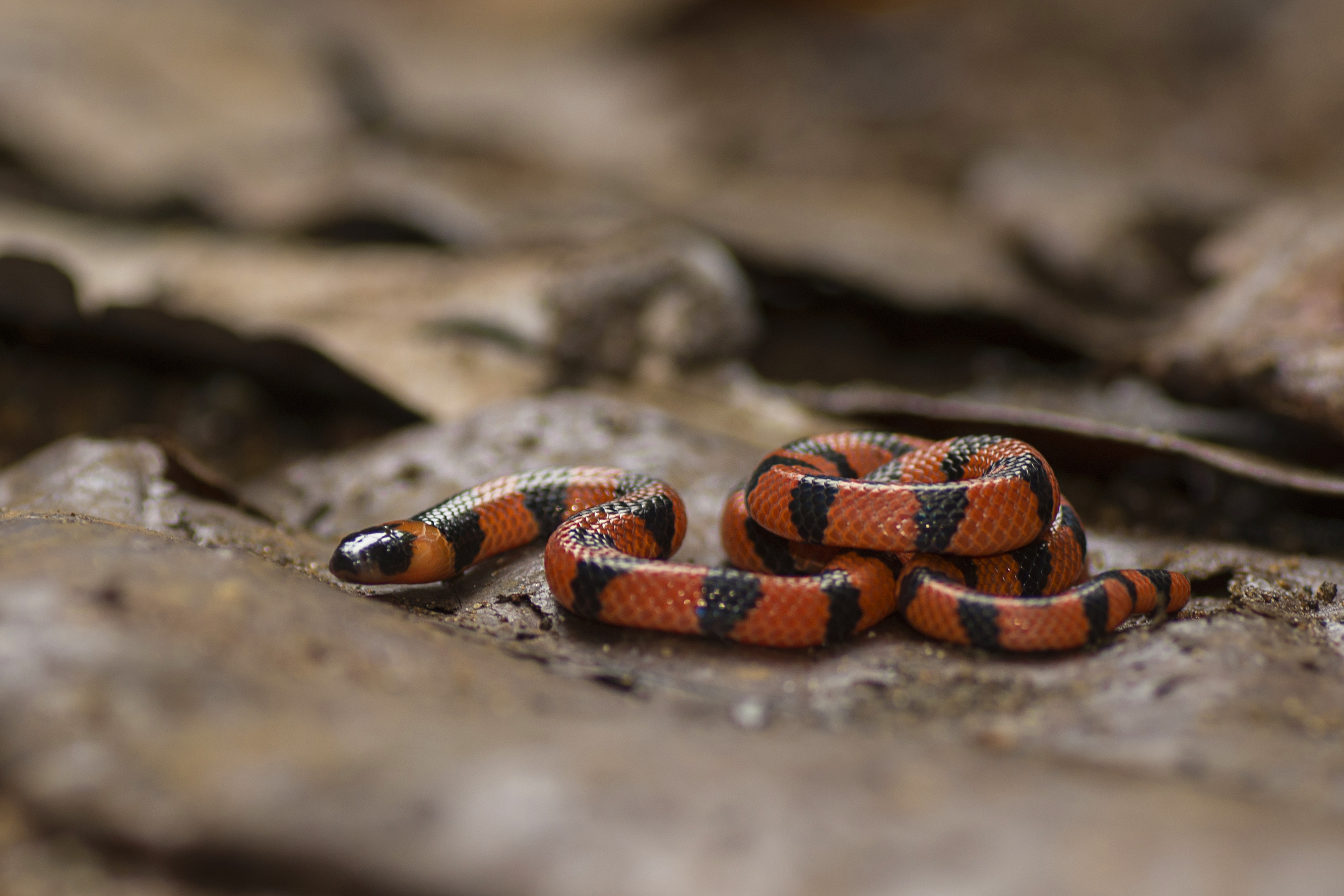

Conservation status
- Least Concern (IUCN 3.1)

Scientific classification
- Kingdom: Animalia
- Phylum: Chordata
- Class: Reptilia
- Order: Squamata
- Suborder: Serpentes
- Family: Elapidae
- Genus: Calliophis
- Species: C. bibroni

Binomial name
- Calliophis bibroni (Jan, 1858)

Synonyms
- Elaps bibroni Jan, 1858; Elaps ceracinus Beddome, 1864; Callophis ceracinus Beddome, 1867; Callophis bibronii Boulenger, 1890; Calliophis bibroni Slowinski, Boundy & Lawson, 2001

= Calliophis bibroni =

Species of snake

Calliophis bibroni, commonly known as Bibron's coral snake, is a species of venomous snake in the family Elapidae. The species is native to India.

== Etymology ==
The specific name, bibroni, is in honor of Gabriel Bibron (1806–1848), French zoologist and herpetologist.

== Distribution and habitat ==
C. bibroni is endemic to the Western Ghats of India, essentially distributed in southern Karnataka state, Kerala state, and northwestern Tamil Nadu state. The preferred natural habitat of C. bibroni is wet forest, at elevations of 1–1,220 m (3 ft 3 in – 4,002 ft 7 in).

In August 2013, a dead specimen was discovered on the highway passing through Mudumalai National Park at an elevation of 894 m (2,933 ft).

== Description ==
Young individual flattening body in defense

The eye of C. bibroni is minute, its diameter about half its distance from the mouth. The frontal is nearly as long as its distance from the snout, much shorter than parietals. As there is no preocular, the prefrontal contacts the third upper labial. There is one very small postocular. The temporals are 1+1. There are seven upper labials, the third and fourth contacting the eye. The first lower labial is much elongate, forming a long suture with its fellow. There are two pairs of chin shields. The anterior chin shields are small, much shorter than posterior, and are in contact with third and fourth lower labials.

The dorsal scales are smooth, without apical pits, and are in 13 rows at midbody. The ventrals number 222-226. The anal is entire. The subcaudals are divided and number 27-34 pairs.

Coloration is cherry-red to dark purplish brown above, red beneath, with black crossbands which are sometimes continuous across the belly. The anterior part of the head is black above.

Adults may attain a total length of 64 cm (25 inches), which includes a tail length of 5 cm (2 inches).

== Diet ==
C. bibroni is ophiophagous, specializing in preying upon snakes of the family Uropeltidae.

== Reproduction ==
C. bibroni is oviparous.
