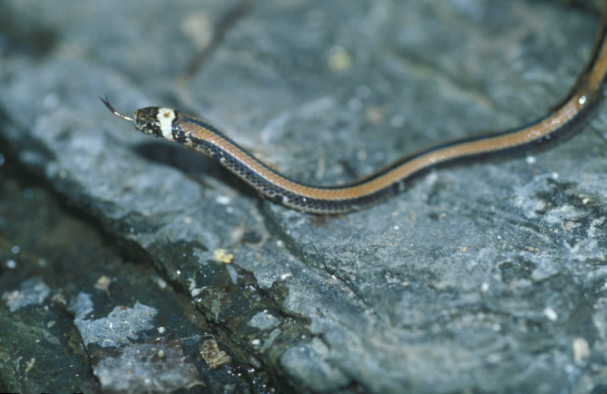

Conservation status
- Least Concern (IUCN 3.1)

Scientific classification
- Kingdom: Animalia
- Phylum: Chordata
- Class: Reptilia
- Order: Squamata
- Suborder: Serpentes
- Family: Elapidae
- Genus: Sinomicrurus
- Species: S. sauteri

Binomial name
- Sinomicrurus sauteri (Steindachner, 1913)

Synonyms
- Oligodon sauteri Steindachner, 1913; Hemibungarus matsudai Ōshima, 1920; Calliophis hatori Takahashi, 1930; Hemibungarus sauteri — Maki, 1931; Calliophis japonicus sauteri — Loveridge, 1946; Calliophis sauteri — Takara, 1962; Micrurus japonicus sauteri — Welch, 1994; Sinomicrurus sauteri — Slowinski, Boundy & R. Lawson, 2001

= Sinomicrurus sauteri =

Species of snake

Sinomicrurus sauteri (common names: Taiwan coral snake, oriental coral snake and Formosa coral snake) is a species of highly venomous coral snake in the family Elapidae. The species is endemic to Taiwan and known from southern and central Taiwan at elevations of 500–1,500 m (1,600–4,900 ft) above sea level.

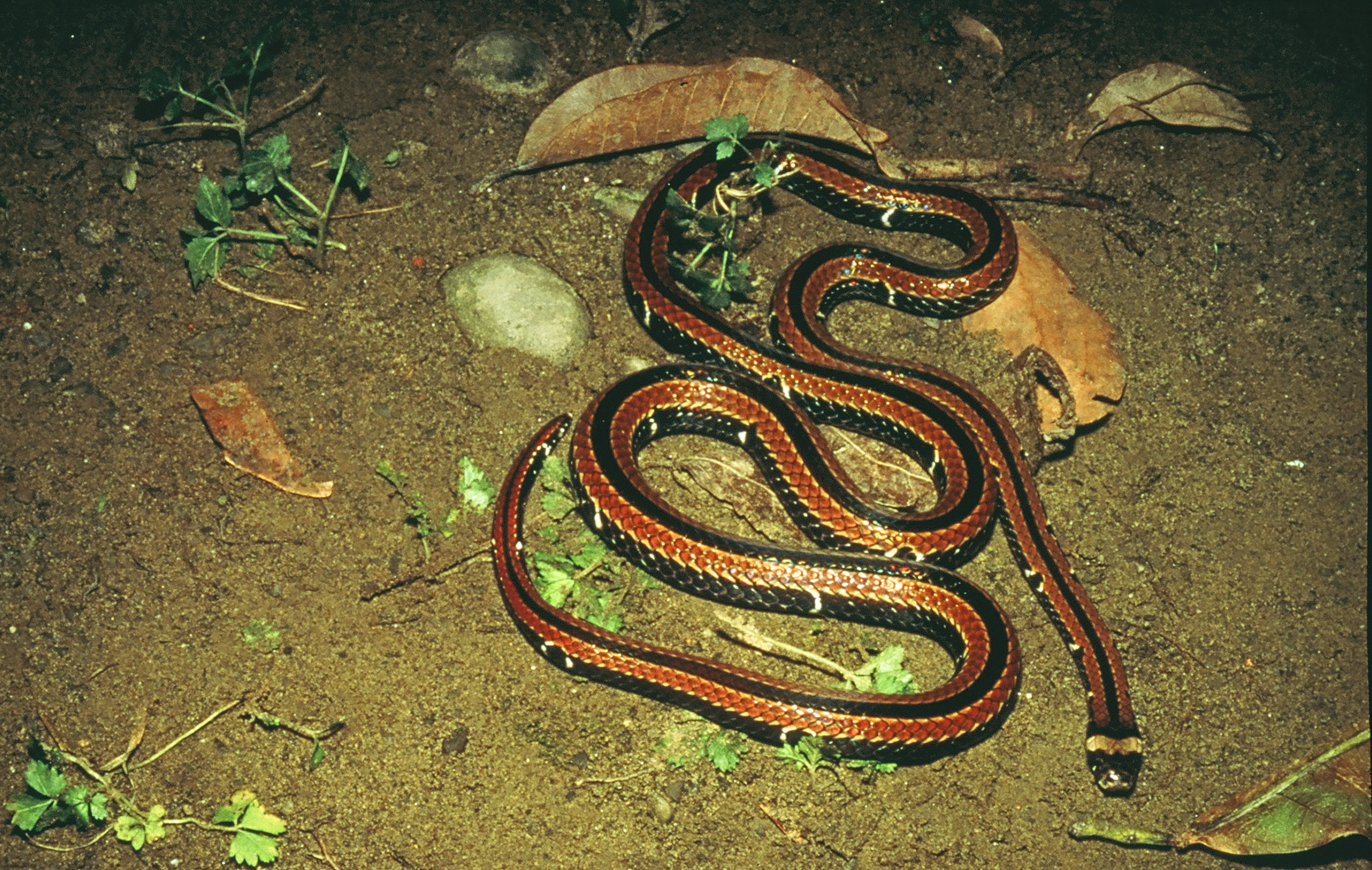

== Etymology ==
The specific name, sauteri, is in honor of German entomologist Hans Sauter (1871–1943).

== Description ==
S. sauteri grows to 98 cm (39 in) in total length (including tail). The upper side of the body is dark brown or crimson, and has three black longitudinal stripes from neck to tip of tail, of which the mid-dorsal stripe is narrower than the lateral ones.

== Venom ==
S. sauteri is highly venomous. Although it is not aggressive and very few reports of bites have been reported, its venom is potentially life-threatening.

== Habitat ==
S. sauteri may be found in forests or meadows in mountainous areas at lower or middle altitudes.

== Behavior ==
S. sauteri is terrestrial and typically nocturnal.

== Diet ==
The diet of S. sauteri is unknown.

== Reproduction ==
S. sauteri is oviparous.

== Conservation status ==
S. sauteri is a rare species protected by the law. It is not considered threatened.
