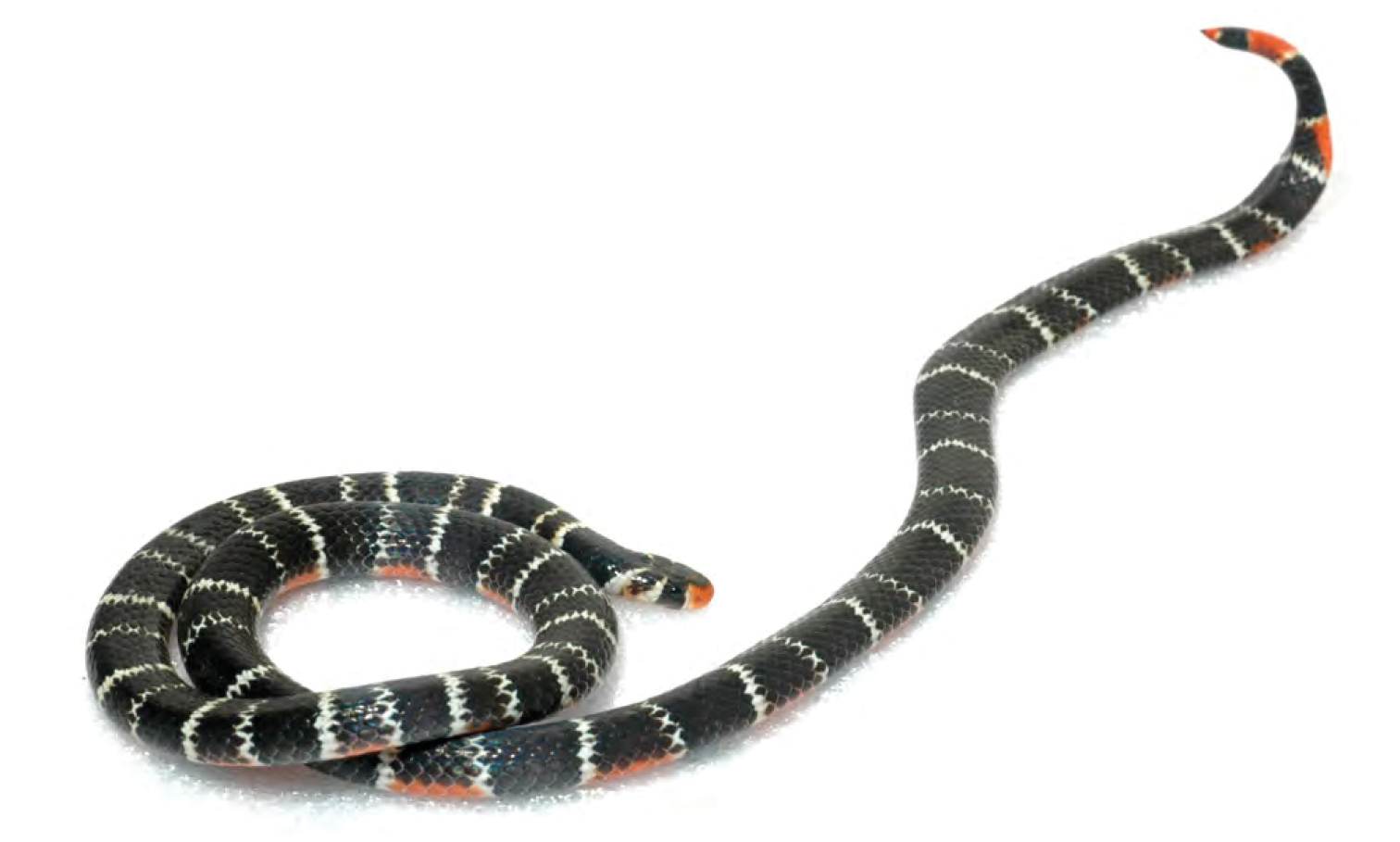

Conservation status
- Least Concern (IUCN 3.1)

Scientific classification
- Kingdom: Animalia
- Phylum: Chordata
- Class: Reptilia
- Order: Squamata
- Suborder: Serpentes
- Family: Elapidae
- Genus: Hemibungarus
- Species: H. calligaster

Binomial name
- Hemibungarus calligaster (Wiegmann, 1835)

= Hemibungarus calligaster =

Species of snake

Hemibungarus calligaster is a species of venomous elapid snake, commonly known as the barred coral snake.

== Distribution ==
This species is endemic to the Philippines.
