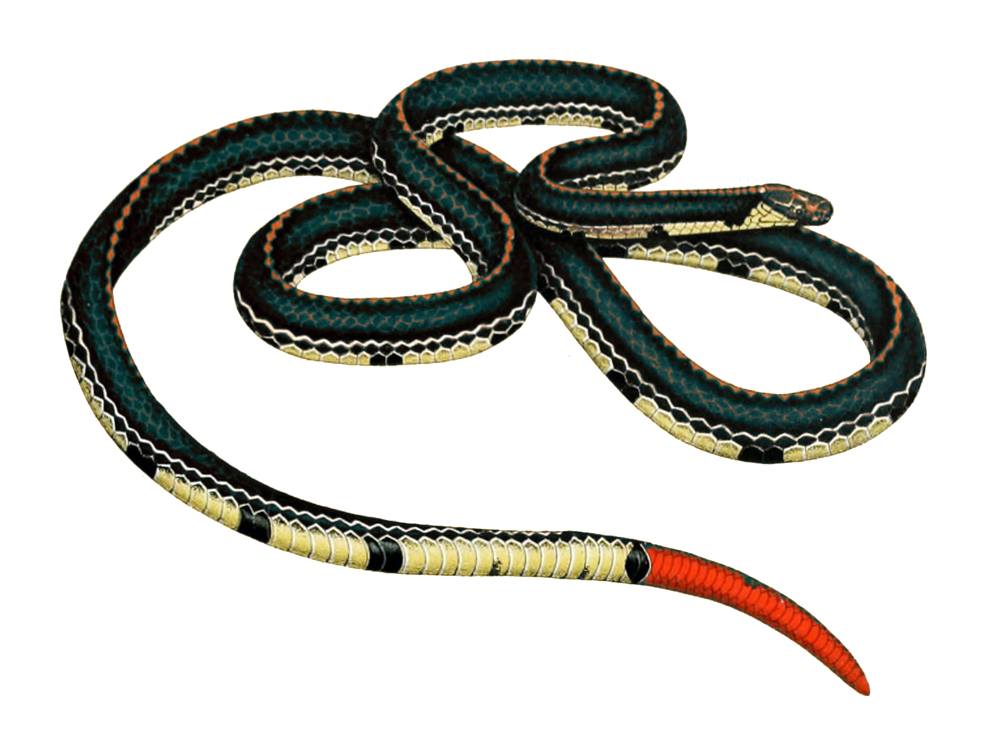

Conservation status
- Least Concern (IUCN 3.1)

Scientific classification
- Kingdom: Animalia
- Phylum: Chordata
- Class: Reptilia
- Order: Squamata
- Suborder: Serpentes
- Family: Elapidae
- Genus: Calliophis
- Species: C. intestinalis

Binomial name
- Calliophis intestinalis (Laurenti, 1768)
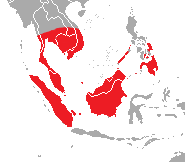
- range

Synonyms
- Aspis intestinalis Laurenti, 1768; Elaps intestinalis — Cantor, 1847; Callophis [sic] intestinalis — Günther, 1859; Adeniophis intestinalis — Boulenger, 1890; Doliophis intestinalis — Boulenger, 1896; Calamaria klossi M.A. Smith, 1926; Maticora intestinalis — Loveridge, 1944; Calliophis intestinalis — Slowinski et al., 2001

= Calliophis intestinalis =

Species of snake

Calliophis intestinalis, commonly known as the banded Malayan coral snake, is a species of venomous elapid snake endemic to Southeast Asia.

== Geographic range ==
C. intestinalis is found in Borneo, Indonesia, Java, Malaysia and Singapore .

== Venom ==
This small species possesses a potent venom, and human fatalities from its bite have been recorded.

== Subspecies ==
Four subspecies are recognized, including the nominotypical subspecies.

- Calliophis intestinalis everetti (Boulenger, 1896)
- Calliophis intestinalis intestinalis (Laurenti, 1768)
- Calliophis intestinalis lineata (Gray, 1835)
- Calliophis intestinalis thepassi (Bleeker, 1859)

Nota bene: A trinomial authority in parentheses indicates that the subspecies was originally described in a genus other than Calliophis.
