= Hemibungarus =

Scientific classification
- Domain: Eukaryota
- Kingdom: Animalia
- Phylum: Chordata
- Class: Reptilia
- Order: Squamata
- Suborder: Serpentes
- Family: Elapidae
- Genus: Hemibungarus; Peters, 1862

Genus of snakes

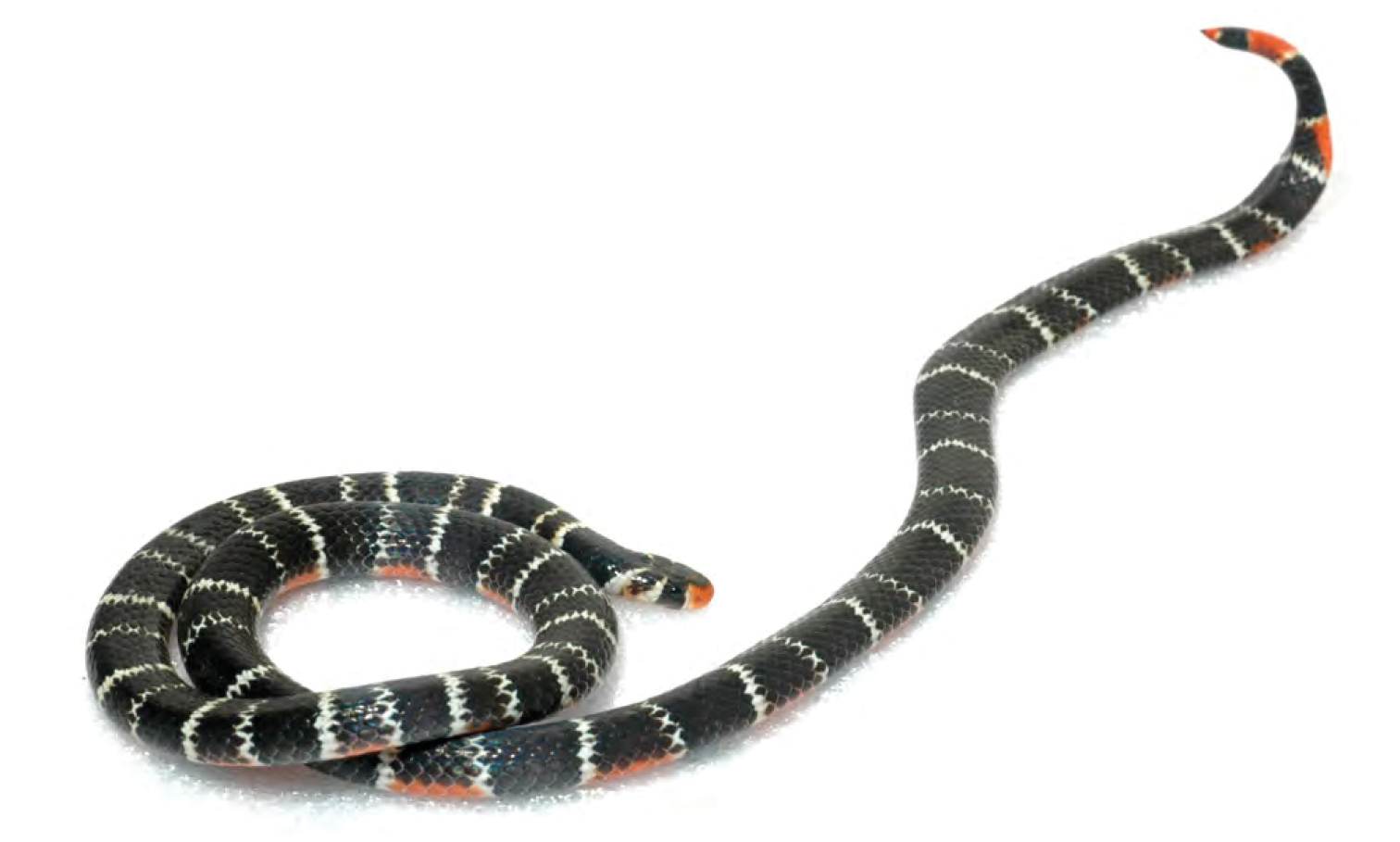
Hemibungarus calligaster

Hemibungarus is a genus of venomous elapid snakes commonly known as barred coral snakes.

== Distribution ==
Hemibungarus species are endemic to the Philippines.

== Species ==
- Barred coral snake, Hemibungarus calligaster (Wiegmann, 1835)
- Philippine false coral snake, Hemibungarus gemianulis (Peters, 1872)
- McClung's Philippine coral snake, Hemibungarus mcclungi (Taylor, 1922)
