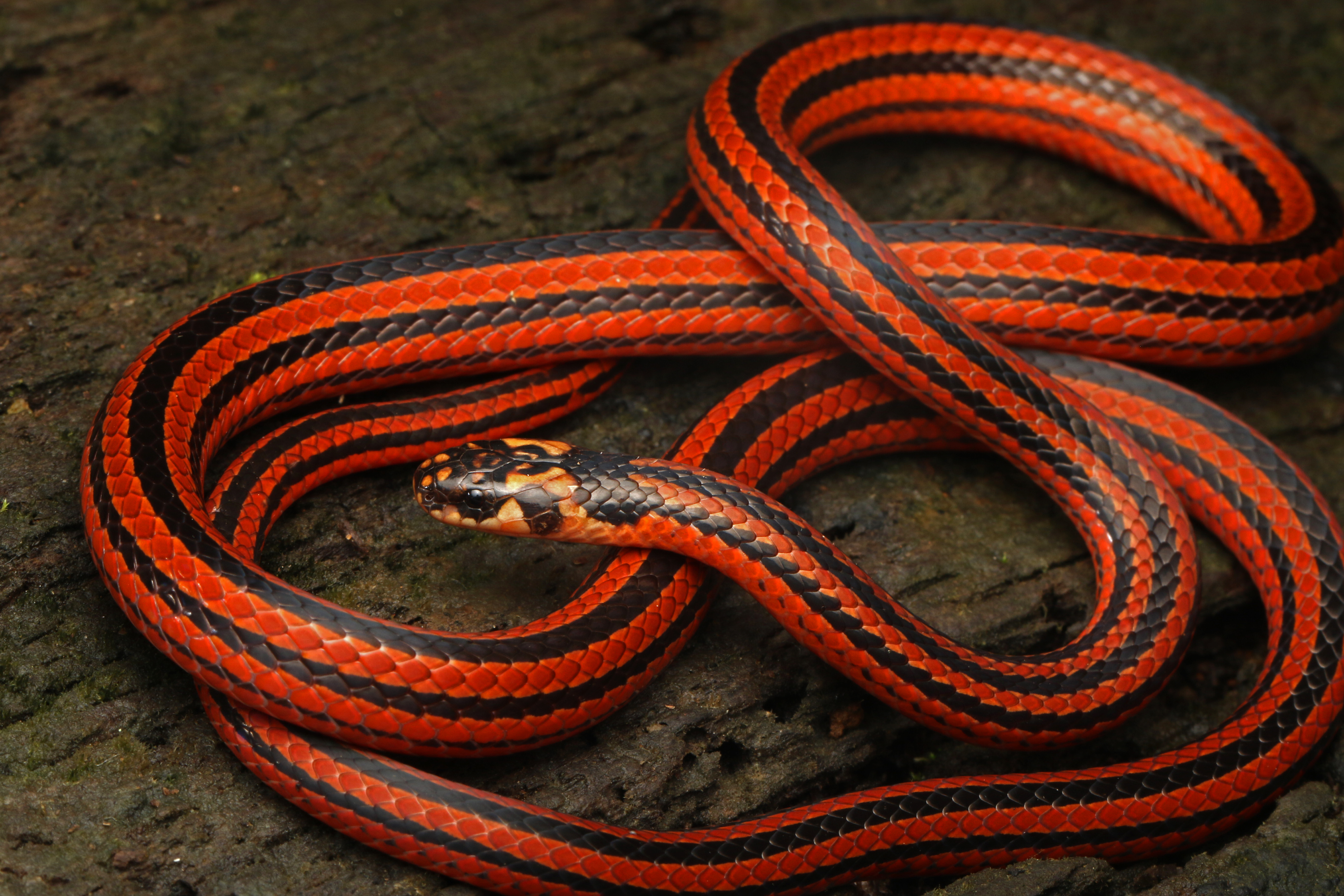
- Calliophis nigrescens pentalinetus

Conservation status
- Least Concern (IUCN 3.1)

Scientific classification
- Kingdom: Animalia
- Phylum: Chordata
- Class: Reptilia
- Order: Squamata
- Suborder: Serpentes
- Family: Elapidae
- Genus: Calliophis
- Species: C. nigrescens

Binomial name
- Calliophis nigrescens (Günther, 1862)

Synonyms
- Callophis [sic] nigrescens Günther, 1862; Callophis concinnus Beddome, 1863; Callophis pentalineatus Beddome, 1871; Hemibungarus nigrescens — Boulenger, 1896; Maticora nigriscens — Golay et al., 1993; Calliophis nigriscens — Slowinski et al., 2001

= Calliophis nigrescens =

Species of reptile

Calliophis nigriscens, commonly known as the black coral snake or striped coral snake, is a species of venomous elapid snake endemic to the Western Ghats, India.

== Geographic range ==
It is found in India in the Western Ghats, Karwar, Wayanad, Nilgiris, Anamalai, and the Travancore hills at 4,000–6,000 feet (1,200–1,800 m).

== Description ==
See snake scales for terms used.

Rostral broader than long; frontal as long as its distance from the end of the snout, much shorter than the parietals; one preocular and two postoculars; a single temporal; seven upper labials, third and fourth entering the eye; anterior chin shields as long as the posterior or a little shorter, in contact with four labials.

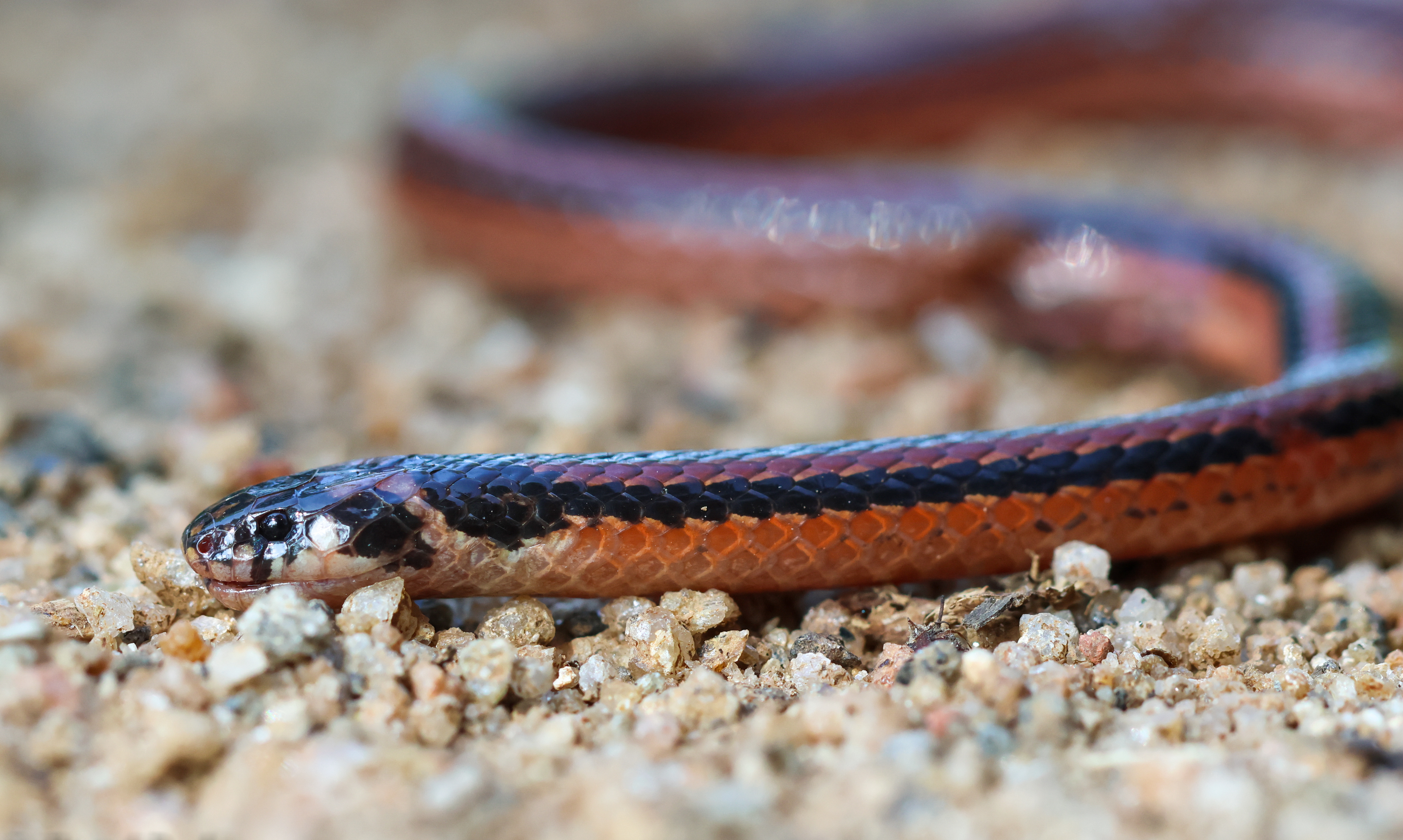
From Western Ghats of Kerala

Dorsal scales in 13 rows. Ventrals 232–261; anal usually divided; subcaudals 33–44.

This species comprises several colour varieties, which are connected by insensible gradations; in all the head and nape are black, with an oblique yellow band, sometimes broken up into spots, on each side from the parietals to behind the angle of the mouth, and the upper lip is yellow in front of and behind the eye; lower parts uniform red.

Color variations include the following:

- A. Dark purplish brown above, with three or five longitudinal series of black, light-edged spots.
- B. The spots confluent and forming three longitudinal black bands edged with whitish.
- C. Intermediate between A and B.
- D. Dark purplish brown above, with three or five more or less distinct black stripes, which are not light-edged.
- E. Pale reddish brown or red above, with five black stripes.

Total length 110 cm (43 in); tail 11.5 cm (4 1/2 in).
