= Takuji Iwasaki =

- Born: November 17, 1869; Sendai, Miyagi, Japan
- Died: May 2, 1937 (aged 67); Ishigaki, Okinawa, Japan
- Occupations: Meteorologist (top of Ishigaki Observatory, Okinawa)
- Known for: Proposal that all buildings in typhoon-prone Ishigaki be built in concrete. Discovery of many animals such as Iwasaki Kusazemi. Studies on local history

Takuji Iwasaki (岩崎 卓爾, Iwasaki Takuji; November 17, 1869 – May 2, 1937) was a Japanese meteorologist, biologist, ethnologist historian. He was a meteorologist at the Ishigaki Weather Station, Ishigaki, Okinawa Prefecture. Initially, when weather forecasting was in its infancy, he had been badly criticized by local people when his forecast of a typhoon was incorrect. Nevertheless, his work as a meteorologist was better understood by locals later in his career, which endeared him to people.

== Other names ==
Takuji was also known as 糸数原主人袋風荘主人,蝶仙、蝶翁. He was also called "天文屋の御主前" (tenbunyah no ushumai), meaning master of the weather observatory, or nahbera no ushumai (literal: master of sponge cucumber).

== Life ==
Takuji was born on October 17, 1869, to a family of samurai in Sendai, a city in the Miyagi Prefecture. He discontinued high school and became a trainee at the Central Meteorological Station (now the Japan Meteorological Agency). He also worked at the weather stations of Nemuro and Sapporo. Takuji was stationed at the Ishigaki Weather Observatory (now Ishigaki Weather Station) in the Yaeyama Islands 1899 when he married. In 1900, he became the second director of the observatory, and had remained in Ishigaki until his death.

While he was stationed at the observatory in Ishigaki, Takuji studied various unrelated fields including society, traditions, and natural sciences related to Ishigaki. He became the director of Yaeyama Library, which later became the Yaeyama branch of the Okinawa Prefectural Library. He started the first kindergarten on the island, and took part in a venture enterprise of culturing black pearls in Kabira Bay with Mikimoto Kōkichi. One of Takuji's weaknesses was language. He only spoke a Sendai dialect, and up until his death, conversation with local people was very difficult.

In 1932, Takuji retired from the Ishigaki Observatory but remained as a part-time worker. Then living in Tonoshiro, Ishigaki, he named his house "Fukurokaze Soh". He died there on May 2, 1937, at the age of 69.

In 2001, Takuji was made an honorary citizen of Ishigaki.

== Achievements ==
Takuji proposed that all buildings in typhoon-prone Ishigaki Island be built in concrete, including his observatory. This became a reality in 1915, and now almost all buildings in Ishigaki are erected in concrete. He observed every typhoon which hit Ishigaki Island, and during one storm in 1914, a small stone hit his right eye and he lost his sight in that eye.

Takuji has been famous for his studies in the fields of biology. With the help of scholars such as Yasushi Nawa and Matsutoshi Matsumura, many new species were discovered, including several species called Iwasaki in Japanese.

As for insects, Takuji discovered and named Iwasaki Ootoge Kamemushi, Iwasaki Kamemushi, Iwasaki Kusazemi, Iwasaki Kinsuji Kamikiri, Iwasaki Konoha, Iwasaki Shirocho, Iwasaki Zemi, Iwasaki Himeharuzemi, Iwasaki Herikamemushi, and Iwasaki Kusazemi. He also bred butterflies such as Oogomadara (Idea leuconoe) and Konoha Cho, and observed their behaviour. The Japanese name Oogomadara means "paper kite" or the "rice paper butterfly", and is known especially for its presence in butterfly greenhouses and live butterfly expositions. The paper kite butterfly has its origins in Southeast Asia.

Snakes named in honor of Takuji include Iwasaki Sedaka Hebi (Pareas iwasakii) and Iwasaki Wamon Beni Hebi (Calliophis macclellandi iwasakii). He bred the poisonous Sakishima habu (Trimeresurus elegans) and devised ways to cope with the snake.

Takuji had collected a number of folklore and local songs, and tried to introduce the culture of Ishigaki Island through Yanagita Kunio and Orikuchi Shinobu.

== Sources ==
- Takuji Iwasaki, in Japanese
- Great Men in Okinawa, in Japanese
- 台風の島に生きる‐石垣島の先覚者岩崎卓爾 谷真介 偕成社 1976年
- 風の御主前／小説・岩崎卓爾伝 大城立裕 角川書店 1977年(発表は1974年)
- ゲッチョ昆虫記 盛口満 どうぶつ社 2007年 ISBN 978-4-88622-336-4
