= Sinomicrurus kelloggi =

Conservation status
- Least Concern (IUCN 3.1)

Scientific classification
- Kingdom: Animalia
- Phylum: Chordata
- Class: Reptilia
- Order: Squamata
- Suborder: Serpentes
- Family: Elapidae
- Genus: Sinomicrurus
- Species: S. kelloggi

Binomial name
- Sinomicrurus kelloggi (Pope, 1928)

Synonyms
- Hemibungarus kelloggi Pope, 1928; Calliophis wongii Fan, 1931; Callophis kelloggi — M.A. Smith, 1943; Calliophis kelloggi — Ding & Zheng, 1974; Micrurus kelloggi — Welch, 1994; Sinomicrurus kelloggi — Slowinski, Boundy & Lawson, 2001

Species of snake

Sinomicrurus kelloggi, also known commonly as Kellog's coral snake or Kellogg's coral snake, is a species of venomous snake in the family Elapidae. The species is native to Southeast Asia.

== Etymology ==
The specific name, kelloggi, is in honor of Claude Rupert Kellogg who was a zoologist and Christian missionary in China.

== Geographic range ==
S. kelloggi is found in Vietnam, northern Laos, and southern China.

== Habitat ==
The preferred natural habitat of S. kelloggi is forest, at altitudes of 300–1,128 m (984–3,701 ft).

== Description ==
The holotype of S. kelloggi measures 774 mm (30.5 in), of which 70 mm (2.8 in) consist of the tail. This species has a black head, which has a white V-shaped spot. The dorsum is purple-brown with 22 black transverse markings with light rims. The venter is milky white with 49 black marks of variable size.

== Behavior ==
S. kelloggi is terrestrial and nocturnal.

== Diet ==
S. kelloggi preys upon small lizards and small snakes.

== Reproduction ==
S. kelloggi is oviparous.
