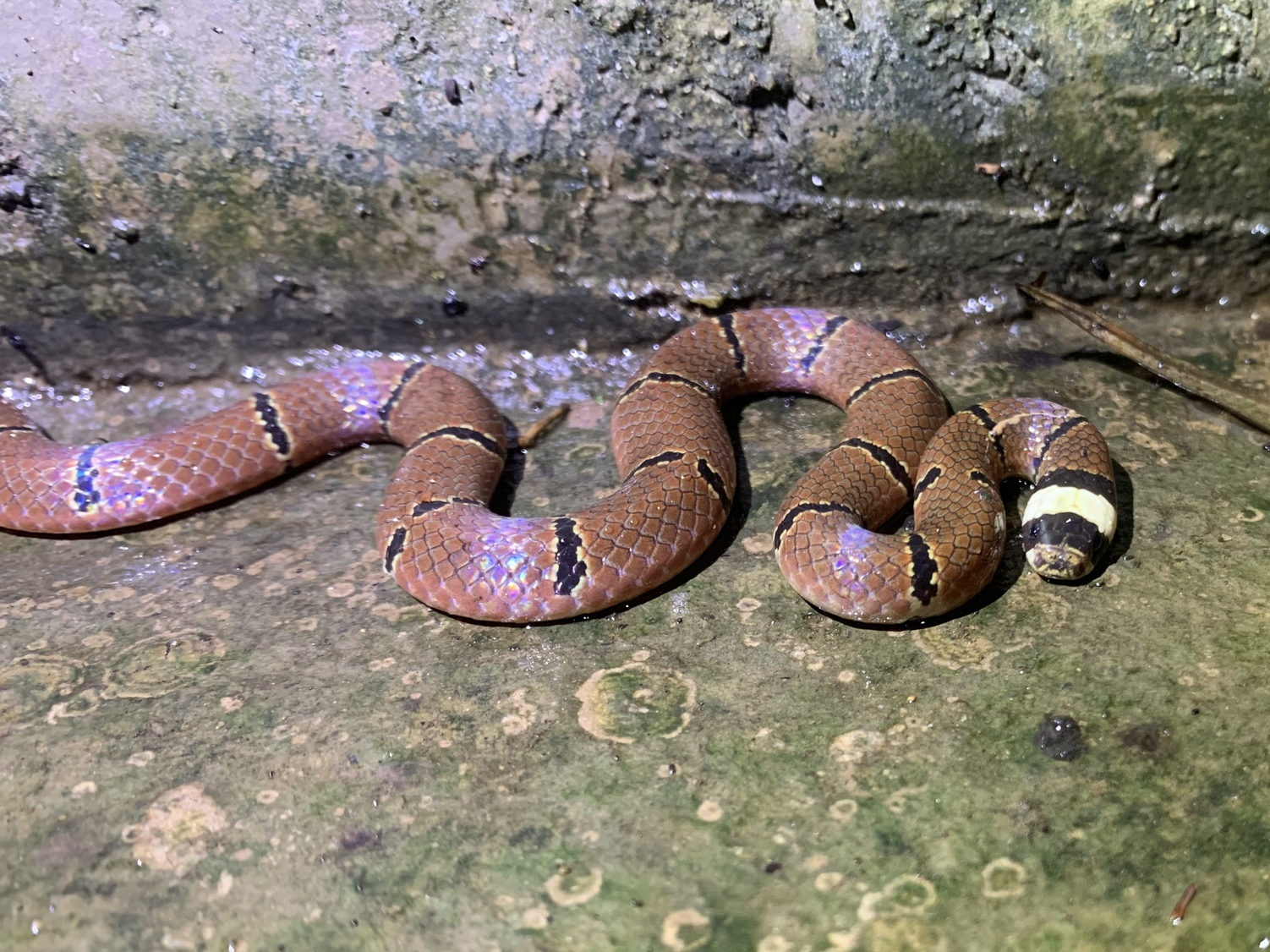

Conservation status
- Least Concern (IUCN 3.1)

Scientific classification
- Kingdom: Animalia
- Phylum: Chordata
- Class: Reptilia
- Order: Squamata
- Suborder: Serpentes
- Family: Elapidae
- Genus: Sinomicrurus
- Species: S. macclellandi

Binomial name
- Sinomicrurus macclellandi (J.T. Reinhardt, 1844)

Synonyms
- Elaps macclellandi J.T. Reinhardt, 1844; Calliophis macclellandii [sic] — Stejneger, 1907; Callophis maclellandii [sic] – Wall, 1908; Hemibungarus macclellandi — Golay et al., 1993; Micrurus macclellandi — Welch, 1994; Sinomicrurus macclellandi — Slowinski et al., 2001

= Sinomicrurus macclellandi =

Species of snake

Sinomicrurus macclellandi, commonly known as MacClelland's coral snake, is a species of venomous snake in the family Elapidae. The species is native to southern and eastern Asia. There are three recognized subspecies.

== Etymology ==
The specific name, macclellandi, is in honor of John McClelland, a physician and naturalist, who worked for the East India Company.

== Description ==
Sinomicrurus macclellandi is a small snake, about 40–80 centimetres (16–31 in) in total length (tail included), and has a thin body. Dorsally, it is reddish-brown, with thin, black cross bars, and its belly is creamy white. The head is small, round and black in color, with a broad, creamy white transverse band, and black outlines at the middle of the head. The dorsal scales on the body are smooth, and they are arranged, at midbody, in 13 parallel longitudinal rows.

== Geographic range ==
Sinomicrurus macclellandi is found in northern and northeastern India, Bangladesh, Bhutan, Nepal, northern Myanmar, Thailand, Vietnam, central and southern China (including Hong Kong, Hainan, north to Gansu and Shaanxi), Taiwan, and the Ryukyu Islands (Japan). It is also found in Laos. It has been recorded from elevations of 150–2,483 m (492–8,146 ft).

== Subspecies ==
Three subspecies are recognized as being valid, including the nominate subspecies:

- Sinomicrurus macclellandi macclellandi (J.T. Reinhardt, 1844)
- Sinomicrurus macclellandi nigriventer (Wall, 1908) – India (Himachal Pradesh, Uttarakhand)
- Sinomicrurus macclellandi univirgatus (Günther, 1858) – Nepal, India (Sikkim

== Behavior and habitat ==
Sinomicrurus macclellandi is mainly nocturnal and terrestrial. It occurs in forest litter, hillside, and lowland. It is often found hiding under leaves. Although this is a venomous species, it is quite docile and not likely to strike actively.

== Diet ==
Sinomicrurus macclellandi preys on small reptiles, such as lizards and snakes.

== Venom ==
Like other elapids, Sinomicrurus macclellandi possesses a potent neurotoxic venom, which is capable of killing a person. Bite symptoms include numbness of lips and difficulty of speech and breathing, followed by blurred vision. Severe bite victims may die of instant heart failure, although there have been only a few human deaths recorded in Thailand.

== Reproduction ==
Sinomicrurus macclellandi is an oviparous species. Mature females lay clutches of 6–14 eggs.
