= List of lizards of Colombia =

The 238 lizard species found in Colombia represent 13 families.

== Corytophanidae ==
Helmeted or Casquehead Lizards
Scientific name	Common name	Distribution	Status
Basiliscus basiliscus	Common Basilisk	Pacific lowlands (to 400 m), Caribbean lowlands (to 1200 m), Inter-Andean valleys (to 1200 m)	
Basiliscus galeritus	Western or Red-headed Basilisk	Pacific lowlands, Gorgona Island, Inter-Andean valleys; forested areas (to 1600 m)	
Basiliscus vittatus	Brown Basilisk	Northwest lowlands adjacent to Panama	unsure distribution in Colombia
Corytophanes cristatus	Helmeted Iguana	Caribbean & Pacific lowlands in the north and northwest (600 - 800 m)	

== Hoplocercidae ==
Dwarf & Spinytail Iguanas, Wood Lizards
Scientific name	Common name	Distribution	Status
Enyalioides cofanorum	Cofan Wood Lizard; Duellman's Dwarf Iguana	Amazon basin	
Enyalioides heterolepis	Bocourt's Dwarf Iguana	Pacific lowlands, Gorgona Island	
Enyalioides laticeps	Amazon or Brown-headed Wood Lizard; Guichenot's Dwarf Iguana	Amazon basin	
Enyalioides microlepis	Brown or Small-scaled Wood Lizard; Tiny-scale Dwarf Iguana	Amazon basin	
Enyalioides oshaughnessyi	Red-eyed Wood Lizard; O'Shaughnessy's Dwarf Iguana	Pacific lowlands (southern part)	
Enyalioides praestabilis	Blue-spotted Wood Lizard	Southern Colombia (200–2000 m)	
Morunasaurus annularis	Ringed Spinytail Iguana; Ringed Manticores	2 records: Puerto Asís, Putumayo (240 m) & Churumbelos, Cauca (1100 m)	
Morunasaurus groi	Dunn's Spinytail Iguana; Gro's Manticores	West slope of West Andes in Antioquia (700 - 805 m)	

== Iguanidae ==
Iguanas
Scientific name	Common name	Distribution	Status
Ctenosaura similis	Black or Black Spinytail Iguana	San Andrés and Providencia Islands	
Iguana iguana	Green Iguana	Amazon region, Caribbean and Pacific coastal regions, Inter-Andean valleys	

== Dactyloidae ==
Anole Lizards
Scientific name	Common name	Distribution	Status
Anolis binotatus	Two-marked Anole	Pacific lowlands	
Anolis radulinus	-	Northwest Colombia (Truando River, Chocó)	Endemic
Anolis aequatorialis	Equatorial Anole	Western foothills of West Andes (1343 – 2250 m)	
Anolis agassizi	Malpelo Anole	Malpelo Island	Endemic
Anolis anchicayae	Anchicayá Anole	Anchicayá River, Bajo Calima, Bahía Solano	Endemic
Anolis anoriensis	Anorí Anole	Central Andes in Antioquia	Endemic
Anolis antioquiae	Antioquia Anole	Western Antioquia, 2200-2300m	Endemic
Anolis apollinaris	Boulenger's Anole	Magdalena River valley (200 – 1300 m)	
Anolis calimae	Ayala's Anole	West Andes in Valle, Risaralda, & Caldas (>1500 m)	Endemic
Anolis caquetae	Caquetá Anole	Caquetá (Upper Apaporis River)	Endemic
Anolis chloris	Boulenger's Green Anole	Pacific lowlands	
Anolis chocorum	Chocó Anole	Pacific lowlands, Gorgona Island (20 – 700 m)	
Anolis danieli	Daniel's Anole	Antioquia (Urrao)	Endemic
Anolis eulaemus	Good Anole	West Andes from Risaralda south (1300 – 2400 m)	
Anolis fasciatus	Banded Anole	Gorgona Island	
Anolis fitchi	Fitch's Anole	Putumayo (250 - 2000 m)	
Anolis fraseri	Fraser's Anole	Pacific lowlands & upper slopes of the West Andes	
Anolis frenatus	Bridled or Giant Anole	Caribbean lowlands (to 900 m)	
Anolis gemmosus	O'Shaughnessy's Anole	Western foothills of West Andes in Nariño (1300 – 2500 m)	
Anolis gorgonae	Blue Anole	Gorgona Island	Endemic
Anolis heterodermus	Flat Andes Anole	High Andes	Endemic
Anolis huilae	Huila Anole	Central Andes (Huila, Tolima)	Endemic
Anolis inderenae	-	East Andes	Endemic
Anolis jacare	Jacare Anole	East Andes (Norte de Santander), 1400–2000 m	
Anolis lamari	-	East slope of Central Andes	Endemic
Anolis latifrons	-	Pacific lowlands, to 600 m	
Anolis limon	-	Northwest Colombia (Chocó)	
Anolis maculigula	Rueda's Anole	Northwest Colombia (Antioquia & Chocó), to 850 m	Endemic; Vulnerable
Anolis megalopithecus	Ruida's Anole	West slope of West Andes (Antioquia), 1900–2300 m	Endemic
Anolis menta	Mixed Anole	Santa Marta Mountains	Endemic
Anolis mirus	-	Pacific lowlands & foothills (Southwest), to 1500 m	Endemic
Anolis nicefori	Niceforo's Andes Anole	Perijá Mountains	
Anolis paravertebralis	-	Santa Marta Mountains	
Anolis peraccae	-	Pacific lowlands (Southwest)	
Anolis princeps	First Anole	Pacific lowlands (Southwest), Gorgona Island	
Anolis propinquus	-	Western Colombia (Calima River)	Endemic
Anolis punctatus	Spotted Anole	Amazon basin	
Anolis purpurescens	Purple Anole	Northwest Colombia (Truando River, Chocó)	
Anolis rivalis	Neighbor Anole	Northwest Colombia (Antioquia, Chocó)	Endemic
Anolis ruizi	-	East Andes (Boyacá)	Endemic
Anolis santamartae	Santa Marta Anole	Santa Marta Mountains	Endemic
Anolis solitarius	Solitary Anole	Santa Marta Mountains	Endemic
Anolis transversalis	Banded Tree Anole	Amazon basin	
Anolis umbrivagus	-	Santa Marta Mountains	
Anolis vaupesianus	Williams' Anole	Amazon basin (Vaupés)	Endemic
Anolis ventrimaculatus	Speckled Anole	Pacific slope of West Andes (Valle del Cauca, Antioquia, Chocó), 1300–2500 m	Endemic; Near Threatened
Anolis antonii	Anton's Anole	West & Central Andes, above 1000 m	Endemic
Anolis auratus	Grass Anole	Caribbean & Orinoquia regions, Inter-Andean valleys, to 1800 m	
Anolis biporcatus	Neotropical Green Anole	Caribbean & Pacific lowlands	
Anolis concolor	San Andrés Anole	San Andrés Island	Endemic
Anolis fuscoauratus	Brown-eared Anole	Amazon & Orinoquia regions	
Anolis gracilipes	Charm Anole	Pacific lowlands, 20–700 m	
Anolis granuliceps	Granular Anole	Pacific lowlands, to 550 m	
Anolis ibague	Ibague Anole	Tolima	Endemic
Anolis lemurinus	Ghost Anole	Northwest Colombia	
Anolis lynchi	Lynch's Anole	Southwest Colombia (Cauca)	
Anolis lyra	-	Pacific lowlands	
Anolis macrolepis	Big-scaled Anole	Pacific lowlands	Endemic
Anolis maculiventris	Blotchbelly Anole	Pacific lowlands (Southwest)	
Anolis mariarum	Blemished Anole	West & Central Andes, over 1200 m	Endemic
Anolis medemi	-	Gorgona Island	Endemic
Anolis notopholis	Scalyback Anole	Pacific lowlands	Endemic
Anolis onca	Bulky Anole	Guajira peninsula	
Anolis ortonii	Bark Anole	Amazon basin	
Anolis pentaprion	Lichen Anole	Northwest Colombia (Truando River, Chocó)	
Anolis pinchoti	Crab Cay Anole	Providencia Island	Endemic
Anolis poecilopus	Dappled Anole	Northwest Colombia (Truando River, Chocó)	
Anolis rivalis	Neighbor Anole	Northwest Colombia (West Antioquia, Chocó)	Endemic
Anolis scypheus	-	Amazon basin	
Anolis sulcifrons	Grooved Anole	Central & East Andes	
Anolis tolimensis	Tolima Anole	Central & East Andes, Inter-Andean Valleys, 1000–2300 m	Endemic
Anolis trachyderma	Roughskin Anole	Amazon basin	
Anolis tropidogaster	Tropical Anole	Inter-Andean Valleys, Caribbean region, 1000–2000 m	
Anolis vicarius	-	West Andes (Antioquia)	Endemic
Anolis vittigerus	Garland Anole	Pacific lowlands	Endemic
Polychrus gutturosus	Berthold's Bush Anole	Pacific lowlands	
Polychrus marmoratus	Many-colored Bush Anole	East slope of East Andes, Amazon & Orinoquia regions, Magdalena River Valley, to 1800 m	

== Tropiduridae ==
Neotropical Ground Lizards
Scientific name	Common name	Distribution	Status
Plica plica	Tree Runner	Amazon basin	
Plica umbra	Blue-lipped Tree Lizard	Amazon & Orinoquia regions	
Stenocercus bolivarensis	Bolivar Whorltail Iguana	Cauca	Endemic
Stenocercus erythrogaster	-	Caribbean lowlands, Santa Marta Mountains, Magdalena River valley	Endemic
Stenocercus guentheri	Günther's Whorltail Iguana	West Andes (Nariño), 2135–3890 m	
Stenocercus iridescens	-	Pacific lowlands & foothills (Southwest)	
Stenocercus lache	-	East Andes (Boyacá), 3700–4000 m	Endemic
Stenocercus santander	-	Santander	Endemic
Stenocercus trachycephalus	Duméril's Whorltail Iguana	Cundinamarca	Endemic
Tropidurus torquatus	Amazon Lava Lizard	Amazon basin	
Uracentron azureum	Green Thornytail Iguana	Amazon & Orinoquia regions	
Uracentron flaviceps	Tropical Thornytail Lizard	Amazon basin	

=== Iguania Images ===
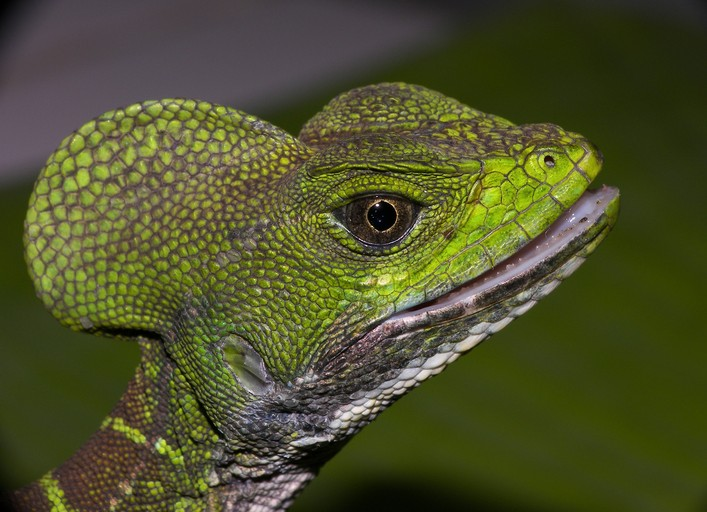
Common Basilisk (Basiliscus basiliscus)

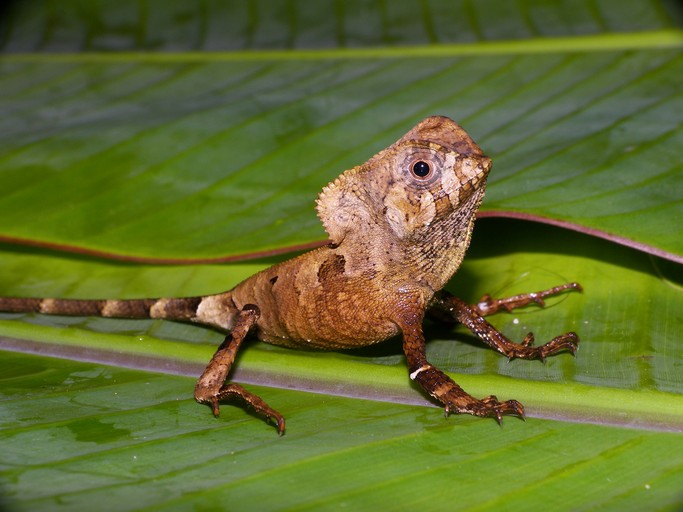
Helmeted Iguana (Corytophanes cristatus)

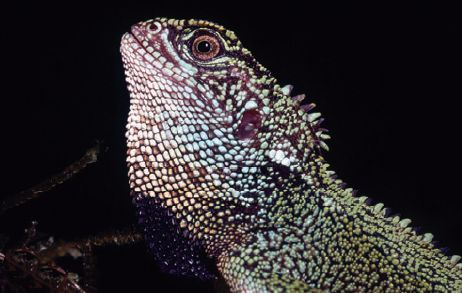
Blue-spotted Wood Lizard (Enyalioides praestabilis)

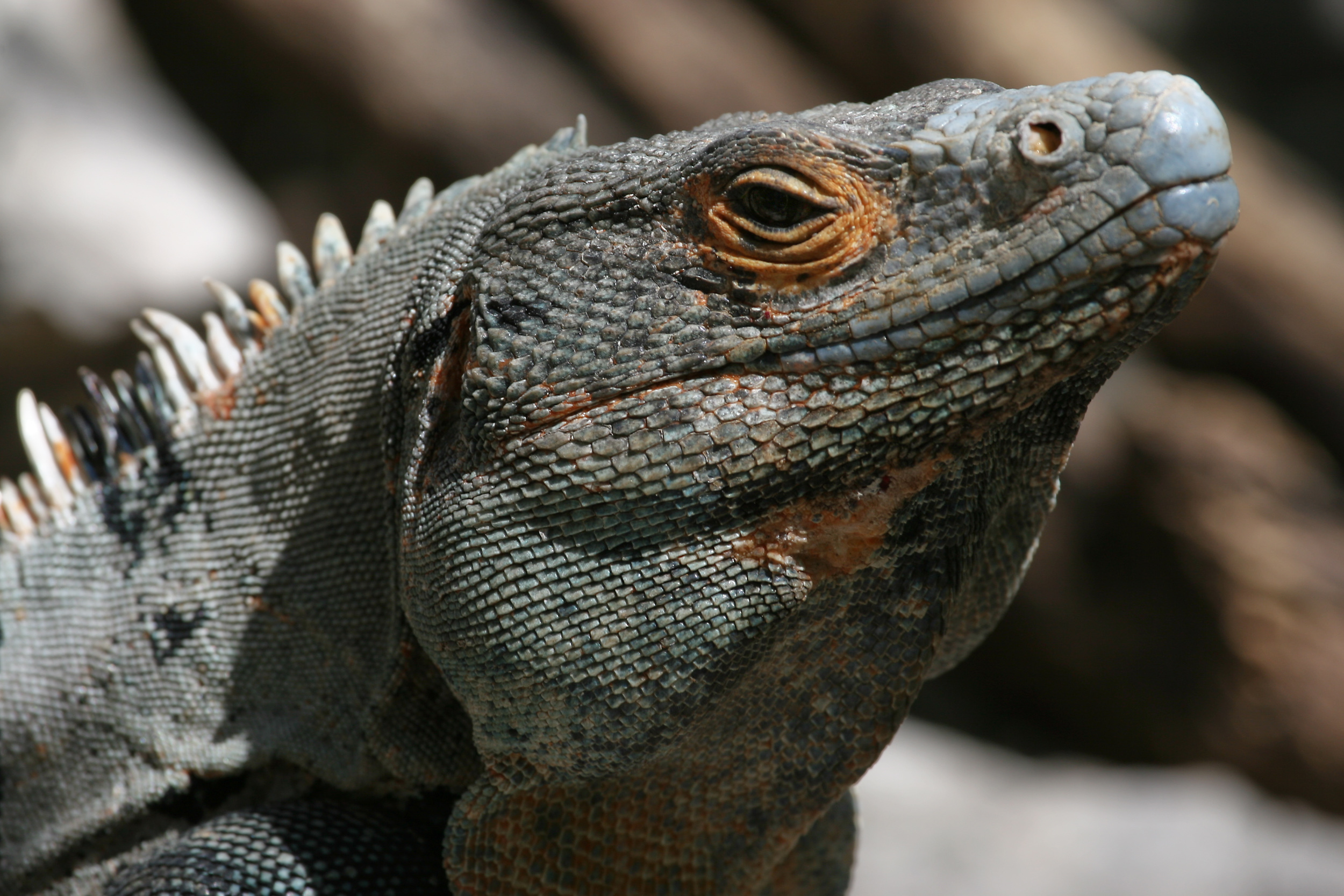
Black Iguana (Ctenosaura similis)

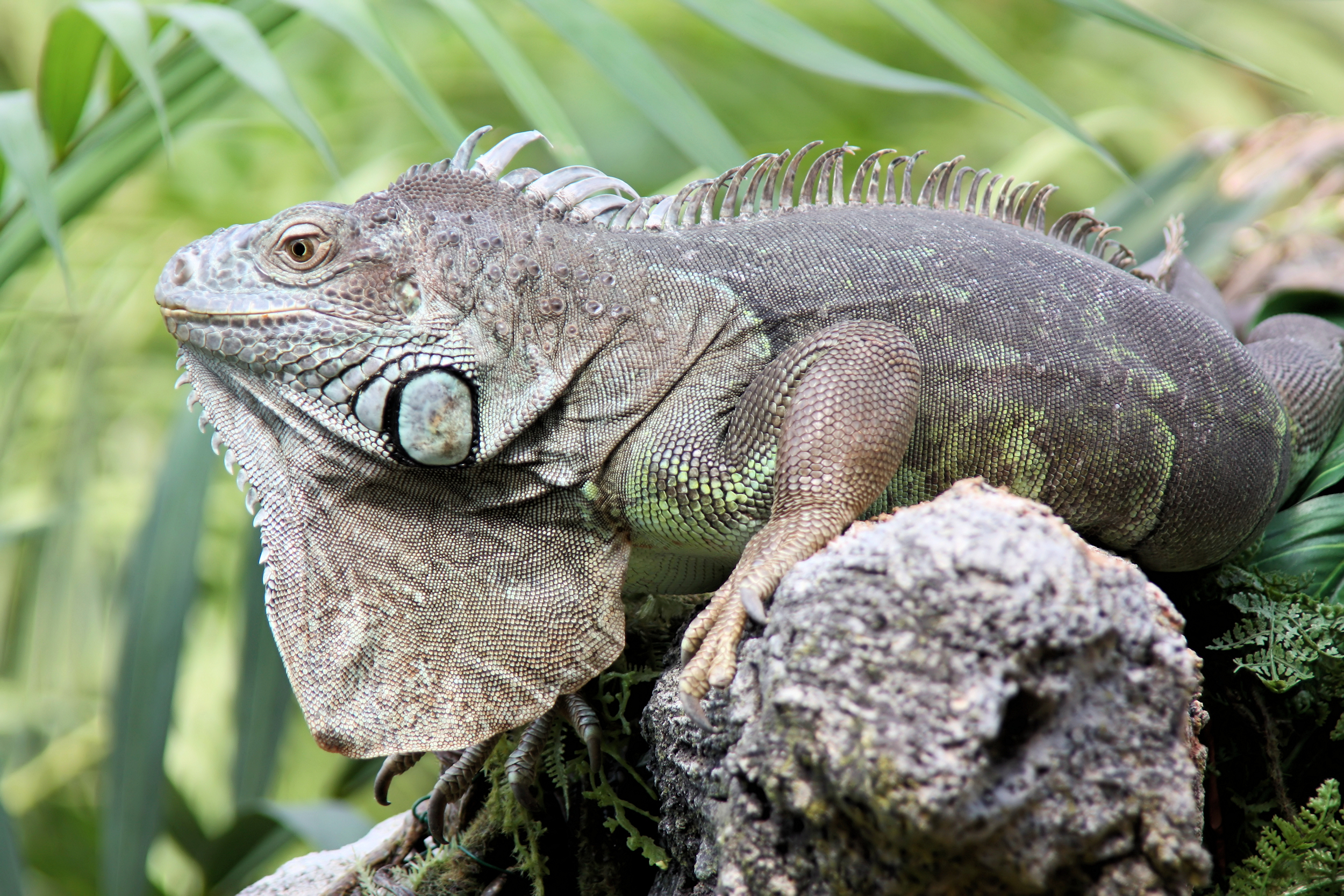
Green Iguana (Iguana iguana)

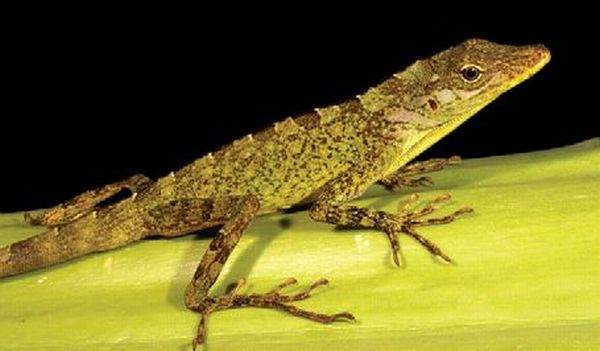
Fitch's Anole (Dactyloa fitchi)

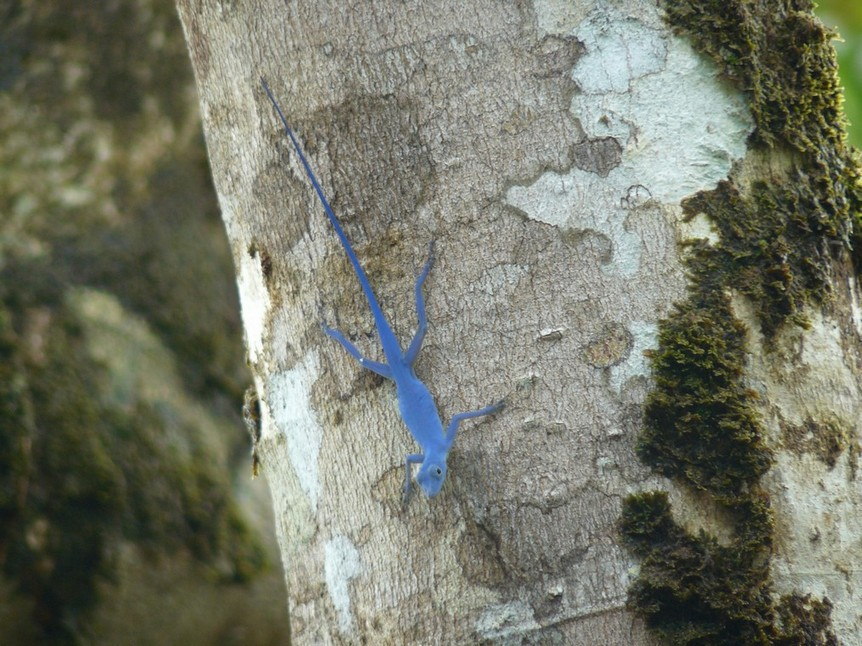
Blue Anole (Dactyloa gorgonae)

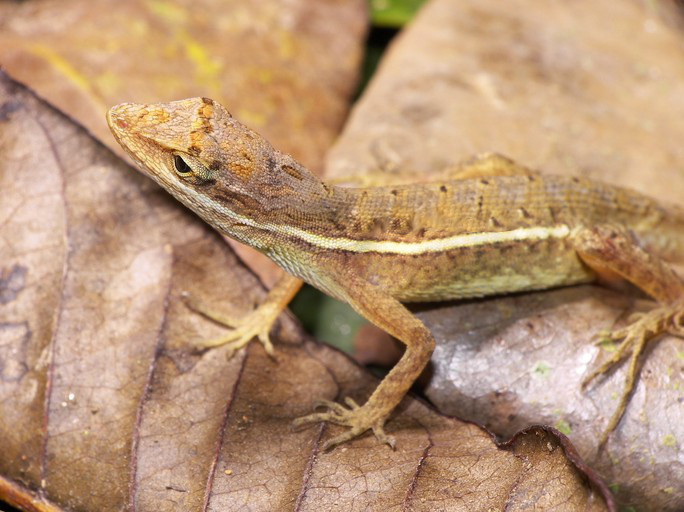
Grass Anole (Norops auratus)

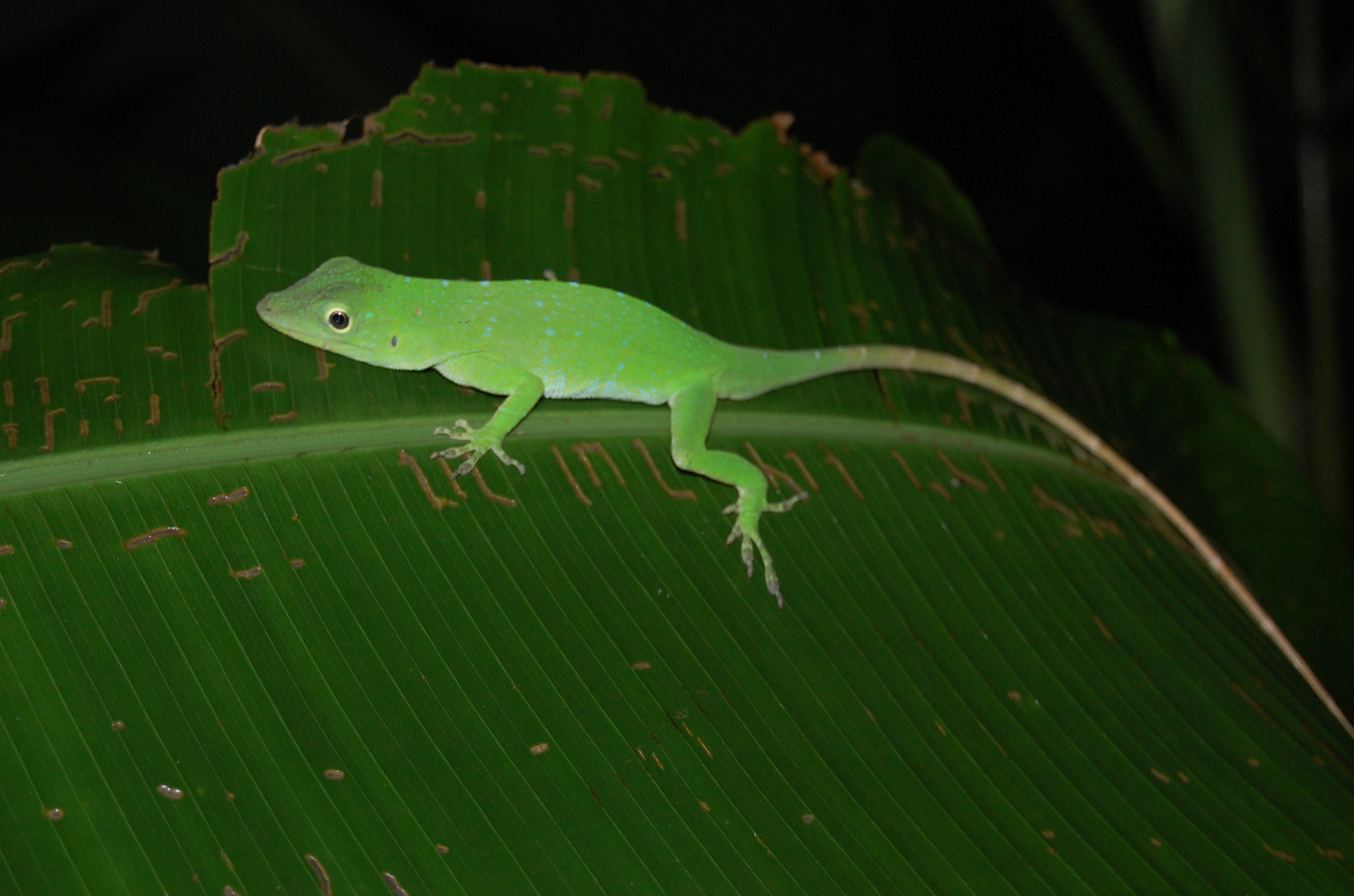
Neotropical Green Anole (Norops biporcatus)

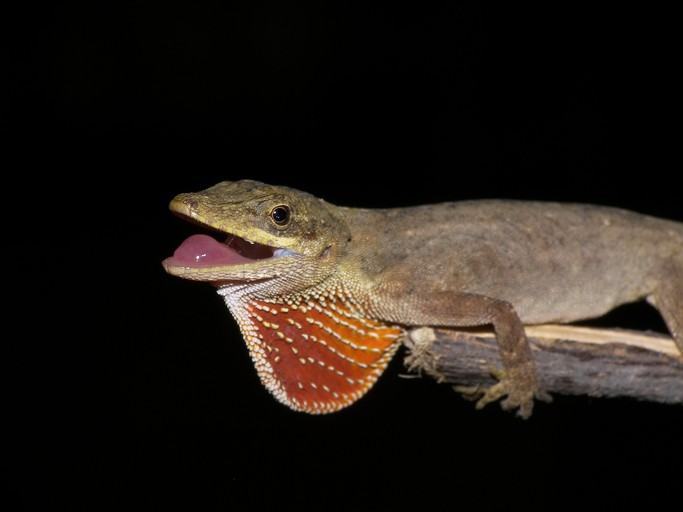
Blemished Anole (Norops mariarum)

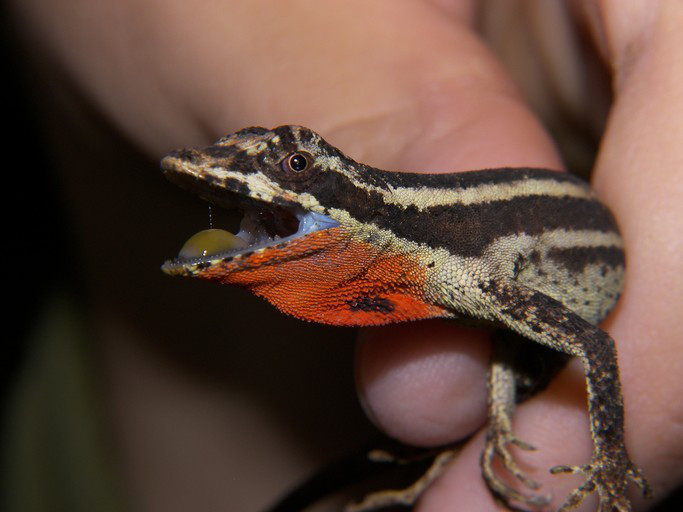
Garland Anole (Norops vittigerus)

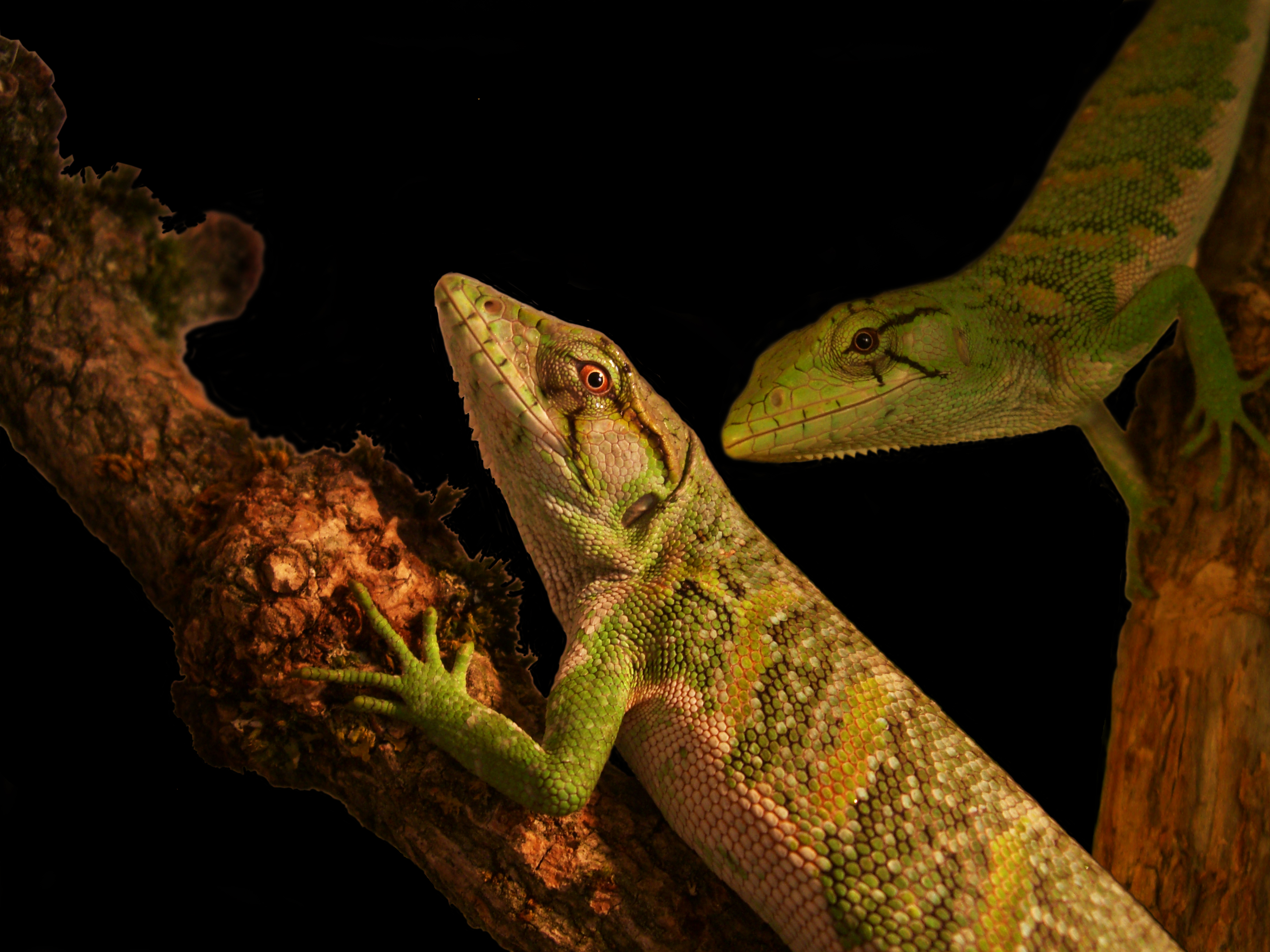
Many-colored Bush Anole (Polychrus marmoratus)

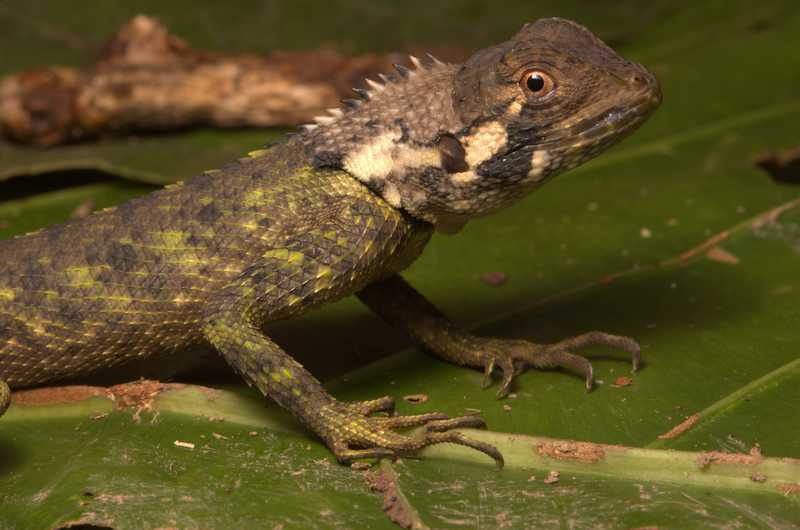
Blue-lipped Tree Lizard (Plica umbra)

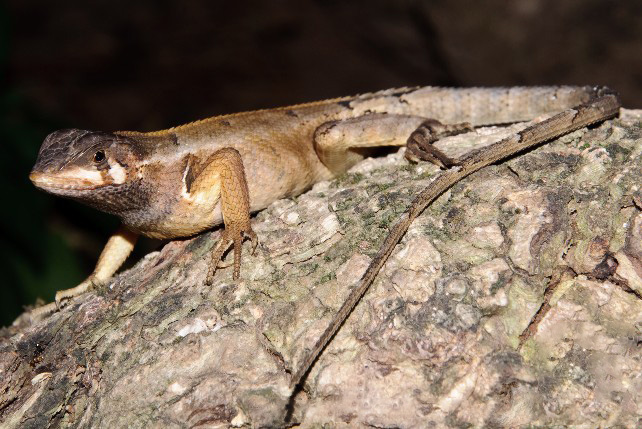
Stenocercus erythrogaster

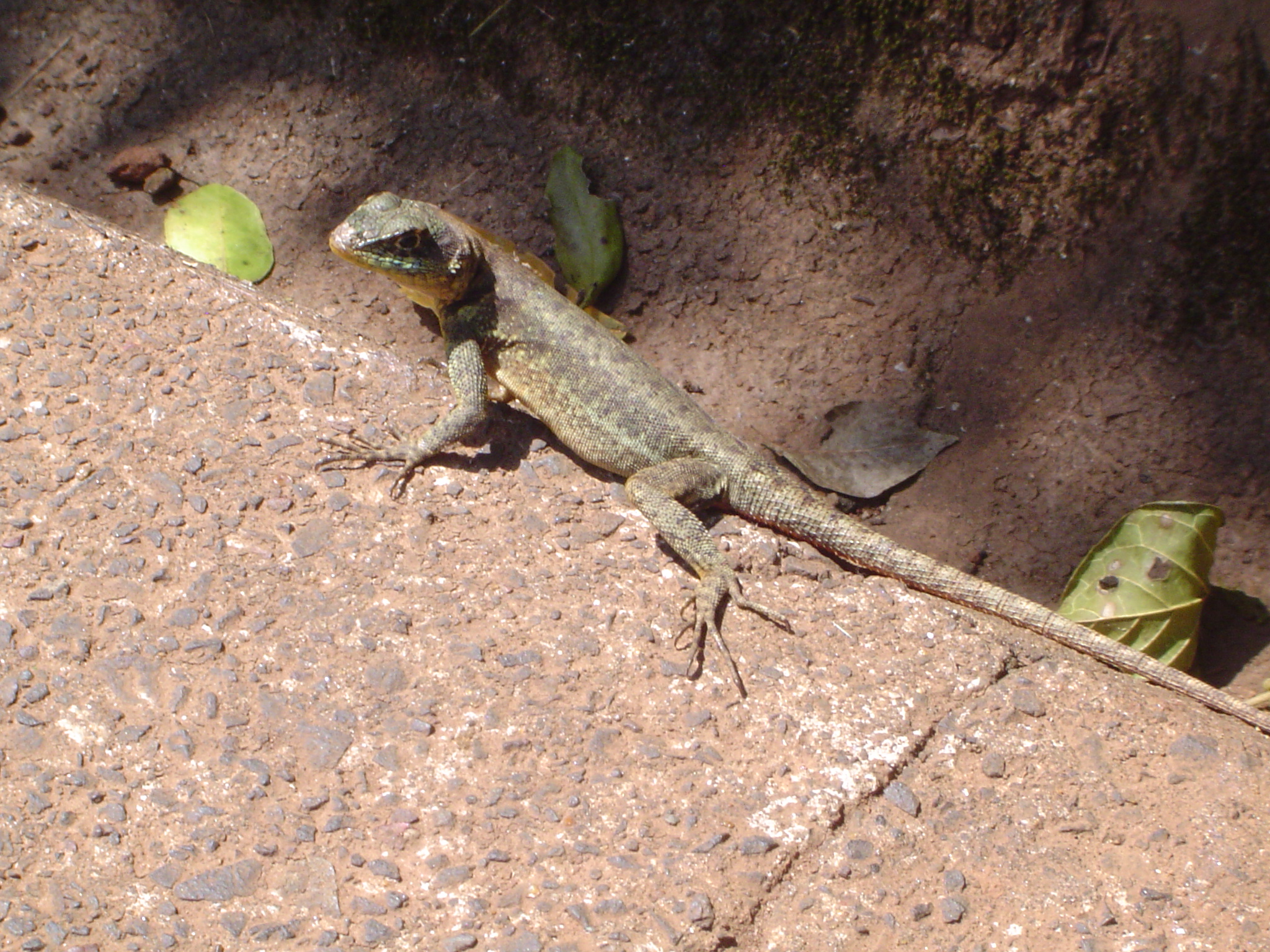
Amazon Lava Lizard (Tropidurus torquatus)

== Gekkonidae ==
Gekkonid Geckos
Scientific name	Common name	Distribution	Status
Hemidactylus brookii	Spotted House Gecko		Introduced
Hemidactylus frenatus	Common House Gecko		Introduced
Hemidactylus mabouia	Tropical House Gecko		Introduced
Hemidactylus palaichthus	Antilles Leaf-toed Gecko	Caribbean lowlands	
Lepidodactylus lugubris	Mourning Gecko		Introduced

== Sphaerodactylidae ==
Sphaerodactylid Geckos
Scientific name	Common name	Distribution	Status
Aristelliger georgeensis	St. George Island Gecko	San Andrés & Providencia Islands	
Gonatodes albogularis	Yellow-headed Gecko	Northern Colombia	
Gonatodes caudiscutatus	Shieldhead Gecko	Pacific & Caribbean lowlands	
Gonatodes concinnatus	Collared Gecko	Southern Colombia	
Gonatodes hasemani	Haseman's Gecko	Amazon basin (Vaupés)	
Gonatodes humeralis	Trinidad Gecko	East of Andes	
Gonatodes riveroi	-	East of Andes (Meta, Boyacá, Cundinamarca)	
Gonatodes vittatus	Wiegmann's Striped Gecko	Guajira	
Lepidoblepharis colombianus	Colombian Scaly-eyed Gecko	West slope of East Andes, 1600 m (Cundinamarca)	Endemic
Lepidoblepharis duolepis	Antioquia Scaly-eyed Gecko	Slopes above Cauca Valley (Valle del Cauca, Antioquia)	Endemic
Lepidoblepharis festae	Amazon Scaly-eyed Gecko	Amazon basin	
Lepidoblepharis intermedius	Lowland Scaly-eyed Gecko	Pacific lowlands (Southwest)	
Lepidoblepharis microlepis	-	Pacific lowlands	
Lepidoblepharis miyatai	Tiny Scaly-eyed Gecko	Caribbean lowlands (Magdalena)	Endemic
Lepidoblepharis peraccae	Peracca's Scaly-eyed Gecko	Southwest Colombia, 300 m	Endemic
Lepidoblepharis ruthveni	Ruthven's Scaly-eyed Gecko	Southwest Colombia	
Lepidoblepharis sanctaemartae	Panamanian Scaly-eyed Gecko	Caribbean lowlands, Orinoquia region	
Lepidoblepharis williamsi	-	Central Andes (Antioquia), 1800–2200 m	Endemic
Lepidoblepharis xanthostigma	Costa Rican Scaly-eyed Gecko	Northern Colombia, lower Cauca & Magdalena Valleys, to 1360 m	
Pseudogonatodes furvus	Colombian Clawed Gecko	Santa Marta Mountains	Endemic
Pseudogonatodes guianensis	Guyanese Clawed Gecko	Amazon & Orinoquia regions	
Pseudogonatodes peruvianus	Peruvian Clawed Gecko	Amazon basin	
Sphaerodactylus argus	Ocellated Gecko	San Andrés Island	
Sphaerodactylus heliconiae	-	Caribbean lowlands (Magdalena)	
Sphaerodactylus lineolatus	Panamanian Least Gecko	Northwest Colombia	
Sphaerodactylus scapularis	Boulenger's Least Gecko	Gorgona Island	

== Phyllodactylidae ==
Phyllodactylid Geckos
Scientific name	Common name	Distribution	Status
Phyllodactylus transversalis	Colombian Leaf-toed Gecko	Malpelo Island	Endemic
Phyllodactylus ventralis	Margarita Leaf-toed Gecko	Caribbean lowlands	
Thecadactylus rapicauda	Northern Turniptail Gecko	Throughout	
Thecadactylus solimoensis	Southern Turniptail Gecko	Amazon basin	

=== Gekkota Images ===
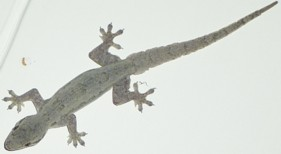
Common House Gecko (Hemidactylus frenatus)

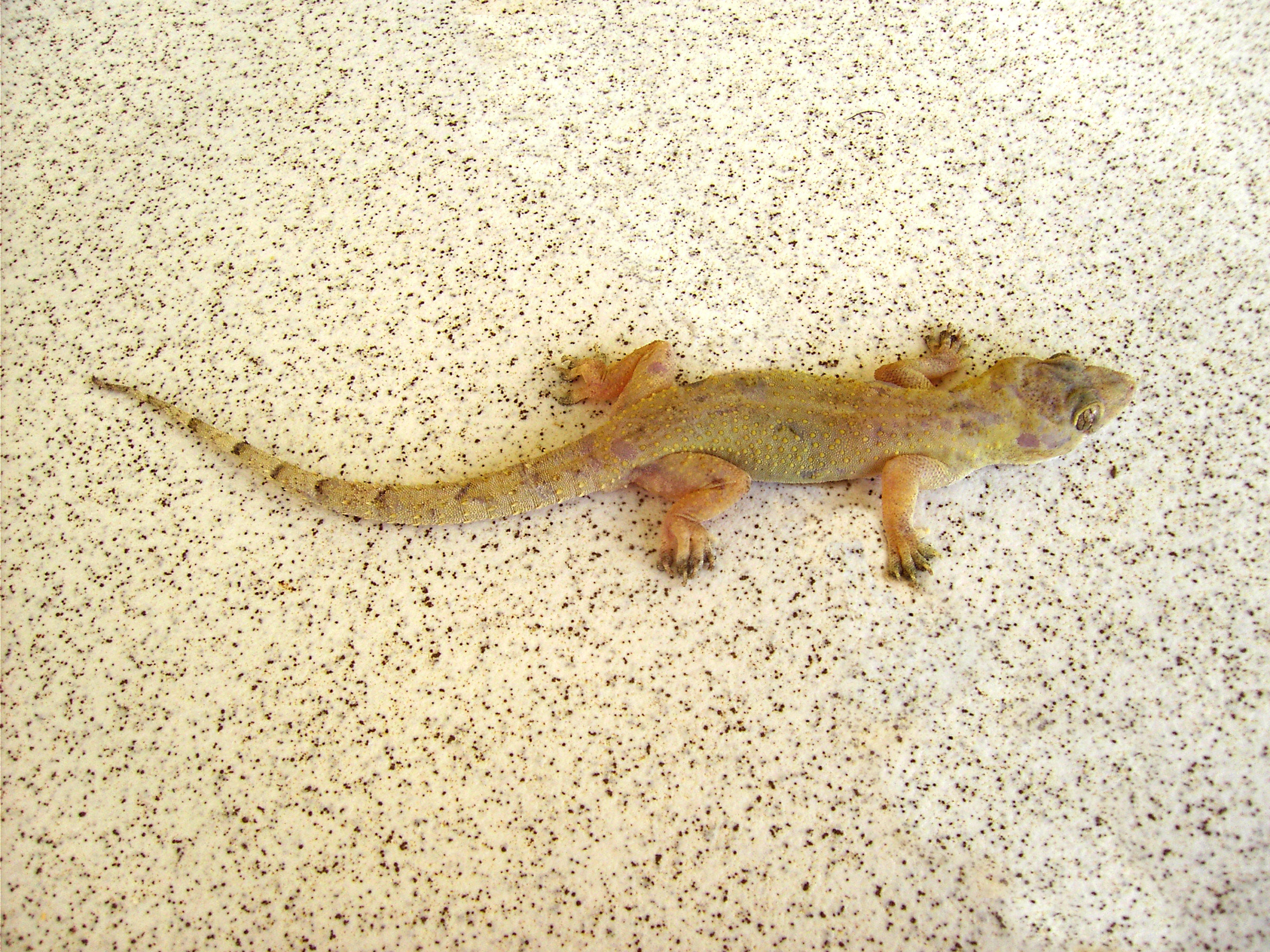
Tropical House Gecko (Hemidactylus mabouia)

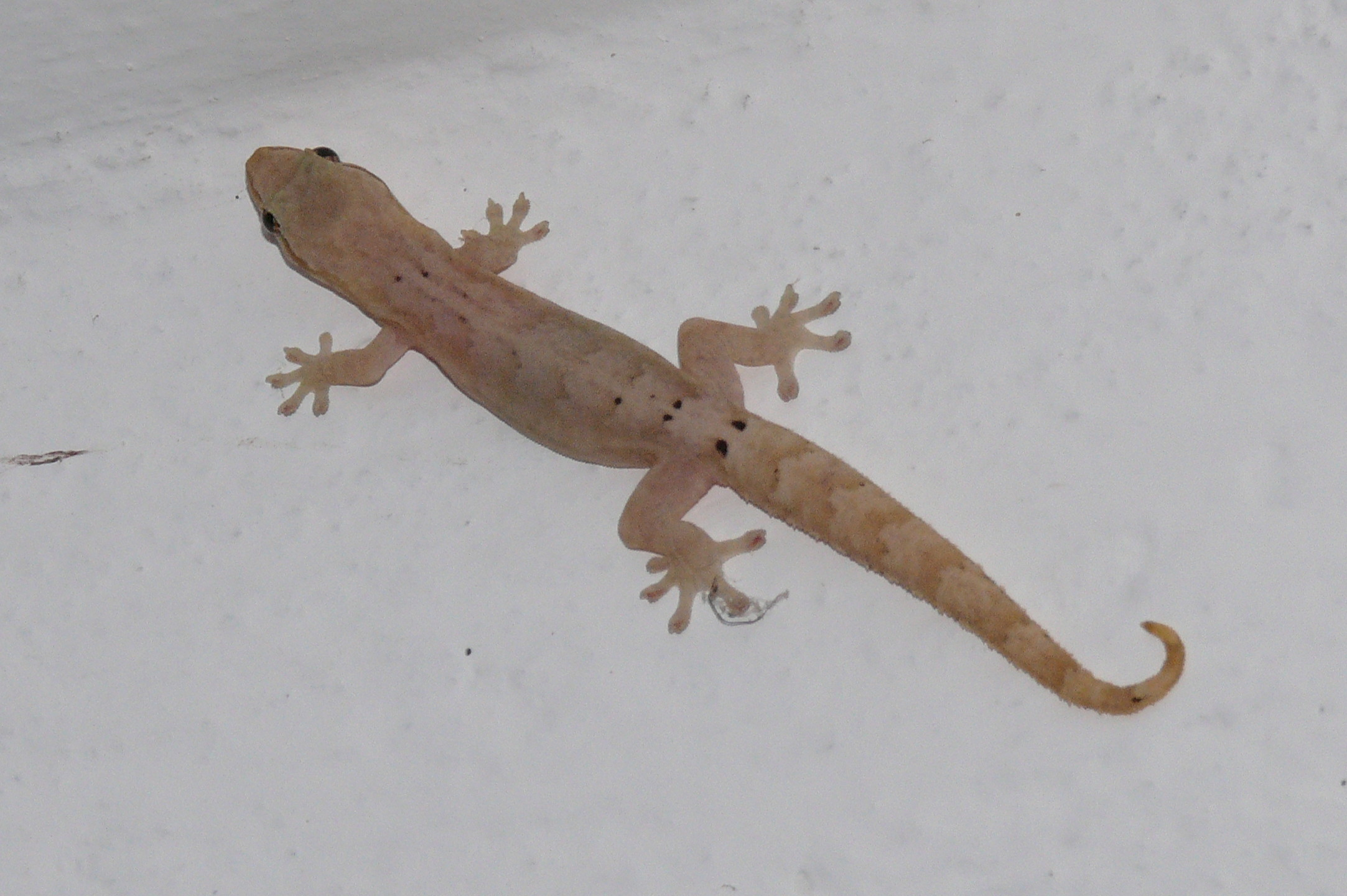
Mourning Gecko (Lepidodactylus lugubris)

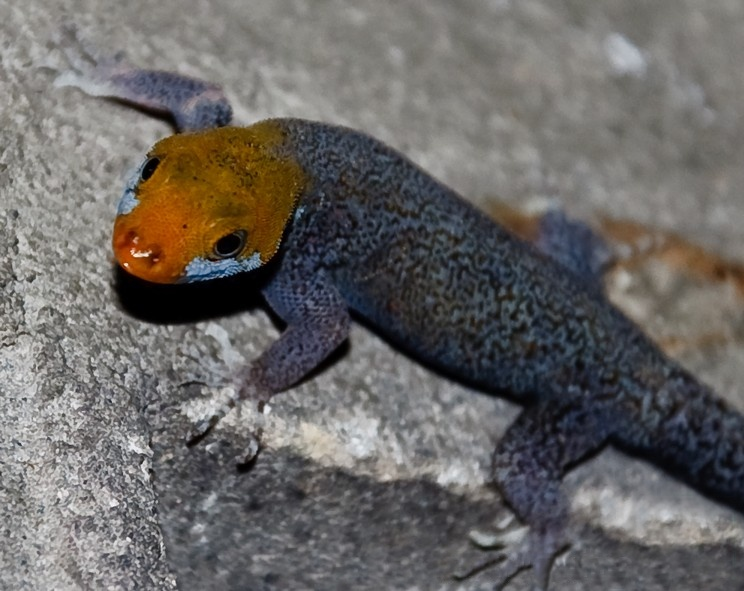
Yellow-headed Gecko (Gonatodes albogularis)

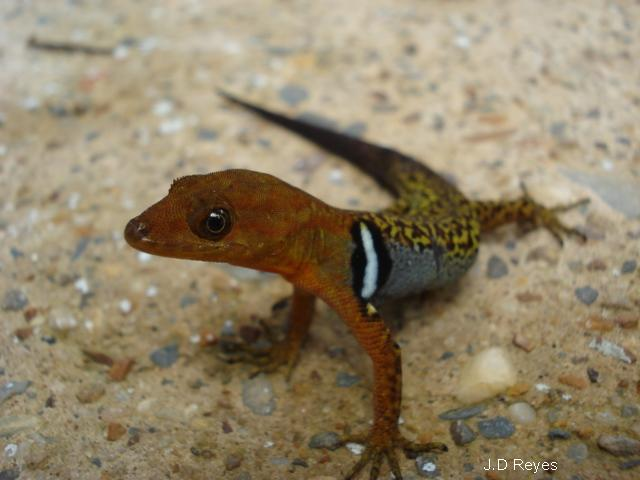
Collared Gecko (Gonatodes concinnatus)

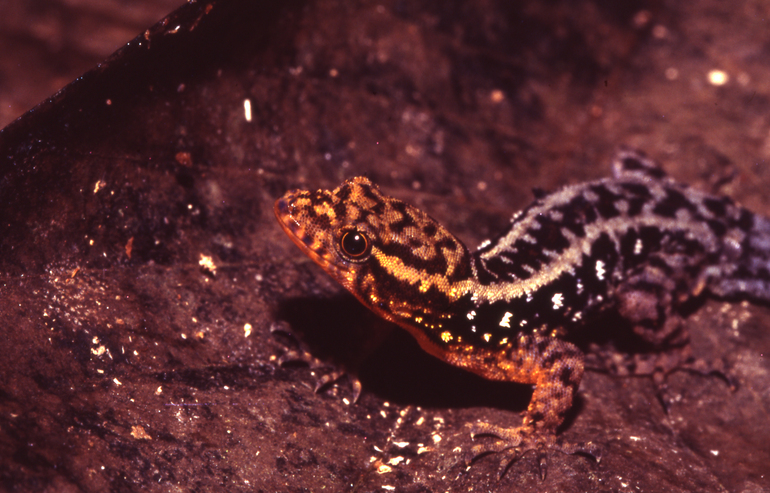
Haseman's Gecko (Gonatodes hasemani)

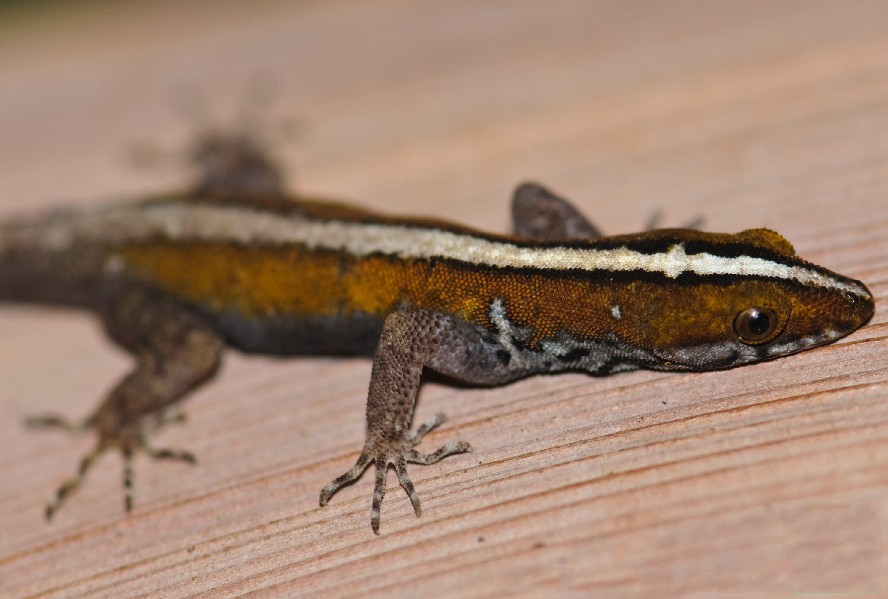
Wiegmann's Striped Gecko (Gonatodes vittatus)

== Amphisbaenidae ==
Worm Lizards
Scientific name	Common name	Distribution	Status
Amphisbaena alba	Red Worm Lizard	Amazon basin	
Amphisbaena amazonica	Amazon Worm Lizard	Amazon basin (Leticia)	
Amphisbaena fuliginosa	Speckled Worm Lizard	Pacific & Caribbean lowlands, Madalena Valley; dry & humid forest	
Amphisbaena medemi	-	Caribbean lowlands (Atlántico)	Endemic
Amphisbaena spurelli	Spirrelli's Worm Lizard	Pacific lowlands (Northern Chocó)	
Amphisbaena varia	-	Pacific & Caribbean lowlands, Orinoquia region (Meta)	

=== Amphisbaenia Images ===
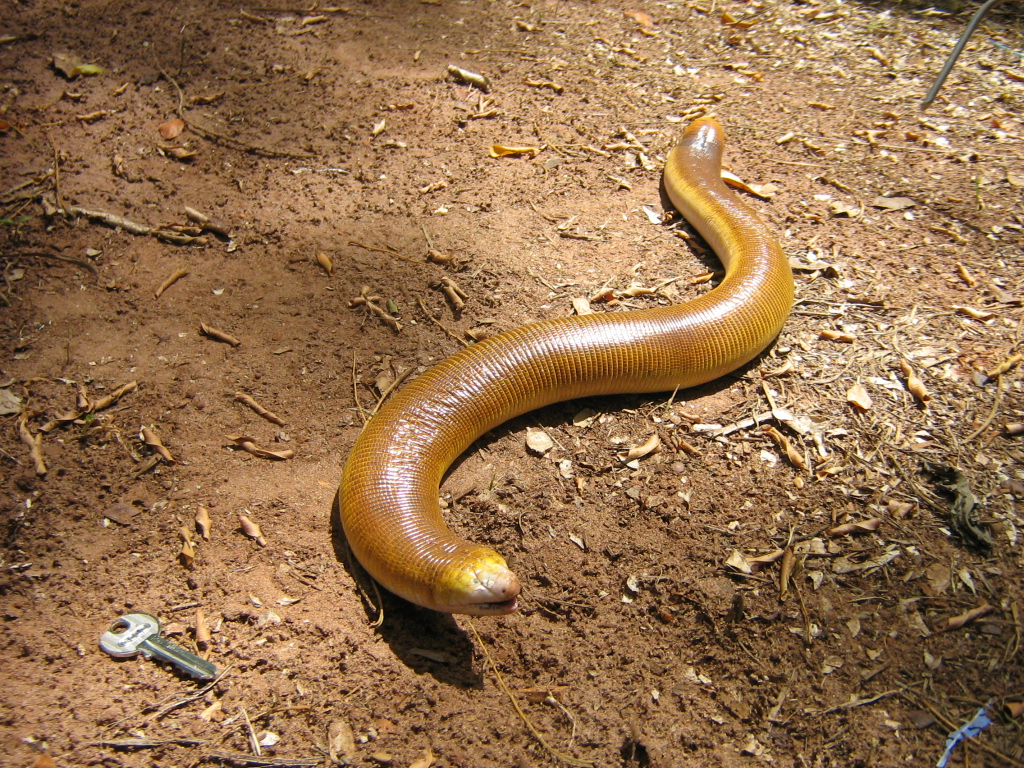
Red Worm Lizard (Amphisbaena alba)

== Anguidae ==
Galliwasps
Scientific name	Common name	Distribution	Status
Diploglossus millepunctatus	Dotted or Malpelo Galliwasp	Malpelo Island	Endemic
Diploglossus monotropis	Rainbow Stripe Galliwasp	Pacific & Caribbean lowlands, Magdalena River Valley	

== Gymnophthalmidae ==
Spectacled Lizards or Microteiids
Scientific name	Common name	Distribution	Status
Alopoglossus angulatus	Northern Teiid	Amazon basin	
Alopoglossus atriventris	Keel-bellied Shade Lizard	Amazon basin	
Alopoglossus buckleyi	Buckley's Teiid	Amazon basin	
Alopoglossus copii	-	Amazon basin	
Alopoglossus festae	-	Southwest Colombia, 10–770 m	
Alopoglossus lehmanni	-	Pacific lowlands (Valle del Cauca)	Endemic
Anadia altaserrania	-	Santa Marta Mountains	Endemic
Anadia bitaeniata	Two-banded Anadia	High East Andes along Venezuelan border	
Anadia bogotensis	Bogota Anadia	High East Andes (Cundinamarca, Boyacá)	Endemic
Anadia bumanguesa	-	Santander, 1000 m	Endemic
Anadia marmorata	Spotted Anadia	Caribbean lowlands	
Anadia ocellata	Bromeliad Lizard	Pacific lowlands	
Anadia pamplonensis	Pamplona Anadia	East Andes (Norte de Santander)	
Anadia pulchella	Ruthven's Anadia	Santa Marta Mountains	Endemic; Vulnerable
Anadia rhombifera	Rhombifer Anadia	Western Colombia (Antioquia)	
Anadia vittata	Boulenger's Anadia	Northwest Colombia (Chocó)	
Arthrosaura reticulata	Yellow-bellied Arthrosaura	Amazon basin	
Arthrosaura versteegii	-	Amazon basin	
Bachia bicolor	Two-colored Bachia	East Andes (Cundinamarca)	
Bachia flavescens	-	Amazon basin	
Bachia guianensis	Guyana Bachia	Orinoquia region	
Bachia heteropa	Laguaira Bachia	Caribbean lowlands	
Bachia pallidiceps	Cope's Bachia	Northwest Colombia	
Bachia panoplia	-	Amazon basin	
Bachia pyburni	-	Southeast Colombia (Río Negro drainage)	
Bachia talpa	Ruthven's Bachia	Santa Marta Mountains	Endemic
Bachia trisanale	Stacy's Bachia	Amazon basin	
Cercosaura ampuedai	-	East Andes on Venezuelan border	
Cercosaura argulus	Elegant Eyed Lizard	Amazon & Orinoquia regions, Magdalena & Cauca Valleys, below 1500 m	
Cercosaura manicata	Slender Prionodactylus	West Andes (Nariño, Cauca), above 1500 m	
Cercosaura ocellata	Ocellated Tegu	Amazon basin	
Cercosaura oshaughnessyi	White-striped Eyed Lizard	Amazon basin	
Cercosaura vertebralis	Brown Prionodactylus	Andes, 700–2500 m	
Echinosaura horrida	Rough Teiid	Pacific lowlands, Gorgona Island	
Echinosaura orcesi	-	Pacific lowlands (Southwest)	
Gymnophthalmus speciosus	Golden Spectacled Tegu	Caribbean lowlands, Inter-Andean valleys	
Iphisa elegans	Glossy Shade Lizard	Amazon basin	
Leposoma hexalepis	Six-scaled Tegu	Orinoquia region	Endemic
Leposoma ioanna	-	Pacific lowlands	Endemic
Leposoma parietale	-	Amazon basin	
Leposoma percarinatum	Muller's Tegu	Amazon basin	
Leposoma rugiceps	-	Caribbean & Pacific lowlands	
Leposoma southi	Northern Spectacled Lizard	Pacific lowlands	
Neusticurus medemi	Medem's Neusticurus	Amazon basin (Vaupés)	Endemic
Pholidobolus montium	Mountain Pholiodobolus	Andes (South), 2600–3300 m	
Potamites cochranae	Cochran's Neusticurus	Southern Colombia	
Potamites ecpleopus	Common Stream Lizard	Amazon basin	
Ptychoglossus bicolor	Werner's Largescale Lizard	Upper Magdalena River Valley	Endemic; Vulnerable
Ptychoglossus brevifrontalis	Boulenger's Largescale Lizard	Amazon basin (Vaupés)	
Ptychoglossus danieli	Daniel's Largescale Lizard	North Central Andes (Antioquia), 1500–2000 m	Endemic
Ptychoglossus eurylepis	-	West Andes (Southwest)	Endemic
Ptychoglossus festae	Peracca's Largescale Lizard	Northwest Colombia	
Ptychoglossus gorgonae	-	Pacific lowlands (Southwest), Gorgona Island	
Ptychoglossus grandisquamatus	Common Largescale Lizard	Northwest Colombia	Endemic
Ptychoglossus myersi	-	Northern Colombia	
Ptychoglossus nicefori	Loveridge's Largescale Lizard	East slope of East Andes, Orinoquia region	Endemic
Ptychoglossus plicatus	Taylor's Largescale Lizard	Northwest Colombia	
Ptychoglossus romaleos	-	Santa Marta Mountains	Endemic
Ptychoglossus stenolepis	-	West Andes (near Cali), 1750–1900 m	Endemic
Ptychoglossus vallensis	-	West Central Colombia (near Cali), 1000–1700 m	Endemic
Riama afrania	-	West Andes (Antioquia), 2350 m	
Riama columbiana	Colombian Lightbulb Lizard	West slope of Central Andes, 2100–2640 m	
Riama hyposticta	Boulenger's Lightbulb Lizard	Southwest Colombia (Nariño)	
Riama laevis	Shiny Lightbulb Lizard	West Andes (Valle del Cauca, Risaralda), 1960–3000 m	Endemic
Riama meleagris	Brown Lightbulb Lizard	Southwest Colombia, 1800–3150 m	
Riama simoterus	O'Shaughnessy's Lightbulb Lizard	Southwest Colombia, 2000–3300 m	
Riama stellae	-	Southwest Colombia (Nariño)	
Riama striata	Striped Lightbulb Lizard	East Andes, 2200–2530 m	Endemic
Tretioscincus agilis	Smooth Tegu	Amazon region	
Tretioscincus bifasciatus	Río Magdalena Tegu	Caribbean lowlands, Magdalena River Valley	

== Scincidae ==
Skinks
Scientific name	Common name	Distribution	Status
Alinea berengerae	San Andrés Skink	San Andrés Island	Endemic
Alinea pergravis	Providencia Skink	Providencia Island	
Marisora falconensis	-	Guajira peninsula	
Varzea bistriata	Two-striped Mabuya	Amazon basin	

== Teiidae ==
Whiptails
Scientific name	Common name	Distribution	Status
Ameiva ameiva	Giant Ameiva	Throughout except Pacific region & Guajira	
Ameiva bifrontata	Cope's Ameiva	Caribbean lowlands	
Ameiva praesignis	-	Caribbean lowlands, foothills of Northern Andes	
Cnemidophorus arenivagus	-	Guajira peninsula	
Cnemidophorus gramivagus	Wandering Grass Lizard	Orinoquia basin	
Cnemidophorus lemniscatus	Rainbow Whiptail	Throughout except Pacific region & high Andes	
Crocodilurus amazonicus	Crocodile Tegu	Amazon basin	
Dracaena guianensis	Northern Caiman Lizard	Amazon basin	
Holcosus anomalus	Echternacht's Ameiva	Pacific lowlands	Endemic
Holcosus bridgesii	Bridge's Ameiva	Pacific lowlands, Gorgona Island	
Holcosus festivus	Tiger Ameiva	Pacific lowlands (Northwest)	
Holcosus leptophrys	Delicate Ameiva	Pacific lowlands (Northwest)	
Holcosus niceforoi	Dunn's Ameiva	Magdalena River valley, to 1200 m	Endemic
Holcosus septemlineata	Seven-lined Ameiva	Pacific lowlands (Southwest)	
Kentropyx altamazonica	Cocha Whiptail	Amazon & Orinoquia regions	
Kentropyx pelviceps	Forest Whiptail	Amazon basin	
Kentropyx striata	Striped Whiptail	Amazon & Orinoquia regions	
Tupinambis teguixin	Colombian Tegu	Amazon basin	

=== Autarchoglossa Images ===
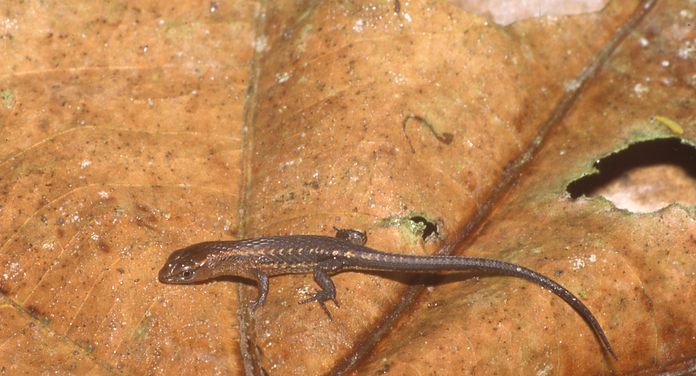
Northern Teiid (Alopoglossus angulatus)

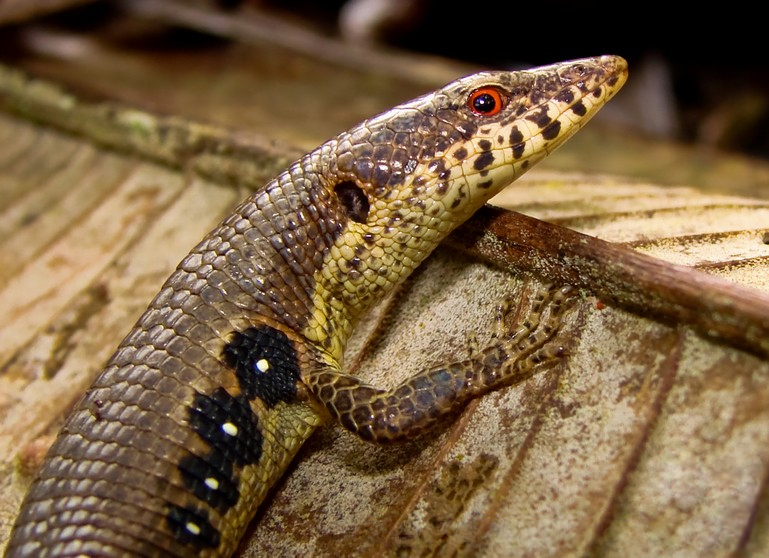
Rhombifer Anadia (Anadia rhombifera)

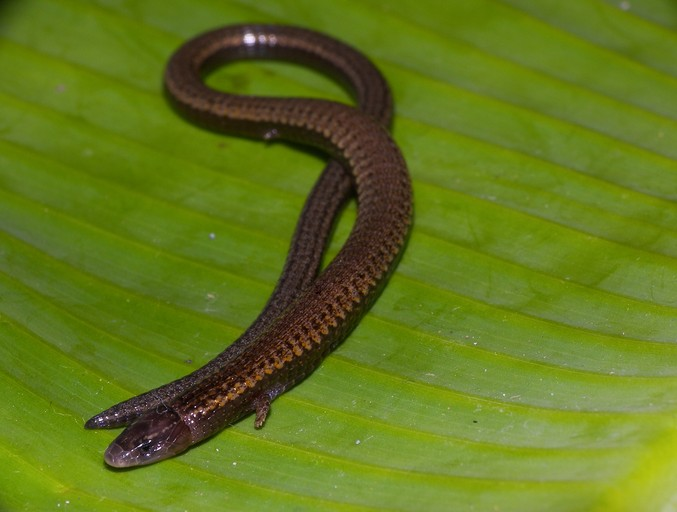
Two-colored Bachia (Bachia bicolor)

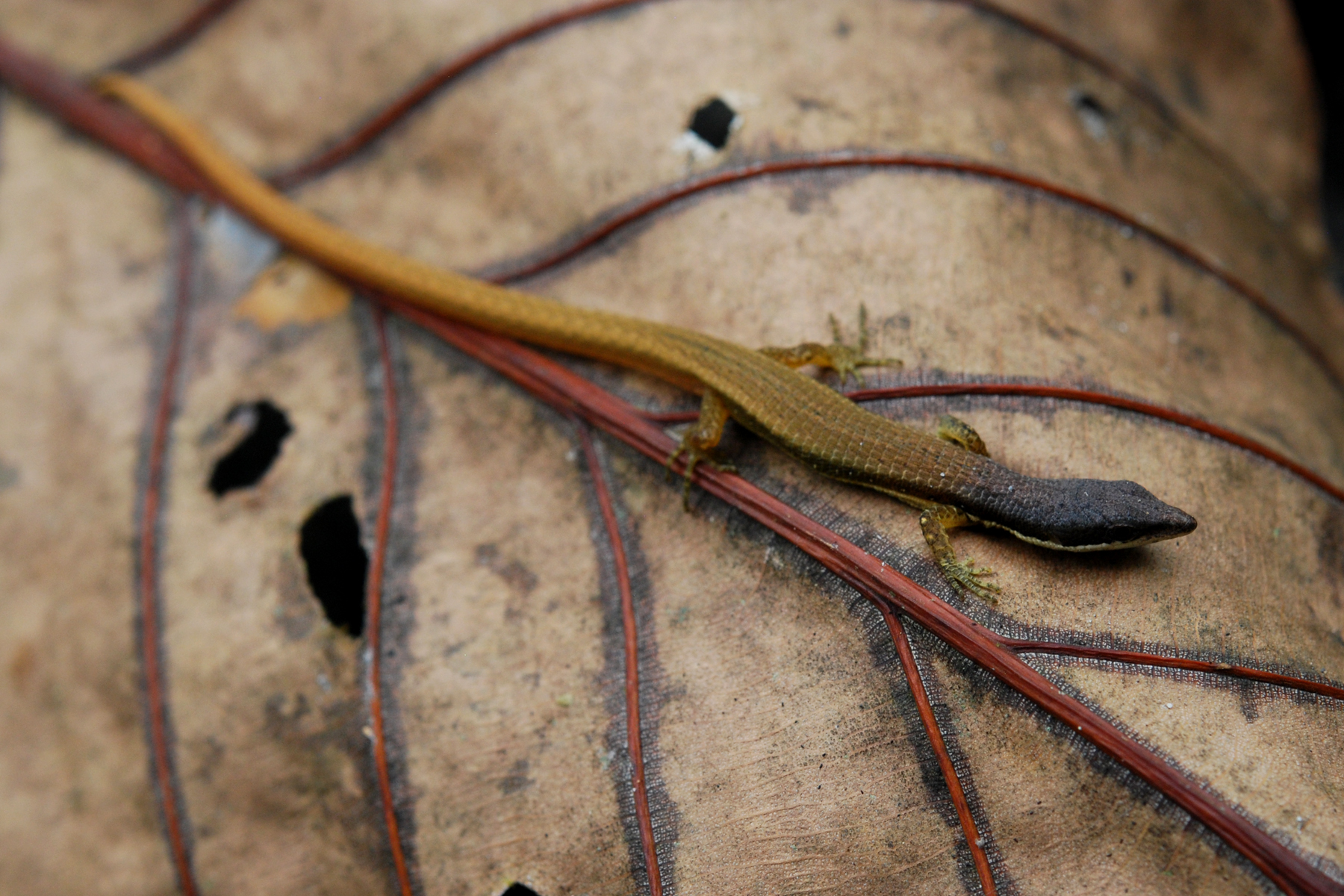
White-striped Eyed Lizard (Cercosaura oshaughnessyi)

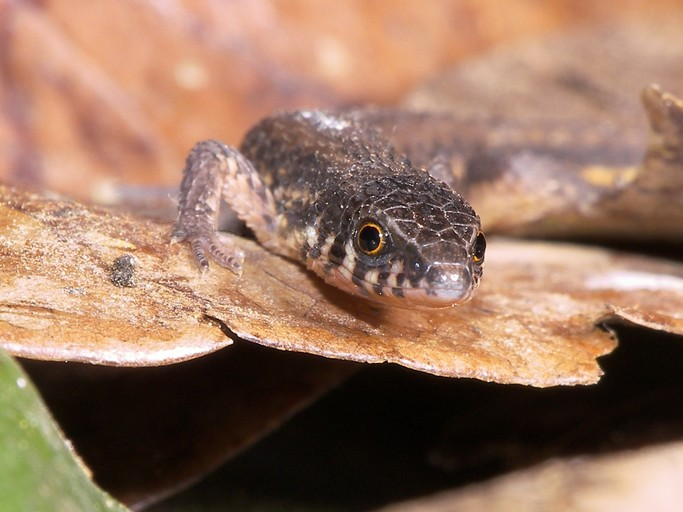
Leposoma rugiceps

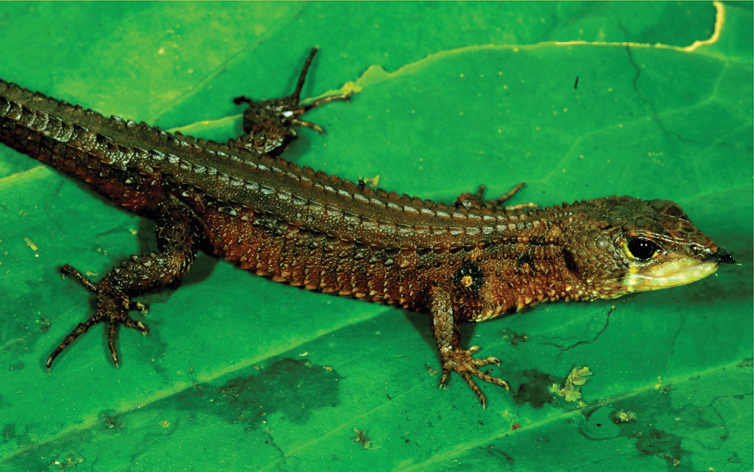
Common Stream Lizard (Potamites ecpleopus)

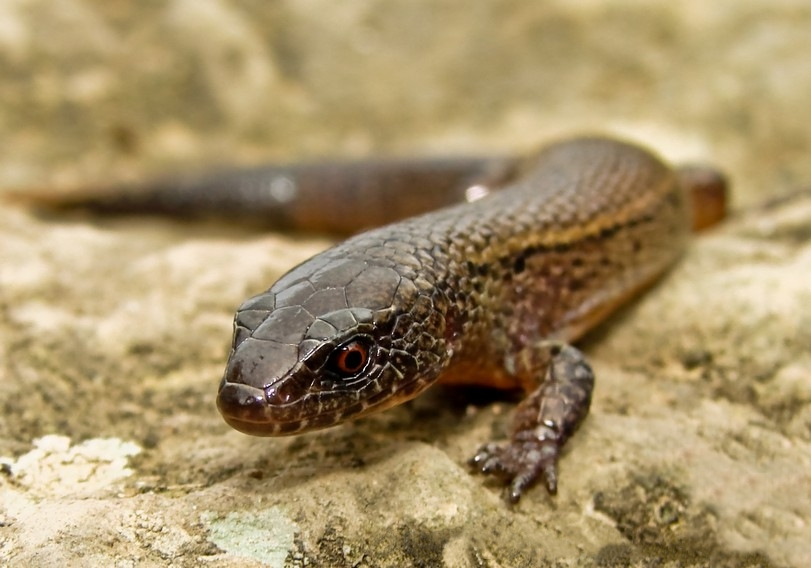
Striped Lightbulb Lizard (Riama striata)

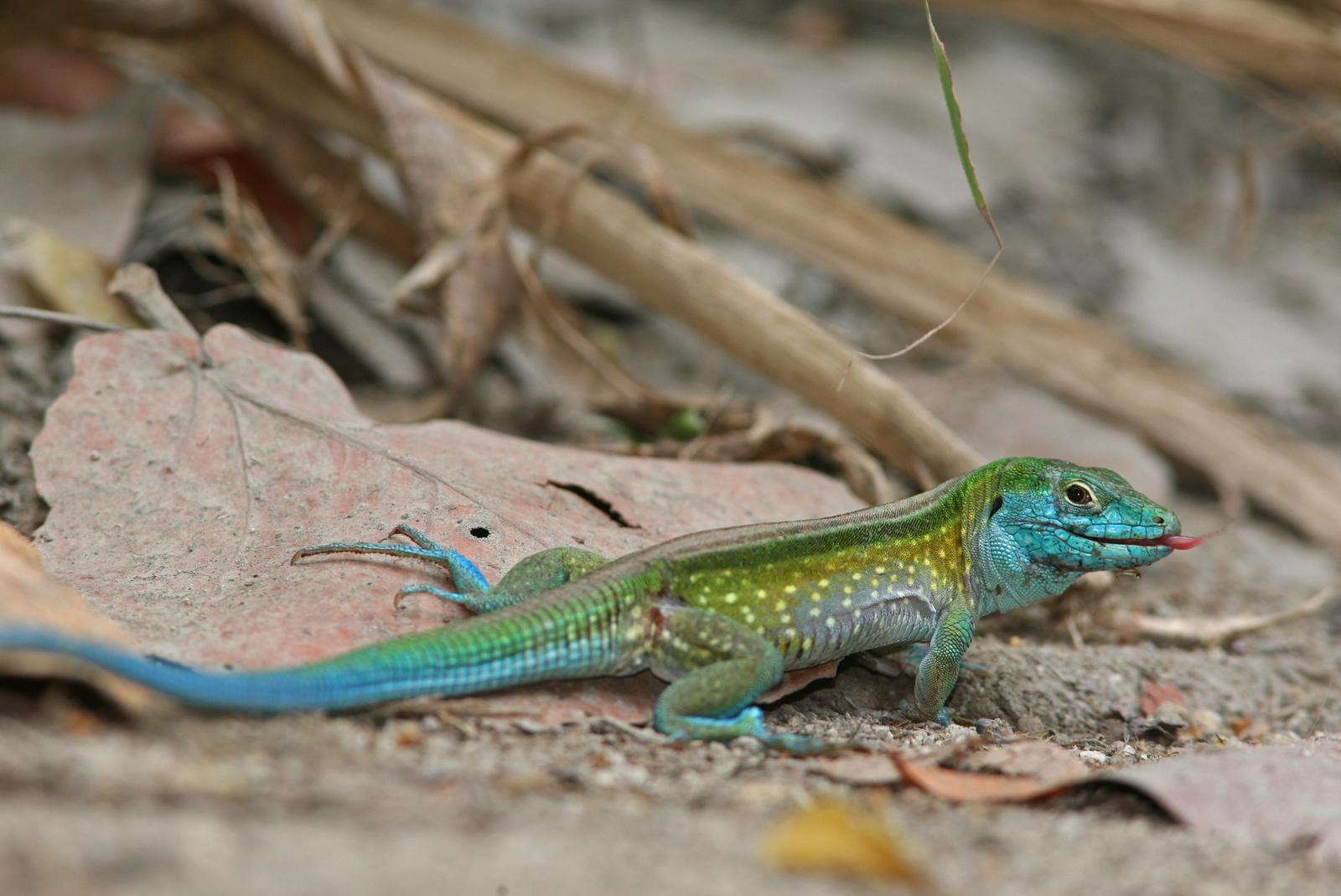
Giant Ameiva (Ameiva ameiva)

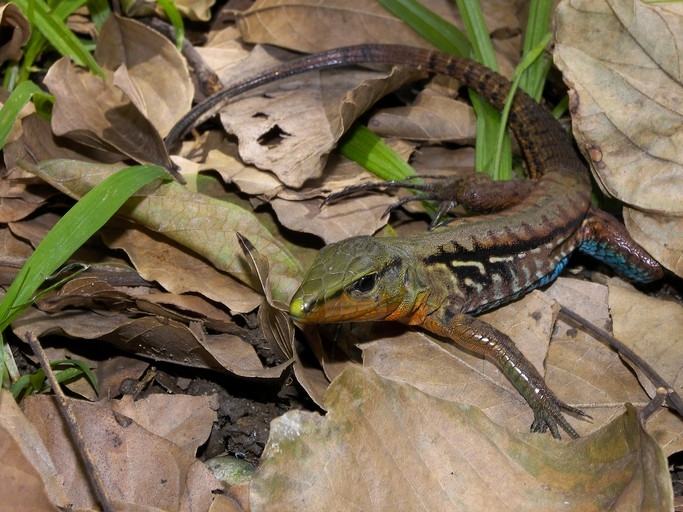
Tiger Ameiva (Holcosus festivus)

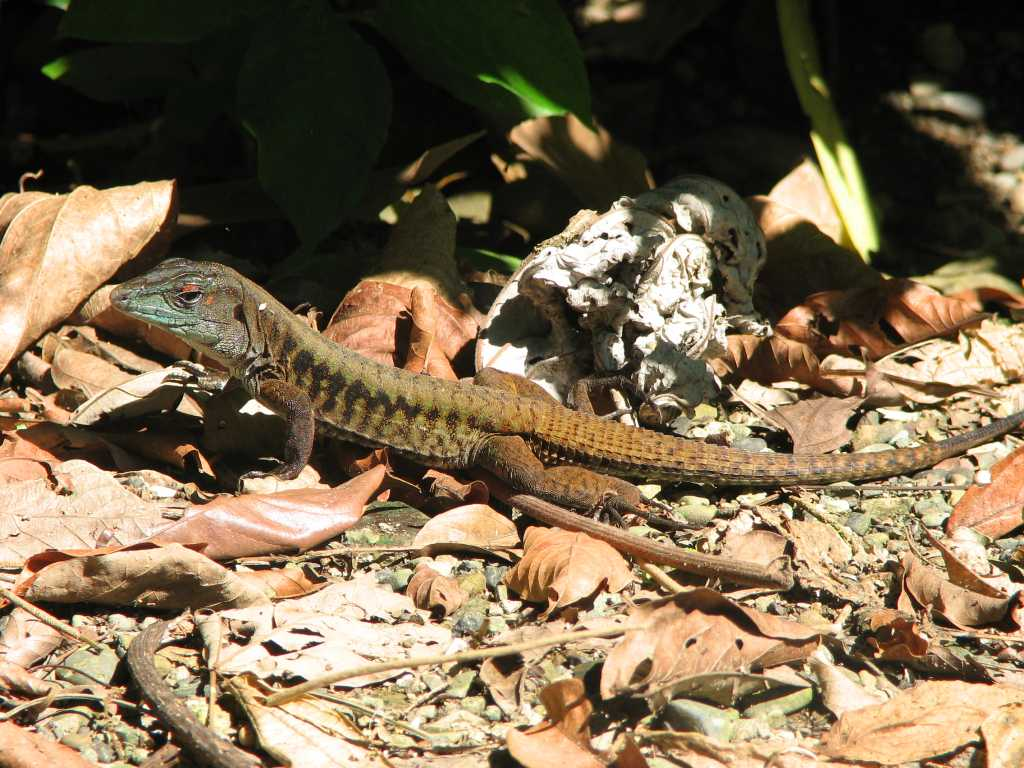
Delicate Ameiva (Holcosus leptophrys)

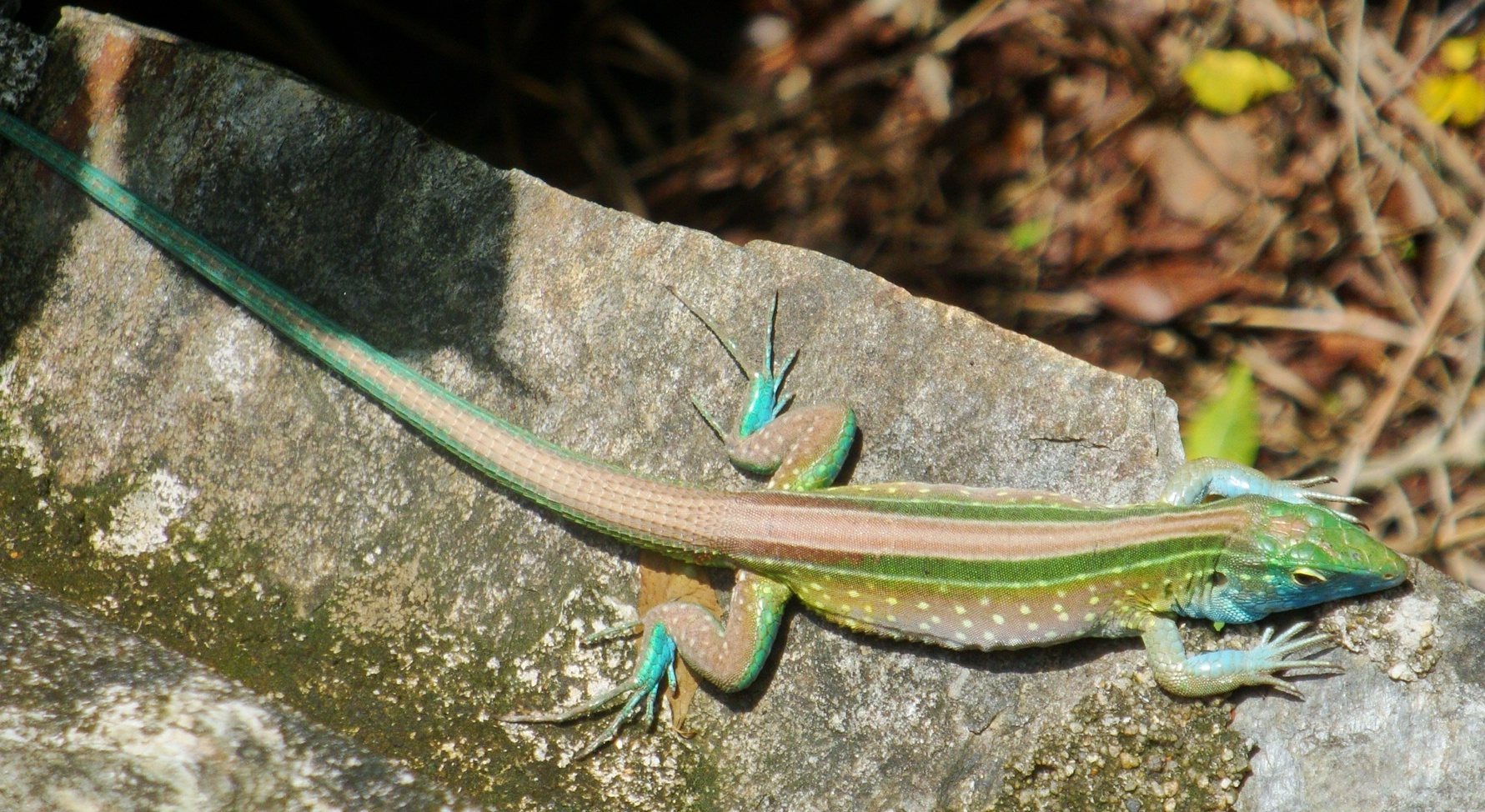
Rainbow Whiptail (Cnemidophorus lemniscatus)

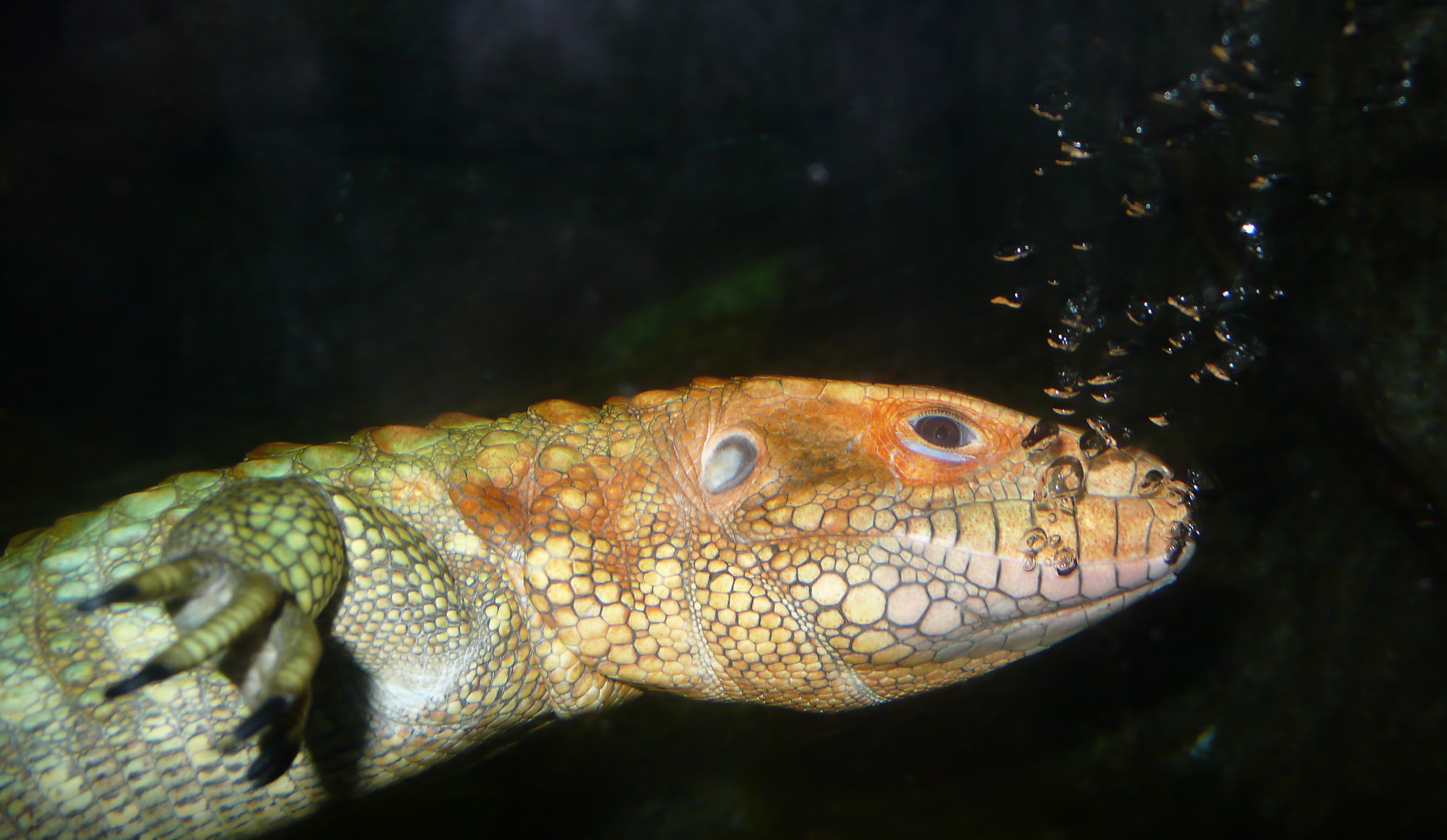
Northern Caiman Lizard (Dracaena guianensis)

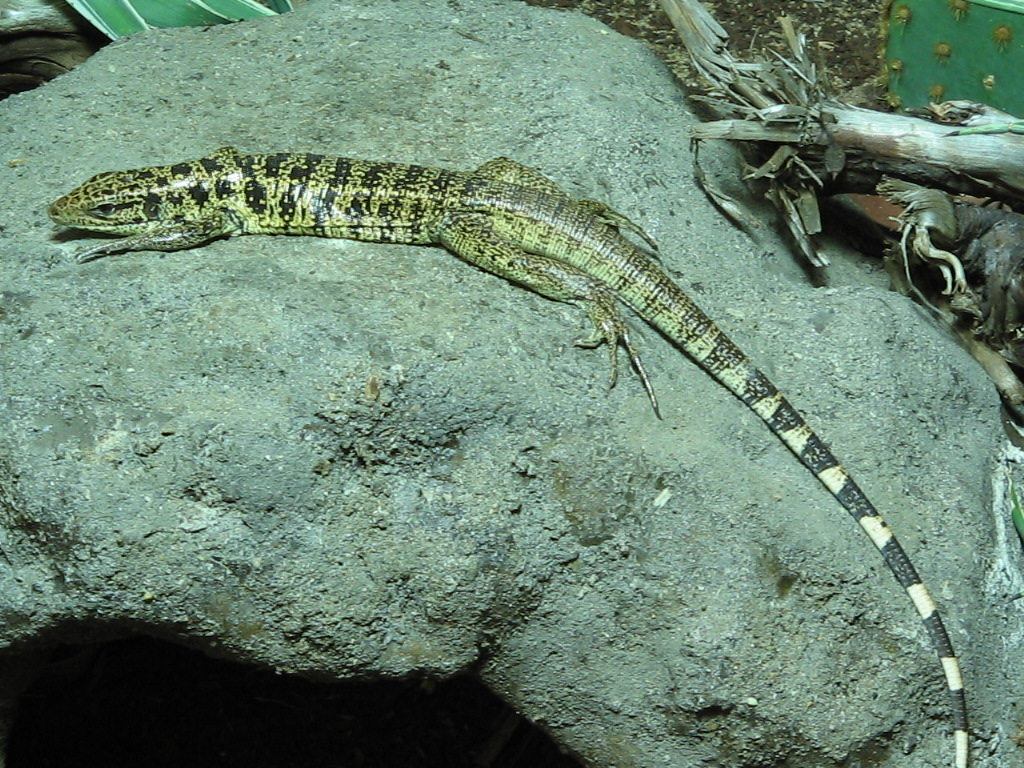
Colombian Tegu (Tupinambis teguixin)

== See also ==
- Fauna of Colombia
- Reptiles of Colombia
- Snakes of Colombia
