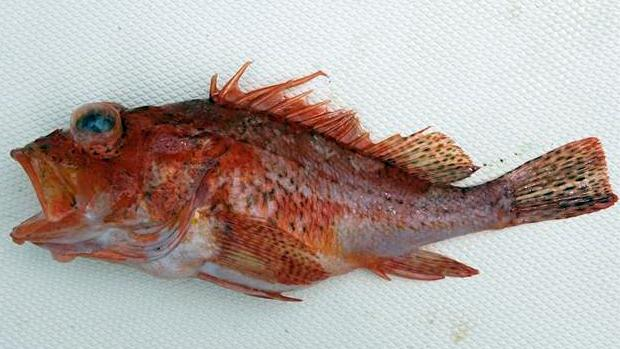

Conservation status
- Least Concern (IUCN 3.1)

Scientific classification
- Kingdom: Animalia
- Phylum: Chordata
- Class: Actinopterygii
- Order: Perciformes
- Family: Scorpaenidae
- Genus: Pontinus
- Species: P. furcirhinus

Binomial name
- Pontinus furcirhinus Garman, 1899

Synonyms
- Pontinus dubius Steindachner, 1902

= Pontinus furcirhinus =

Species of fish

Pontinus furcirhinus, one of a number of species known as the "red scorpionfish", is a species of marine ray-finned fish belonging to the family Scorpaenidae, the scorpionfishes. It is found in the eastern Pacific Ocean.

== Taxonomy ==
Pontinus furcirhinus was first formally described in 1899 by the American zoologist Samuel Garman, with the type locality given as northeast of the Galápagos Islands.

The specific name furcirhinus is a compound of furcatus, which means "forked", and rhinus meaning "snout", an allusion to the forked appearance of the upper jaw caused by the large patches of teeth.

== Description ==
Pontinus furcirhinus has a comparatively thin compressed body which has a depth of 31-38% of its standard length; the body widens with age. The nape is flat and there is no occipital pit to the rear of its large eyes. Some individuals have a slender, pointed cirrus over the eye. The mouth has teeth on its roof and on the sides, but none in the front. There are 12 spines in the dorsal fin, the third of which is highly elongated; it also has 8-9 soft rays, with the last ray being divided at its base and detached from the body. The anal fin has three spines and four soft rays. There is thick glandular tissue on the rear margin of the fin spines, which are thought to produce venom. The overall colour is reddish, of varying shades, mottled with white and dark brown and olive spots on their upper body. The caudal fin and the soft spined part of the dorsal fin are densely spotted with small dark oblong spots. The maximum recorded total length is 27 cm (11 in), although 15 cm (5.9 in) is more typical.

== Distribution and habitat ==
Pontinus furcirhinus is found in the eastern Pacific Ocean, from southern Baja California and the western and southern Gulf of California, south to Peru. It has been recorded from Cocos Island, Malpelo Island and the northern Galápagos Islands. This bathydemersal species is found at depths down to 300 m (980 ft) over sand and other soft substrates.

== Biology ==
Pontinus furcirhinus is a predator of mobile benthic crustaceans, cephalopods and bony fishes. It is frequently encountered in large schools.
