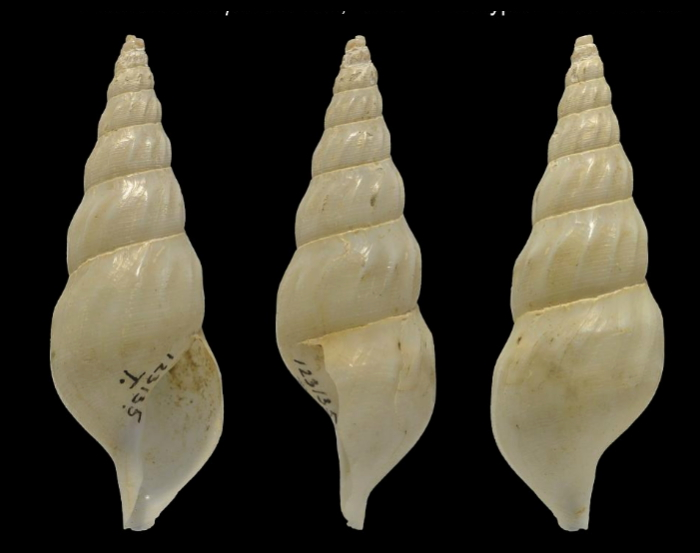
- Shell of Pleurotomella parella (holotype at the Smithsonian Institution)

Scientific classification
- Kingdom: Animalia
- Phylum: Mollusca
- Class: Gastropoda
- Subclass: Caenogastropoda
- Order: Neogastropoda
- Superfamily: Conoidea
- Family: Raphitomidae
- Genus: Pleurotomella
- Species: P. parella

Binomial name
- Pleurotomella parella Dall, 1908

Synonyms
- Pleurotomella (Pleurotomella) parella Dall, 1908

= Pleurotomella parella =

Species of sea snail

Pleurotomella parella is a species of sea snail, a marine gastropod mollusk in the family Raphitomidae.

== Description ==
The length of the shell attains 41 mm, its diameter 13.5 mm.

(Original description) The large, thin shell is elongate-fusiform. it is white with a very thin translucent periostracum. It contains about eight whorls exclusive of the (lost) protoconch. The spire rather is acute. The suture is slightly appressed. The whorl in front of it is polished and slightly constricted. The margin of the whorl here and there is obscurely plicate by the incremental lines. The surface of the fasciole here and there is marked by obscure, irregular, short, oblique, fine ridges at right angles to the lines of growth. In front of the fasciole are (on the penultimate whorl fourteen) low, feeble, protractively oblique ribs, with much wider shallow interspaces, hardly reaching the suture in front on the spire or the periphery on the body whorl. The spiral sculpture is confined to the whorl in front of the fasciole and consists of (on the penultimate whorl about fifteen) fine, sharp incised lines, on the body of the whorl rather distant, the interspaces flat and often unequal but toward the siphonal canal closer and more regular. The aperture is semilunar. The anal sulcus is near the suture, wide, shallow. The outer lip is very thin, sharp, simple. The body is polished. The columella is straight, gyrate, obliquely truncate in front. The axis is pervious. The siphonal canal is short, wide, in front slightly flaring.

== Distribution ==
This marine species occurs off Ecuador and off Malpelo Island, South of, Colombia, North Pacific Ocean at a depth of 2070 m.
