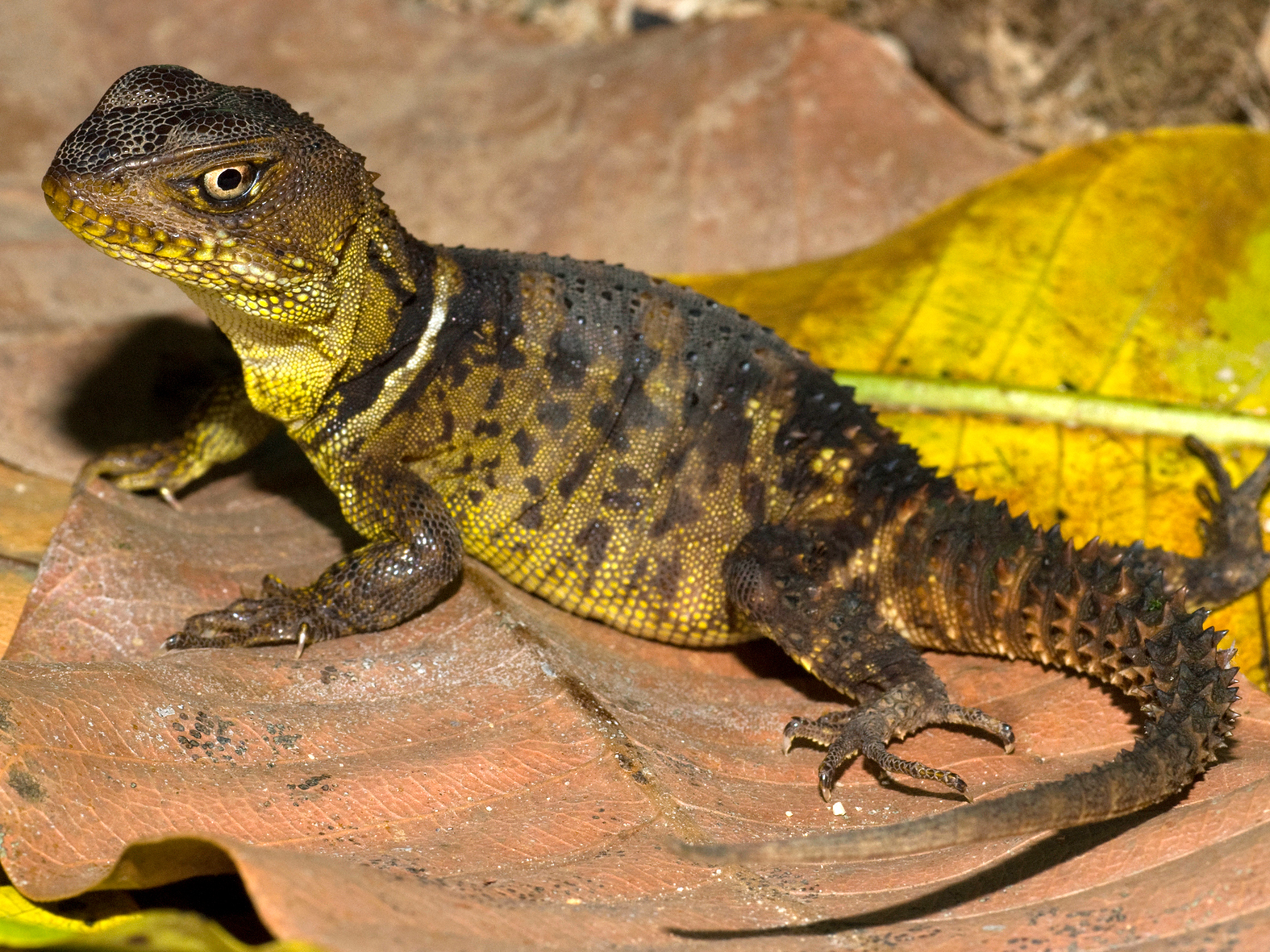
- Enyalioides groi in Anton Valley, Panama

Conservation status
- Endangered (IUCN 3.1)

Scientific classification
- Kingdom: Animalia
- Phylum: Chordata
- Class: Reptilia
- Order: Squamata
- Suborder: Iguania
- Family: Hoplocercidae
- Genus: Enyalioides
- Species: E. groi

Binomial name
- Enyalioides groi (Dunn, 1933)

Synonyms
- Morunasaurus groi Dunn, 1933; Enyalioides groi — Torres-Carvajal et al., 2023

= Dunn's spinytail lizard =

Species of lizard

Enyalioides groi, known commonly as Gro's manticore, Dunn's spinytail iguana, or Dunn's spinytail lizard, is a species of lizard in the family Hoplocercidae. The species is native to northwestern South America and Panama.

== Etymology ==
The specific name, groi, commemorates "Lord Gro", a character in the novel The Worm Ouroboros by E. R. Eddison. It was formerly assigned to its own genus, Morunasaurus, named for the Moruna, a region in the same novel.

== Geographic range ==
E. groi is found in central Panama and in northwestern Colombia.

== Habitat ==
The preferred natural habitat of E. groi is forest, at altitudes of 600–900 m (2,000–3,000 ft).

== Description ==
The tail of E. groi is covered with small spines. Males are reddish-brown with dark brown transverse bands across the back, reaching to the middle of the sides and then breaking up into small, irregular dark spots. Small white spots occur between the dark bands above the first longitudinal row of tubercles. The neck is red, with an incomplete white collar three to five scales wide, extending somewhat obliquely from just ahead of the forearm upward to the scapular region; the collar is edged on both sides by dark brown. The head is reddish and the chin and infralabial region scarlet red. The gular area is dark grayish-brown, the chest is pale chrome orange, and the belly is dirty white. Adult females are essentially the same color, lacking the scarlet red in the infralabial region, and the belly is yellow.

== Behavior ==
E. groi lives in burrows it excavates itself, especially under fallen logs.

== Reproduction ==
E. groi is oviparous.

== See also ==
- List of lizards of Colombia
