= Red scorpionfish =

Several species of fish share the name red scorpionfish:

- Pontinus furcirhinus
- Scorpaena scrofa
