= Colombian leaf-toed gecko =

Conservation status
- Least Concern (IUCN 3.1)

Scientific classification
- Kingdom: Animalia
- Phylum: Chordata
- Class: Reptilia
- Order: Squamata
- Suborder: Gekkota
- Family: Phyllodactylidae
- Genus: Phyllodactylus
- Species: P. transversalis

Binomial name
- Phyllodactylus transversalis Huey, 1975

Species of lizard

The Colombian leaf-toed gecko (Phyllodactylus transversalis) is a species of gecko endemic to Malpelo Island off Colombia.
