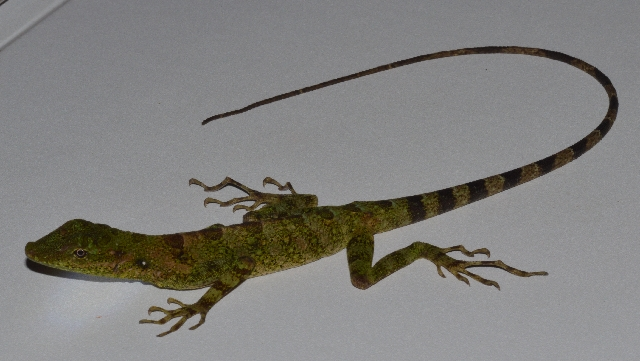

Conservation status
- Least Concern (IUCN 3.1)

Scientific classification
- Kingdom: Animalia
- Phylum: Chordata
- Class: Reptilia
- Order: Squamata
- Suborder: Iguania
- Family: Dactyloidae
- Genus: Anolis
- Species: A. anoriensis

Binomial name
- Anolis anoriensis Velasco, Gutiérrez-Cárdenas, & Quintero-Angel, 2010

= Anolis anoriensis =

Species of lizard

Anolis anoriensis is a species of lizard in the family Dactyloidae. The species is found in Colombia.
