= Anolis agassizi =

Conservation status
- Least Concern (IUCN 3.1)

Scientific classification
- Kingdom: Animalia
- Phylum: Chordata
- Class: Reptilia
- Order: Squamata
- Suborder: Iguania
- Family: Dactyloidae
- Genus: Anolis
- Species: A. agassizi

Binomial name
- Anolis agassizi Stejneger, 1900

Synonyms
- Anolis agassizi Stejneger, 1900; Dactyloa agassizi — Nicholson et al., 2005; Anolis agassizi — Zug, 2013

Species of lizard

Anolis agassizi, Agassiz's anole, is a species of lizard in the family Dactyloidae. The species is endemic to Malpelo Island, which is part of Colombia.

== Etymology ==
The specific name, agassizi, is in honour of Alexander Agassiz, who was an American zoologist and mining engineer.

== Habitat ==
The preferred natural habitat of A. agassizi is moist rocky areas, at altitudes from sea level to 376 m (1,234 ft).

== Description ==
Males of A. agassizi grow to 89–114 mm (3.5–4.5 in) snout-to-vent length (SVL), while females may reach 79–84 mm (3.1–3.3 in) SVL. The females and some of the males have spotted heads and grey-brown colouration. The remainder of the males have black nuptial crests, grow larger, and have larger testes. The reason for this is unknown, but may be related to the reduced predation on larger males.

== Ecology ==
Anolis agassizi is less territorial than other anoles, sharing perches and food sources without dispute. Their territories often overlap. Malpelo Island is quite barren of vegetation, and the anoles mainly eat insects, especially beetles. Based on an attraction to the colour orange, they may also eat bird eggs, as large numbers of boobies nest on the island. Their main predator is Diploglossus millepunctatus.

== Reproduction ==
A. agassizi is oviparous.
