= Malpelo Island =

Colombian island

Native name: Isla de Malpelo
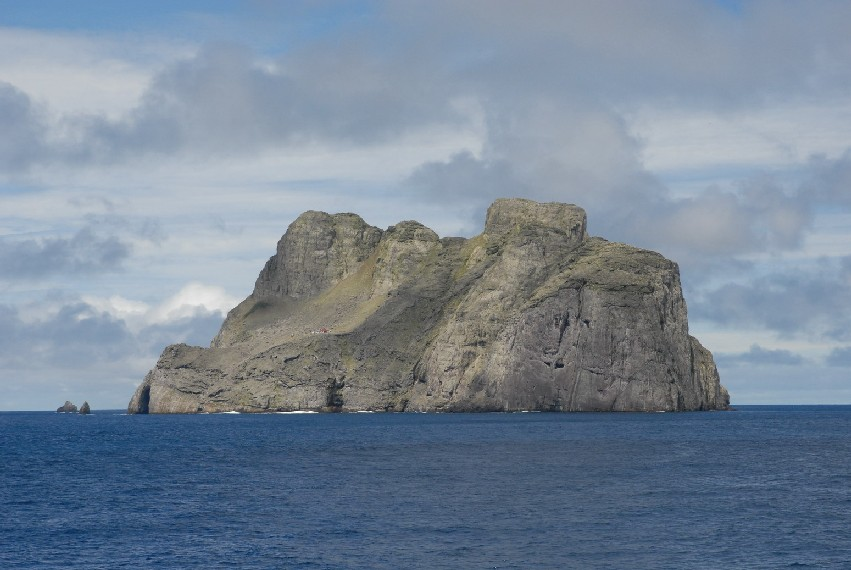
- Profile of Malpelo Island

- Location within Colombia Location within Pacific Ocean

Geography
- Location: Pacific Ocean
- Coordinates: 04°00′12.038″N 81°36′27.259″W
- Area: 1.2 km^{2} (0.46 sq mi)
- Length: 1.643 km (1.0209 mi)
- Width: 0.727 km (0.4517 mi)
- Highest elevation: 360 m (1180 ft)
- Highest point: Cerro La Mona

Administration
- Colombia
- Department: Valle del Cauca
- Municipality: Buenaventura

Demographics
- Population: Uninhabited

UNESCO World Heritage Site
- Official name: Malpelo Fauna and Flora Sanctuary
- Type: Natural
- Criteria: vii, ix
- Designated: 2006
- Reference no.: 1216
- Region: Latin America and the Caribbean

Map of Malpelo Island

Malpelo is an oceanic island in the eastern Pacific Ocean, about 500 km (310 mi) west of the Colombian mainland with a military post defended by the Colombian Armed Forces. It consists of a sheer and barren rock with three high peaks, the highest being the 300 m (980 ft) Cerro de la Mona. The island is about 1.5 kilometres (1 mile) in length from northeast to southwest, and 640 metres (700 yards) across at its widest.

== Geography ==
Malpelo is the only island that rises above the surface from the Malpelo Ridge, which is a solitary volcanic submarine ridge that extends in a northeast-southwest direction for 300 km (190 mi) and has a width of 100 km (62 mi). This island is surrounded by a number of offshore rocks. Off the northeast corner are the Tres Mosqueteros. Off the southwest corner are Salomón, Saúl, La Gringa, and Escuba. All the rocks are surrounded by deep water, and most of the face of the main island is very steep. Soundings between 1,800 and 9,100 metres (1,000 and 5,000 fathoms) are obtainable within a few kilometres of the shore and the currents are strong and changeable. As an oceanic island, it has never been connected with any other islands or the mainland.

Malpelo Island is composed of Miocene pillow lavas, volcanic breccias, and basaltic dikes that have been dated as being 16 to 17 million years old. This island and the underlying and underwater Malpelo Ridge were created along with the Carnegie Ridge in the Late Miocene by a very complex interaction between the Cocos-Nazca Spreading Centre and the Galápagos hotspot.

== History ==
=== Prehistory ===
Malpelo Island was presumably isolated from human contact prior to European discovery. It is uninhabited, and is located in the same area as other oceanic eastern Pacific islands, such as Cocos Island, Galápagos and the Revillagigedo Islands, which were all uninhabited at the time of European discovery, and possibly throughout their entire history prior to that.

=== Discovery and early history ===
The exact date of Malpelo's discovery is unclear, although it may have been the first of the remote eastern Pacific islands to have been discovered by Europeans, as it appears on Peruvian maps from as early as 1530. Malpelo became a possession of Spain following its discovery, and was eventually inherited by Spain's colony Peru. In 1542, the island was visited by Peruvian governor Cristóbal Vaca de Castro. Colombia later acquired the island, apparently without any opposition from Peru. The island was profiled in the 1920 book Discoveries and Acquisitions in the Pacific, which states, "Being uninhabited, Malpelo has no political history. It is, however, not devoid of interest, for there is good reason to believe that of all the Pacific Islands situated near, but out of sight of, the American continent this was the first one ever discovered by seamen sailing from its ports." The book also noted the difficulty in landing on the island, describing it as "all but impracticable". The island was later profiled in the 1951 book Geography of the Pacific, which featured profiles on Australia and most other insular areas bordering the Pacific. Malpelo is categorized in the book as one of the islands of the eastern Pacific, alongside Clipperton Island, Cocos Island, the Desventuradas Islands, the Galápagos Islands, Guadalupe Island, the Juan Fernández Islands, the Revillagigedo Islands and Salas y Gómez Island.

=== Modern history ===
Nearly all tourism activity is related to scuba diving with the marine life, rather than terrestrial land activity on the island itself. Due to the issues with naturally landing on the island, visitors have to use ladders or helicopters to reach its surface. The Colombian National Navy are now regularly stationed on the island, and a small white shack has been constructed on the surface. The shack sits alongside two satellite dishes, and a miniature power pole.

Because of its remoteness, Malpelo counts as an DXCC "entity" for amateur radio purposes. Several DXpeditions to the island have been made with the permission of the Colombian government.

In 2011, Colombian environmental authorities reported a mass slaughter of up to 2,000 hammerhead sharks, Galápagos sharks, and silky sharks within the Malpelo Fauna and Flora Sanctuary. This was initially discovered and reported by a team of research divers studying the local marine life, with the official findings confirmed by Sandra Bessudo, the top environmental adviser to the Colombian president. The massacre happened after ten Costa Rican-flagged illegal fishing trawlers invaded the sanctuary to harvest shark fins for the lucrative Asian delicacy trade, where shark fin soup could fetch up to £63 a bowl. The illegal vessels targeted Malpelo due to its dense shark populations, extreme remoteness (36 hours from the nearest port), and a temporary absence of Colombian naval patrols in the area at the time.

In September 2016, a group of five scuba divers went missing on a trip to the island. Four of the divers were Colombian, while another, Peter Morse, was Australian. After surfacing back from the initial dive, the five were carried away from their support boat by the strong current. They could see the boat initially, but the distance quickly increased. The boat crew could not locate them once they drifted, and the divers soon became separated from each other. Morse decided to swim toward the boat and then toward Malpelo Island, fighting the current for hours while still wearing his diving gear. He spent 16 hours alone in the water before being spotted and rescued by liveaboard vessel M/V Yemaya II. Two other divers, Jorge Morales and Darío Rodríguez, stayed together and survived 48 hours drifting in the open Pacific ocean. They tied themselves together so they would not separate, used body heat to stay warm, and endured encounters with sharks and painful jellyfish stings before being rescued by the Colombian National Navy. The body of diver Erika Vanessa Diaz was found a week later, 140 miles southeast of Malpelo. The body of dive leader Carlos Jimenez was never retrieved.

In September 2024, three Ecuadorian nationals were apprehended for illegal fishing activities within the Malpelo Fauna and Flora Sanctuary, a protected marine area. The individuals were intercepted by the Colombian National Navy while transporting approximately 40 illegally caught fish, including sailfish, marlin, dorado, albacore, tollo sharks, and hammerhead sharks. Following their arrest, the suspects were charged with offenses including environmental damage, ecocide, and violation of national fishing regulations. During preliminary hearings, they entered no-contest pleas. A judge subsequently ordered their detention pending further legal proceedings. In another incident from July 2026, the Colombian National Navy seized 800 kilograms of fish from Ecuadorian citizens which were illegally caught from the Malpelo Fauna and Flora Sanctuary.

In October 2025, a documentary about the island was released, titled The Island of the Shark — Guardians of Malpelo. The documentary celebrated 30 years of protection for the Malpelo Flora and Fauna Sanctuary, and showed the work being done to fight against illegal fishing in the sanctuary.

== Natural history ==
At first glance, the island seems to be barren rock, devoid of all vegetation, but deposits of bird guano have helped colonies of algae, lichens, mosses, and some shrubs and ferns to establish themselves, all of which glean nutrients from the guano. Lizards are the only non-avian vertebrates on the island, with three species in total.

- Agassiz's anole (Anolis agassizi)
- Dotted galliwasp (Diploglossus millepunctatus)
- Colombian leaf-toed gecko (Phyllodactylus transversalis)

It is also home to a unique species of land crab, Johngarthia malpilensis, first described in 1893.

The island has been recognised as an Important Bird Area (IBA) by BirdLife International because it supports a breeding population of some 60,000–110,000 Nazca boobies, as estimated in 2007.

Malpelo is home of a unique shark population; swarms of 500 hammerhead sharks and hundreds of silky sharks are frequently seen by diving expeditions, making it a very popular shark-diving location. It is one of the few places where the smalltooth sand tiger has been seen alive; it is frequently spotted at the dive site "El bajo del Monstruo". Acanthemblemaria stephensi, the Malpelo barnacle blenny, is a species of chaenopsid blenny found in coral reefs around Malpelo. The largest no-fishing zone in the East Pacific, measuring over 850,000 hectares, surrounds the island.

The Malpelo Nature Reserve, a plant and wildlife sanctuary, covering 857,500 ha (3,311 mi^{2}) centered at 04°0′12.038″N 81°36′27.259″W. A Colombian foundation is trying to preserve the biodiversity of the site. On July 12, 2006, Malpelo was declared by UNESCO as a natural World Heritage Site because of its status as an important shark reserve.

== Chronology ==
- 1530 – Malpelo is said to have been recorded in a map of this date.
- 1542 – Cristóbal Vaca de Castro visited.
- 1550 – Malpelo was recorded in Pierre Desceliers' map.
- 1704 – Wreck of the English vessel Cinque Ports
- 1790 – Spanish landing on Malpelo was mentioned to Alessandro Malaspina.
- 1793 – James Colnett visited.
- 1837 – A note in The Nautical Magazine recorded a visit.
- 1995 – Malpelo was designated as a flora and fauna sanctuary.

== Gallery ==
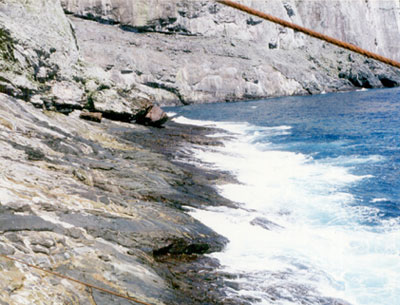
Shore and cliffs

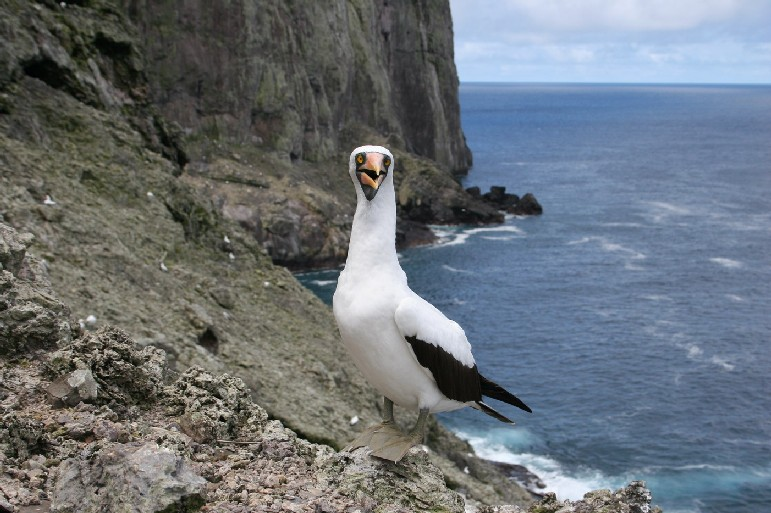
Nazca booby Sula granti

== See also ==
● Malpelo plate

● Gorgona Island (Colombia)
