= Paradracaena =

Paradracaena Temporal range: Miocene ~13–7 Ma

Scientific classification
- Kingdom: Animalia
- Phylum: Chordata
- Class: Reptilia
- Order: Squamata
- Family: Teiidae
- Genus: †Paradracaena
- Species: †P. colombiana

Binomial name
- †Paradracaena colombiana (Estes 1961)

Synonyms
- Tupinambis huilensis Estes 1961; Dracaena colombiana Sullivan & Estes 1997

Extinct genus of lizards

Paradracaena is an extinct genus of lizards from northern South America. Fossils of Paradracaena colombiana have been found in the Honda Group of Colombia, Peru and Brazil. The species was described as a member of the tegus; Tupinambis huilensis by Estes in 1961.

== Description ==
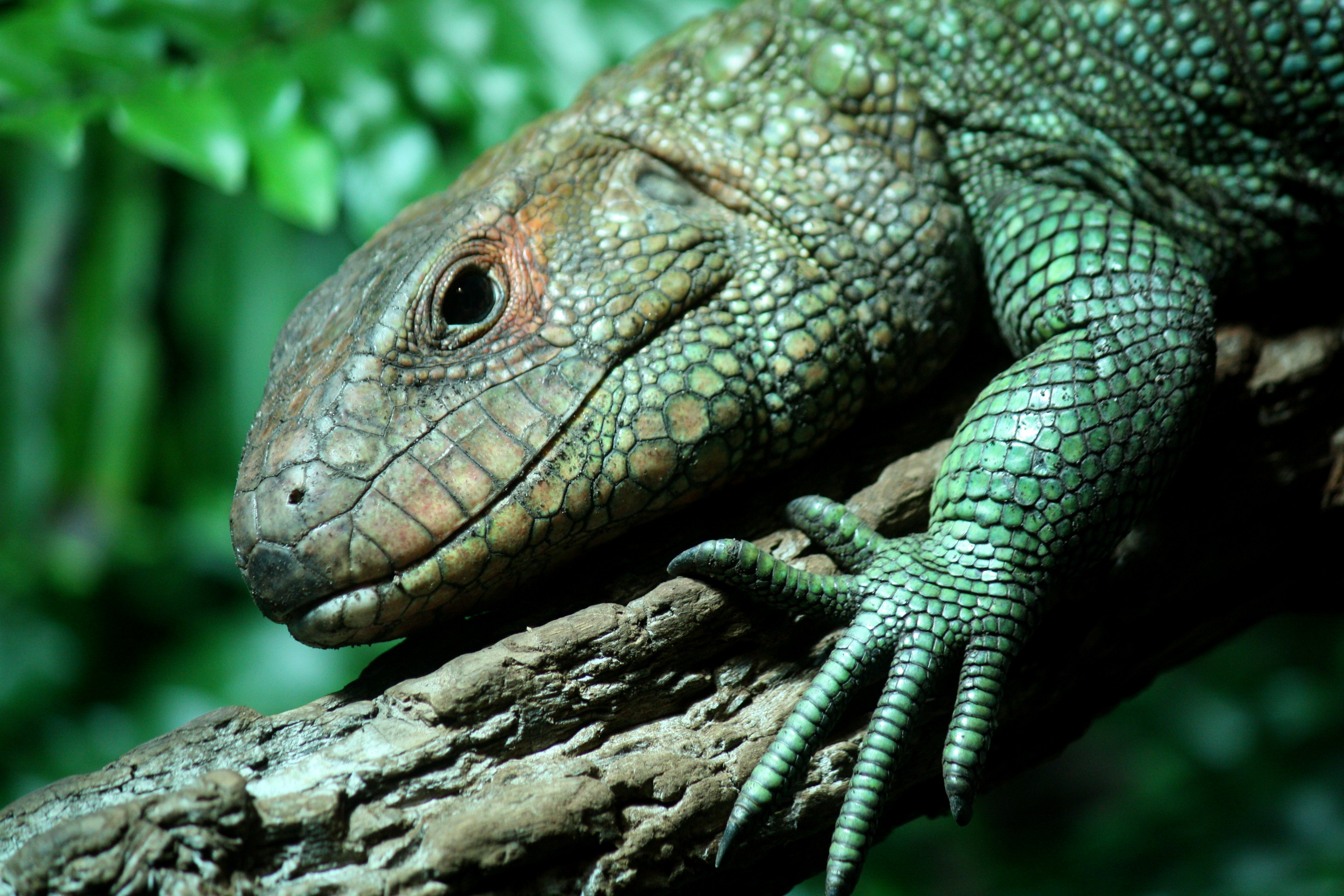
A modern relative, the northern caiman lizard (Dracaena guianensis)

Paradracaena colombiana was first described as Tupinambis huilensis by Estes in 1961, later named Dracaena colombiana by Sullivan and Estes in 1997. These ground dwelling insectivore-carnivores were described from fossils found in fluvial and lacustrine clays of the Middle Miocene (Laventan in the SALMA classification) Villavieja Formation in Colombia. They share a number of features with extant caiman lizards, such as large teeth and a robust quadrate, but also bear more primitive characteristics, such as a higher tooth count.

== Distribution ==
Apart from the type locality in the Honda Group, fossils attributed to the genus Paradracaena were recovered from the Pebas and Solimões Formations of the Amazon Basin of respectively Peru and Brazil.

== See also ==
- List of fossiliferous stratigraphic units in Colombia
