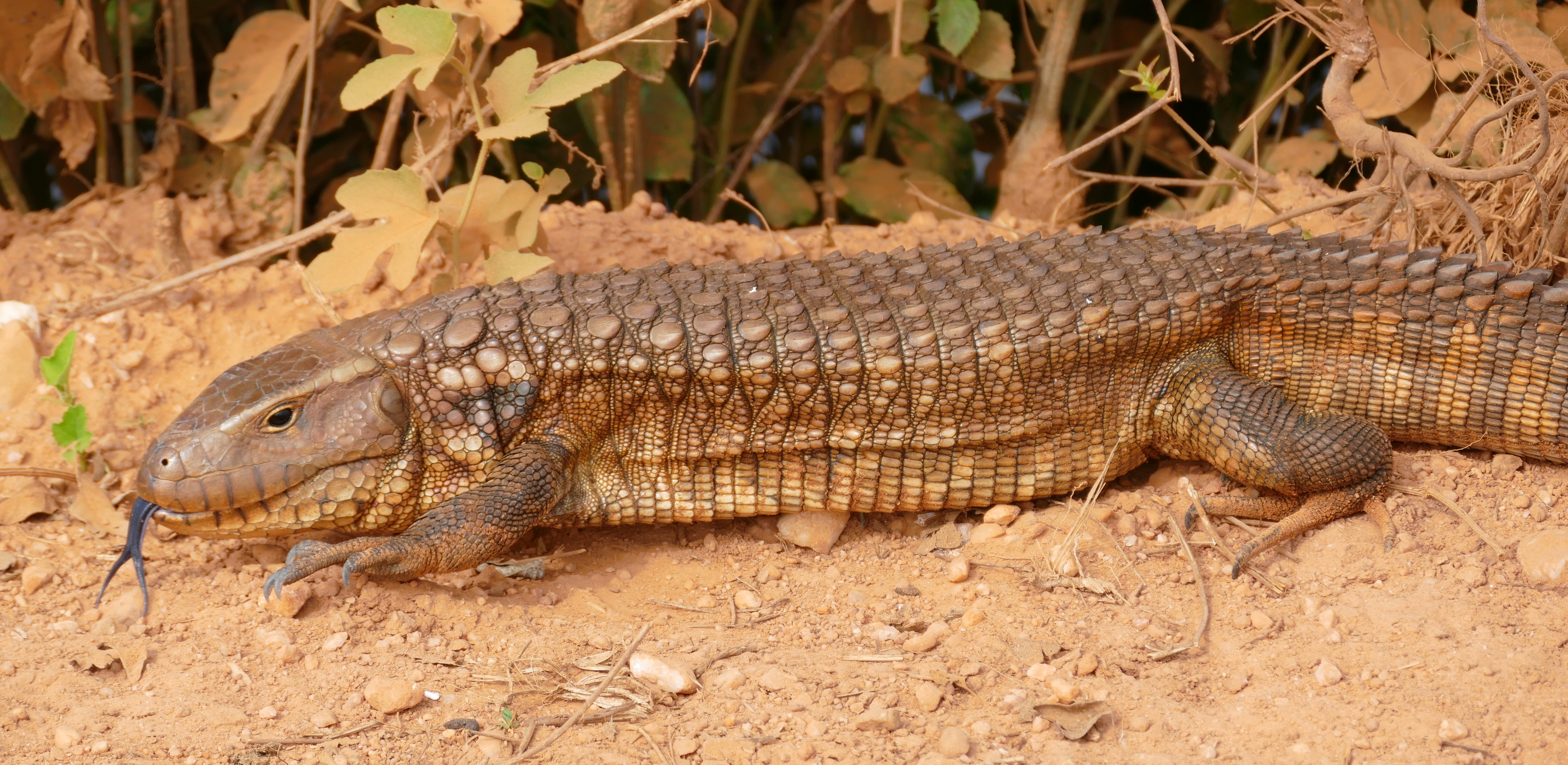

Conservation status
- Least Concern (IUCN 3.1)
- CITES Appendix II

Scientific classification
- Kingdom: Animalia
- Phylum: Chordata
- Class: Reptilia
- Order: Squamata
- Family: Teiidae
- Genus: Dracaena
- Species: D. paraguayensis

Binomial name
- Dracaena paraguayensis Amaral, 1950

= Dracaena paraguayensis =

Species of lizard

Dracaena paraguayensis, the Paraguay caiman lizard, is a species of lizard in the family Teiidae. It is found in Northern Paraguay, Brazil and Bolivia.

== Description ==
Paraguay caiman lizards are closely related to the more well known northern caiman lizard, from which it differs especially in coloration, having light brown scales with dark banding rather than its relatives distinctive bright green and red. These lizards are known as 'caiman lizards' because of their noticeable resemblance to crocodilians, having rows of raised spikes in a croc-like arrangement.

They generally prefer dry climates and can often be found along the banks for rivers. Like all water tegus, they are semi-aquatic.
