= Crocodile lizard =

Crocodile lizard may refer to:

- Chinese crocodile lizard (Shinisaurus crocodilurus), a semiaquatic lizard of China and Vietnam
- Crocodilurus, a monotypic lizard genus native to South America
