= Tegus =

Tegus is:

- Tegus, an abbreviation and nickname for the city of Tegucigalpa
- plural of tegu, a common name for the lizard of the same name
