= Tupinambis palustris =

Conservation status
- CITES Appendix II (CITES)

Scientific classification
- Domain: Eukaryota
- Kingdom: Animalia
- Phylum: Chordata
- Class: Reptilia
- Order: Squamata
- Family: Teiidae
- Genus: Tupinambis
- Species: T. palustris

Binomial name
- Tupinambis palustris Manzani & Abe, 2002

Species of lizard

Tupinambis palustris, the swamp tegu, is a species of lizard in the family Teiidae. It is endemic to Brazil.
