= Tupinambis zuliensis =

Conservation status
- CITES Appendix II

Scientific classification
- Kingdom: Animalia
- Phylum: Chordata
- Class: Reptilia
- Order: Squamata
- Family: Teiidae
- Genus: Tupinambis
- Species: T. zuliensis

Binomial name
- Tupinambis zuliensis Murphy, Jowers, Lehtinen, Charles, Colli, Peres Jr., Hendry, & Pyron, 2016

Species of lizard

Tupinambis zuliensis, the Maracaibo Basin tegu lizard, is a species of lizard in the family Teiidae. It is endemic to Venezuela.
