= Tegu =

Common name of a number of species of lizards

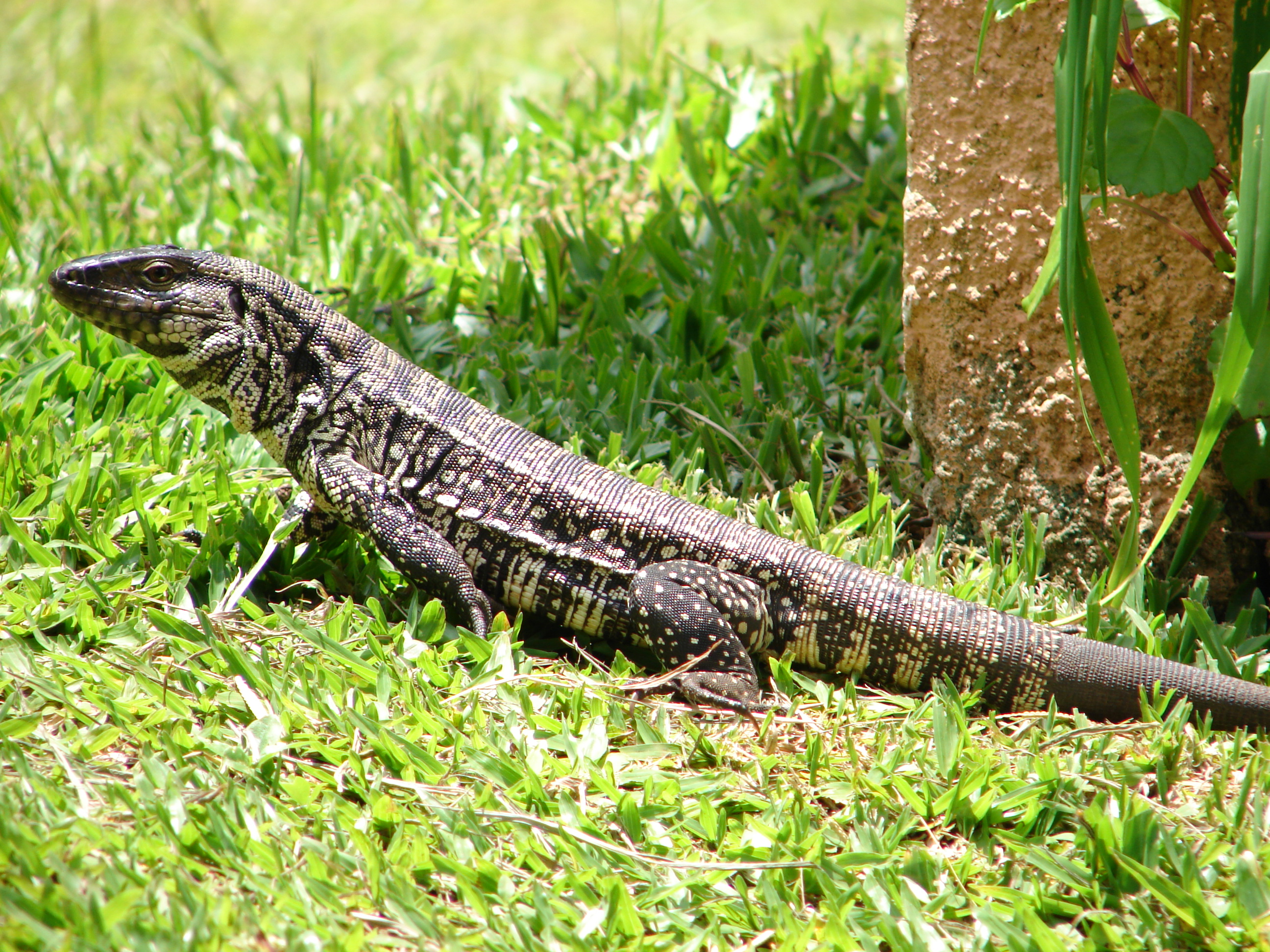
An Argentine black and white tegu (Salvator merianae)

Tegu is a common name of a number of species of lizards that belong to the families Teiidae and Gymnophthalmidae. Tegus are native to Central and South America. They occupy a variety of habitats and are known for their large size and predatory habits.

== Description ==
Tegus are usually black mixed with other colors and patterns; some have yellow, reddish or white bands along their backs, others have lines going down their bodies with unique markings on their sides. Their body shape presents a streamlined appearance with long tails and strong legs. Most tegus grow to be about a metre long, but the black and white tegu (S. merianae) can grow to about 1.3 metres (4 ft 3 in).

Although tegus resemble the Varanidae (monitors) in appearance, they are not closely related to them. Their similarities are an example of convergent evolution, when unrelated or distantly related species develop physical or behavioral similarities based on ecological niche, adaptations or environment.

Tegus use their tongues and vomeronasal organ to find chemical cues associated with their prey and other lizards. A vomeronasal organ is an organ of chemoreception located in the nasal chamber.

== Habitat ==
Tegus naturally occur in rainforests, deciduous semiarid thorn forests, savannas, fields and grasslands. They have also adapted to open areas created by agriculture, parks and construction zones. They spend much of their time in burrows.

== Diet ==
As omnivores, tegus feed on various foods including fruits, insects, frogs, small rodents, birds, eggs and carrion. Tegus living near humans may raid chicken coops for eggs and baby chicks, or scavenge leftover food such as crackers, cheese and chips.

== Behavior ==
When confronted, a wild tegu initially stops moving with its head held up high, then attempts to flee. It may turn aggressive if cornered, biting and attacking with its tail. In contrast, captive-raised tegus can be docile, intelligent and social with their carers.

Tegus are popular in the international pet trade as owners often compare them to dogs due to their loving, casual nature.

In the coolest areas of their range, such as northern Argentina, tegus hibernate from June to September.

== Endothermy ==
During the reproductive season, Argentine black and white tegus can raise their body temperature by up to 10 °C above the ambient temperature (seasonal reproductive endothermy). This is conjectured to be advantageous for them when coming out of hibernation, regrowing gonads, producing gametes (gametogenesis), mating, and (for females) producing eggs and incubating them.

== Importance ==
Tegus are traditionally hunted for their meat, fat, and hides.

Argentine black and white tegus are widely and successfully bred and kept as pets, with red tegus being slightly less common in the hobby but still present. Additionally, Dracaena guianensis, the northern caiman lizard, is growing in popularity among breeders and hobbyists.

Some species have become invasive in the U.S. state of Florida and southern parts of Georgia.

== Invasive populations in the United States ==
The Argentine black and white tegus (Salvator merianae) have established breeding colonies in multiple areas of Florida beyond their native territory including southern Miami-Dade and southwest Charlotte and west-central Hillsborough and eastern St. Lucie counties and southern Georgia. Tegus are generalist omnivores and efficient egg predators that threaten ground-nesting birds and reptiles (including gopher tortoises and alligators) and may affect Everglades restoration efforts. In Florida, tegus are listed as a Prohibited Species and cannot be possessed without a permit. Experimental work by the U.S. Geological Survey indicates the species can survive winters under semi-natural conditions well beyond its current invasive range, suggesting potential for further spread if released. The species distribution models show that suitable climate conditions exist outside the Florida peninsula during current and projected time periods.

== Genera ==
"Tegu" generally refers to species of lizard in the genus Tupinambis, which belongs to the family Teiidae. Not all lizards known as tegus belong to the same genus. The word "tegu" may refer to species in any of the following genera:

- Callopistes: "dwarf tegus" (2 species)
- Crocodilurus: the "crocodile tegu" (1 species)
- Dicrodon: "desert tegus" (3 species)
- Dracaena: "caiman tegus", also known as "caiman lizards" (2 species)
- Euspondylus: "sun tegus" (11 species)
- Proctoporus: "sun tegus" (17 species)
- Salvator (includes the Argentine black and white tegu) (3 species)
- Teius (includes "four-toed tegu") (3 species)
- Tupinambis (8 species)
