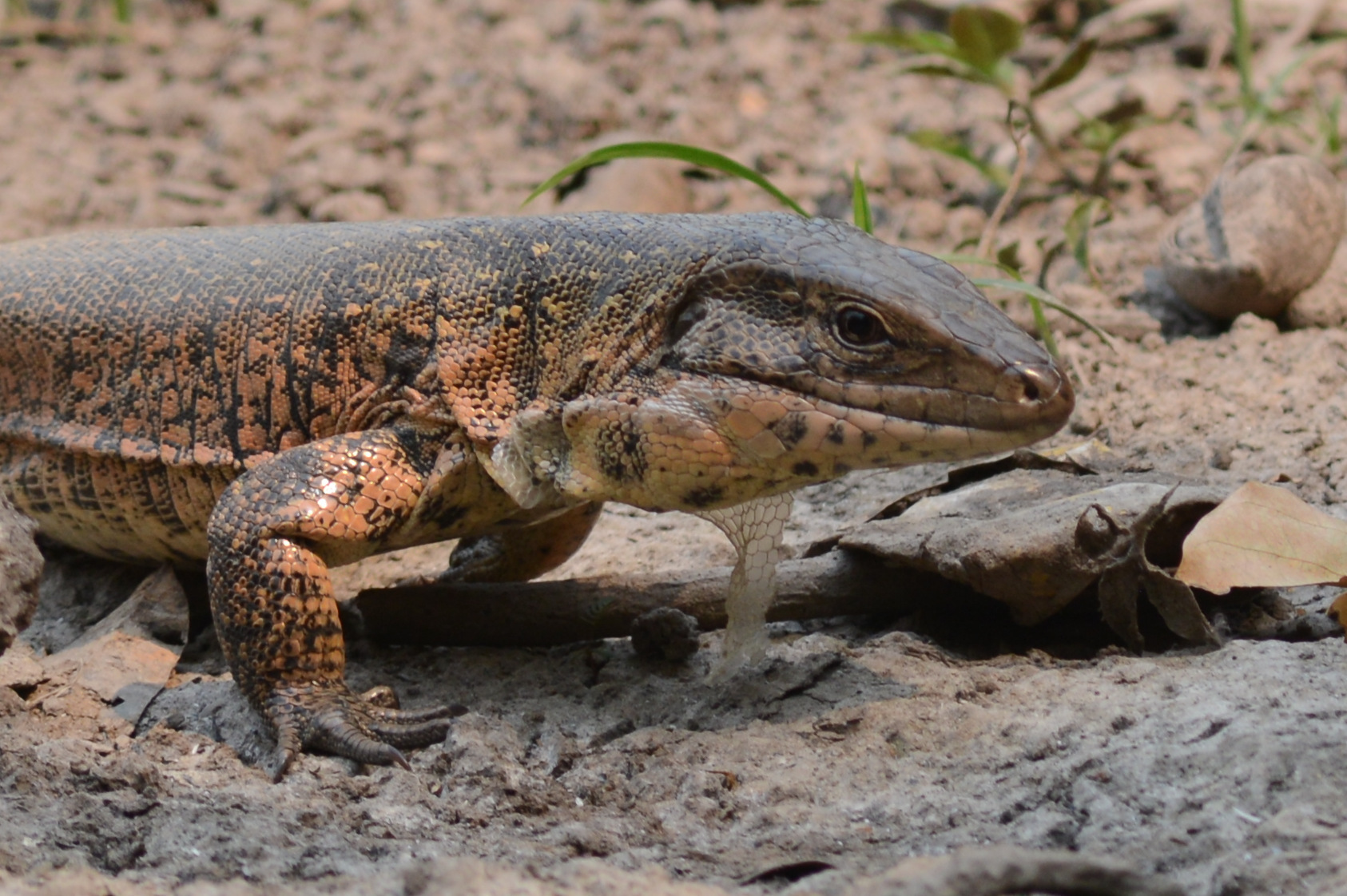
- In Mato Grosso, Brazil

Conservation status
- CITES Appendix II

Scientific classification
- Kingdom: Animalia
- Phylum: Chordata
- Class: Reptilia
- Order: Squamata
- Family: Teiidae
- Genus: Tupinambis
- Species: T. matipu

Binomial name
- Tupinambis matipu Basto da Silva, Ribeiro Jr., & Ávila-Pires, 2018

= Tupinambis matipu =

Species of lizard

Tupinambis matipu is a species of lizard in the family Teiidae. It is endemic to Brazil.

In Mato Grosso, Brazil

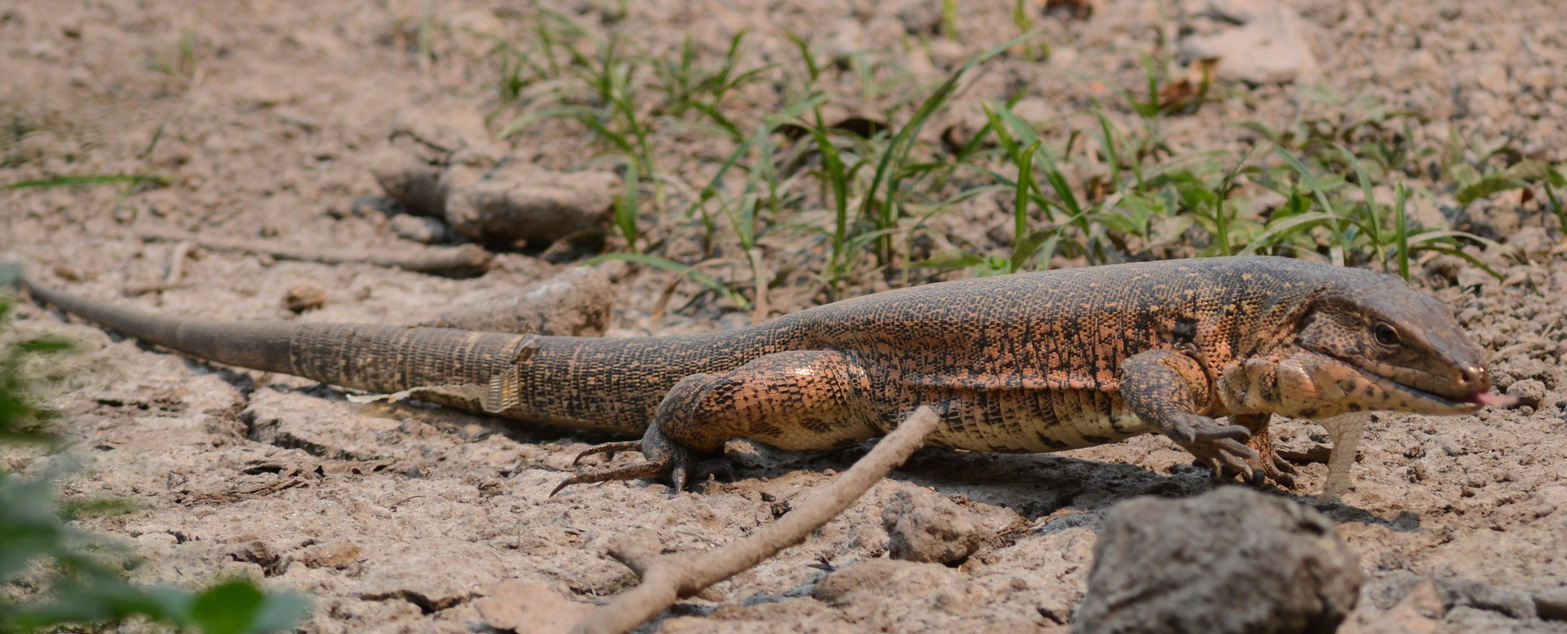

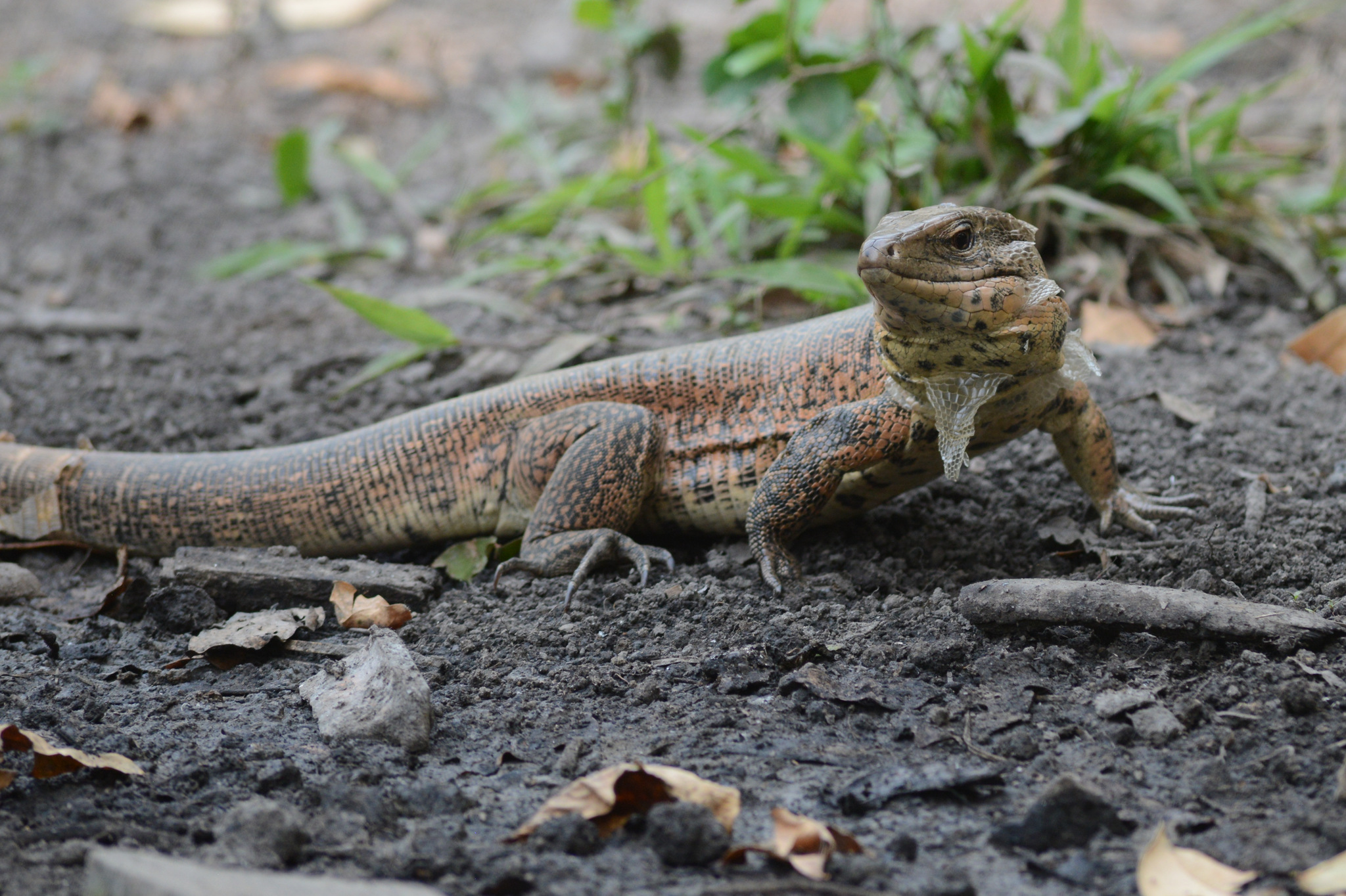

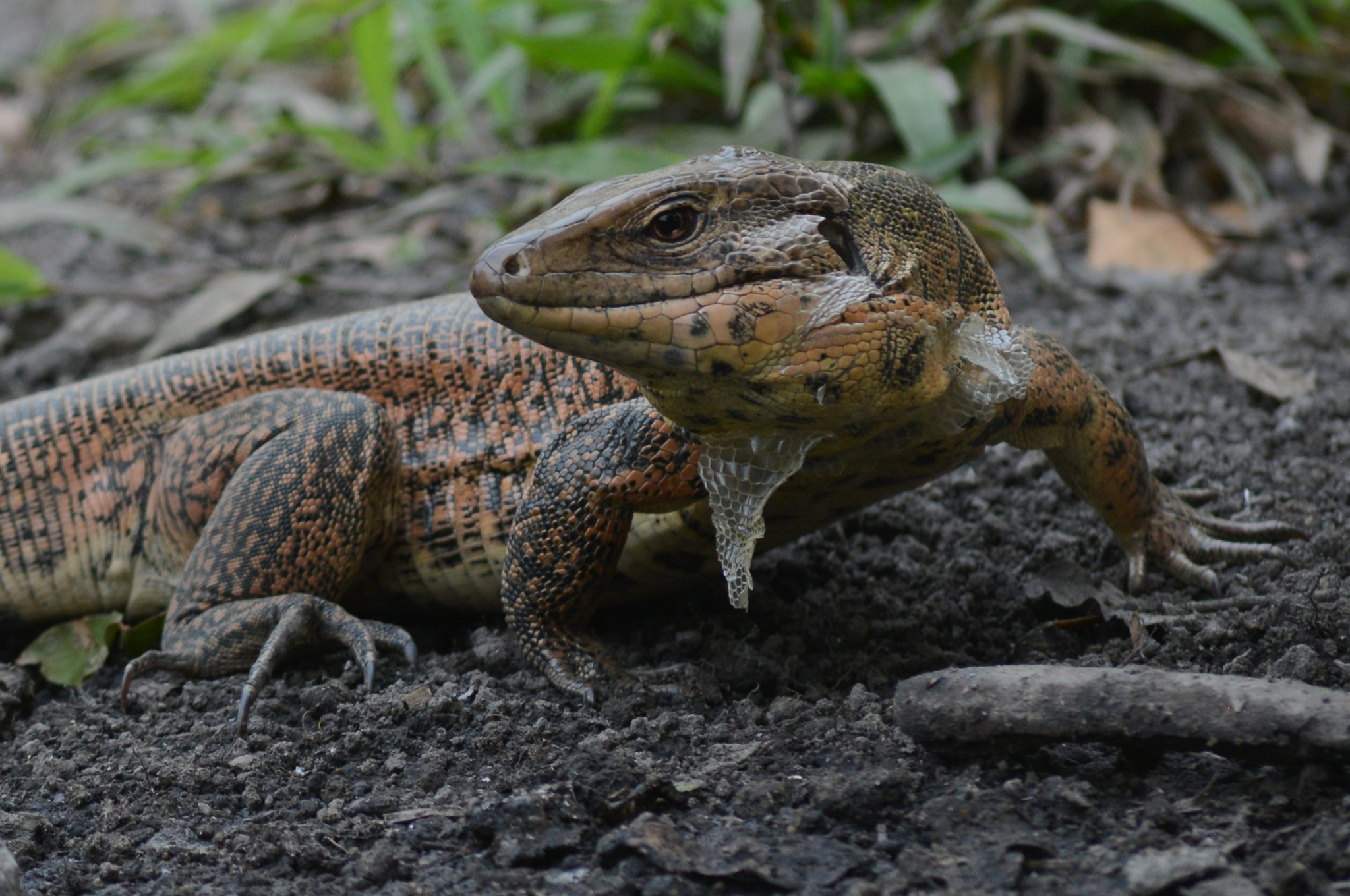

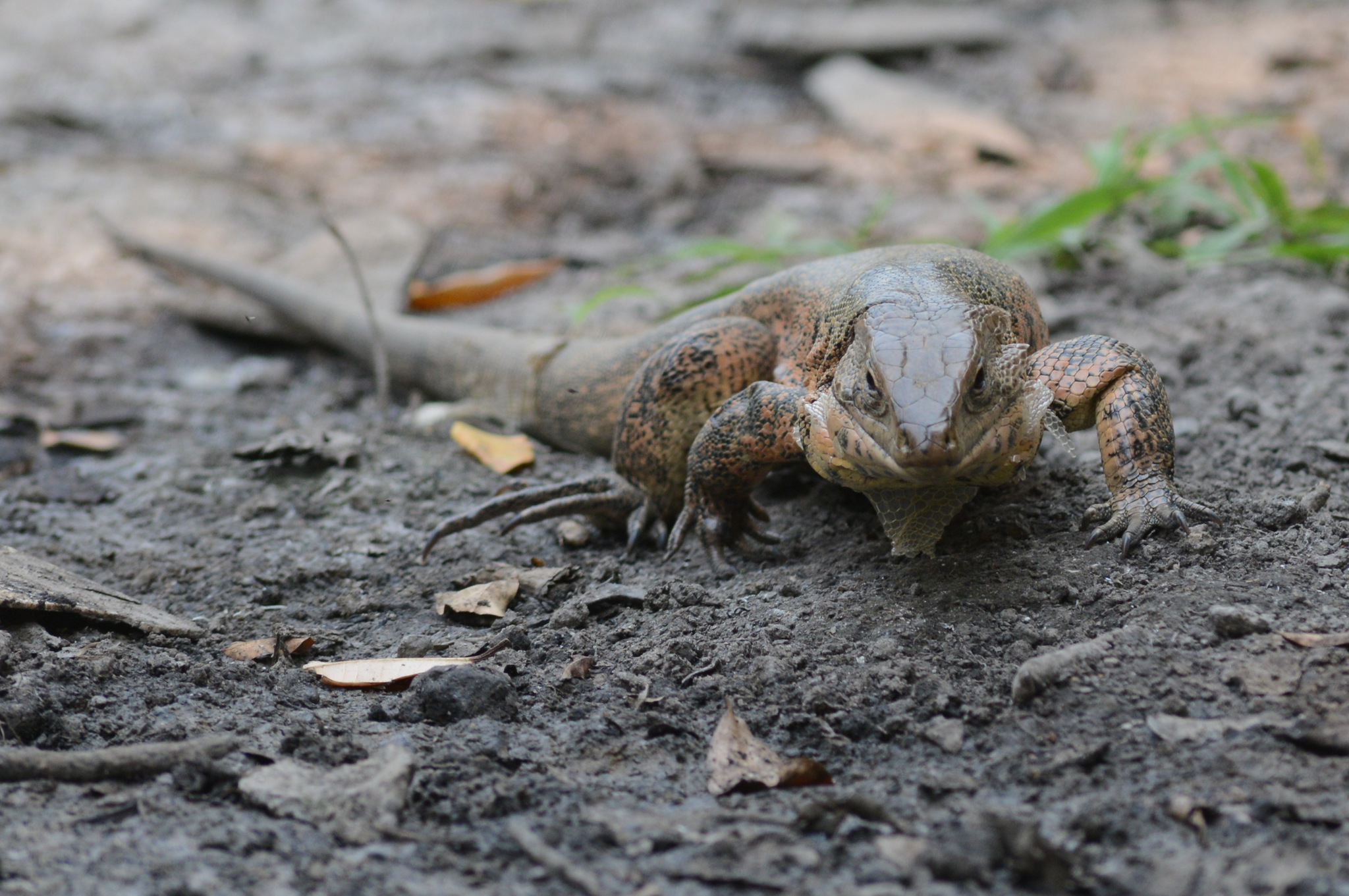

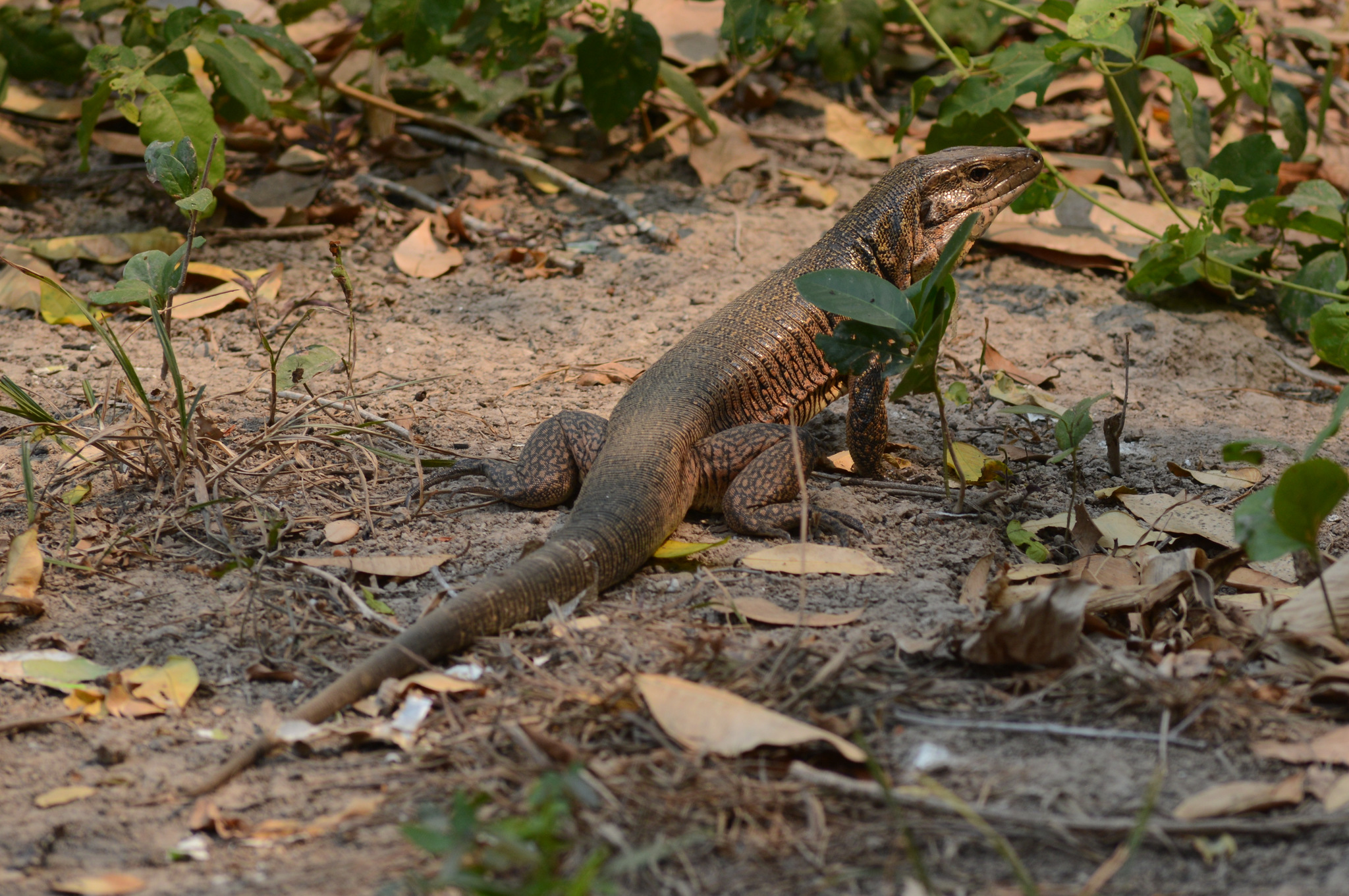
