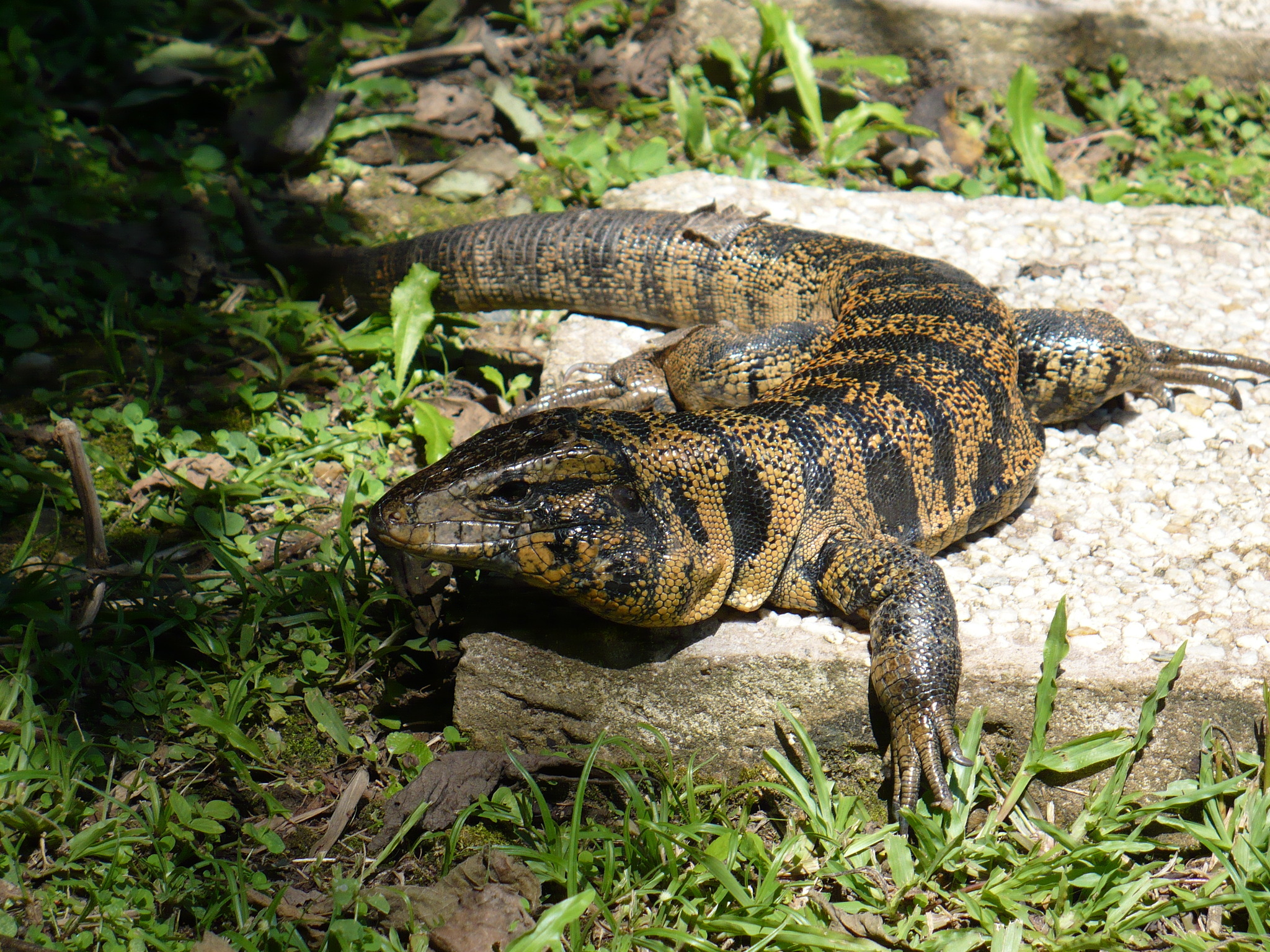
- In Trinidad

Conservation status
- CITES Appendix II

Scientific classification
- Kingdom: Animalia
- Phylum: Chordata
- Class: Reptilia
- Order: Squamata
- Family: Teiidae
- Genus: Tupinambis
- Species: T. cryptus

Binomial name
- Tupinambis cryptus Murphy, Jowers, Lehtinen, Charles, Colli, Peres Jr., Hendry, & Pyron, 2016

= Tupinambis cryptus =

Species of lizard

Tupinambis cryptus, the cryptic golden tegu, is a species of lizard in the family Teiidae. It is found in Venezuela, French Guiana, Guyana, Suriname, Brazil, Colombia and Trinidad and Tobago.

== Gallery ==
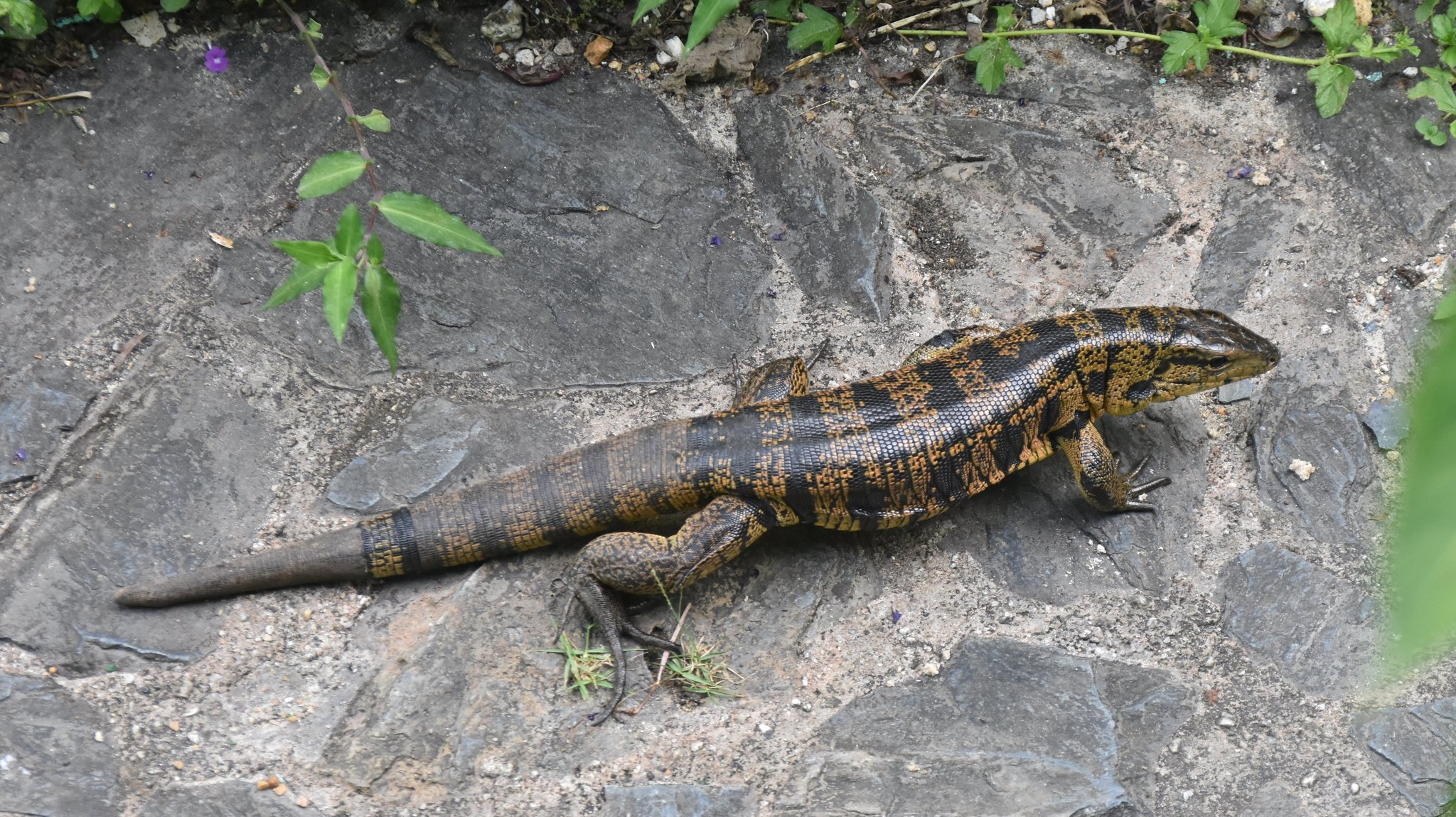
With regrown tail, Trinidad

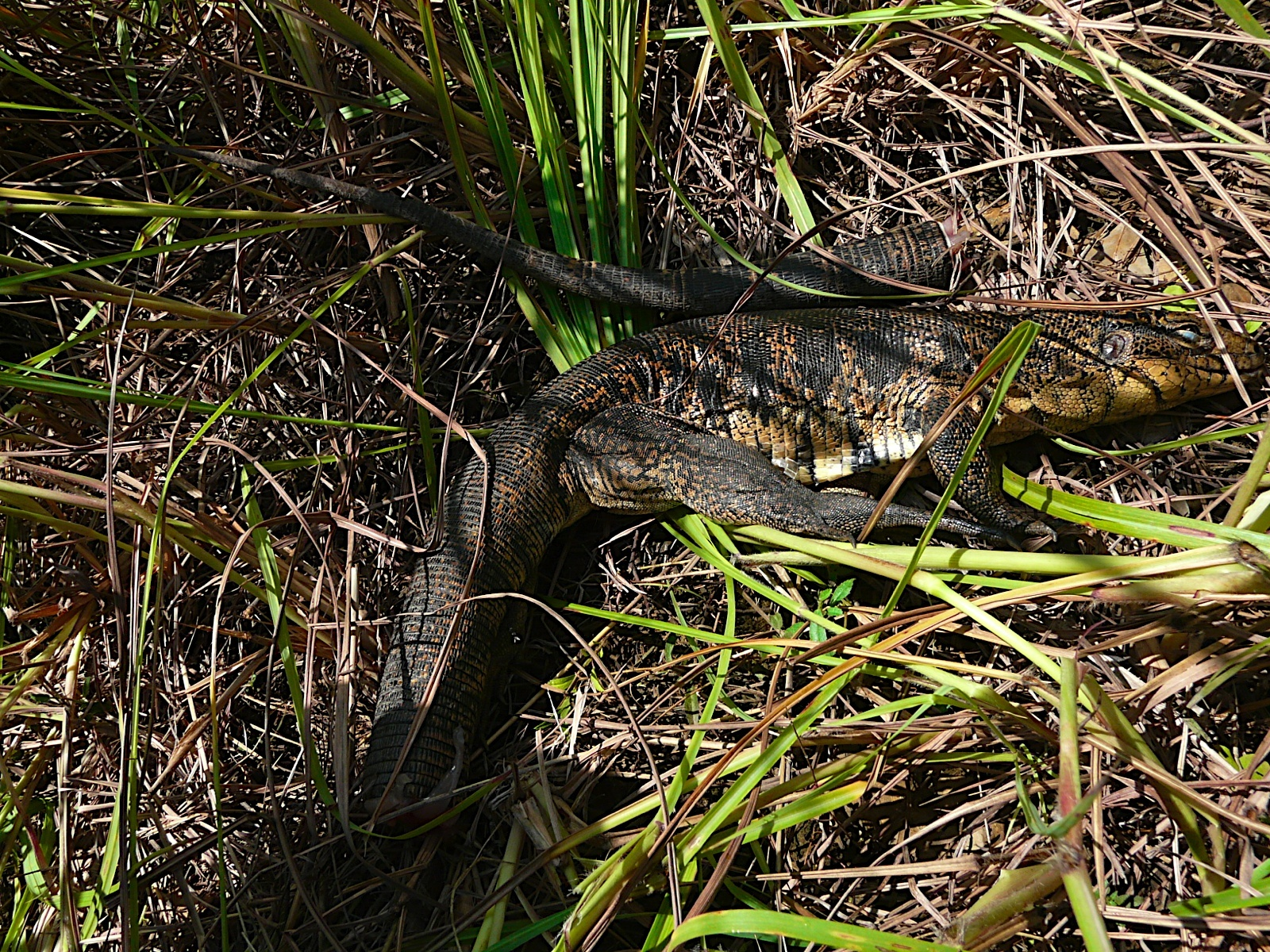
Roadkill with an autotomized tail, Venezuela.

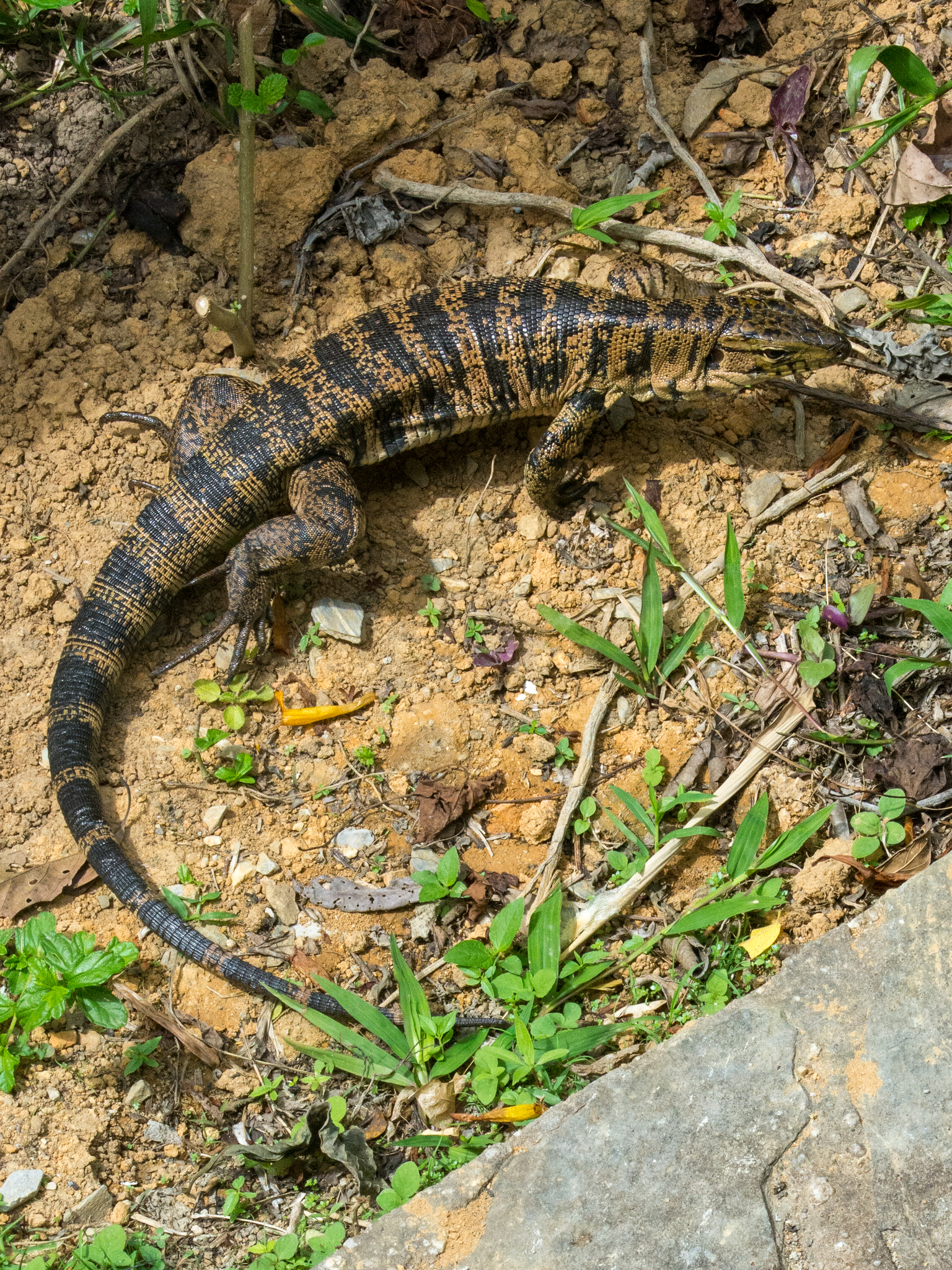
Trinidad

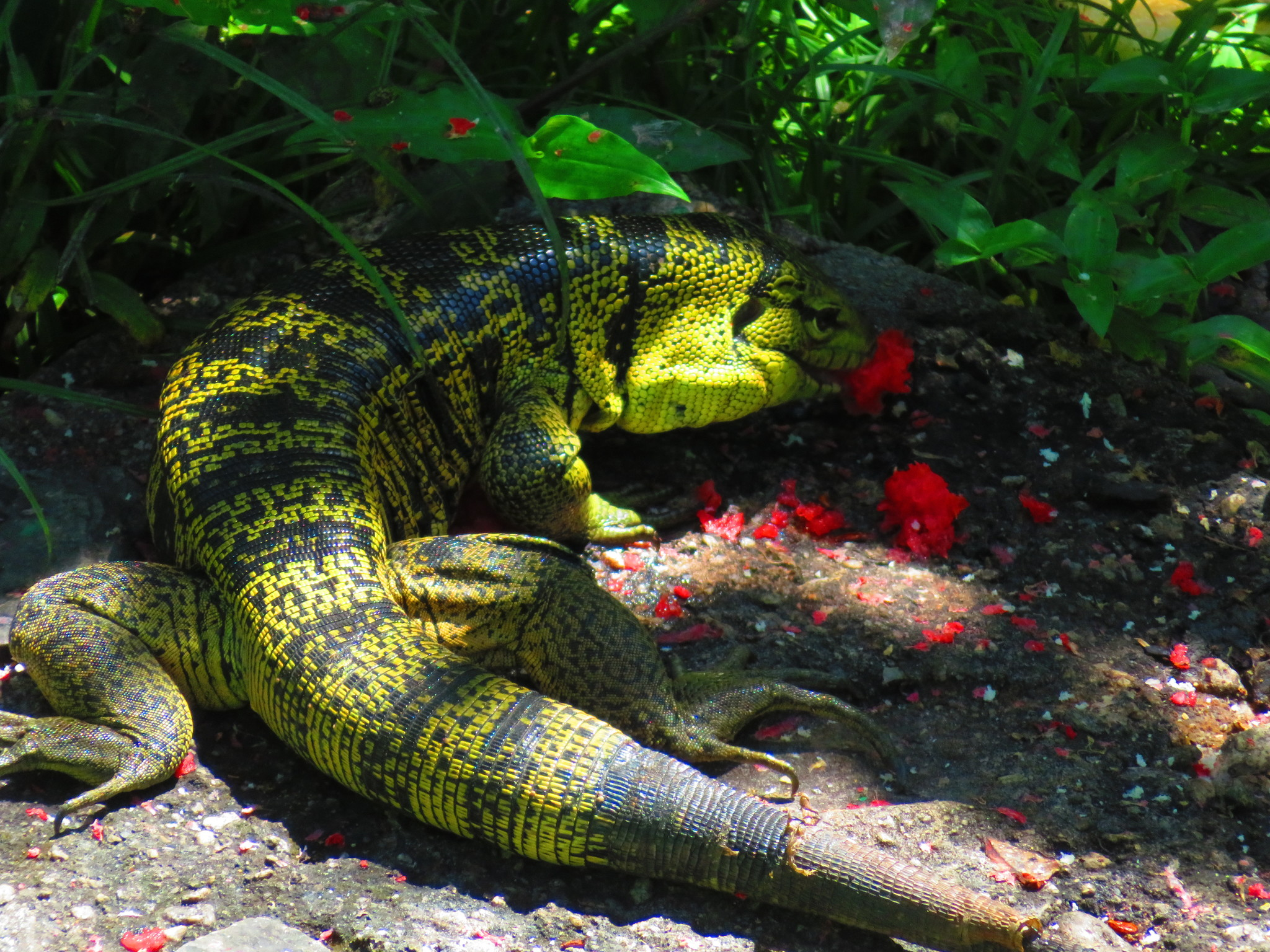
Feeding, Trinidad

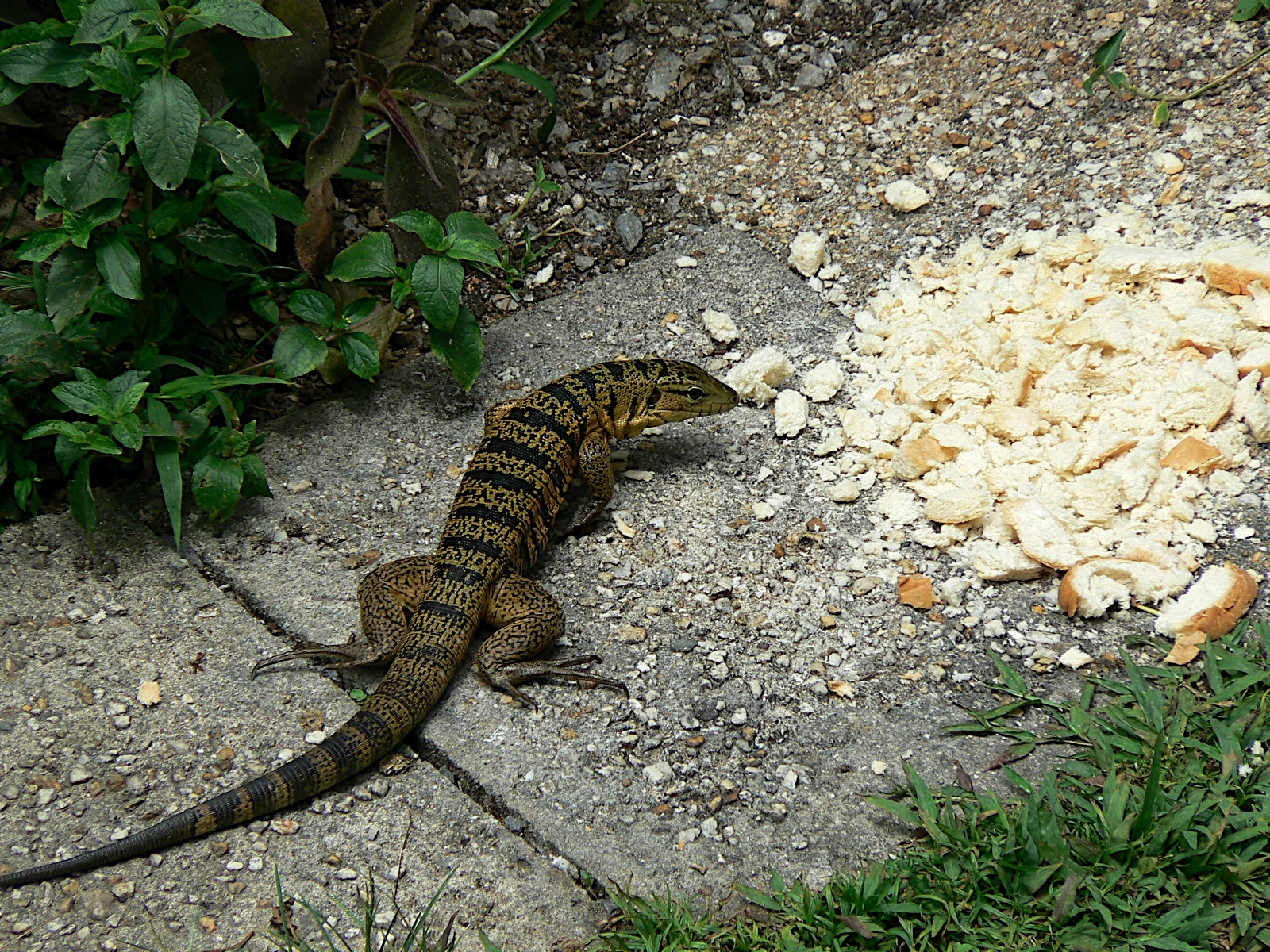
Inspecting bread, Trinidad

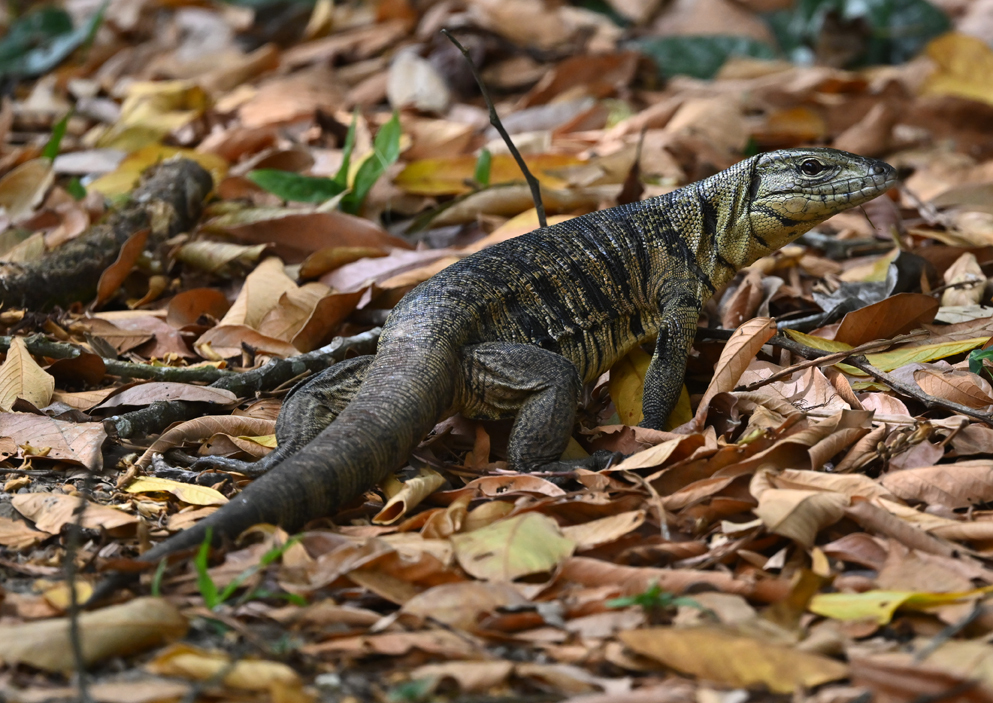
Trinidad
