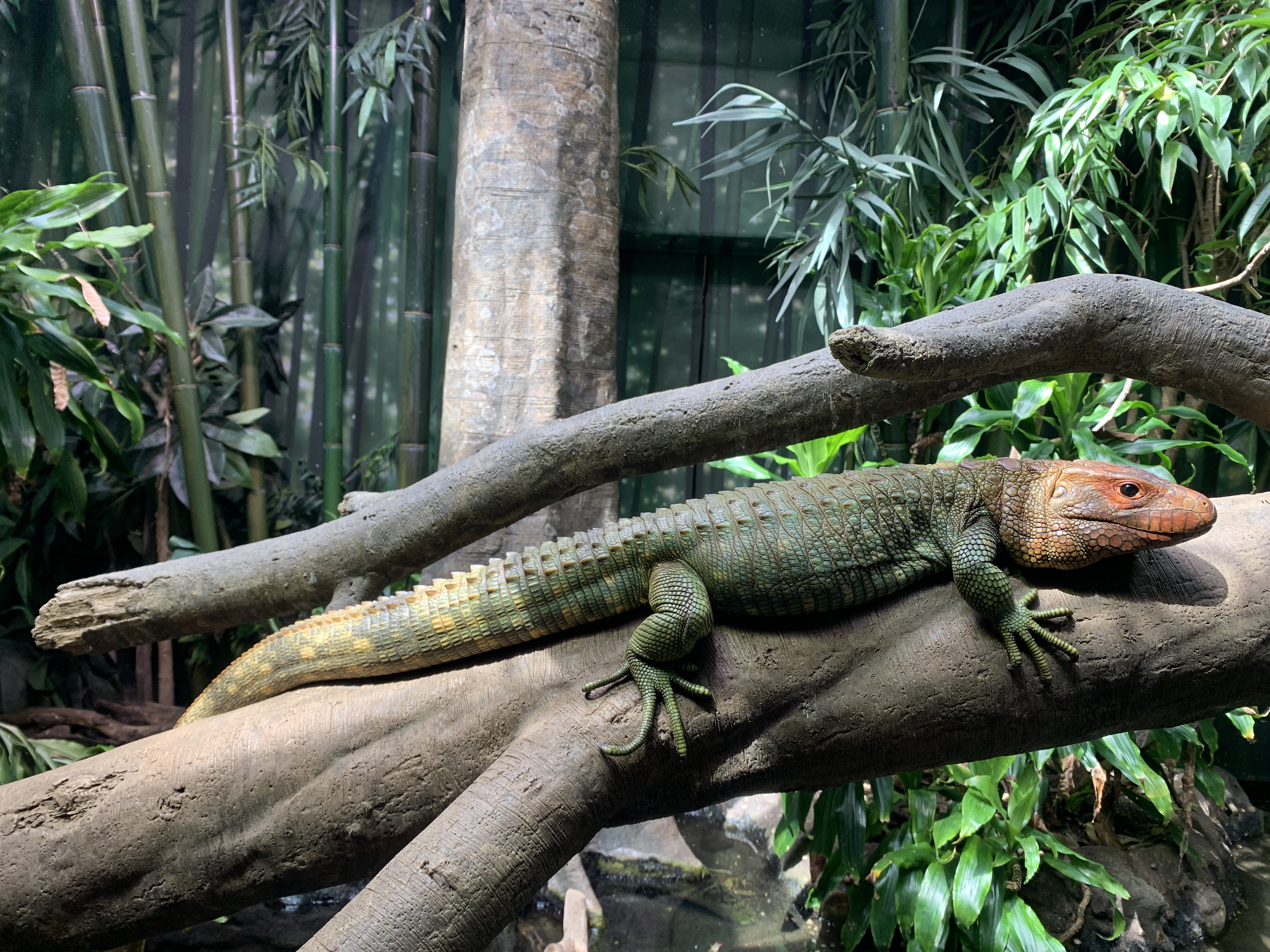
- Northern caiman lizard (D. guianensis)
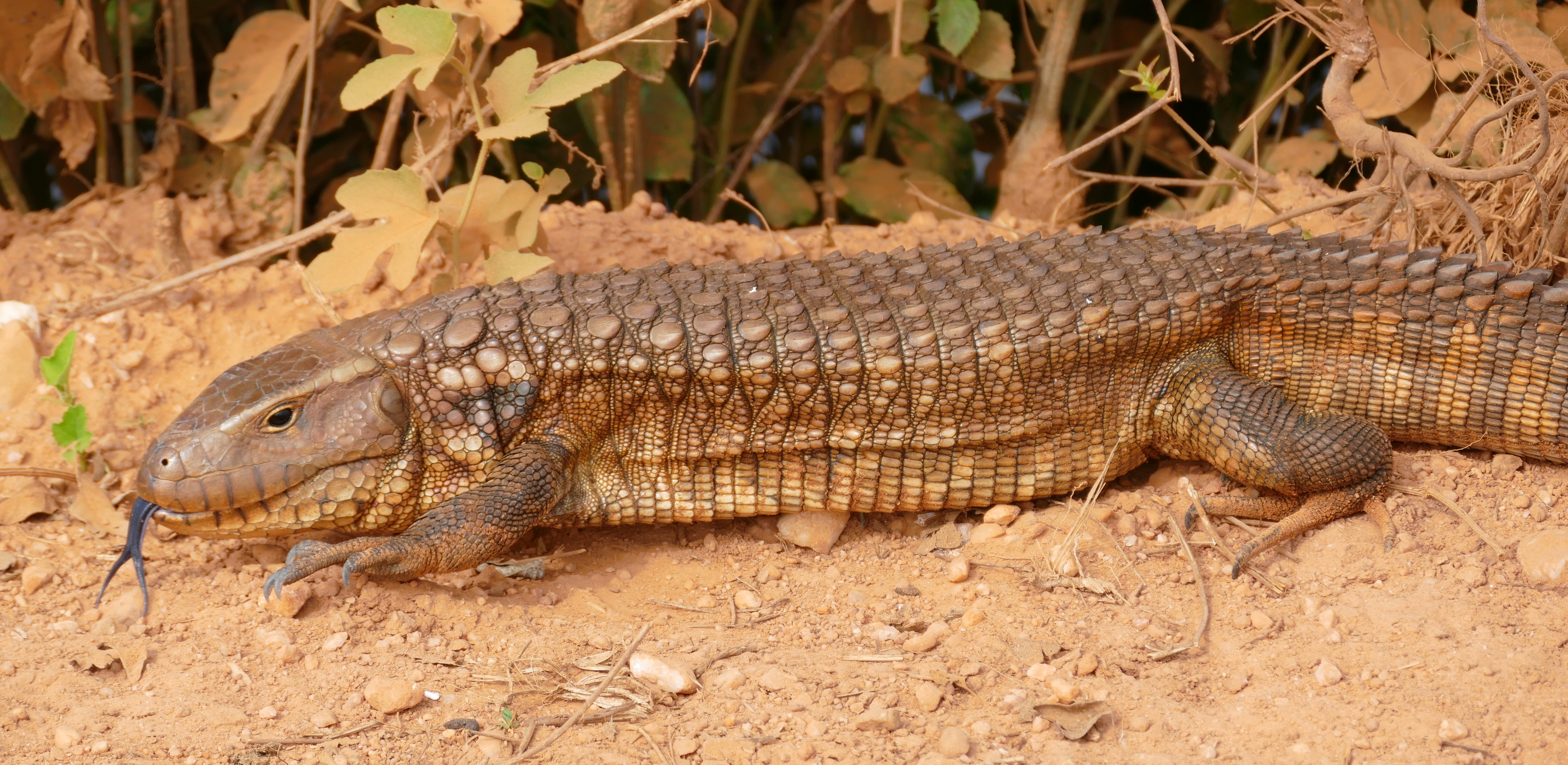
- Paraguay caiman lizard (D. paraguayensis)

Scientific classification
- Kingdom: Animalia
- Phylum: Chordata
- Class: Reptilia
- Order: Squamata
- Family: Teiidae
- Subfamily: Tupinambinae
- Genus: Dracaena; Daudin 1802

Species
- Dracaena guianensis Daudin 1802 (type); Dracaena paraguayensis Amaral 1950; †Paradracaena colombiana Estes 1961

= Dracaena (lizard) =

Dracaena Temporal range: Mid Miocene-recent ~13–0 Ma

Genus of lizards

Dracaena (romanized form of the Ancient Greek δράκαινα - drakaina, "female dragon"), is a genus of lizards, also commonly called caiman lizards or water tegus, in the family Teiidae, along with tegus and ameivas. Caiman lizards are native to South America, where they are found in Brazil, Colombia, Ecuador, Paraguay, and Peru. These semiaquatic lizards spend a lot of time in the water and inhabit marshes, streams, and flooded forests. Caiman lizards often bask on branches overhanging the water.

== Classification ==
=== Extant Species ===
Listed alphabetically.

Image	Scientific name	Common name	Distribution
	Dracaena guianensis Daudin 1802	northern caiman lizard or Guyana caiman lizard	Ecuador, Colombia, Paraguay, Peru and Brazil.
	Dracaena paraguayensis Amaral 1950	Paraguayan caiman lizard	Paraguay, Brazil and Bolivia.

=== Fossils ===
- †Paradracaena colombiana Estes 1961 - the Middle Miocene (Laventan) Honda Group, Colombia

== Description ==
The caiman lizards are built similarly to their cousins the tegus, with a large, heavyset body and short but powerful limbs. Their heads are bulky and often a red or orange color. Their jaws are heavily muscular to help aid in eating its normal prey of snails, crawfish and fresh water clams. They also have a few adaptations that help them in their watery habitat. They have long, laterally flattened tails, similar to their namesake, the yacare caiman. The long tails help the caiman lizards to successfully swim and dive. They also have clear third eyelids which are thought to act like a pair of goggles underwater.

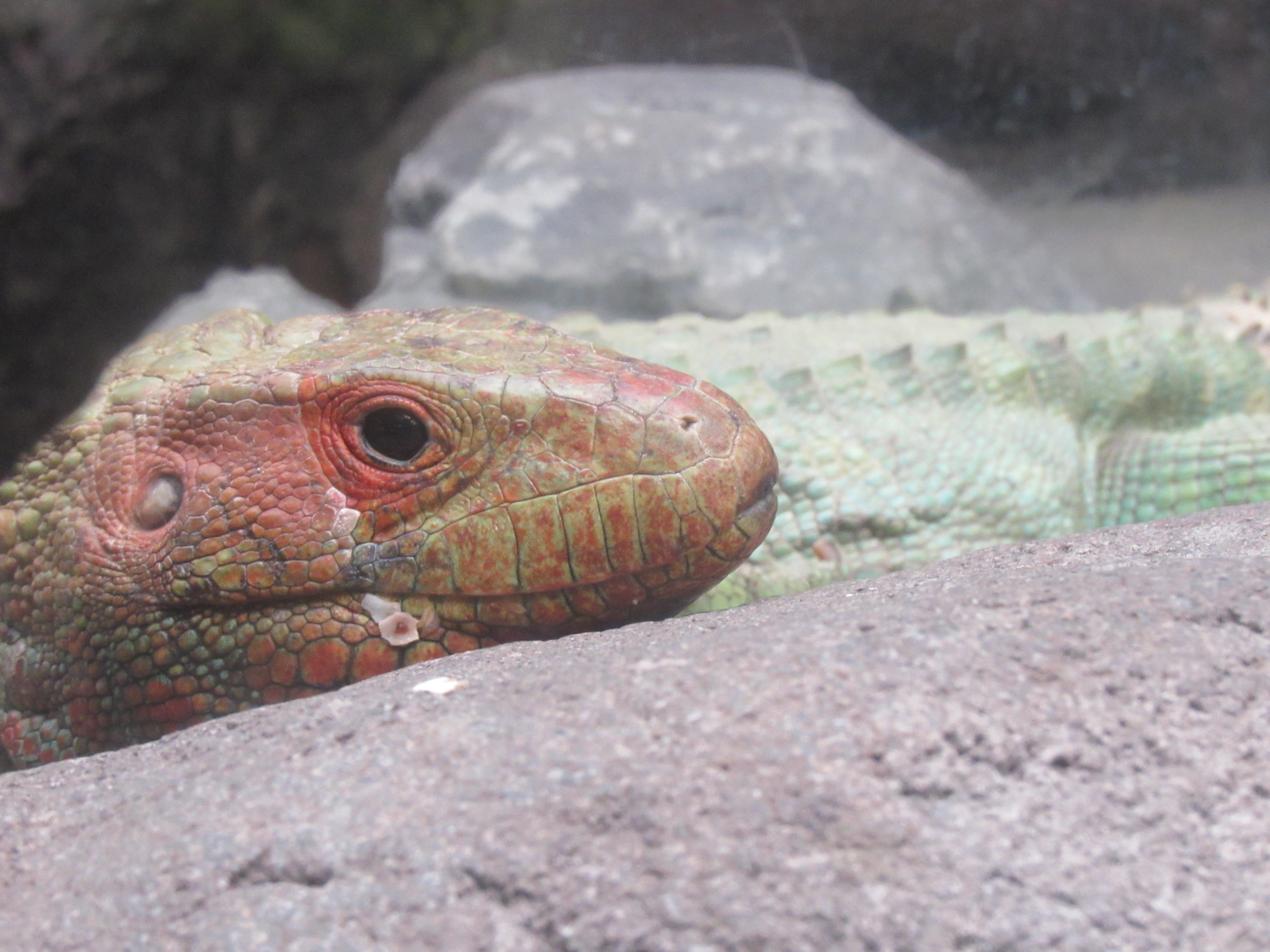

The coloration of the northern caiman lizard (Dracaena guianensis) is very similar to that of a crocodile. It is typically bright green with slight dark green banding. The Paraguayan caiman lizard (Dracaena paraguayensis) is typically much more drab, with a gray body and head. There are tough raised scutes along the dorsal portion of the back. These give the caiman lizards a crocodilian appearance and help to provide some protection against predators. These lizards can become up to 4 ft (1.2 m) long and weigh up to 10 lb (4.5 kg).

== Captivity ==
Caiman lizards are kept in private collections, but they are not yet kept in large numbers due to their tendency to only accept snails and their high price. Additionally, caiman lizards are arboreal, aquatic and burrowing, so suitable enclosures are usually only made by zoos. Caiman lizards born in captivity have been known to take a variety of food items, including snails, fish, cat food and crustaceans. Their temperament is comparable to that of a tegu.
