= Teius suquiensis =

Conservation status
- Least Concern (IUCN 3.1)

Scientific classification
- Kingdom: Animalia
- Phylum: Chordata
- Class: Reptilia
- Order: Squamata
- Suborder: Lacertoidea
- Family: Teiidae
- Genus: Teius
- Species: T. suquiensis

Binomial name
- Teius suquiensis Avila & Martori, 1991

Species of lizard

Teius suquiensis is a species of lizard endemic to Argentina. It was named after the Rio Primero, which was also called the Rio Suquia.
