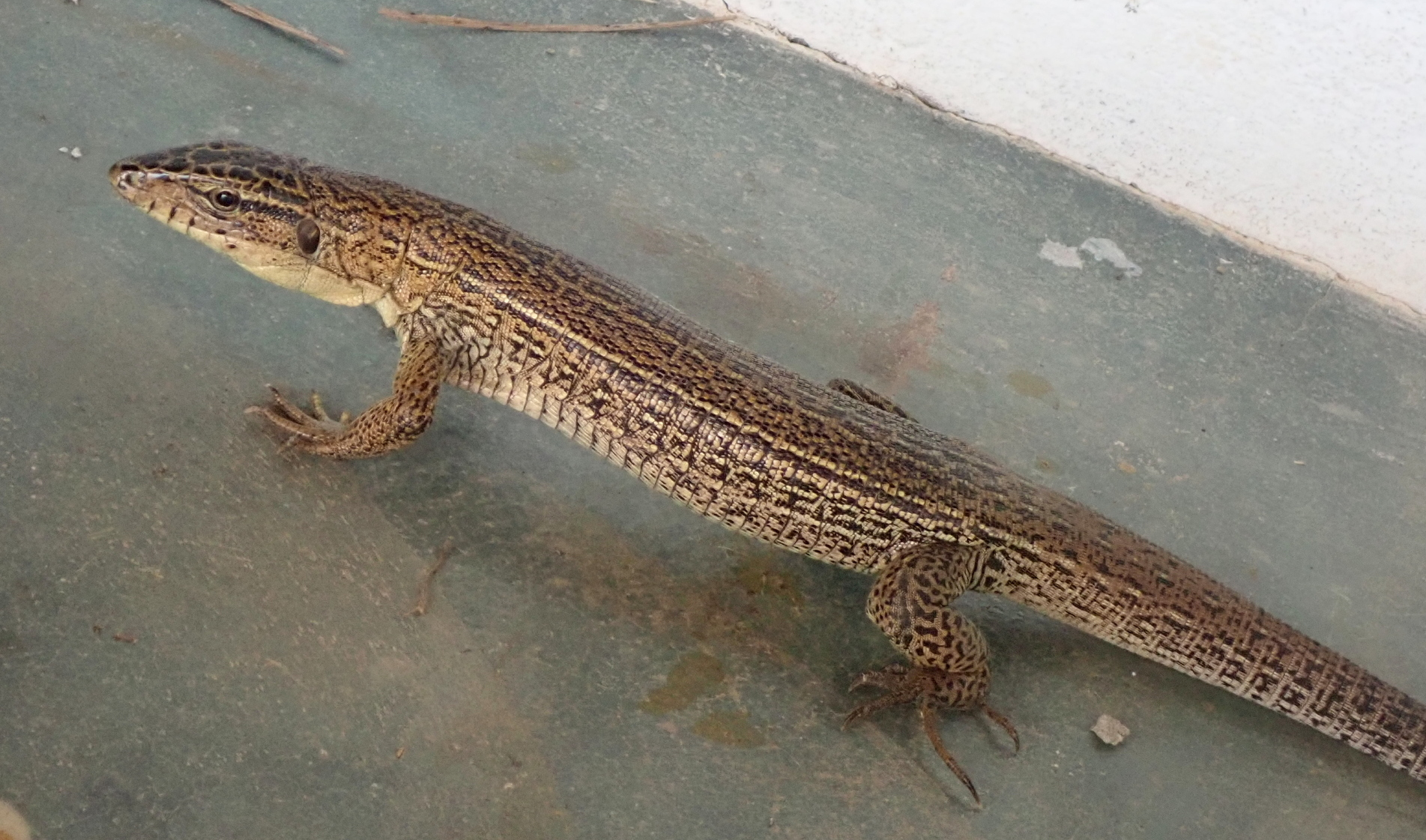

Conservation status
- Least Concern (IUCN 3.1)
- CITES Appendix II (CITES)

Scientific classification
- Kingdom: Animalia
- Phylum: Chordata
- Class: Reptilia
- Order: Squamata
- Suborder: Lacertoidea
- Family: Teiidae
- Genus: Tupinambis
- Species: T. quadrilineatus

Binomial name
- Tupinambis quadrilineatus Manzani & Abe, 1997

= Tupinambis quadrilineatus =

Species of lizard

Tupinambis quadrilineatus, the four-lined tegu, is a species of lizard in the family Teiidae. It is endemic to Brazil and Bolivia.
