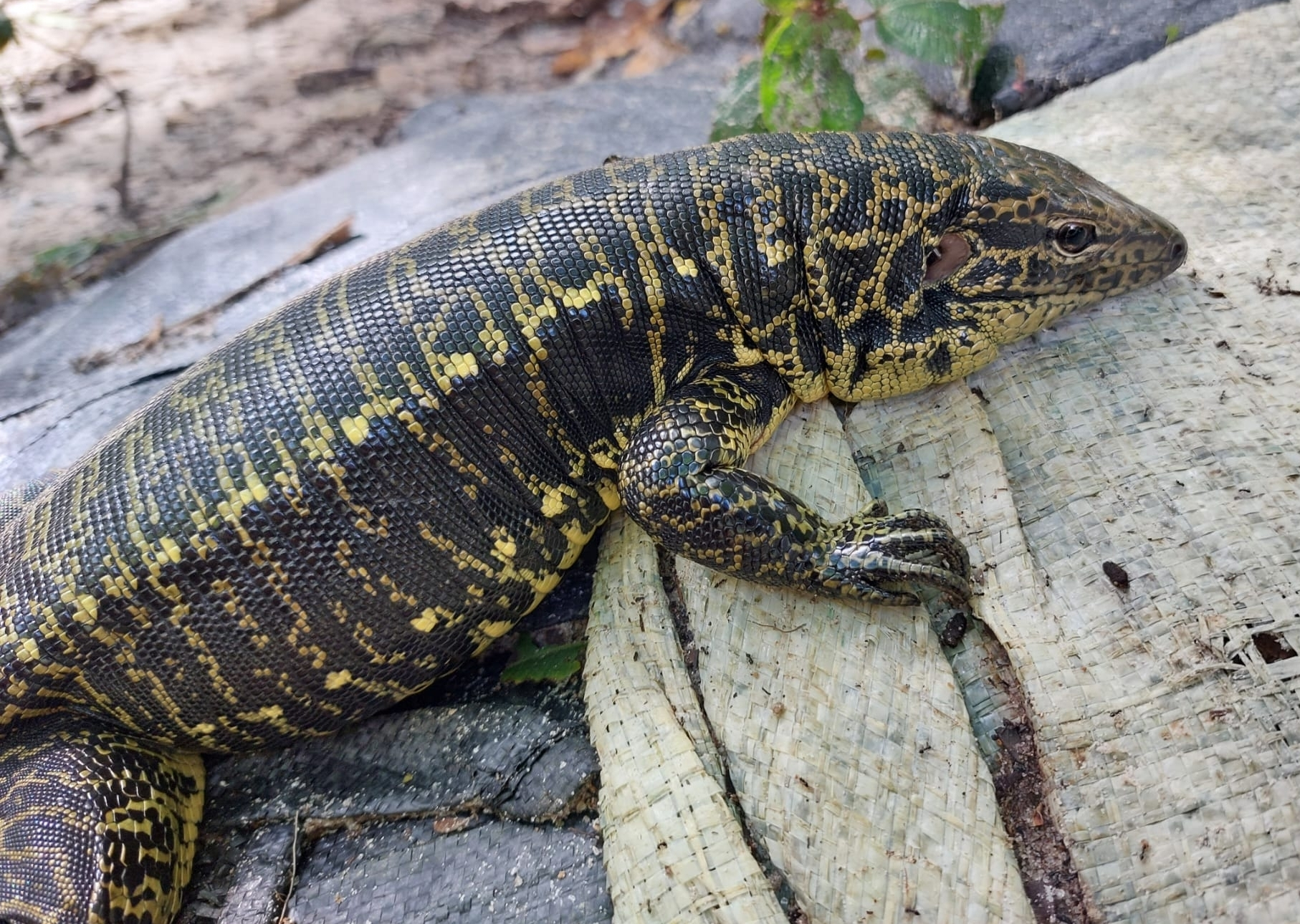
- In Peru

Conservation status
- CITES Appendix II

Scientific classification
- Kingdom: Animalia
- Phylum: Chordata
- Class: Reptilia
- Order: Squamata
- Family: Teiidae
- Genus: Tupinambis
- Species: T. cuzcoensis

Binomial name
- Tupinambis cuzcoensis Murphy, Jowers, Lehtinen, Charles, Colli, Peres Jr., Hendry, & Pyron, 2016

= Tupinambis cuzcoensis =

Species of lizard

Tupinambis cuzcoensis, the Cusco tegu, is a species of lizard in the family Teiidae. It is found in Peru, Ecuador and Bolivia.

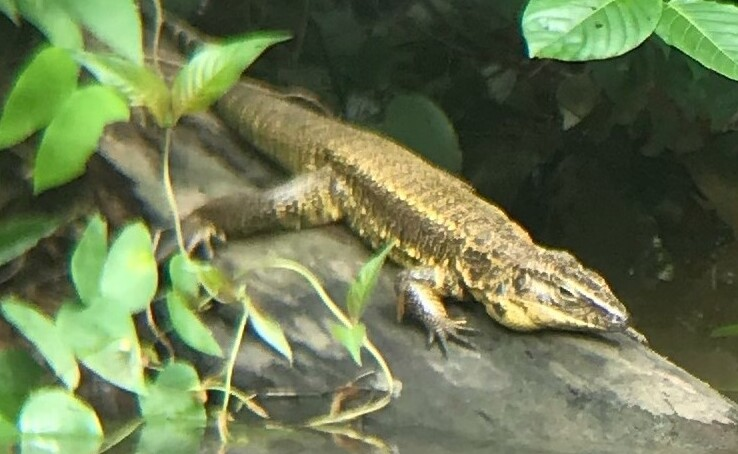
In Peru

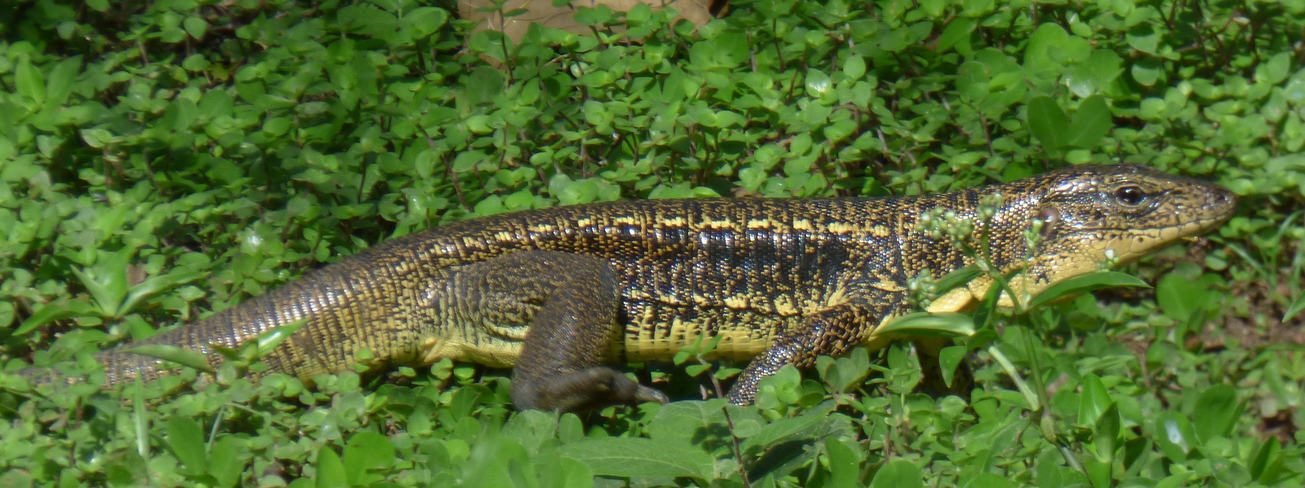
In Peru
