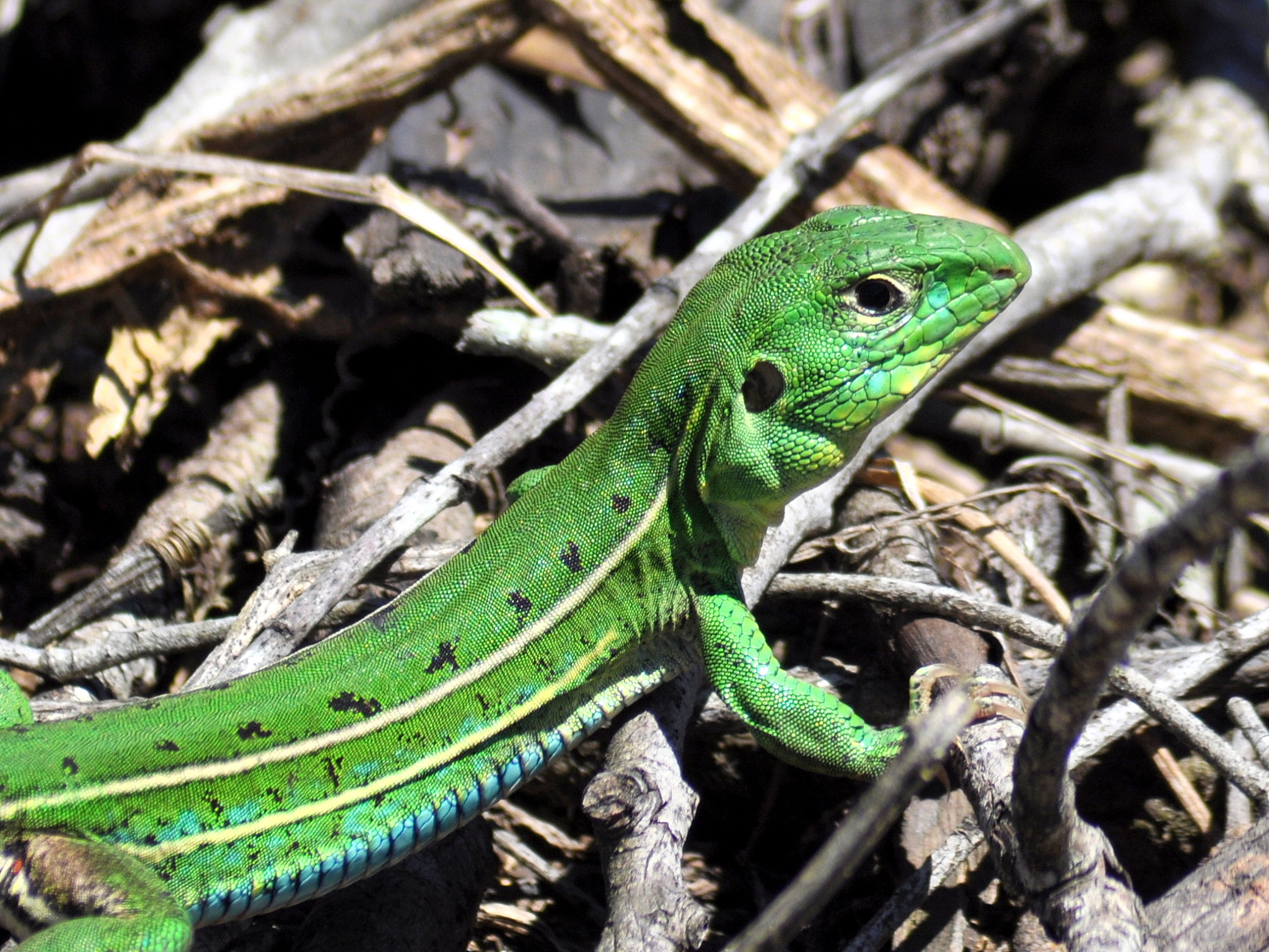

Conservation status
- Least Concern (IUCN 3.1)

Scientific classification
- Kingdom: Animalia
- Phylum: Chordata
- Class: Reptilia
- Order: Squamata
- Suborder: Lacertoidea
- Family: Teiidae
- Genus: Teius
- Species: T. oculatus

Binomial name
- Teius oculatus (d'Orbigny & Bibron, 1837)

= Teius oculatus =

Species of lizard

Teius oculatus is a species of lizard. It is found in southern Brazil, eastern Paraguay, Uruguay, and central and eastern Argentina. It is a common species inhabiting humid Chaco, Espinal, and Paranaense, subtropical dry forest, and Pampean grasslands.

Teius oculatus is oviparous.
