= Tupinambis longilineus =

Conservation status
- CITES Appendix II

Scientific classification
- Kingdom: Animalia
- Phylum: Chordata
- Class: Reptilia
- Order: Squamata
- Family: Teiidae
- Genus: Tupinambis
- Species: T. longilineus

Binomial name
- Tupinambis longilineus Ávila-Pires, 1995

Species of lizard

Tupinambis longilineus, the Rondonia tegu, is a species of lizard in the family Teiidae. It is endemic to Brazil and north Bolivia.
