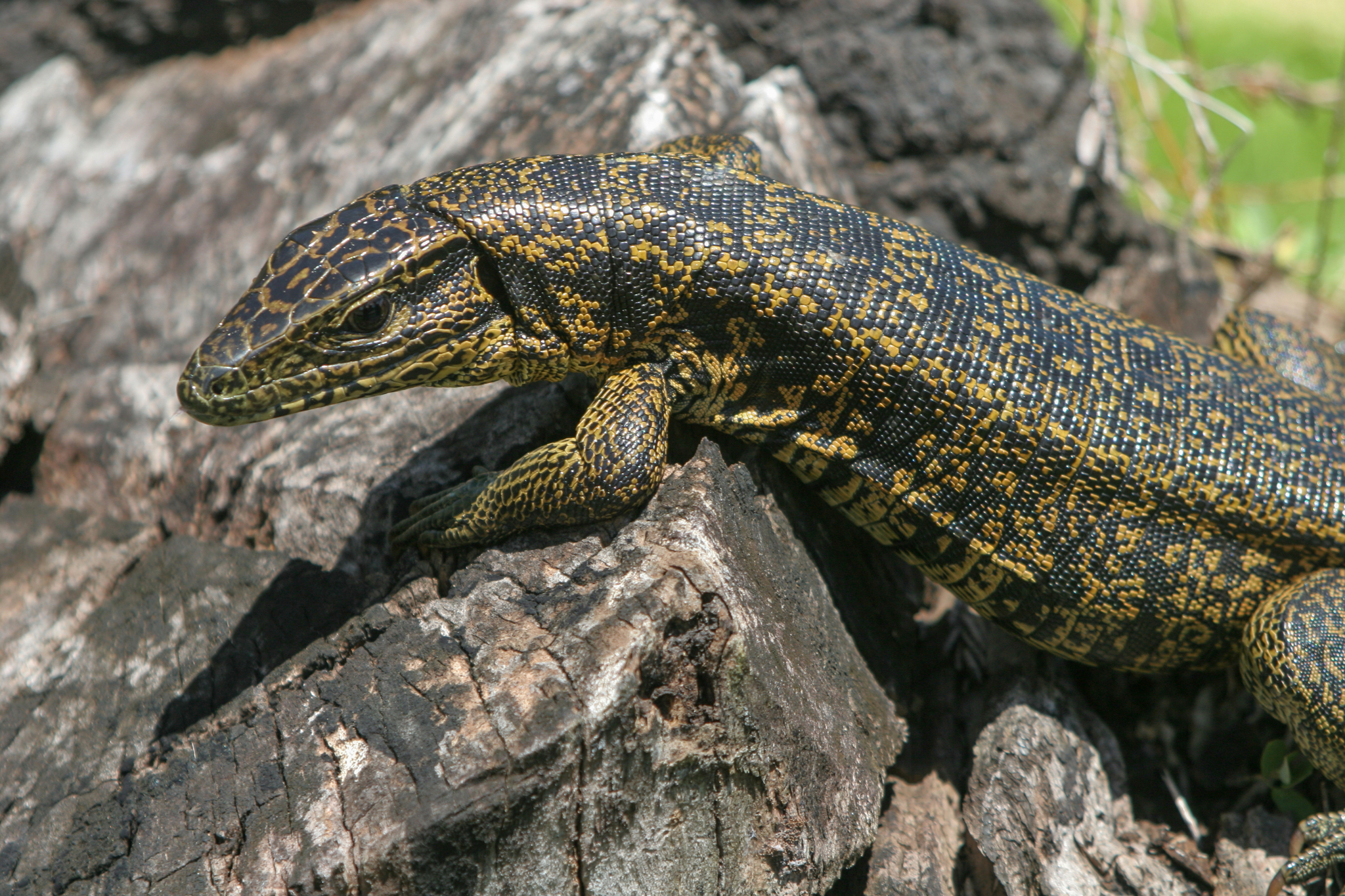
- Gold tegu (Tupinambis teguixin)

Scientific classification
- Kingdom: Animalia
- Phylum: Chordata
- Class: Reptilia
- Order: Squamata
- Family: Teiidae
- Genus: Tupinambis; Daudin, 1802

Type species
- Tupinambis monitor Daudin 1802

= Tupinambis =

Genus of lizards

Tupinambis is a lizard genus which belongs to the family Teiidae and contains eight described species. These large lizards are commonly referred to as tegus. They are primarily found in South America, although T. teguixin also occurs in Panama.

In 2012, a number of tegu species were reclassified from Tupinambis to the previously used genus Salvator. The newly proposed classification comes from a restructuring of the family Teiidae based upon the study of 137 morphological characteristics. The new classification is as follows: Salvator duseni (yellow tegu), Salvator rufescens (red tegu), Salvator merianae (Argentine black and white tegu), Tupinambis teguixin (gold tegu), Tupinambis longilineus (Rhondonia tegu), Tupinambis palustris (swamp tegu) and Tupinambis quadrilineatus (four-lined tegu).

== Etymology ==
Tupinambis lizards are called teiú in Portuguese. The lizards are also called tishiriú in the extinct Tuxá language of Bahia, Brazil, and dzižuảsu in the extinct Potiguara language of Pernambuco, Brazil.

As with many other animals from tropical South America (e.g. the Cariamae), Tupinambis owes its scientific name to the pioneering accounts given by Piso & Marcgrave in their Historia Naturalis Brasiliae (1648). However, a misinterpretation (by Linnaeus) of the Latin text occurred, which reads "TEIVGVACV [...] Tupinambis", 'to the Tupinambá [Indigenous group] TEIVGVACU'. Tupinambis was merely a metalinguistic term meaning 'to/for the Tupinambá,' whereas the intended, indigenous name for the animal was teiú-guaçú [lizard-big]; lit. 'big lizard'.

== Description ==
The Tupinambis species have heterodont dentition consisting of four different types of teeth. Incisor-type—tricuspid—teeth reside at the tip of the mouth. Recurved canine-type teeth occur further back on the tooth row. Behind those reside a separate set of incisor-like teeth (though flattened in a perpendicular plane to the first set of incisors). The rearmost teeth are blunt, rounded, peg-shaped teeth. The rearmost two tooth classes only occur in sexually mature individuals, thus indicating an ontogenetic shift in tooth morphology. Along with changes in tooth type, the frequency of each tooth type also changes with ontogeny, without an overall change in tooth count (approximately 70 teeth). Rather than increase tooth count, the teeth themselves increase in size as the jaw grows from hatchling to adult. This ontogenetic shift in tooth morphology suggests a shift in diet with age; however, few dietary studies have been done to support this claim and limited stomach content observations do not show much variability between hatchlings and juveniles. T. teguxin is an omnivore, consuming both fruit and as well as invertebrate and vertebrate prey.

== Taxonomy ==
Species listed alphabetically by specific name.

Species	Common name	Image
Tupinambis cryptus Murphy, Jowers, Lehtinen, Charles, Colli, Peres Jr., Hendry, & Pyron, 2016	cryptic golden tegu	
Tupinambis cuzcoensis Murphy, Jowers, Lehtinen, Charles, Colli, Peres Jr., Hendry, & Pyron, 2016	Cusco tegu	
Tupinambis longilineus Ávila-Pires, 1995	Rondonia tegu	
Tupinambis matipu Silva, Ribeiro-Junior, & Ávila-Pires, 2018		
Tupinambis palustris Manzani & Abe, 2002	swamp tegu	
Tupinambis quadrilineatus Manzani & Abe, 1997	four-lined tegu	
Tupinambis teguixin (Linnaeus, 1758)	gold tegu	
Tupinambis zuliensis Murphy, Jowers, Lehtinen, Charles, Colli, Peres Jr., Hendry, & Pyron, 2016	Maracaibo Basin tegu	

== Evolution ==
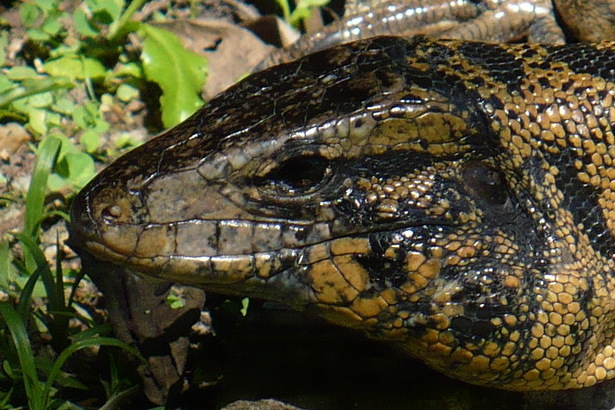
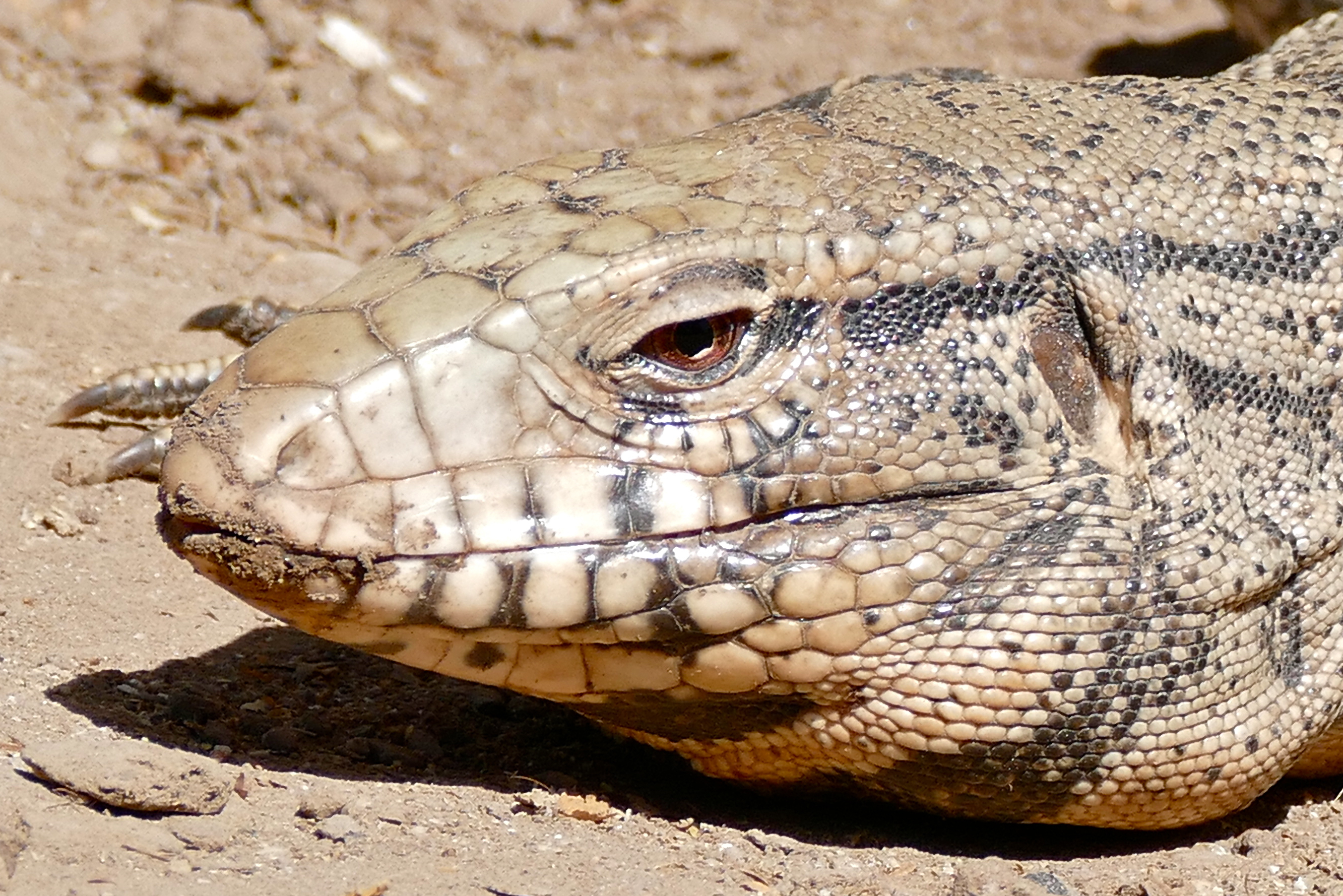
Tupinambis (top) has only one pair of loreal scales between the eye and nostril, while Salvator (bottom) has two

Mitochondrial DNA analysis indicates a deep divergence between a northern clade (containing T. teguixin, T. palustris and T. quadrilineatus) and a southern clade (containing T. duseni). The northern and southern clades are morphologically distinct, with the northern clade possessing a single pair of loreal scales between the eye and the nostril and a smooth texture to the scales on the body and the southern clade possessing two pairs of loreal scales and a bumpy texture to the scales on the body. At least one review of the morphology of the family Teiidae has placed the tegus of the southern clade in the genus Salvator. Subsequent studies support the paraphyletic status of Tupinambis, though further research will be necessary to determine if the split will gain wider acceptance among the herpetological community. Comparative analysis of hemipenial anatomy also provides support for the split between Tupinambis and Salvator.

Tegus probably originated sometime during the Cenozoic era. Tupinambis fossils from Argentina date back to the Late Miocene, and further remains are also known from the Pleistocene of northwestern Argentina. Fossils of the extinct tegu Paradracaena can be found in earlier Miocene deposits.
