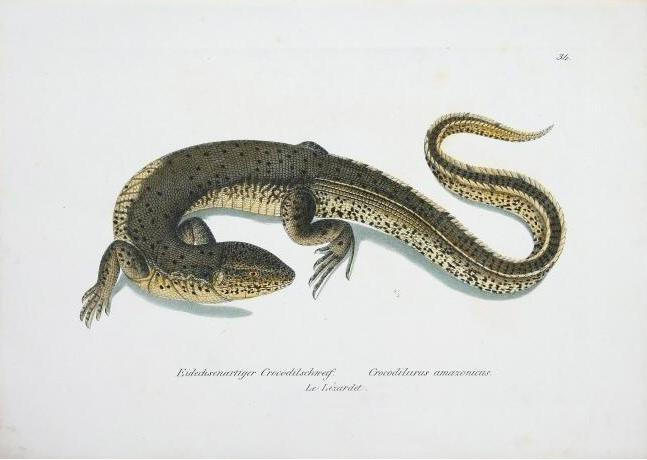
- Artist's historical rendition.

Conservation status
- Least Concern (IUCN 3.1)
- CITES Appendix II

Scientific classification
- Kingdom: Animalia
- Phylum: Chordata
- Class: Reptilia
- Order: Squamata
- Suborder: Lacertoidea
- Family: Teiidae
- Genus: Crocodilurus; Spix, 1825
- Species: C. amazonicus

Binomial name
- Crocodilurus amazonicus Spix, 1825

= Crocodilurus =

Crocodile tegu

Genus of lizards

Crocodilurus is a monotypic lizard genus consisting of one species, Crocodilurus amazonicus, belonging to the family Teiidae (tegus, ameivas and whiptails). Its common name is the crocodile tegu, due to its appearance and fondness for water, and is locally known as the jacarerana. This semi-aquatic, predatory lizard has a flattened, paddle-like tail, enabling it to swim with ease.

== Figurative name ==
The crocodile tegu has no close relation to crocodilians. The name Crocodilurus amazonicus ("Amazonian little crocodile") is only an analogy: It is a predatory reptile well adapted to living and hunting in water.

== Distribution ==
C. amazonicus is found in the Amazon Basin and the Guiana Shield in South America.

== Diet ==
C. amazonicus preys upon arthropods, fish, amphibians, and reptiles.

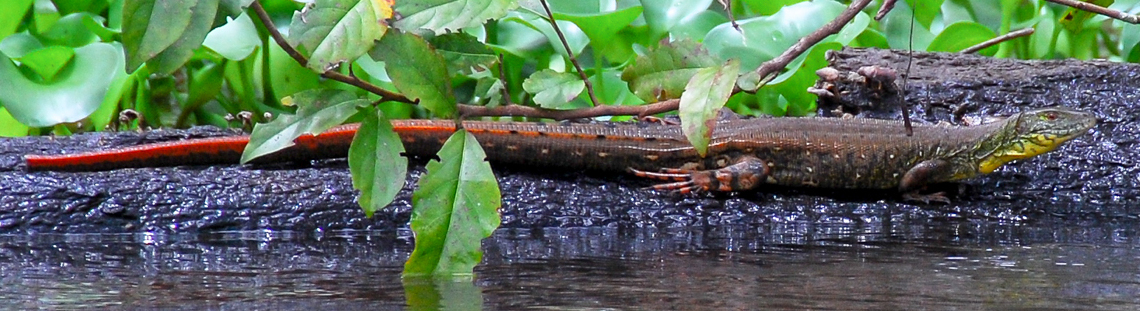
Amazonas, Brazil
