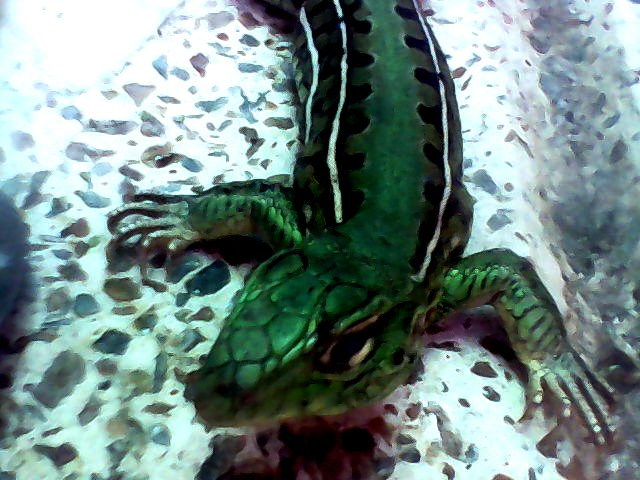
- Teius oculatus

Scientific classification
- Kingdom: Animalia
- Phylum: Chordata
- Class: Reptilia
- Order: Squamata
- Family: Teiidae
- Subfamily: Teiinae
- Genus: Teius; Merrem, 1820

= Teius =

Genus of lizards

Teius is a genus of lizards in the family Teiidae. The genus is native to South America.

== Species ==
The genus Teius contains the following three species, listed alphabetically.

- Teius oculatus (D'Orbigny & Bibron, 1837)
- Teius suquiensis Ávila & Martori, 1991
- Teius teyou (Daudin, 1802) – four-toed tegu

Nota bene: A binomial authority in parentheses indicates that the species was originally described in a genus other than Teius.
