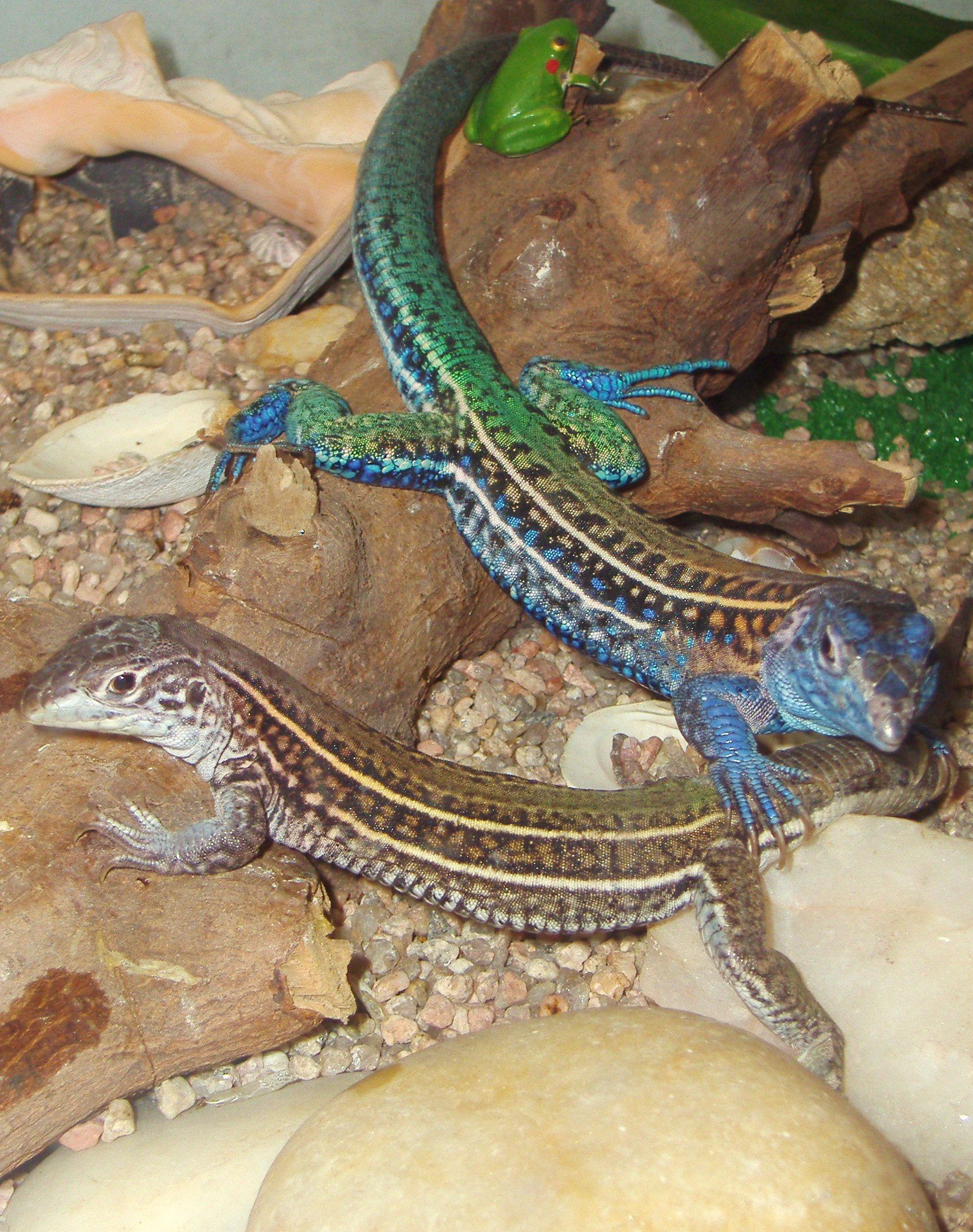
- Male (top), female (bottom)

Conservation status
- Least Concern (IUCN 3.1)

Scientific classification
- Kingdom: Animalia
- Phylum: Chordata
- Class: Reptilia
- Order: Squamata
- Family: Teiidae
- Genus: Teius
- Species: T. teyou

Binomial name
- Teius teyou (Daudin, 1802)

= Teius teyou =

Four-toed tegu

Species of lizard

Teius teyou, the four-toed tegu, is one of the most common South American lizards. It belongs to the genus Teius and the family Teiidae.

It is found from southern Brazil to Argentina. It lives on open land and often takes cover in rocky areas. It makes a tunnel for itself under soil and rocks to hide from enemies. It feeds on insects and spiders.
