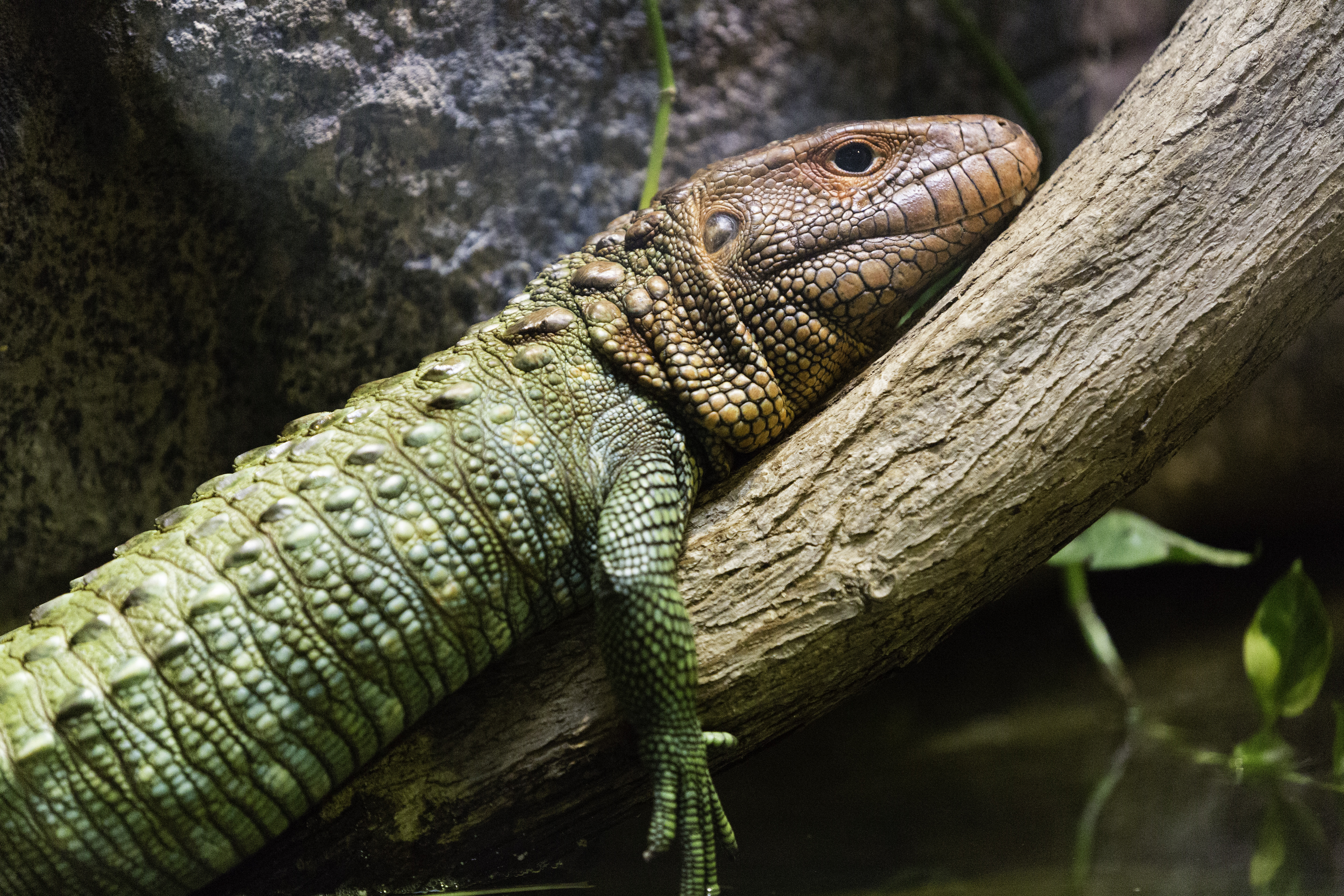
- At the St. Louis Zoo

Conservation status
- Least Concern (IUCN 3.1)
- CITES Appendix II

Scientific classification
- Kingdom: Animalia
- Phylum: Chordata
- Class: Reptilia
- Order: Squamata
- Family: Teiidae
- Genus: Dracaena
- Species: D. guianensis

Binomial name
- Dracaena guianensis Daudin, 1802

= Northern caiman lizard =

Species of lizard

The northern caiman lizard (Dracaena guianensis) is a species of lizard found in northern South America.

== Appearance ==
The northern caiman lizard is built similarly to its cousin the tegu, with a large heavy set body and short but powerful limbs. Its head is bulky and often a red or orange color. Their jaws are heavily muscular to help aid in eating its normal prey of snails, crawfish and fresh water clams. It also has a few adaptations that help it in its watery habitat. It has a long and flattened tail, similar to its namesake, the caiman. The long tail helps the northern caiman lizard to successfully swim and dive. A clear third eyelid is thought to act like a pair of goggles underwater.

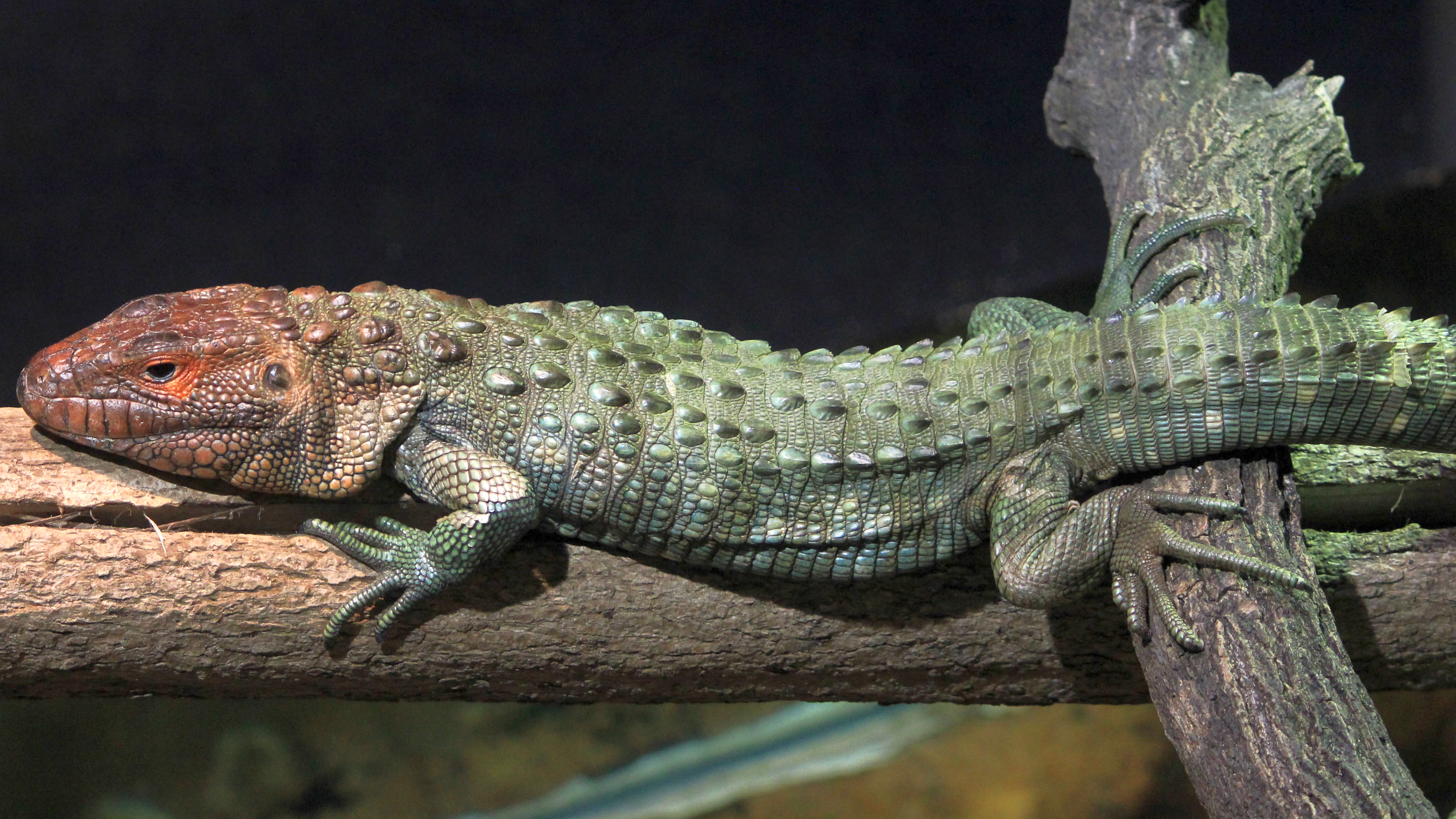
Northern caiman lizard

The body of the northern caiman lizard is very similar to that of a crocodile. It is typically a bright green with slight dark green banding. There are horned raised scales along the dorsal of the back. This helps to provide some protection against predators.

These lizards can reach up to 4 ft (1.2 m) long and weigh up to 10 lb (4.5 kg).

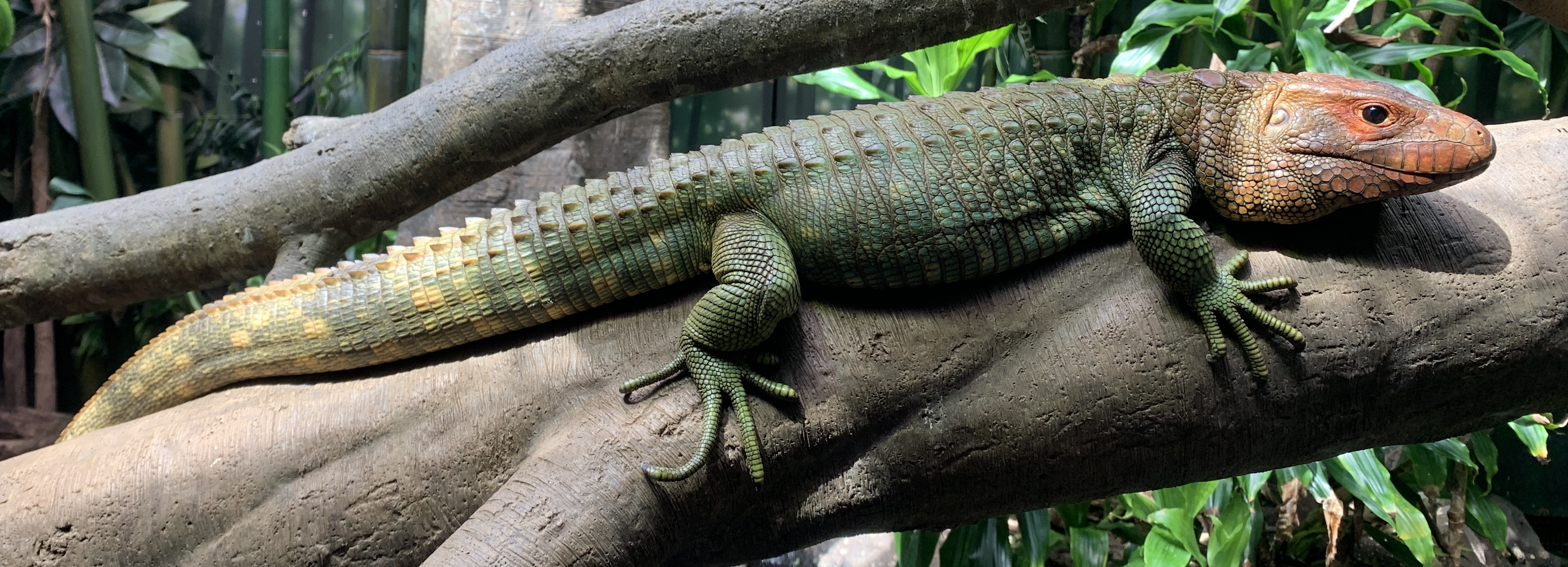
Bronx Zoo

== Distribution and habitat ==
D. guianensis can be found in the south American countries of Brazil, Colombia, Ecuador, Peru, and the Guianas. It lives in swampy habitats and other wooded areas which are flooded. It is mostly aquatic and is an excellent climber. It spends most of its time basking on branches overhanging waterways such that it may be able to flee from predation by disappearing underwater.

The lizard's wild population number is unknown. There has yet to be a study on them in their natural habitat. Much of what we know about them comes from captive animals in zoos and aquariums, as well as in the homes of hobbyists.

This species was heavily hunted for their hides. In 1970 they were provided protection and the export of their skin dropped. Now local populations are safe where their habitat is protected. Captive farms have since been set up to provide animals for the leather trade. In recent years a number of these animals have found themselves in the pet trade.

== Habits ==
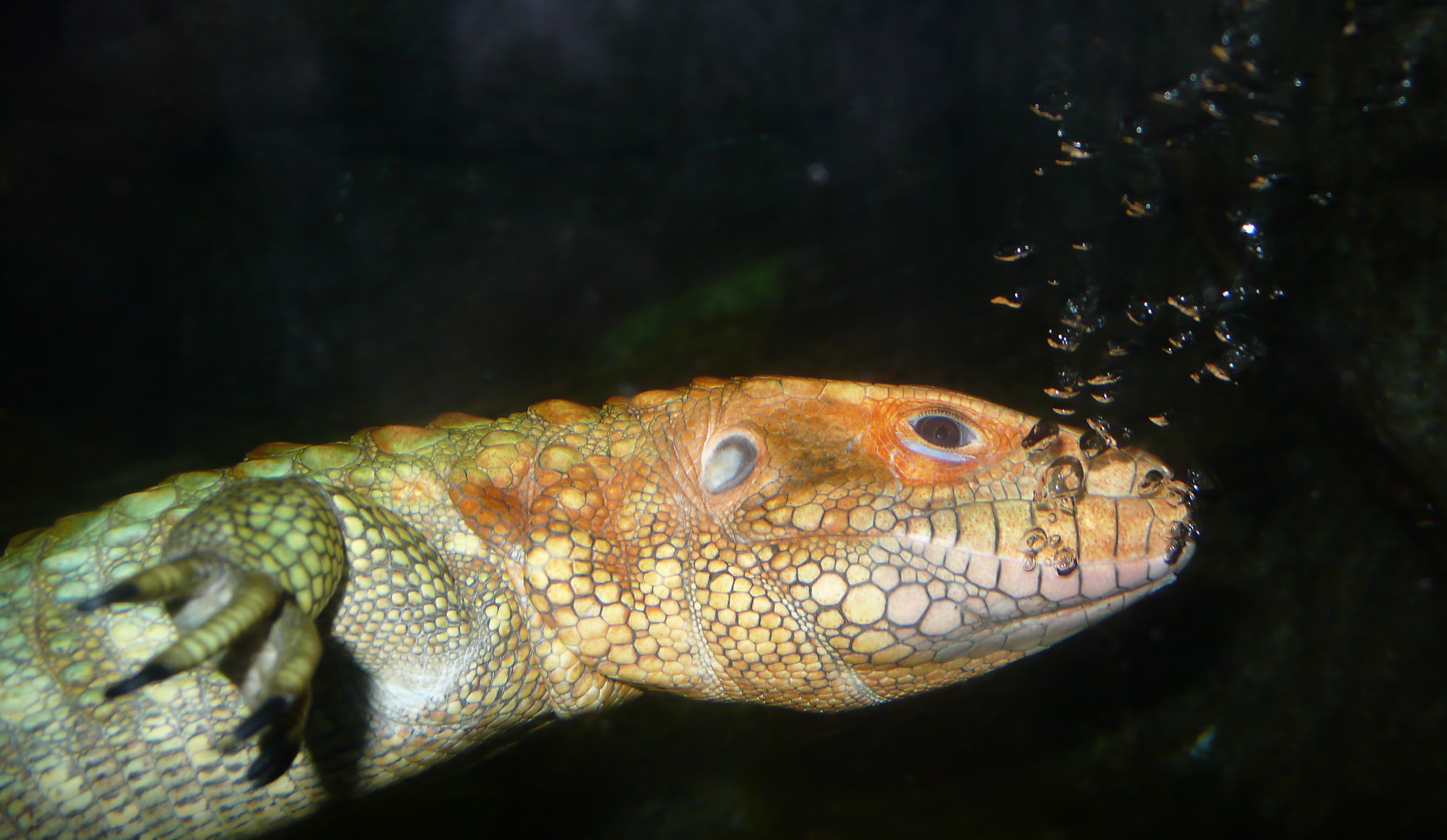
Underwater

The northern caiman lizard spends most of its time in or near water. At night, it hides in trees and bushes. Caiman lizards in the wild will take a variety of prey: snails, fish, amphibians, crabs, crawfish, clams, invertebrates, eggs and other freshwater inhabitants all can make up a caiman lizards diet. However they do specialize in snails. It takes the snail in the jaws, raises its head up so that the prey will slide into the back of the mouth, then crushes it with its back teeth. It then spits out the pieces of shell. The lizard has been known to even kill and eat Amazon river turtles by crushing the shell by the edges and eating the softer parts chunk after chunk. It will occasionally hunt rodents. It has also been known to burrow like its cousin the tegu.

== In captivity ==
Northern caiman lizard swimming in captivity

The northern caiman lizard has been hard to keep in captivity. Due to their natural diet consisting almost purely of snails, most wild caught adults will refuse to eat anything else. Some zoos and aquariums have had success in keeping and breeding them.

In the last five years, farmed baby northern caiman lizards from South America have made their way into the pet trade around the world. These hatchlings are more willing to accept other food sources. Even so, many owners find it highly useful to have a local source of escargot or even a variety of snails, with some reporting to have luck at Asian supermarkets.

The caiman lizard is not a reptile which, by any means, is easy to keep or raise in captivity; despite any docility, they still have strong jaws that are capable of delivering painful bites. Their aquatic lifestyle means that they need a large, filtered pool within their enclosure, as well as adequate places to dig and burrow. They also require logs, rocks or other suitable material with smooth surfaces to bask on. They require a high basking temperature at one end of the enclosure, with the other being a cooler side. Most lizards are provided, usually, with two lightbulbs—one for UVB rays, necessary for adequate vitamin D metabolization, and the other for ambient heat. Since many reptiles are prone to metabolic bone disease (MBD), proper calcium in their diets is essential along with the UVB exposure. Natural light is also acceptable, if an enclosure can be provided outdoors or near a bright window. The best setup for the caiman lizard is something akin to a large paludarium or riparium enclosure, with adequate land and water space. Beyond the fact that these lizards can grow to be fairly large—up to 4 feet in length—a large enclosure is mandatory to successfully keep them alive.

That being said, some owners claim there is a reward to keeping them; caiman lizards are intelligent, as can be observed in the way in which they approach a snail clinging to rocks, for example. They can solve problems which many other lizards apparently fail to, and can generally recognize their owners, given they have been socialised for the right amount of time and are cared for under excellent conditions.

Captive diet includes turkey meat (often mixed with Mazuri alligator diet), mussels, clam meat, catfood, fish and some fruits.

The zoo in Basel, Switzerland, is reported to have successfully bred northern caiman lizards in early 2023.
