= Rainbow ameiva =

A number of species of lizard are named rainbow ameiva, including:

- Holcosus amphigrammus
- Holcosus gaigeae
- Holcosus hartwegi
- Holcosus parvus
- Holcosus sinister
- Holcosus stuarti
- Holcosus thomasi
- Holcosus undulatus
