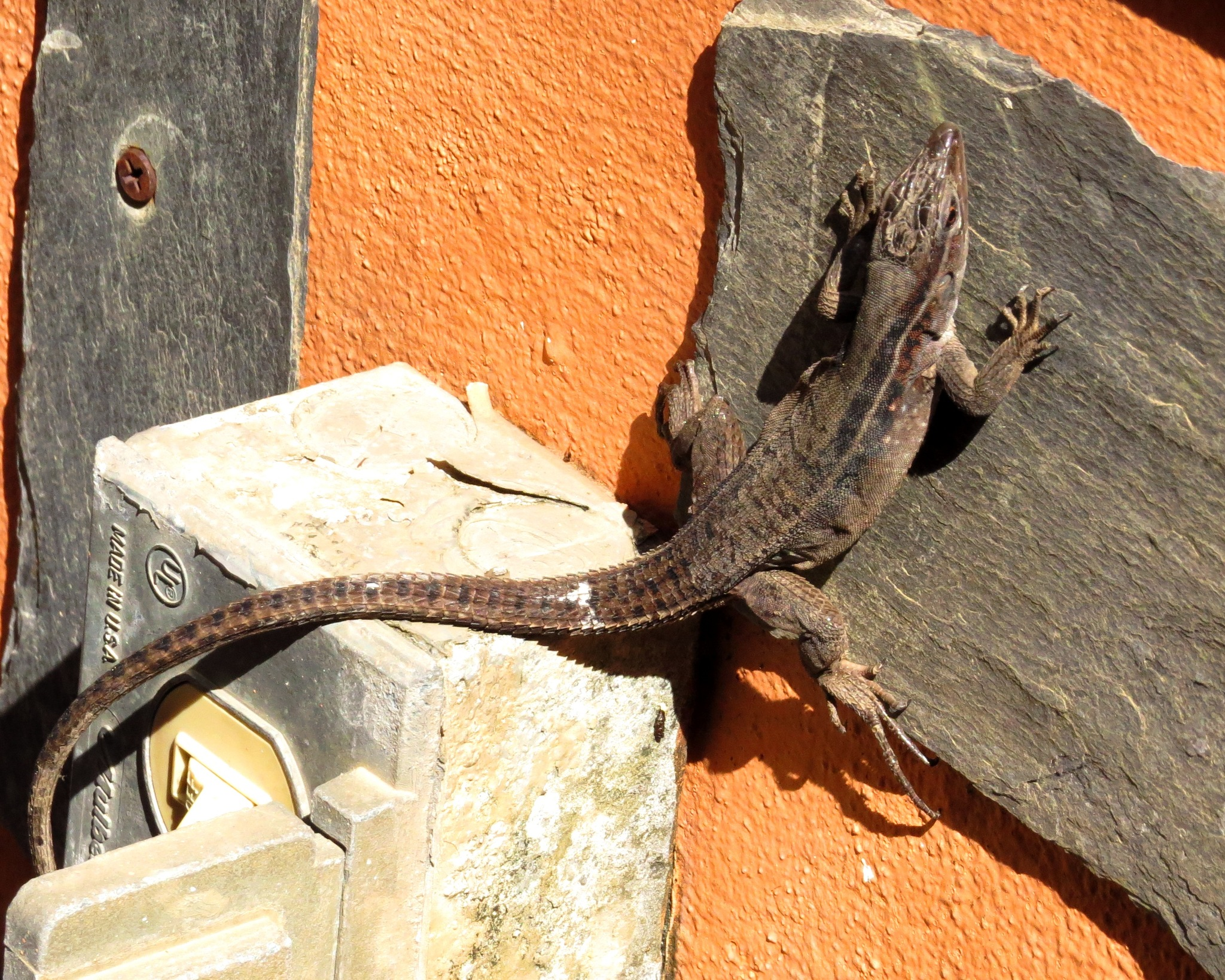

Conservation status
- Least Concern (IUCN 3.1)

Scientific classification
- Kingdom: Animalia
- Phylum: Chordata
- Class: Reptilia
- Order: Squamata
- Family: Teiidae
- Genus: Kentropyx
- Species: K. borckiana

Binomial name
- Kentropyx borckiana (W. Peters, 1869)

Synonyms
- Centropyx borckiana W. Peters, 1869; Centropyx copii Garman, 1887; Gastropholis mertensi de Grijs, 1926; Kentropyx copei — Grant, 1959; Kentropyx borckianus — Hoogmoed, 1973; Kentropyx borckiana — Schwartz & Henderson, 1991

= Kentropyx borckiana =

Species of lizard

Kentropyx borckiana, commonly known as the Guyana kentropyx, is a species of lizard in the family Teiidae. The species is endemic to northeastern South America, as well as to the Caribbean island of Barbados.

== Taxonomy ==
The specific name, borckiana, is in honor of Johann Graf von Borcke (1781–1862), a major in the Prussian Army who fought in the Napoleonic Wars. Borcke presented a number of specimens to the Berlin Museum. A population of lizards on Trinidad was originally thought to be K. borckiana, but has since been identified as Kentropyx striata.

== Distribution ==
Kentropyx borckiana is found in Guyana, French Guiana, Suriname, and on Barbados; its native status in the latter is unknown.

== Description ==
Kentropyx borckiana grows up to 100 mm (3.9 in) snout-to-vent. Its head and neck are greenish, with white underneath. Its sides are brown, and its underbody is pinkish. Its dorsal surface is gray to pinkish-brown, with light lateral stripes bordered with dark bands.

== Parthenogenesis ==
K. borckiana is apparently a rare unisexual clone that reproduces through parthenogenesis, in that only 100 female museum specimens are known to exist and no male specimens. It is believed to have arisen from hybridization between Kentropyx calcarata and Kentropyx striata.
