= Aurivela longicauda =

Scientific classification
- Domain: Eukaryota
- Kingdom: Animalia
- Phylum: Chordata
- Class: Reptilia
- Order: Squamata
- Family: Teiidae
- Genus: Aurivela
- Species: A. longicauda

Binomial name
- Aurivela longicauda (Bell, 1843)

Species of lizard

Aurivela longicauda, the longtail whiptail, is a species of teiid lizard endemic to Argentina.
