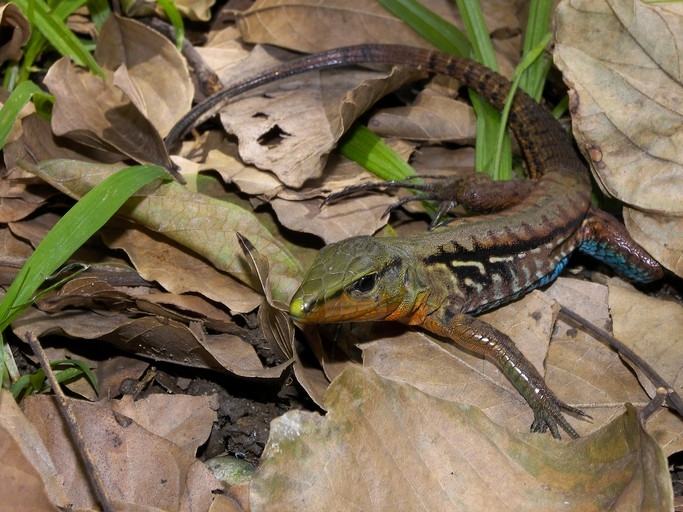

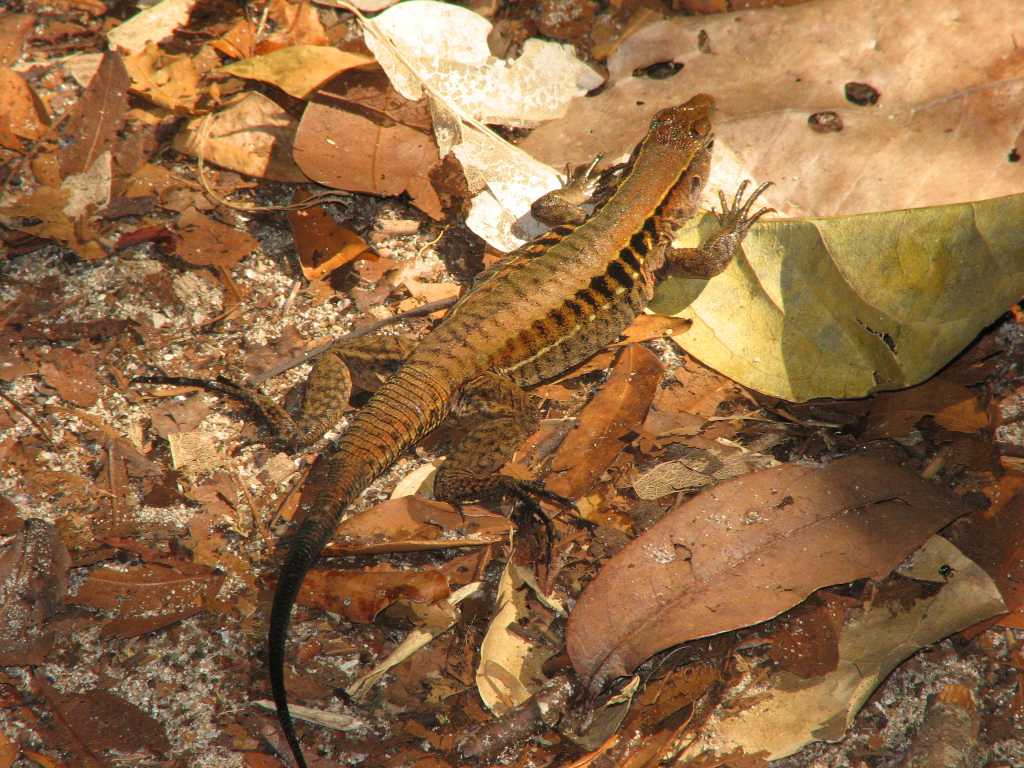

Conservation status
- Least Concern (IUCN 3.1)

Scientific classification
- Kingdom: Animalia
- Phylum: Chordata
- Class: Reptilia
- Order: Squamata
- Family: Teiidae
- Genus: Holcosus
- Species: H. festivus

Binomial name
- Holcosus festivus (Lichtenstein, 1856)

Synonyms
- Cnemidophorus festivus Lichtenstein, 1856; Ameiva festivus — Bocourt, 1874; Ameiva festiva — Boulenger, 1885; Holcosus festivus — Harvey et al., 2012

= Holcosus festivus =

Species of lizard

Holcosus festivus, commonly known as the Central American whiptail, the Middle American ameiva, and the tiger ameiva, is a species of lizard in the family Teiidae. The species is native to Central America and northern South America.

== Geographic range ==
H. festivus is found from southern Mexico to Colombia.

== Description ==
H. festivus is brown-colored, with darker browns making a zig-zag pattern down the back. A similar species is Holcosus quadrilineatus. Juveniles have metallic-blue tails.

== Habitat ==
H. festivus lives in open habitats.

== Subspecies ==
Three subspecies are recognized, including the nominotypical subspecies.

- H. f. festivus (Lichtenstein, 1856) – northern Colombia and Panama
- H. f. edwardsii Bocourt, 1873 – Guatemala, Honduras, southern Mexico, and Nicaragua
- H. f. occidentalis Taylor, 1956 – Costa Rica

Nota bene: A taxon author (binomial authority or trinomial authority) in parentheses indicates that the taxon (species or subspecies) was originally described in a different genus (in this case, a genus other than Holcosus).

== Etymology ==
The subspecific name, edwardsii, is in honor of French zoologist Alphonse Milne-Edwards.
