= Glaucomastix abaetensis =

Scientific classification
- Domain: Eukaryota
- Kingdom: Animalia
- Phylum: Chordata
- Class: Reptilia
- Order: Squamata
- Family: Teiidae
- Genus: Glaucomastix
- Species: G. abaetensis

Binomial name
- Glaucomastix abaetensis (Reis Dias, Rocha, & Vrcibradic, 2002)

Synonyms
- Cnemidophorus abaetensis Ameivula abaetensis

Species of lizard

Glaucomastix abaetensis, the Bahian sand dune lizard, is a species of teiid lizard endemic to Brazil.
