= Kentropyx vanzoi =

Conservation status
- Near Threatened (IUCN 3.1)

Scientific classification
- Kingdom: Animalia
- Phylum: Chordata
- Class: Reptilia
- Order: Squamata
- Family: Teiidae
- Genus: Kentropyx
- Species: K. vanzoi

Binomial name
- Kentropyx vanzoi Gallagher & Dixon, 1980

Species of lizard

Kentropyx vanzoi, also known commonly as Gallagher's kentropyx and o calanguinho-listrado in Brazilian Portuguese, is a species of lizard in the family Teiidae. The species is native to central South America.

== Etymology ==
The specific name, vanzoi, is in honor of Brazilian herpetologist Paulo Vanzolini.

== Geographic range ==
K. vanzoi is found in Bolivia (Santa Cruz Department) and Brazil (Mato Grosso state).

== Habitat ==
The preferred natural habitat of K. vanzoi is savanna, at altitudes below 650 m (2,130 ft).

== Description ==
K. vanzoi may attain a snout-to-vent length (SVL) of 6.5 cm (2.6 in). Males are greener than females, an example of sexual dimorphism.

== Diet ==
K. vanzoi preys upon arthropods, predominately orthopterans, spiders, and termites.

== Reproduction ==
K. vanzoi is oviparous. Average clutch size is three eggs.
