= Ameivula apipensis =

Scientific classification
- Kingdom: Animalia
- Phylum: Chordata
- Class: Reptilia
- Order: Squamata
- Family: Teiidae
- Genus: Ameivula
- Species: A. apipensis

Binomial name
- Ameivula apipensis Arias, Recoder, Álvarez, Ethcepare, Quipildor, Lobo, & Rodrigues, 2018

Species of lizard

Ameivula apipensis is a species of teiid lizard endemic to Argentina.
