= Glaucomastix venetacauda =

Conservation status
- Least Concern (IUCN 3.1)

Scientific classification
- Kingdom: Animalia
- Phylum: Chordata
- Class: Reptilia
- Order: Squamata
- Family: Teiidae
- Genus: Glaucomastix
- Species: G. venetacauda

Binomial name
- Glaucomastix venetacauda (Arias, De Carvalho, Rodrigues, & Zaher, 2011)

Species of lizard

Glaucomastix venetacauda is a species of teiid lizard endemic to Brazil.
