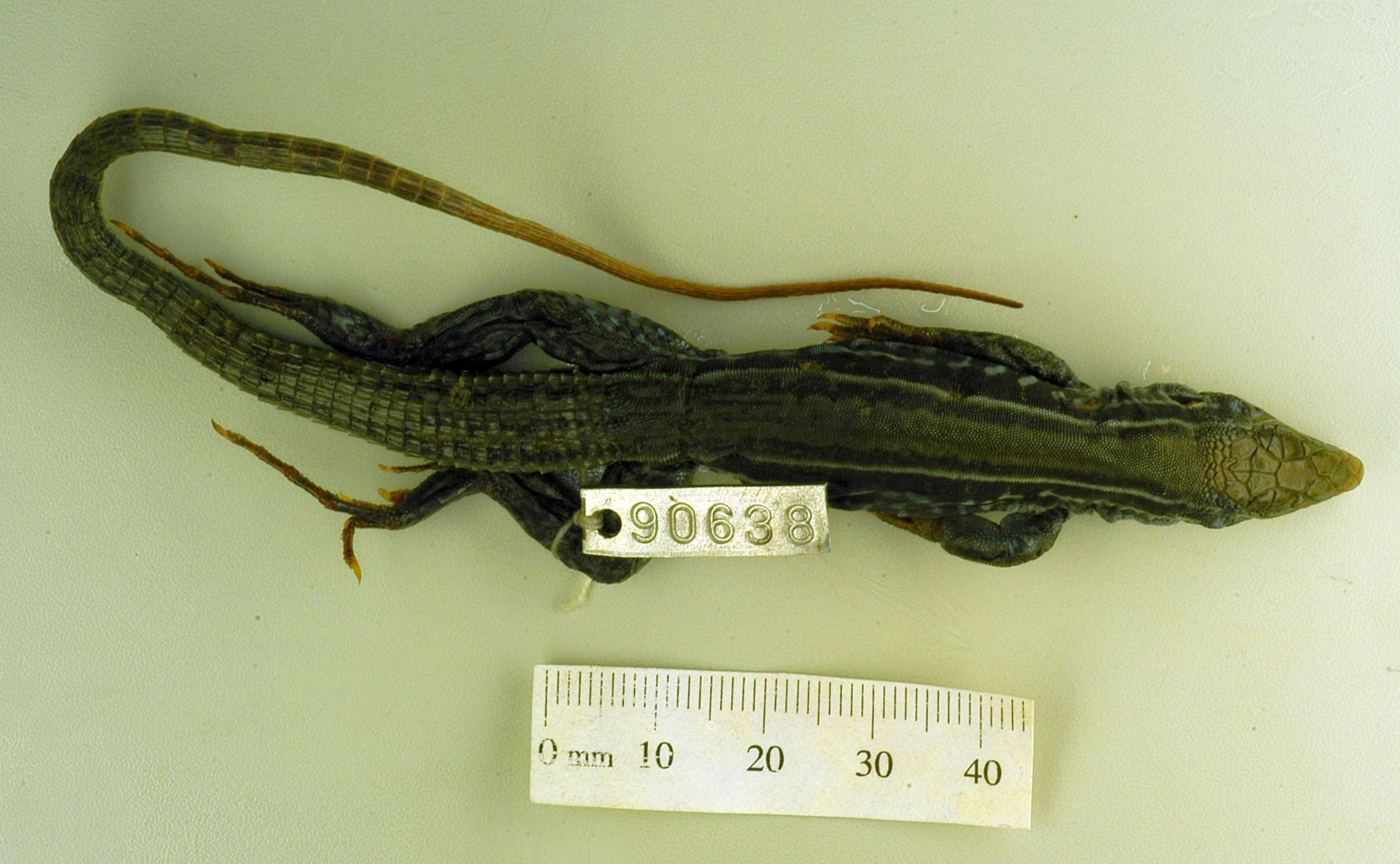

Conservation status
- Data Deficient (IUCN 3.1)

Scientific classification
- Kingdom: Animalia
- Phylum: Chordata
- Class: Reptilia
- Order: Squamata
- Family: Teiidae
- Genus: Holcosus
- Species: H. chaitzami

Binomial name
- Holcosus chaitzami (Stuart, 1942)

Synonyms
- Ameiva chaitzami Stuart, 1942; Holcosus chaitzami — Harvey, Ugueto & Gutberlet, 2012

= Holcosus chaitzami =

Species of lizard

Holcosus chaitzami, also known commonly as Chaitzam's ameiva, is a species of lizard in the family Teiidae. The species is native to extreme southern North America and Central America.

== Etymology ==
The specific name, chaitzami, is "dedicated to Chaitzam, the mountain lord who dominates the lower Cahabón Valley".

== Geographic range ==
H. chaitzami is found in Guatemala and in the southernmost Mexican state of Chiapas.

== Habitat ==
The preferred natural habitat of H. chaitzami is forest, at altitudes of 400–700 m (1,300–2,300 ft).

== Description ==
A small species for its genus, H. chaitzami may attain a snout-to-vent length (SVL) of about 8 cm (3.1 in).

== Reproduction ==
H. chaitzami is oviparous.
