= Kentropyx paulensis =

Conservation status
- Least Concern (IUCN 3.1)

Scientific classification
- Kingdom: Animalia
- Phylum: Chordata
- Class: Reptilia
- Order: Squamata
- Family: Teiidae
- Genus: Kentropyx
- Species: K. paulensis

Binomial name
- Kentropyx paulensis (Boettger, 1893)

Synonyms
- Centropyx paulensis Boetttger, 1893; Kentropyx paulensis — J. Peters & Donoso-Barros, 1970

Species of lizard

Kentropyx paulensis, also known commonly as Boettger's kentropyx and calango or calanguinho in Brazilian Portuguese, is a species of lizard in the family Teiidae. The species is endemic to Brazil.

== Etymology ==
The specific name, paulensis, refers to the city of São Paulo, which is the type locality.

== Geographic range ==
K. paulensis is found in southern Brazil, in the states of Bahia, Goiás, Minas Gerais, Mato Grosso, Mato Grosso do Sul, São Paulo, Tocantins, and in the Distrito Federal.

== Habitat ==
The preferred natural habitat of K. paulensis is savanna.

== Description ==
K. paulensis may attain a snout-to-vent length (SVL) of 7.7 cm (3.0 in).

== Reproduction ==
K. paulensis is oviparous. Average clutch size is four eggs.
