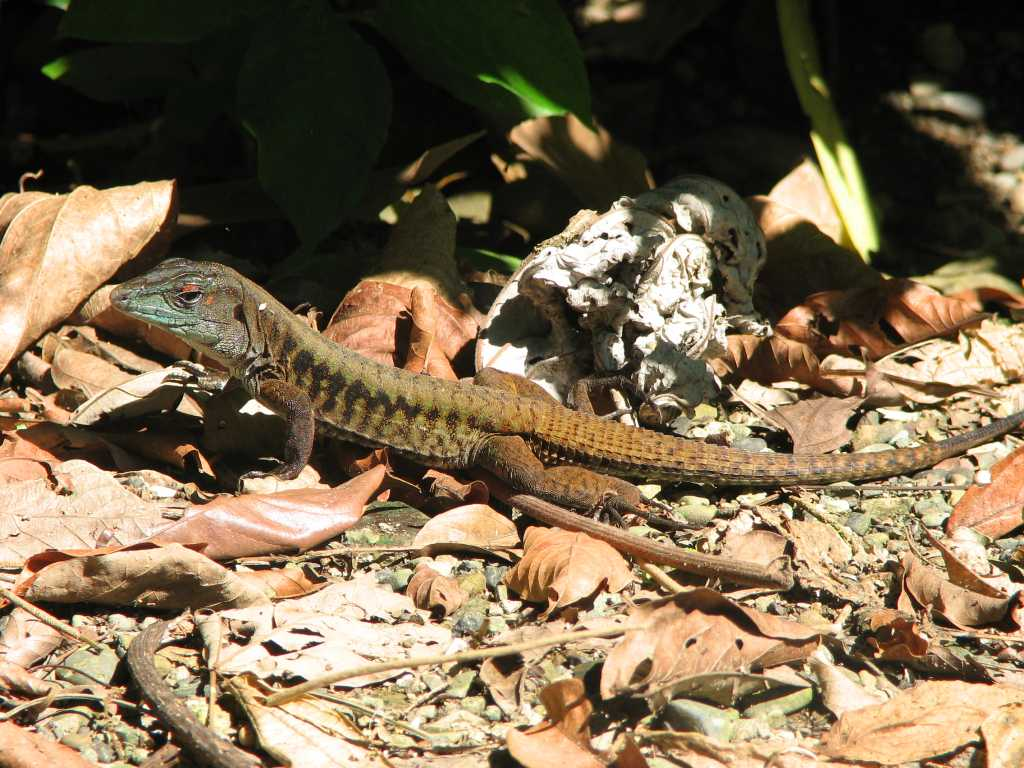
- in Manuel Antonio National Park, Costa Rica

Conservation status
- Least Concern (IUCN 3.1)

Scientific classification
- Kingdom: Animalia
- Phylum: Chordata
- Class: Reptilia
- Order: Squamata
- Family: Teiidae
- Genus: Holcosus
- Species: H. leptophrys

Binomial name
- Holcosus leptophrys (Cope, 1893)

Synonyms
- Ameiva leptophrys Cope, 1893; Holcosus leptophrys – Harvey, Ugueto & Gutberlet, 2012

= Holcosus leptophrys =

Species of lizard

Holcosus leptophrys, also known commonly as the delicate ameiva and the delicate whiptail, is a species of lizard in the family Teiidae. The species is native to Central America and northwestern South America.

== Geographic range ==
H. lepyophrys is found in Colombia, Costa Rica, and Panama.

== Description ==
H. leptophrys is brown-coloured, with bark-brown zig-zag lines running down each side.
