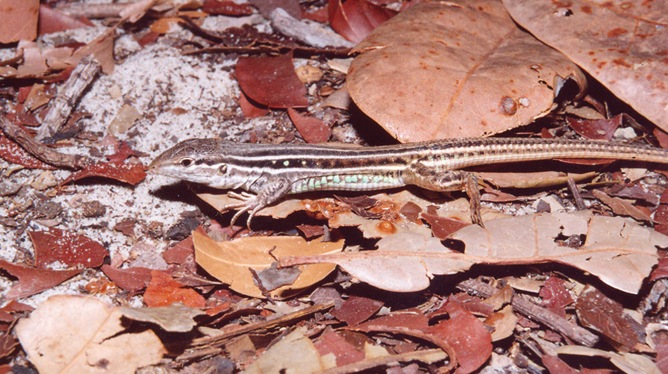

Scientific classification
- Domain: Eukaryota
- Kingdom: Animalia
- Phylum: Chordata
- Class: Reptilia
- Order: Squamata
- Family: Teiidae
- Genus: Ameivula
- Species: A. ocellifera

Binomial name
- Ameivula ocellifera (Spix, 1825)

= Ameivula ocellifera =

Species of lizard

Ameivula ocellifera, Spix's whiptail, is a species of teiid lizard found in Brazil and Argentina.
