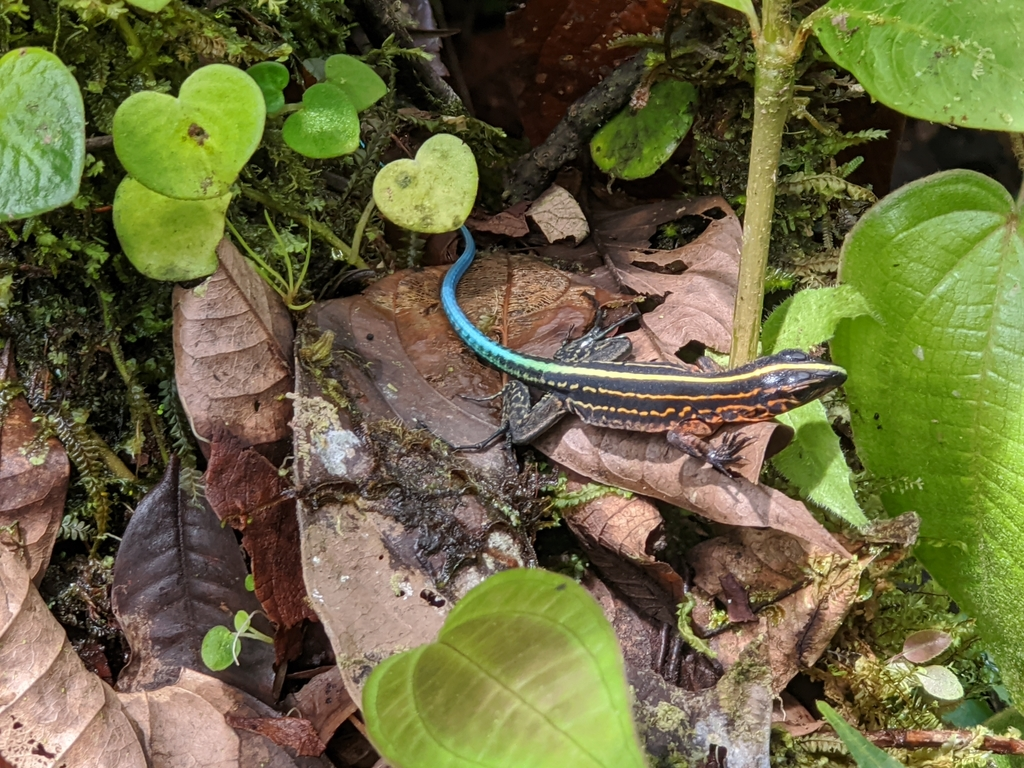

Conservation status
- Least Concern (IUCN 3.1)

Scientific classification
- Kingdom: Animalia
- Phylum: Chordata
- Class: Reptilia
- Order: Squamata
- Family: Teiidae
- Genus: Holcosus
- Species: H. bridgesii

Binomial name
- Holcosus bridgesii Cope, 1869

Synonyms
- Holcosus bridgesii Cope, 1869; Ameiva bridgesii — Boulenger, 1885; Holcosus bridgesii — Harvey et al., 2012

= Holcosus bridgesii =

Species of lizard

Holcosus bridgesii, also known commonly as Bridges's ameiva , is a species of lizard in the family Teiidae. The species is native to northwestern South America.

== Etymology ==
The specific name, bridgesii, is in honor of American chemistry professor Robert Bridges (1806–1882).

== Geographic range ==
H. bridgesii is found in southern Colombia (Nariño Department and Gorgona Island) and northwestern Ecuador (Carchi Province and Esmeraldas Province).

== Habitat ==
The preferred natural habitat of H. bridgesii is forest, at altitudes from sea level to 1,200 m (3,900 ft).

== Description ==
H. bridgesii may attain a snout-to-vent length of 12 cm (4.7 in), and a total length (including tail) of 44 cm (17 in).

== Reproduction ==
H. bridgesii is oviparous.
