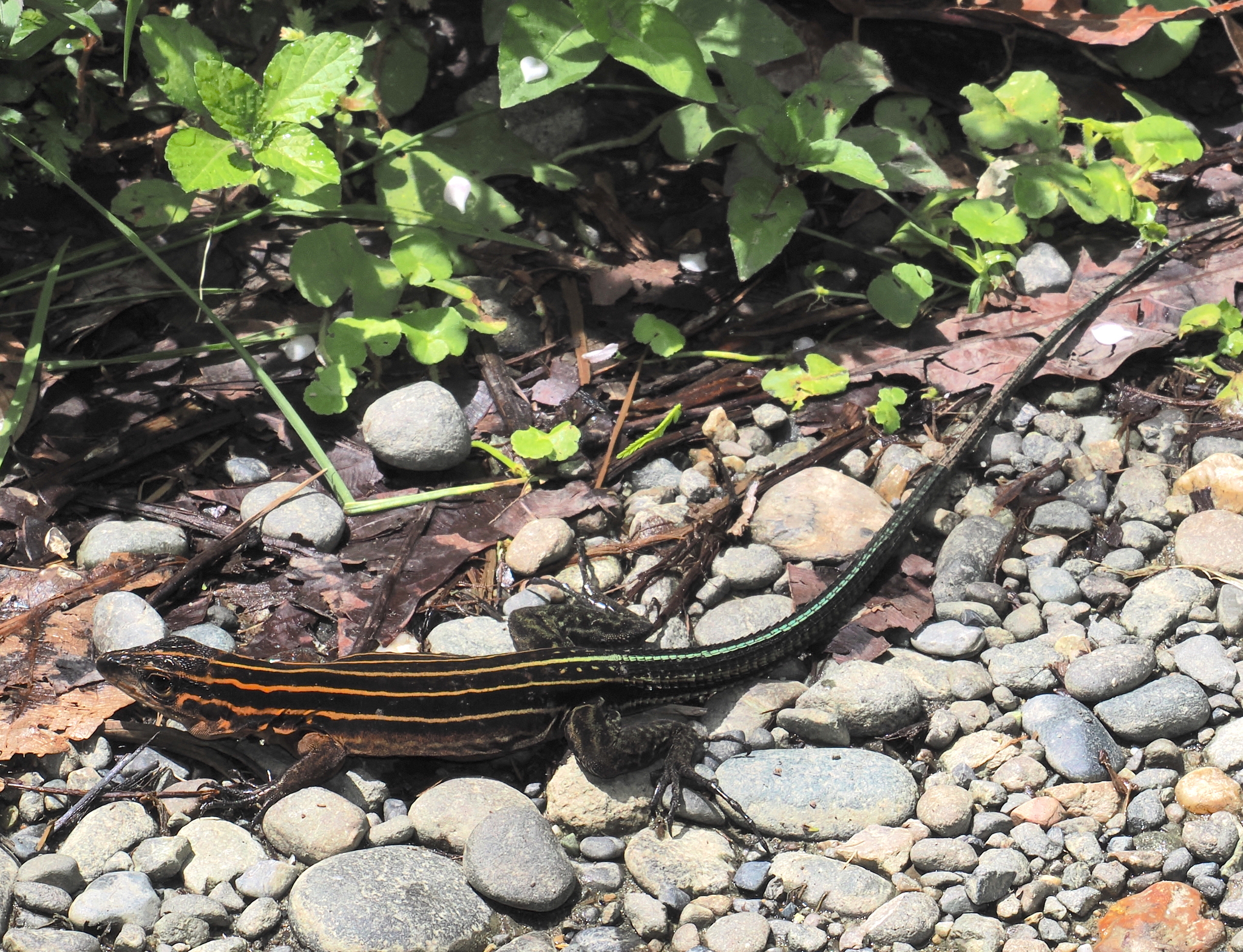

Conservation status
- Least Concern (IUCN 3.1)

Scientific classification
- Kingdom: Animalia
- Phylum: Chordata
- Class: Reptilia
- Order: Squamata
- Family: Teiidae
- Genus: Holcosus
- Species: H. anomalus

Binomial name
- Holcosus anomalus (Echternacht, 1977)

Synonyms
- Ameiva anomala Echternacht, 1977; Holcosus anomalus — Harvey, Ugueto & Gutberlet, 2012

= Holcosus anomalus =

Species of lizard

Holcosus anomalus, also known commonly as Echternacht's ameiva, is a species of lizard in the family Teiidae. The species is endemic to Colombia.

== Geographic range ==
H. anomalus is found in the Pacific lowlands of Colombia.

== Habitat ==
The preferred natural habitat of H. anomalus is forest, at altitudes from sea level to 500 m (1,600 ft).

== Description ==
Moderately large for its genus, H. anomalus may attain a snout-to-vent length (SVL) of 11 cm (4.3 in). The ventral scales on the chest are granular, a character which is unique in its genus and in its subfamily (Teiinae).

== Behavior ==
H. anomalus is terrestrial.

== Reproduction ==
H. anomalus is oviparous.
