= Glaucomastix cyanura =

Scientific classification
- Kingdom: Animalia
- Phylum: Chordata
- Class: Reptilia
- Order: Squamata
- Family: Teiidae
- Genus: Glaucomastix
- Species: G. cyanura

Binomial name
- Glaucomastix cyanura (Arias, De Carvalho, Rodrigues, & Zaher, 2011)

Species of lizard

Glaucomastix cyanura is a species of teiid lizard endemic to Brazil.
