= Kentropyx viridistriga =

Conservation status
- Least Concern (IUCN 3.1)

Scientific classification
- Kingdom: Animalia
- Phylum: Chordata
- Class: Reptilia
- Order: Squamata
- Suborder: Lacertoidea
- Family: Teiidae
- Genus: Kentropyx
- Species: K. viridistriga

Binomial name
- Kentropyx viridistriga (Boulenger, 1894)

Species of lizard

Kentropyx viridistriga, the green kentropyx, is a species of teiid lizard found in Argentina, Brazil, and Bolivia.
