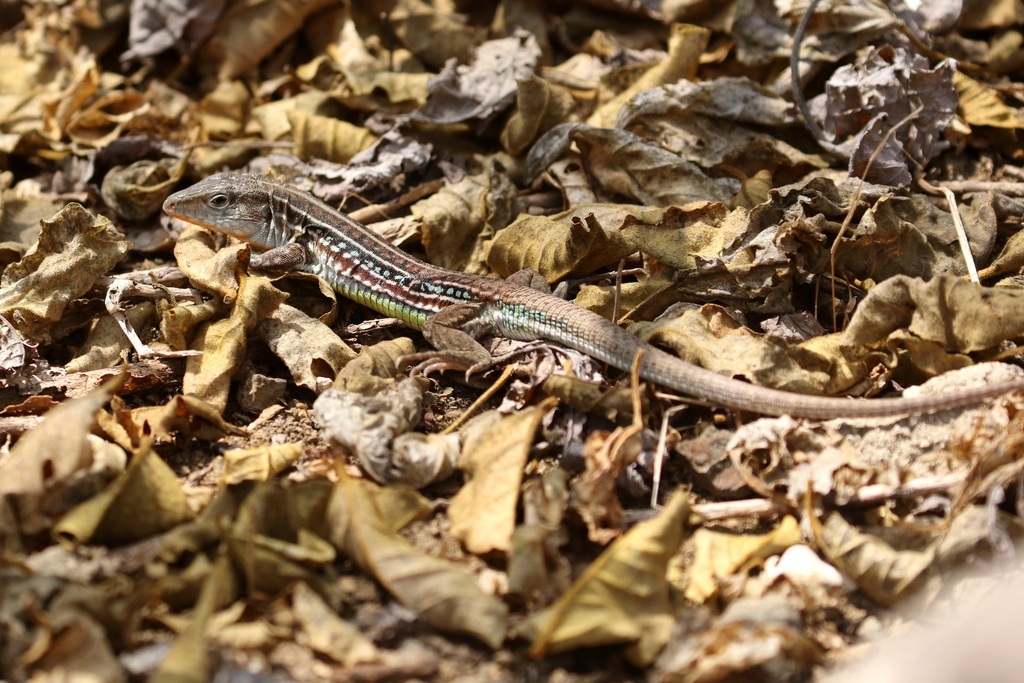

Conservation status
- Least Concern (IUCN 3.1)

Scientific classification
- Kingdom: Animalia
- Phylum: Chordata
- Class: Reptilia
- Order: Squamata
- Family: Teiidae
- Genus: Holcosus
- Species: H. septemlineatus

Binomial name
- Holcosus septemlineatus (A.H.A. Duméril, 1851)

Synonyms
- Ameiva septemlineata A.H.A. Duméril, 1851; Ameiva sex-scutata Günther, 1859; Holcosus septemlineatus — Cope, 1862; Holcosus sexscutatus — Cope, 1862; Ameiva septemlineata — Boulenger, 1885; Holcosus septemlineatus — Harvey et al., 2012

= Holcosus septemlineatus =

Species of lizard

Holcosus septemlineatus, also known commonly as the seven-lined ameiva or the lagartija terrestre de cola azul (Spanish), is a species of lizard in the family Teiidae. The species is native to northwestern South America.

== Geographic range ==
H. septemlineatus is found in the western lowlands of Ecuador and Colombia. In Ecuador, H. septemlineatus inhabits areas which the World Wide Fund for Nature classifies as the bioregions of Ecuadorian dry forests, Western Ecuador moist forests, Northwestern Andean montane forests, Guayaquil flooded grasslands, South American Pacific mangroves, and Manabí mangroves.
