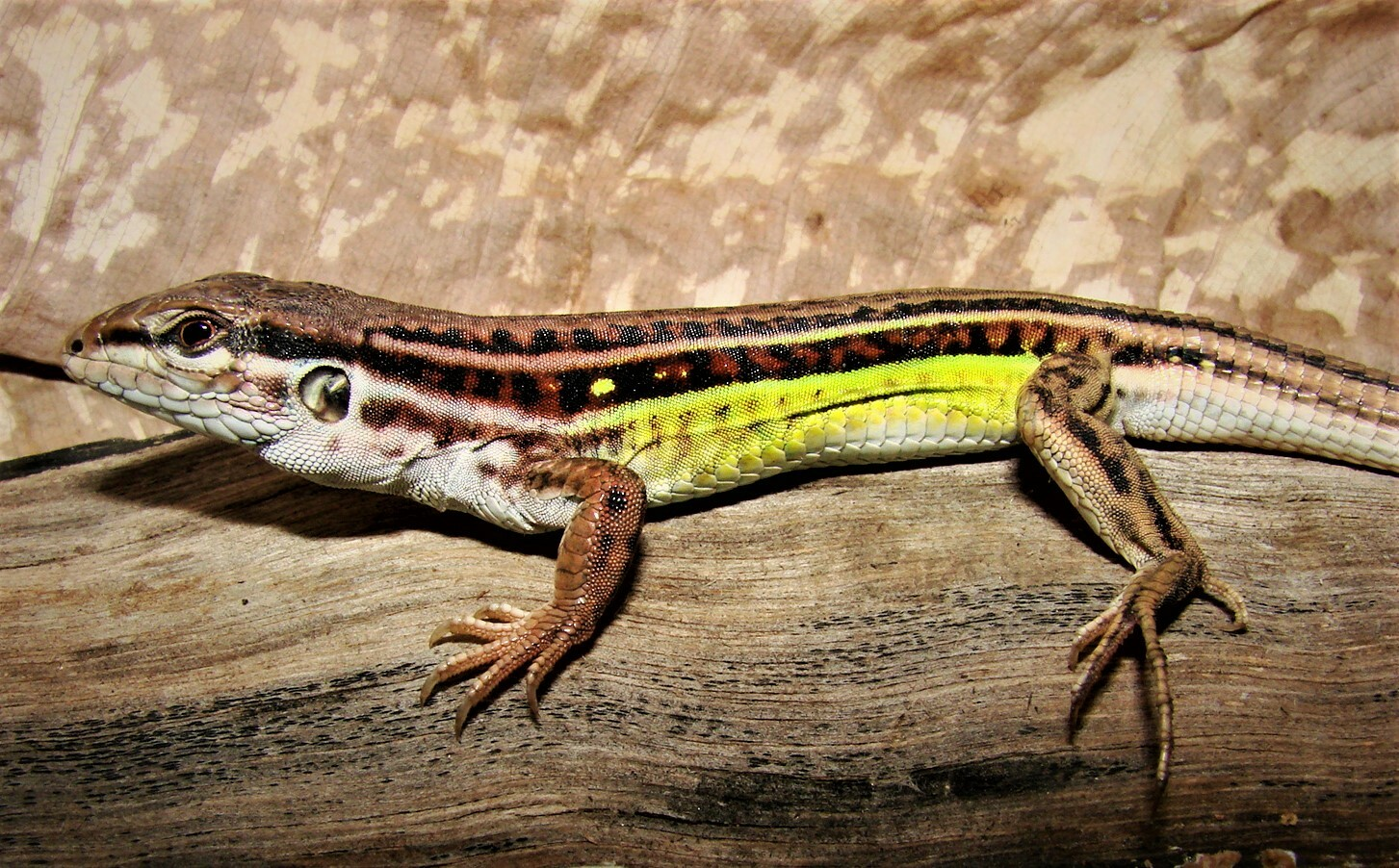

Scientific classification
- Kingdom: Animalia
- Phylum: Chordata
- Class: Reptilia
- Order: Squamata
- Family: Teiidae
- Genus: Ameivula
- Species: A. xacriaba

Binomial name
- Ameivula xacriaba Arias, Texeira Jr., Recoder, de Carvalho, Zaher, & Rodrigues, 2014

= Ameivula xacriaba =

Species of lizard

Ameivula xacriaba is a species of teiid lizard endemic to Brazil.
