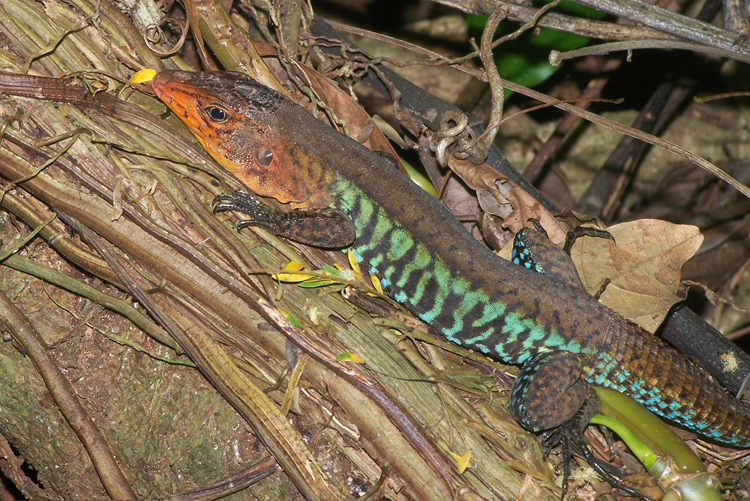
- Rainbow ameiva (Holcosus undulatus)

Scientific classification
- Kingdom: Animalia
- Phylum: Chordata
- Class: Reptilia
- Order: Squamata
- Family: Teiidae
- Subfamily: Teiinae
- Genus: Holcosus; Cope, 1862

Type species
- Holcosus septemlineatus

= Holcosus =

Genus of lizards

Holcosus is a genus of lizards in the family Teiidae.

== Geographic range ==
Species of the genus Holcosus are found in southern Mexico, Central America, and northern South America.

== Species ==
These 18 species are recognized as being valid. Binomial authority in parentheses indicates that the species was originally described in a genus other than Holcosus.

Image	Scientific name	Common name	Distribution
	Holcosus amphigrammus (H.M. Smith & Laufe, 1945)	rainbow ameiva	Mexico.
	Holcosus anomalus (Echternacht, 1977)	Echternacht's ameiva	Colombia.
	Holcosus bridgesii Cope, 1869	Bridges's ameiva	southern Colombia (Nariño Department and Gorgona Island) and northwestern Ecuador (Carchi Province and Esmeraldas Province).
	Holcosus chaitzami (Stuart, 1942)	Chaitzam's ameiva	Guatemala and in the southernmost Mexican state of Chiapas.
	Holcosus festivus (Lichtenstein, 1856)	Middle American ameiva	southern Mexico to Colombia
	Holcosus gaigeae (H.M. Smith & Laufe, 1946)	rainbow ameiva	Mexico.
	Holcosus hartwegi (H.M. Smith, 1940)	rainbow ameiva	Guatemala and Mexico.
	Holcosus leptophrys (Cope, 1893)	delicate ameiva, delicate whiptail	Colombia, Costa Rica, and Panama.
	Holcosus niceforoi (Dunn, 1943)		Colombia.
	Holcosus orcesi (J. Peters, 1964)	Peters's ameiva	Ecuador.
	Holcosus parvus (Barbour & Noble, 1915)	rainbow ameiva	Costa Rica and Mexico.
	Holcosus pulcher (Hallowell, 1861)		Costa Rica and Honduras.
	Holcosus quadrilineatus (Hallowell, 1861)	four-lined ameiva	western Panama, Costa Rica, and southeastern Nicaragua
	Holcosus septemlineatus (A.H.A. Duméril, 1851)	seven-lined ameiva	Colombia and Ecuador.
	Holcosus sinister (H.M. Smith & Laufe, 1946)	rainbow ameiva	Mexico
	Holcosus stuarti (H.M. Smith, 1940)	rainbow ameiva	Mexico.
	Holcosus thomasi (H.M. Smith & Laufe, 1946)	rainbow ameiva	Guatemala and Chiapas Mexico .
	Holcosus undulatus (Wiegmann, 1834)	rainbow ameiva	Mexico.
