= Ameivula abalosi =

Conservation status
- Least Concern (IUCN 3.1)

Scientific classification
- Kingdom: Animalia
- Phylum: Chordata
- Class: Reptilia
- Order: Squamata
- Family: Teiidae
- Genus: Ameivula
- Species: A. abalosi

Binomial name
- Ameivula abalosi (Cabrera, 2012)

Species of lizard

Ameivula abalosi is a species of teiid lizard found in Argentina and Paraguay.

The unique combination of characteristics, such as the presence of five superciliary scales, a low number of femoral pores, and the presence of erect thornlike scales along the lower half of the calf in males, distinguishes Ameivula abalosi from the other species in the Ameivula genus.
