= Ameivula pyrrhogularis =

Conservation status
- Least Concern (IUCN 3.1)

Scientific classification
- Kingdom: Animalia
- Phylum: Chordata
- Class: Reptilia
- Order: Squamata
- Family: Teiidae
- Genus: Ameivula
- Species: A. pyrrhogularis

Binomial name
- Ameivula pyrrhogularis (Basto da Silva & Ávila-Pires, 2013)

Species of lizard

Ameivula pyrrhogularis is a species of teiid lizard endemic to Brazil.
