= Ameivula jalapensis =

Conservation status
- Least Concern (IUCN 3.1)

Scientific classification
- Kingdom: Animalia
- Phylum: Chordata
- Class: Reptilia
- Order: Squamata
- Family: Teiidae
- Genus: Ameivula
- Species: A. jalapensis

Binomial name
- Ameivula jalapensis (Colli, Giugliano, Mesquita, & Franca, 2009)

Species of lizard

Ameivula jalapensis is a species of teiid lizard endemic to Brazil.
