= Ameivula mumbuca =

Conservation status
- Least Concern (IUCN 3.1)

Scientific classification
- Kingdom: Animalia
- Phylum: Chordata
- Class: Reptilia
- Order: Squamata
- Family: Teiidae
- Genus: Ameivula
- Species: A. mumbuca

Binomial name
- Ameivula mumbuca (Colli, Caldwell, Costa, Gainsbury, Garda, Mesquita, Filho, Soares, Silva, Valdujo, Vieira, Vitt, Werneck, Wiederhecker, & Zatz, 2003)

Species of lizard

Ameivula mumbuca is a species of teiid lizard endemic to Brazil.
