= Kentropyx lagartija =

Conservation status
- Least Concern (IUCN 3.1)

Scientific classification
- Kingdom: Animalia
- Phylum: Chordata
- Order: Squamata
- Family: Teiidae
- Genus: Kentropyx
- Species: K. lagartija

Binomial name
- Kentropyx lagartija Gallardo, 1962

Species of lizard

Kentropyx lagartija, also known commonly as the Tucuman whiptail, is a species of lizard in the family Teiidae. The species is endemic to Argentina.
