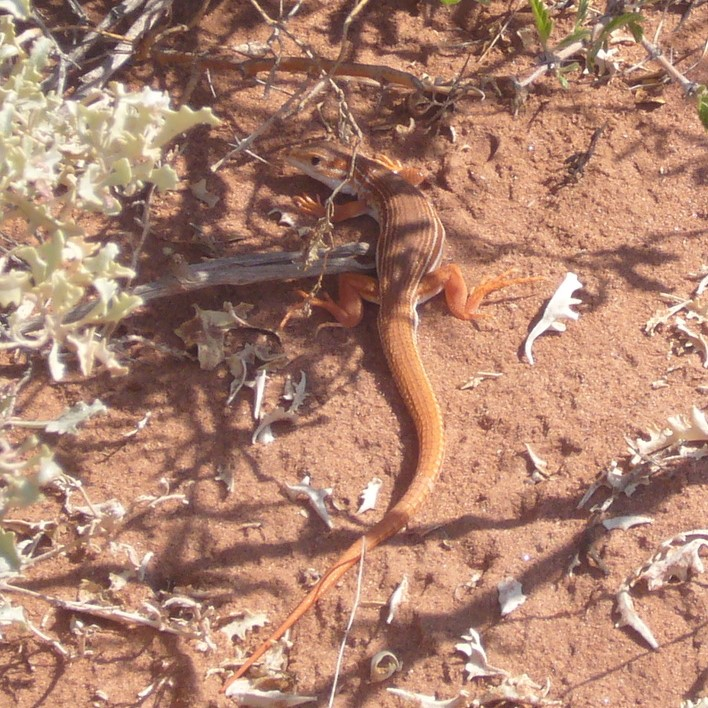

Scientific classification
- Domain: Eukaryota
- Kingdom: Animalia
- Phylum: Chordata
- Class: Reptilia
- Order: Squamata
- Family: Teiidae
- Genus: Aurivela
- Species: A. tergolaevigata

Binomial name
- Aurivela tergolaevigata (Cabrera, 2004)

= Aurivela tergolaevigata =

Species of lizard

Aurivela tergolaevigata is a species of teiid lizard endemic to Argentina.
