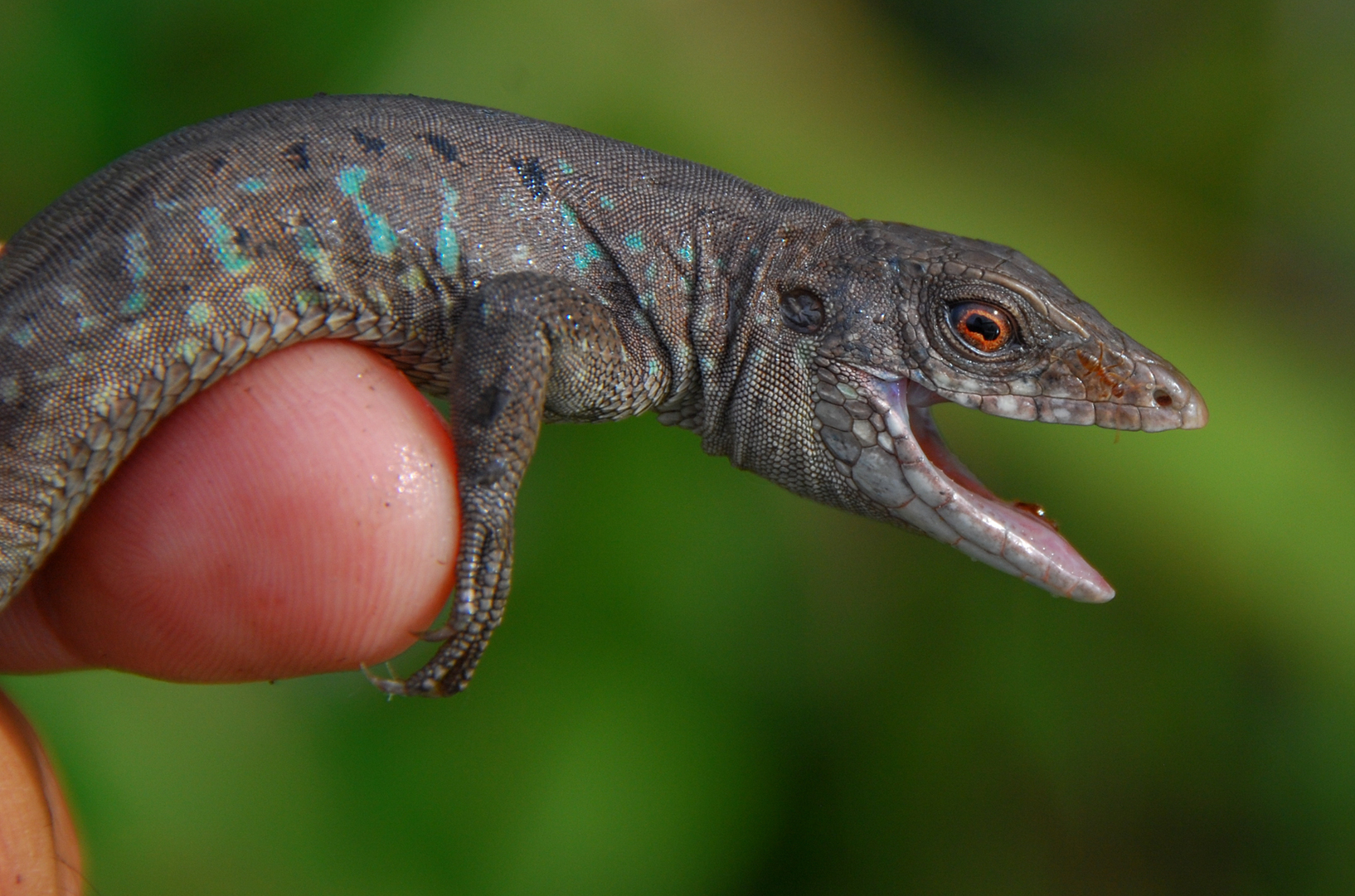
- Amazonas, Brazil

Conservation status
- Least Concern (IUCN 3.1)

Scientific classification
- Kingdom: Animalia
- Phylum: Chordata
- Class: Reptilia
- Order: Squamata
- Family: Teiidae
- Genus: Kentropyx
- Species: K. altamazonica

Binomial name
- Kentropyx altamazonica (Cope, 1875)

Synonyms
- Centropyx altamazonicus Cope, 1875; Kentropyx williamsoni Ruthven, 1929; Kentropyx altamazonicus — J. Peters & Donoso-Barros, 1970; Kentropyx altamazonica — Gallagher & Dixon, 1980

= Kentropyx altamazonica =

Species of lizard

Kentropyx altamazonica, also known commonly as the Cocha whiptail, is a species of lizard in the family Teiidae. The species is native to South America.

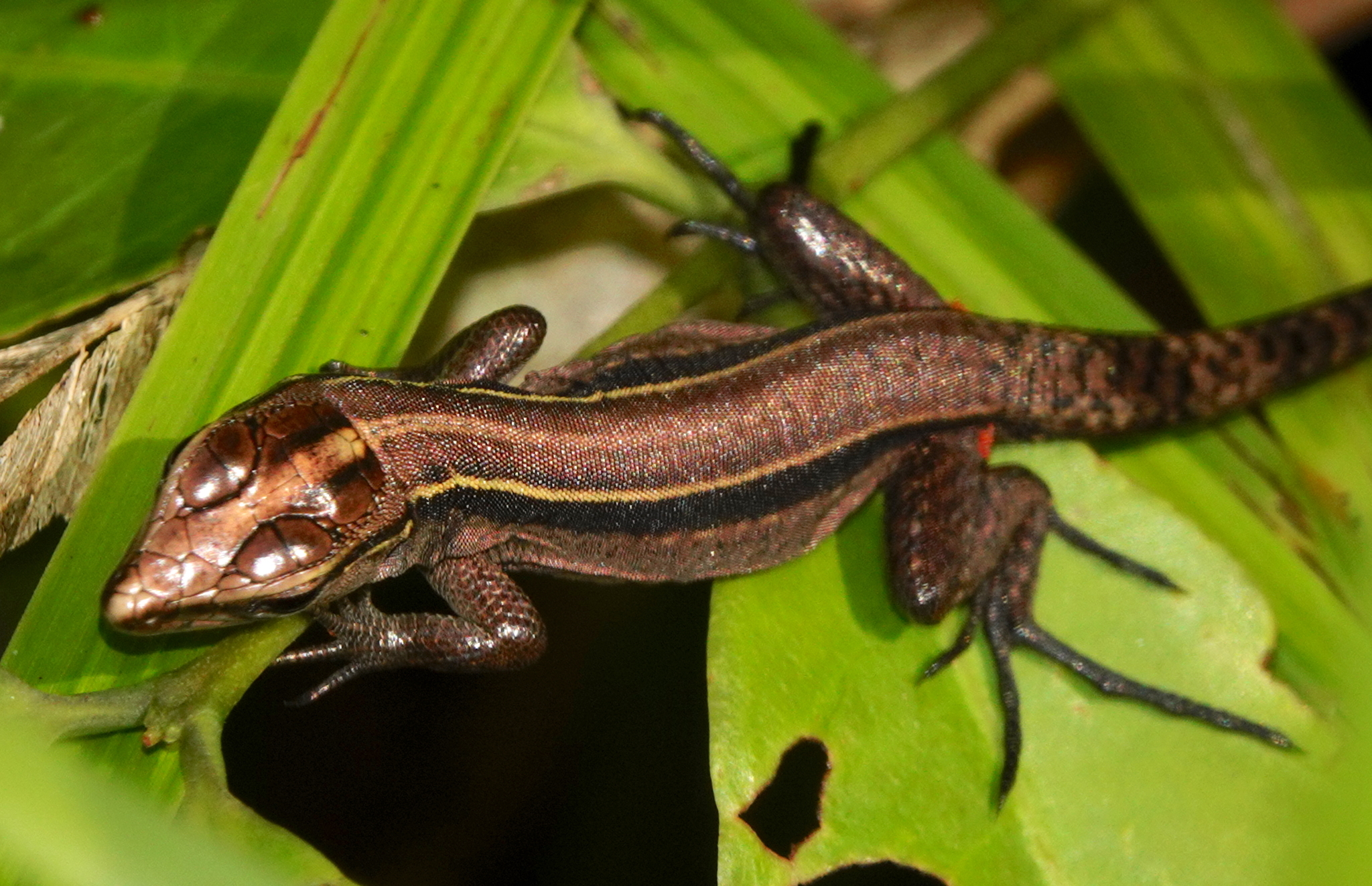
Colombia

== Geographic range ==
K. altamazonica is found in Bolivia, Brazil, Colombia, Ecuador, Peru, and Venezuela.

== Habitat ==
The preferred natural habitat of K. altamazonica is forest.

== Reproduction ==
K. altamazonica is oviparous.
