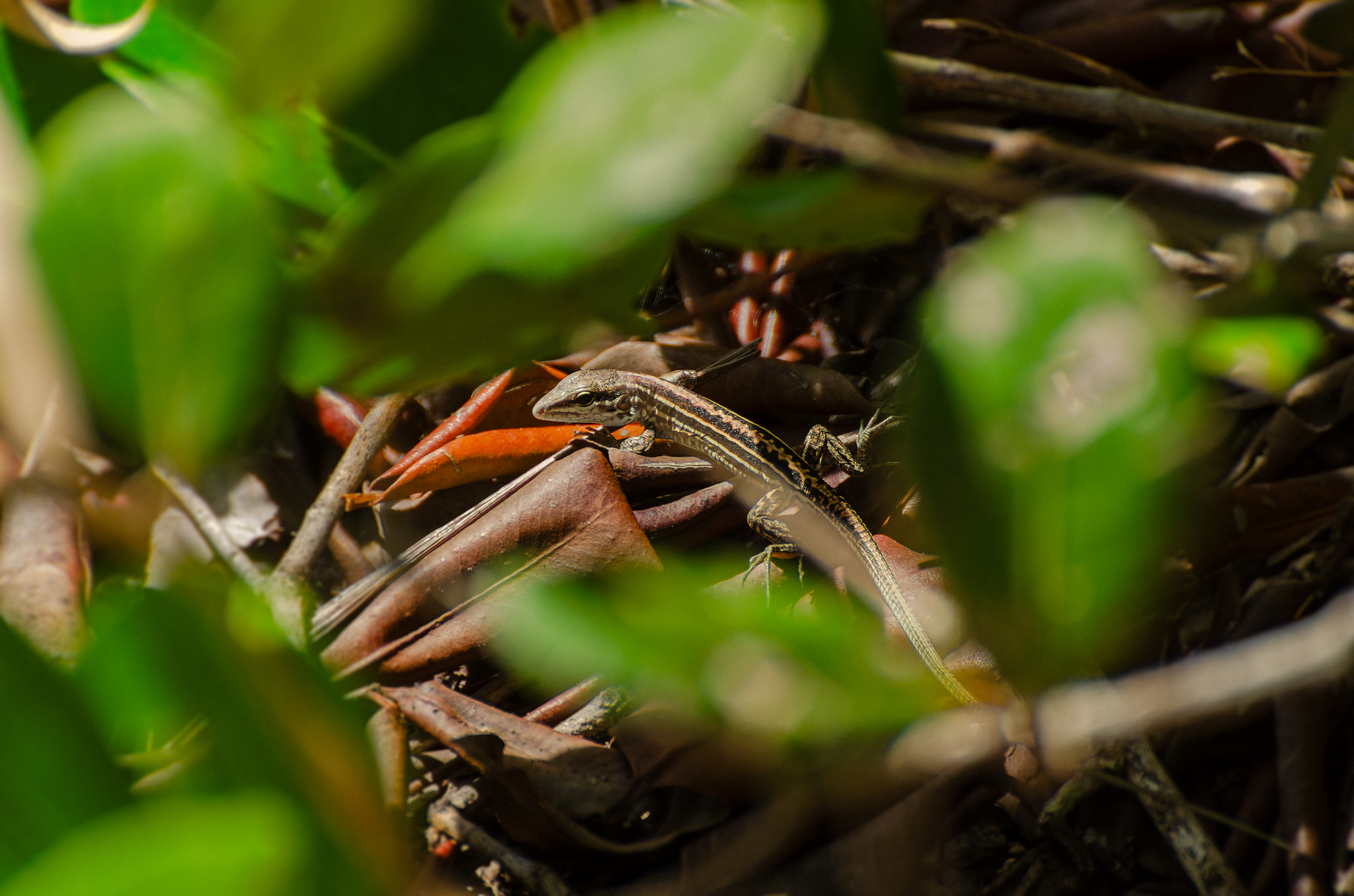

Scientific classification
- Kingdom: Animalia
- Phylum: Chordata
- Class: Reptilia
- Order: Squamata
- Suborder: Lacertoidea
- Family: Teiidae
- Genus: Ameivula
- Species: A. nativo

Binomial name
- Ameivula nativo (Rocha, Bergallo, & Peccinini-Seale, 1997)

= Ameivula nativo =

Species of lizard

Ameivula nativo is a species of teiid lizard endemic to Brazil.
