= Micrurus obscurus =

Conservation status
- Least Concern (IUCN 3.1)

Scientific classification
- Kingdom: Animalia
- Phylum: Chordata
- Class: Reptilia
- Order: Squamata
- Suborder: Serpentes
- Family: Elapidae
- Genus: Micrurus
- Species: M. obscurus

Binomial name
- Micrurus obscurus (Jan, 1872)
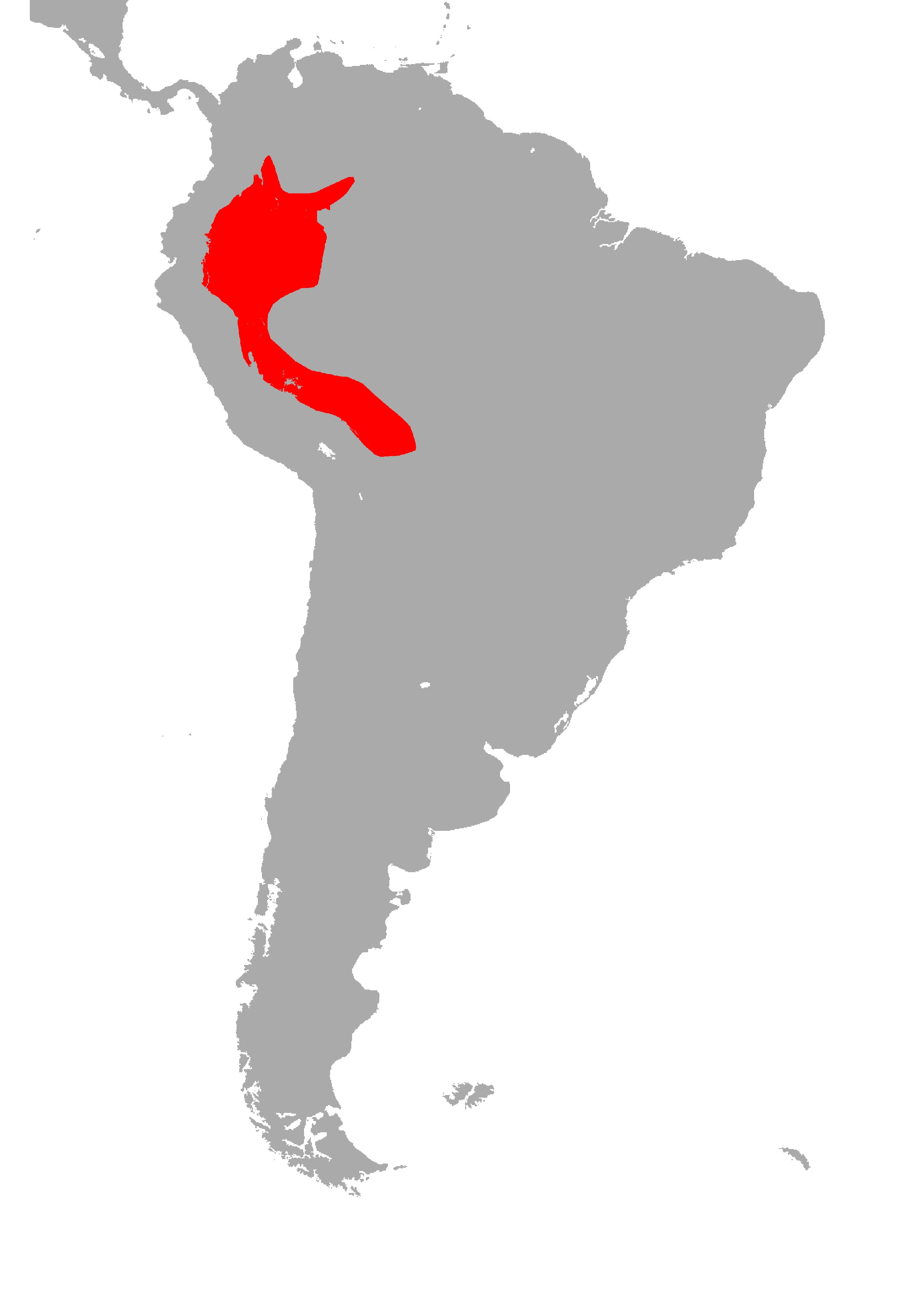

Synonyms
- Elaps corallinus var. obscura Jan, 1872; Micrurus spixii obscura (Jan, 1872); Micrurus spixii obscurus (Jan, 1872); Elaps heterozonus W. Peters, 1881; Elaps princeps Boulenger, 1905

Species of snake

Micrurus obscurus, also known commonly as the black-neck Amazonian coral snake and the Bolivian coral snake, is a species of venomous snake in the family Elapidae. The species is native to northwestern South America.

== Description ==
The color pattern of Micrurus obscurus consists of black, red, and yellow (or white) rings. The black rings are arranged in triads of three black rings separated by two yellow rings. The triads are separated by red rings. The yellow rings are as wide or wider than the black rings. The dorsal scales within the yellow rings are heavily marked with black on the tips and edges, making the rings appear grayish or greenish. The red rings are the widest and also contain black marks. Most specimens have 4–6 triads on the body.

Males have 200–228 ventrals and 17–22 subcaudals. Females have 207–225 ventrals and 16–22 subcaudals.

M. obscurus is a large species. The holotype of the synonym Elaps princeps has a total length (tail included) of 1.22 m (4.0 ft).

== Geographic distribution ==
Micrurus obscurus is found in northern Bolivia, northwestern Brazil, southeastern Colombia, eastern Ecuador, and eastern Peru.

== Habitat ==
The preferred natural habitat of Micrurus obscurus is forest, at elevations of 100–500 m (330–1,640 ft).

== Behavior ==
Micrurus obscurus is terrestrial, foraging in the leaf litter of the forest and sheltering under rotting fallen logs.

== Diet ==
Micrurus obscurus preys on a wide variety of poikilotherms, including caecilians, lizards such as Kentropyx pelviceps, and snakes such as Atractus collaris, Dipsas spp., Erythrolamprus miliaris, Erythrolamprus reginae, and Micrurus annellatus.

== Reproduction ==
Micrurus obscurus is oviparous.

== Venom ==
The venom of Micrurus obscurus is not as potent as those of other species of New World coral snakes. The estimated lethal dose of M. obscurus venom is 24–26 mg (dried weight) for an adult human. This is considerably weaker than venoms of smaller species of the genus Micrurus, the average estimated lethal dose of which is 4–7 mg. However, being a large species, M. obscurus is capable of carrying a large amount of venom. When "milked" by scientists, the average venom yield was 41 mg, and the maximum venom yield was 131 mg.
