= Holcosus orcesi =

Conservation status
- Critically Endangered (IUCN 3.1)

Scientific classification
- Kingdom: Animalia
- Phylum: Chordata
- Class: Reptilia
- Order: Squamata
- Family: Teiidae
- Genus: Holcosus
- Species: H. orcesi

Binomial name
- Holcosus orcesi (J. Peters, 1964)

Synonyms
- Ameiva orcesi J. Peters, 1964; Holcosus orcesi — Harvey, Ugueto & Gutberlet, 2012

Species of lizard

Holcosus orcesi, also known commonly as Peters' ameiva, is a species of lizard in the family Teiidae. The species is endemic to Ecuador.

== Etymology ==
The specific name, orcesi, is in honor of Ecuadorian herpetologist Gustavo Orcés.

== Habitat ==
The preferred habitat of Holcosus orcesi is shrubland at altitudes of 1,250–1,700 m (4,100–5,580 ft).

== Reproduction ==
Holcosus orcesi is oviparous.
