= Holcosus pulcher =

Scientific classification
- Kingdom: Animalia
- Phylum: Chordata
- Class: Reptilia
- Order: Squamata
- Family: Teiidae
- Genus: Holcosus
- Species: H. pulcher

Binomial name
- Holcosus pulcher (Hallowell, 1861)

Species of lizard

Holcosus pulcher is a species of lizard in the family Teiidae. The species is native to Costa Rica and Honduras.
