= Ameivula confusioniba =

Conservation status
- Least Concern (IUCN 3.1)

Scientific classification
- Kingdom: Animalia
- Phylum: Chordata
- Class: Reptilia
- Order: Squamata
- Family: Teiidae
- Genus: Ameivula
- Species: A. confusioniba

Binomial name
- Ameivula confusioniba (Arias, de Carvalho, Zaher, & Rodrigues, 2011)

Species of lizard

Ameivula confusioniba is a species of teiid lizard endemic to Brazil.
