= Ameivula cipoensis =

Scientific classification
- Kingdom: Animalia
- Phylum: Chordata
- Class: Reptilia
- Order: Squamata
- Family: Teiidae
- Genus: Ameivula
- Species: A. cipoensis

Binomial name
- Ameivula cipoensis Arias, de Carvalho, Zaher, & Rodrigues, 2014

Species of lizard

Ameivula cipoensis is a species of teiid lizard endemic to Brazil.
