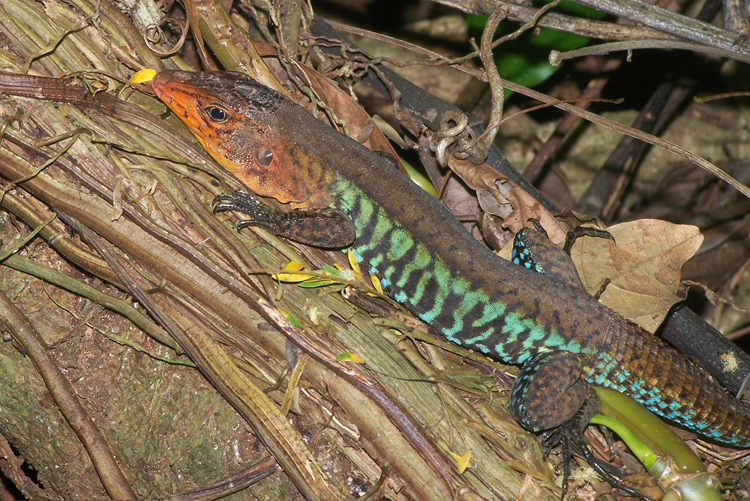

Conservation status
- Least Concern (IUCN 3.1)

Scientific classification
- Kingdom: Animalia
- Phylum: Chordata
- Class: Reptilia
- Order: Squamata
- Family: Teiidae
- Genus: Holcosus
- Species: H. undulatus

Binomial name
- Holcosus undulatus (Wiegmann, 1834)

Synonyms
- Cnemidophorus undulatus Wiegmann, 1834; Ameiva undulata — Gray, 1845; Cnemidophorus amivoides Cope, 1894; Ameiva undulata — H.M. Smith & Laufe, 1946; Holcosus undulatus Harvey, Ugueto & Gutberlet, 2012

= Holcosus undulatus =

Species of lizard

Holcosus undulatus, also known commonly as the barred whiptail, the metallic ameiva, and the rainbow ameiva, is a species of lizard in the family Teiidae. The species occurs in Central America from South Mexico to Costa Rica. There are three recognized subspecies.

== Description ==
H. undulatus is brown-coloured, with a series of darker zig-zag bars running down the sides, often with light blue and green markings along the sides and underside. It is similar to the Middle American ameiva (H. festivus).

== Habitat ==
H. undulatus lives in litter in open habitats.

== Subspecies ==
The following three subspecies, including the nominotypical subspecies, are recognized as being valid.

- Holcosus undulatus dexter (H.M. Smith & Laufe, 1946)
- Holcosus undulatus miadis (Barbour & Loveridge, 1929)
- Holcosus undulatus undulatus (Wiegmann, 1834)

Nota bene: A trinomial authority in parentheses indicates that the subspecies was originally described in a genus other than Holcosus.
