= Glaucomastix itabaianensis =

Scientific classification
- Kingdom: Animalia
- Phylum: Chordata
- Class: Reptilia
- Order: Squamata
- Family: Teiidae
- Genus: Glaucomastix
- Species: G. itabaianensis

Binomial name
- Glaucomastix itabaianensis Rosario, Santos, Arias, Rocha, Dias, Carvalho, & Rodrigues, 2019

Species of lizard

Glaucomastix itabaianensis is a species of teiid lizard endemic to Brazil.
