= Glaucomastix littoralis =

Scientific classification
- Domain: Eukaryota
- Kingdom: Animalia
- Phylum: Chordata
- Class: Reptilia
- Order: Squamata
- Family: Teiidae
- Genus: Glaucomastix
- Species: G. littoralis

Binomial name
- Glaucomastix littoralis (Rocha, Bamberg Araújo, Vrcibradic, & Mamede da Costa, 2000)

Species of lizard

Glaucomastix littoralis is a species of teiid lizard endemic to Brazil.
