= Holcosus niceforoi =

Conservation status
- Least Concern (IUCN 3.1)

Scientific classification
- Kingdom: Animalia
- Phylum: Chordata
- Class: Reptilia
- Order: Squamata
- Family: Teiidae
- Genus: Holcosus
- Species: H. niceforoi

Binomial name
- Holcosus niceforoi (Dunn, 1943)

Synonyms
- Ameiva festiva niceforoi Dunn, 1943; Ameiva niceforoi Dunn, 1943

Species of lizard

Holcosus niceforoi is a species of lizard in the family Teiidae. The species is endemic to Colombia.

== Etymology ==
The specific name, niceforoi, is in honor of missionary Brother Nicéforo María, born Antoine Rouhaire in France, who established a natural history museum in Medellín, Colombia.

== Geographic distribution ==
Holcosus niceforoi is found in central Colombia, in Cundinamarca Department and Tolima Department.

== Habitat ==
The preferred natural habitat of Holcosus niceforoi is forest or savanna, at elevations of 225–1,300 m (738–4,265 ft), but it has also been found in disturbed habitats including cultivated fields, gardens, roadsides, and trash dumps.

== Behavior ==
Holcosus niceforoi is terrestrial.

== Reproduction ==
Holcosus niceforoi is oviparous.
