= Glaucomastix =

Scientific classification
- Kingdom: Animalia
- Phylum: Chordata
- Class: Reptilia
- Order: Squamata
- Family: Teiidae
- Subfamily: Teiinae
- Genus: Glaucomastix; Goicoechea et al., 2016

Genus of lizards

Glaucomastix is a genus of lizards that belongs to the family Teiidae. The genus is endemic to Brazil.

== Species ==
The genus Glaucomastix contains the following five species, listed alphabetically by specific name.

- Glaucomastix abaetensis (Reis Dias, Rocha & Vrcibradic, 2002) – Bahian sand dune lizard
- Glaucomastix cyanura (Arias, Carvalho, Rodrigues & Zaher, 2011)
- Glaucomastix itabaianensis Rosário, Santos, Arias, Rocha, Reis Dias, Carvalho & Rodrigues, 2019
- Glaucomastix littoralis (Rocha, Bamberg Araújo, Vrcibradic & Mamede da Costa, 2000)
- Glaucomastix venetacauda (Arias, Carvalho, Rodrigues & Zaher, 2011)

Nota bene: A binomial authority in parentheses indicates that the species was originally described in a genus other than Glaucomastix.
