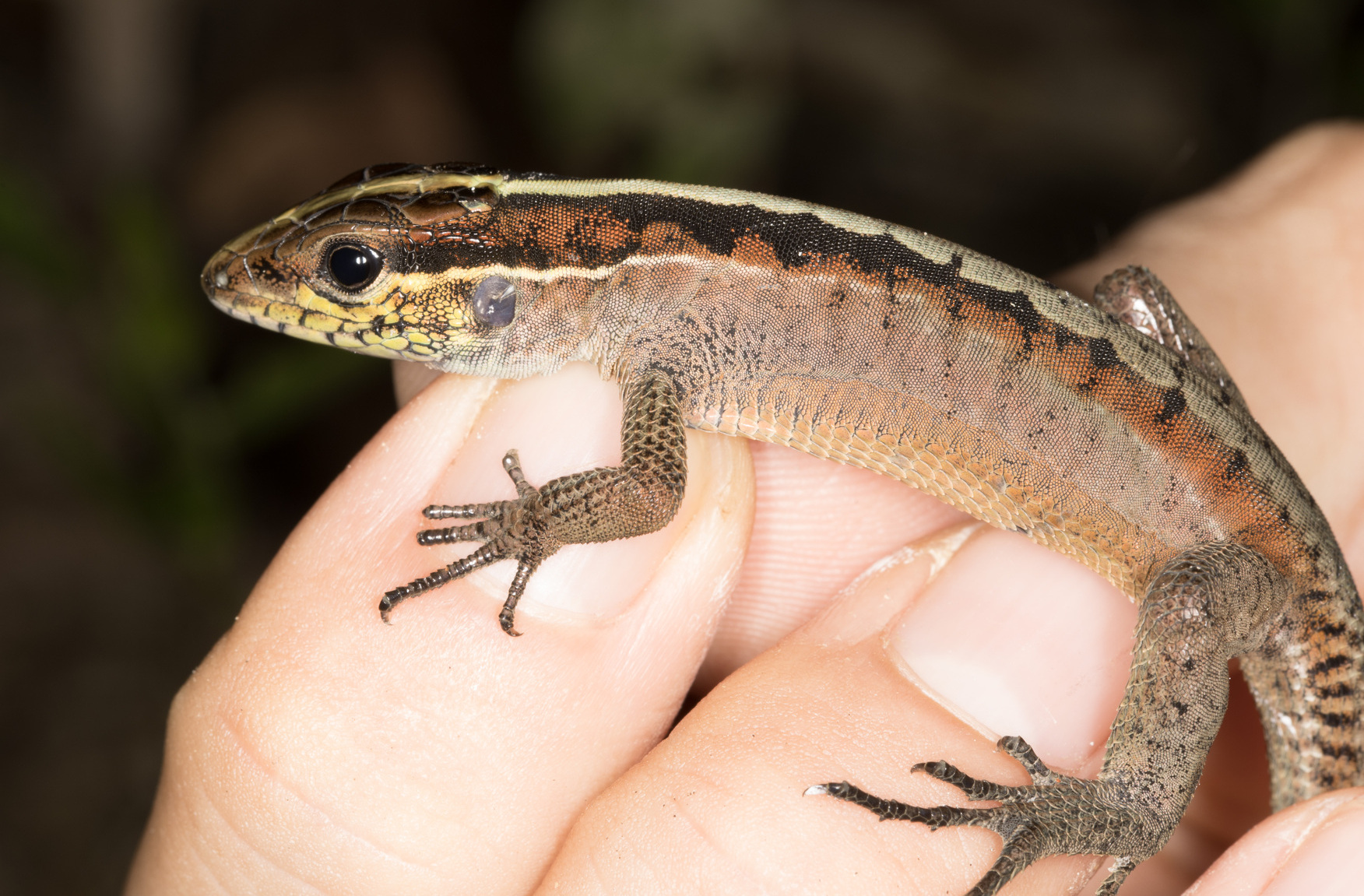
- In Peru

Scientific classification
- Domain: Eukaryota
- Kingdom: Animalia
- Phylum: Chordata
- Class: Reptilia
- Order: Squamata
- Family: Teiidae
- Genus: Kentropyx
- Species: K. pelviceps

Binomial name
- Kentropyx pelviceps (Cope, 1868)

= Kentropyx pelviceps =

Species of lizard

Kentropyx pelviceps, the forest whiptail, is a species of teiid lizard found in Ecuador, Colombia, Peru, Brazil, and Bolivia.

== Gallery ==
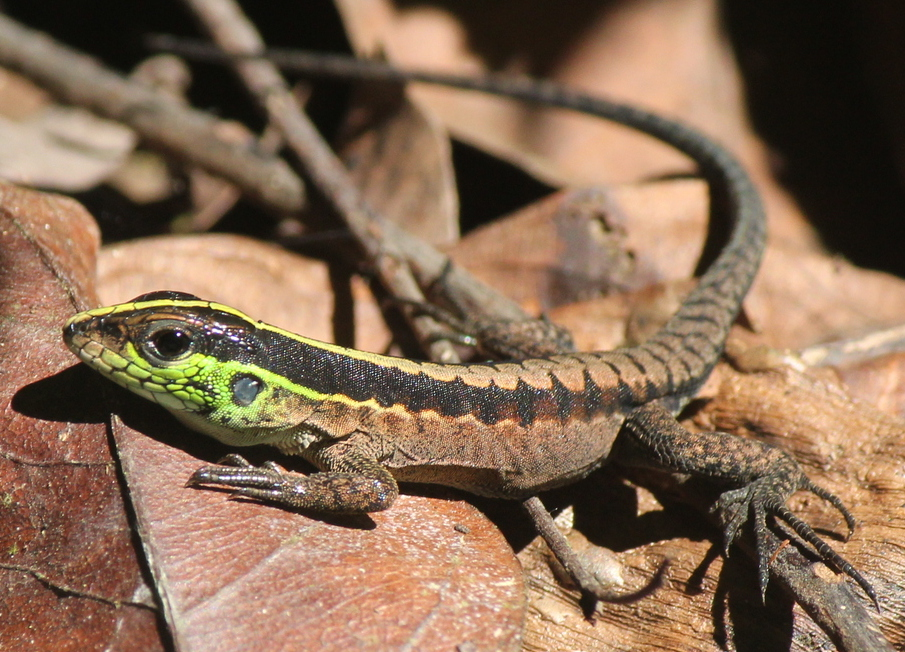
Ecuador

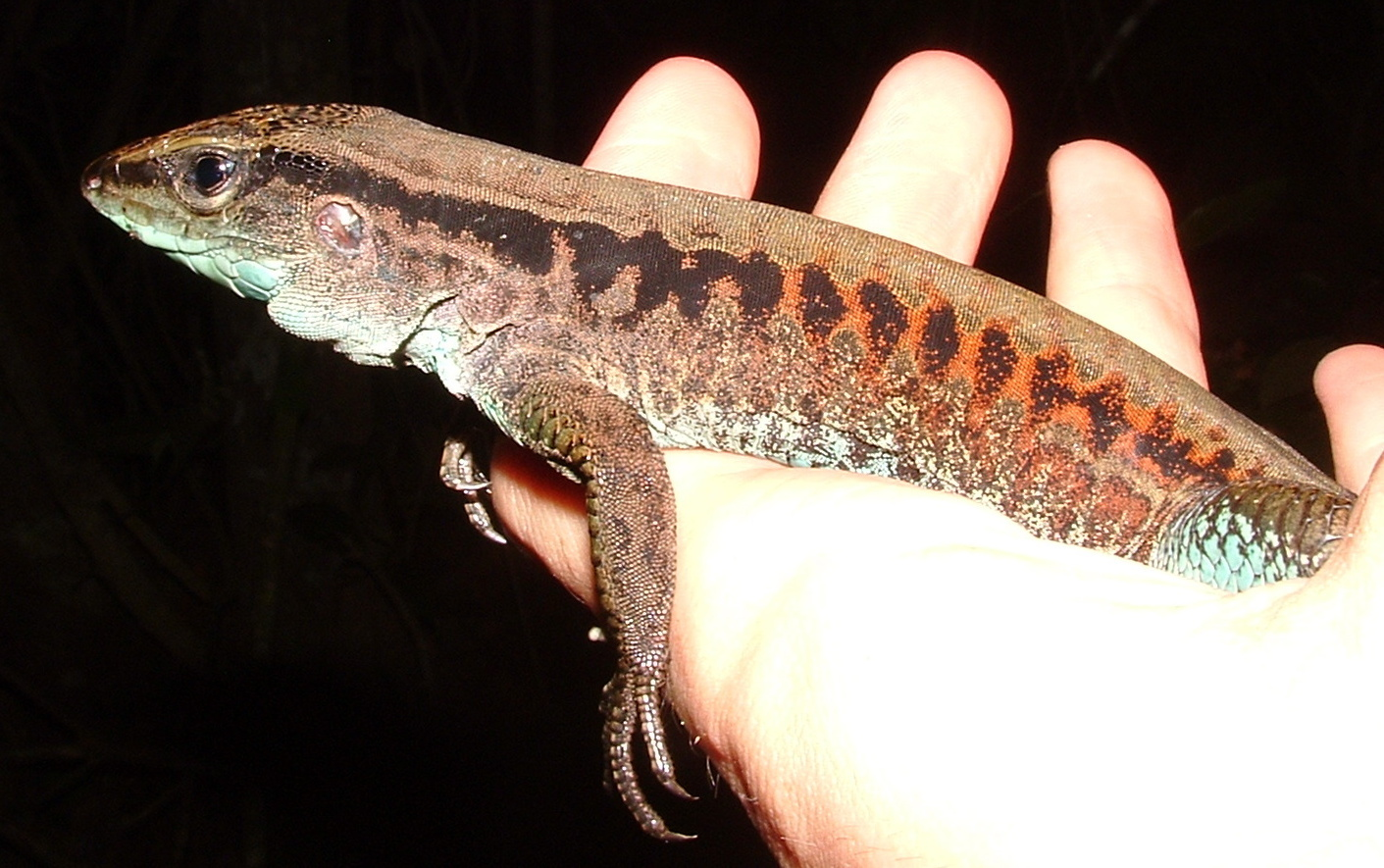
Ecuador

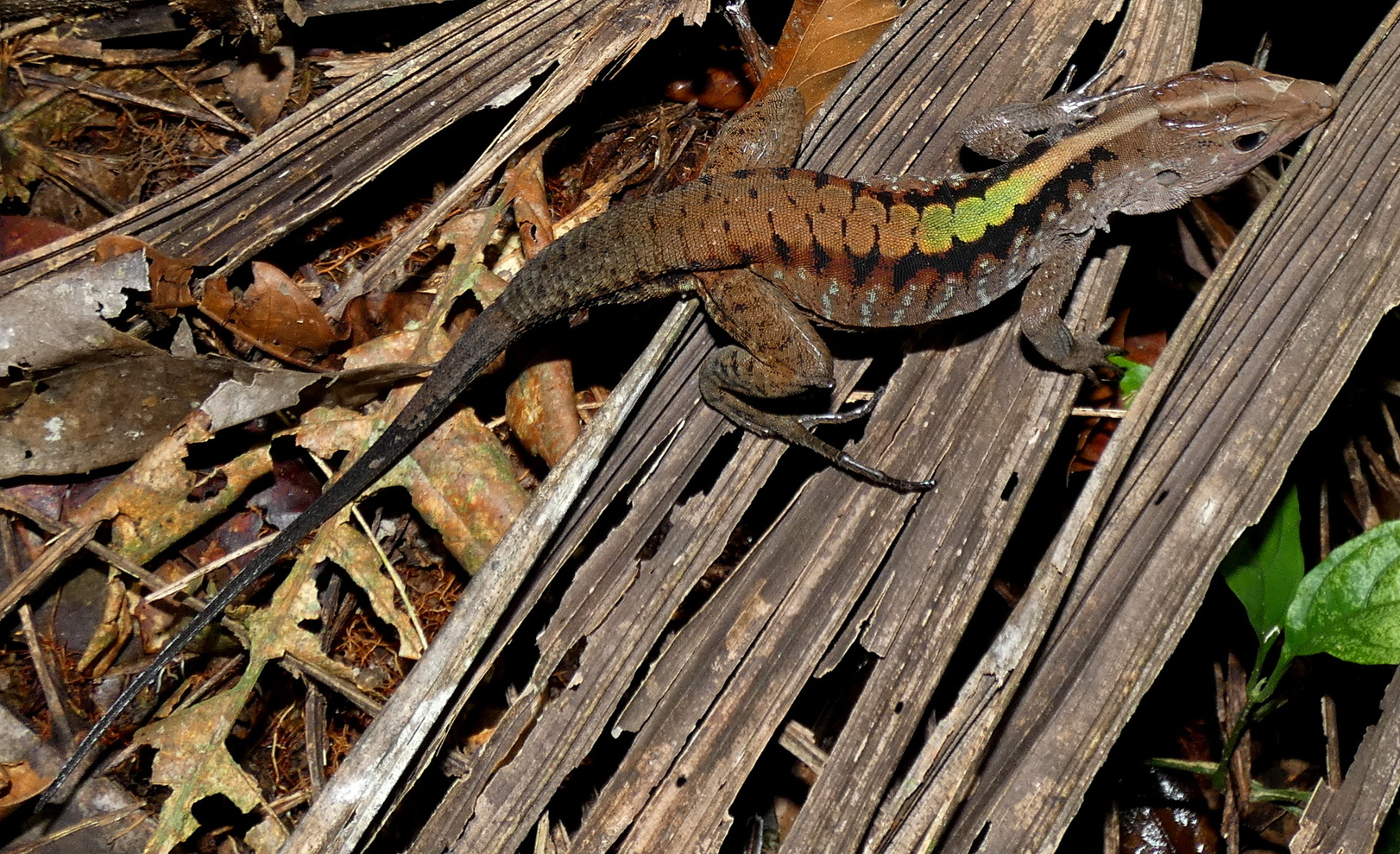
Ecuador
