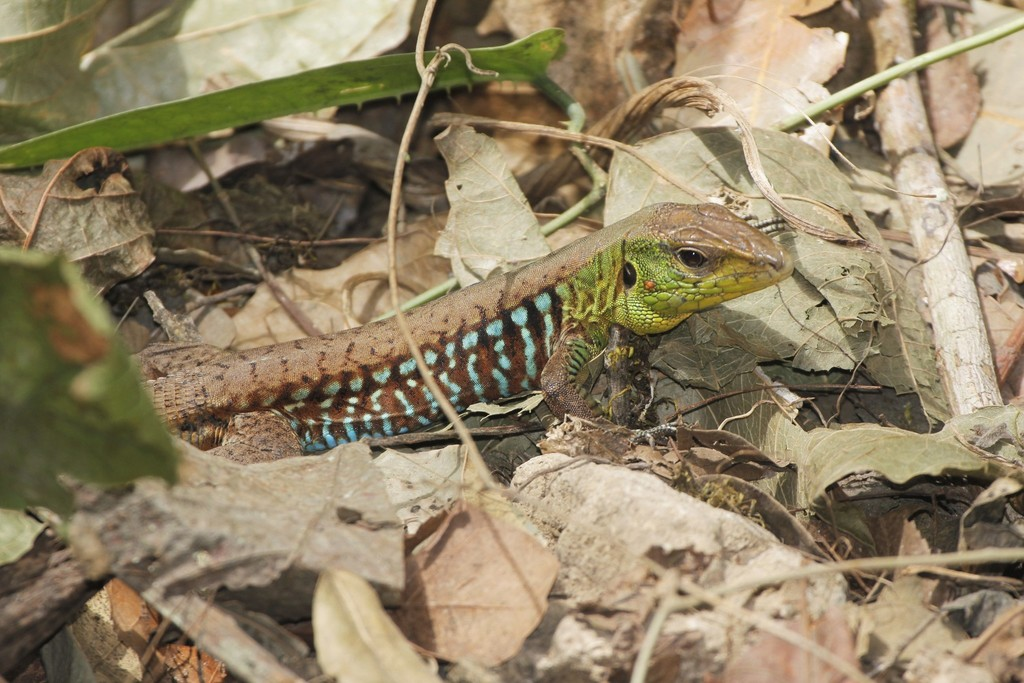

Scientific classification
- Kingdom: Animalia
- Phylum: Chordata
- Class: Reptilia
- Order: Squamata
- Family: Teiidae
- Genus: Holcosus
- Species: H. amphigrammus

Binomial name
- Holcosus amphigrammus (H.M. Smith & Laufe, 1945)

= Holcosus amphigrammus =

Species of lizard

Holcosus amphigrammus, also known commonly as the rainbow ameiva, is a species of lizard in the family Teiidae. The species is endemic to Mexico.
