= Aurivela =

Scientific classification
- Kingdom: Animalia
- Phylum: Chordata
- Class: Reptilia
- Order: Squamata
- Family: Teiidae
- Subfamily: Teiinae
- Genus: Aurivela; Harvey, Ugueto & Gutberlet, 2012

Genus of lizards

Aurivela is a genus of lizards that belongs to the family Teiidae. There are two species in the genus. Both are endemic to Argentina.

== Species ==
There are two species in the genus:

- Aurivela longicauda (Bell, 1843) – longtail whiptail
- Aurivela tergolaevigata (Cabrera, 2004)

Nota bene: A binomial authority in parentheses indicates that the species was originally described in a genus other than Aurivela.
