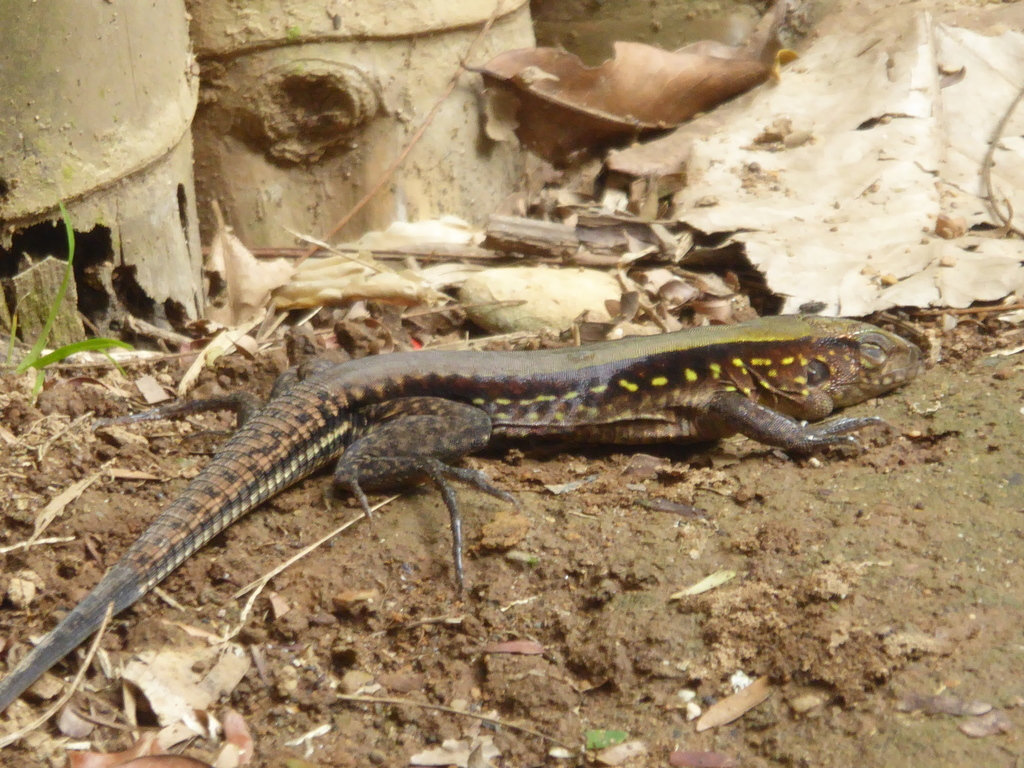

Scientific classification
- Kingdom: Animalia
- Phylum: Chordata
- Class: Reptilia
- Order: Squamata
- Family: Teiidae
- Genus: Holcosus
- Species: H. stuarti

Binomial name
- Holcosus stuarti (H.M. Smith, 1940)

Synonyms
- Ameiva undulata stuarti H.M. Smith, 1940; Holcosus undulatus stuarti — Harvey et al., 2012; Holcosus stuarti — Meza-Lázaro et al., 2015

= Holcosus stuarti =

Species of lizard

Holcosus stuarti, also known commonly as the rainbow ameiva, is a species of lizard in the family Teiidae. The species is endemic to Mexico.
