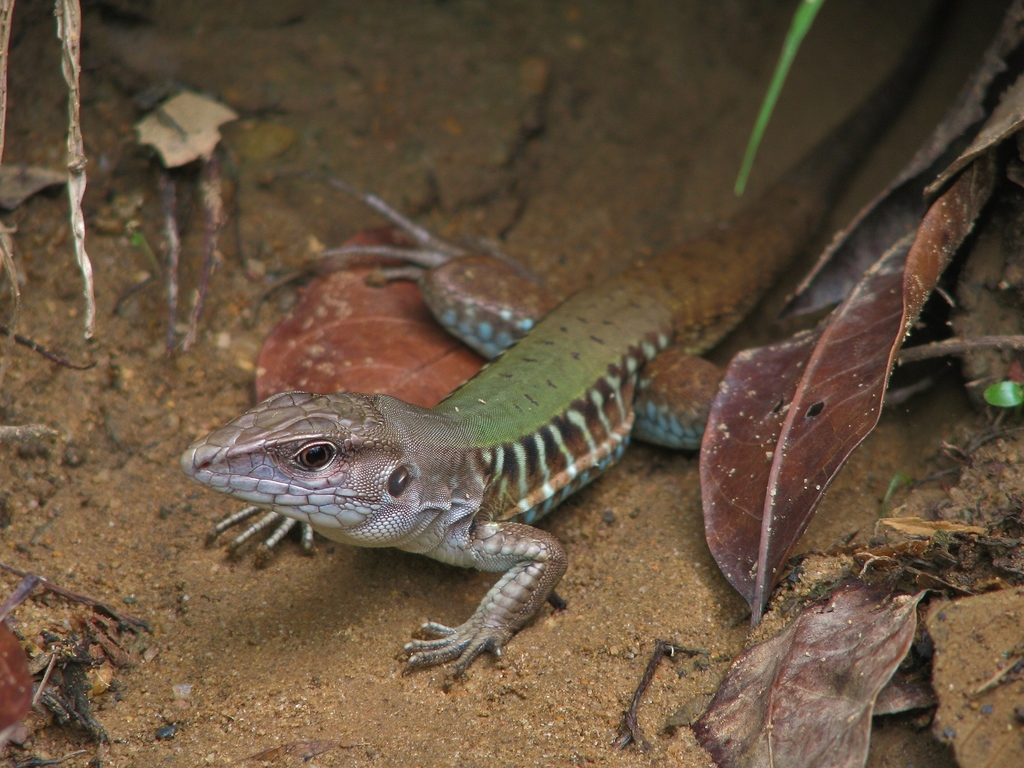

Scientific classification
- Kingdom: Animalia
- Phylum: Chordata
- Class: Reptilia
- Order: Squamata
- Family: Teiidae
- Genus: Holcosus
- Species: H. hartwegi

Binomial name
- Holcosus hartwegi (H.M. Smith, 1940)

= Holcosus hartwegi =

Species of lizard

Holcosus hartwegi, also known commonly as the rainbow ameiva, is a species of lizard in the family Teiidae. The species is native to Guatemala and Mexico. It was named after American herpetologist Norman Edouard Hartweg (1904-1964).
