= Holcosus thomasi =

Scientific classification
- Kingdom: Animalia
- Phylum: Chordata
- Class: Reptilia
- Order: Squamata
- Family: Teiidae
- Genus: Holcosus
- Species: H. thomasi

Binomial name
- Holcosus thomasi (H.M. Smith & Laufe, 1946)

Synonyms
- Ameiva undulata thomasi H.M. Smith & Laufe, 1946; Holcosus undulatus thomasi — Harvey et al., 2012; Holcosus thomasi — Meza-Lázaro et al., 2015

Species of lizard

Holcosus thomasi, also known commonly as the rainbow ameiva, is a species of lizard in the family Teiidae. The species is native to Guatemala and the adjacent Mexican state of Chiapas.
