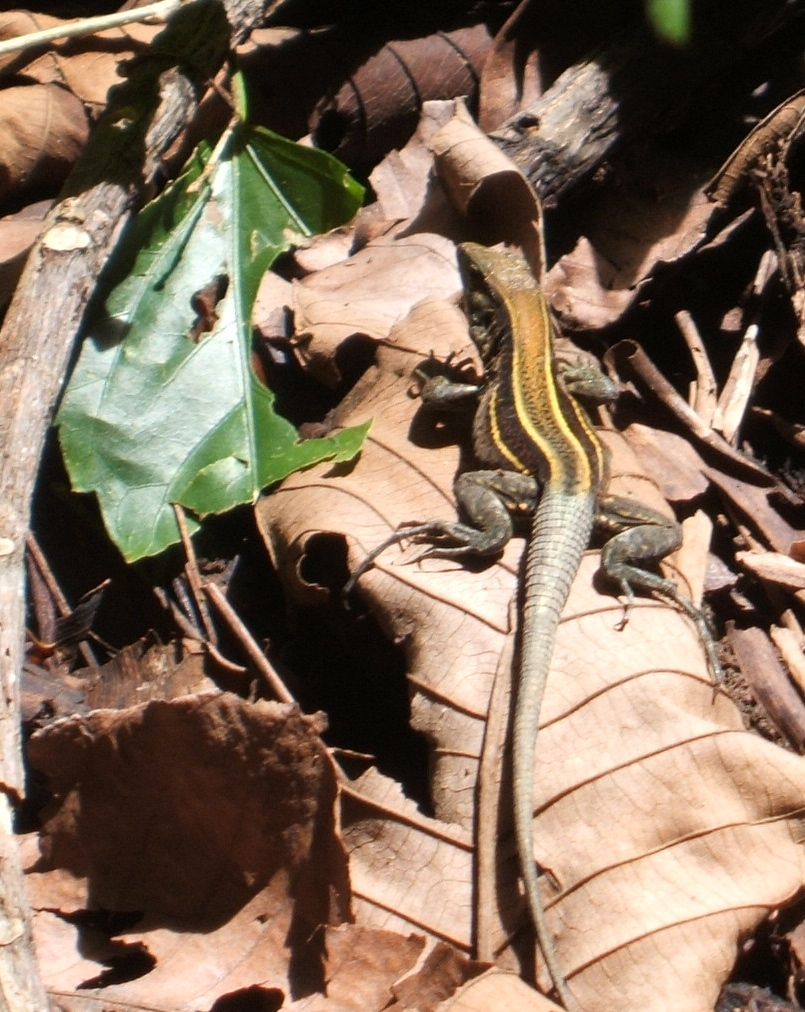
- Found in Costa Rica

Conservation status
- Least Concern (IUCN 3.1)

Scientific classification
- Kingdom: Animalia
- Phylum: Chordata
- Class: Reptilia
- Order: Squamata
- Family: Teiidae
- Genus: Holcosus
- Species: H. quadrilineatus

Binomial name
- Holcosus quadrilineatus (Hallowell, 1861)

Synonyms
- Ameiva quadrilineata Hallowell, 1861; Holcosus quadrilineatus — Harvey et al., 2012

= Holcosus quadrilineatus =

Species of lizard

Holcosus quadrilineatus, also known commonly as the four-lined ameiva and the four-lined whiptail, is a species of lizard in the family Teiidae. The species is endemic to Central America.

== Geographic range ==
H. quadrilineatus is found in western Panama, Costa Rica, and southeastern Nicaragua.

== Description ==
H. quadrilineatus is brown-coloured, with four light lines running down the back. Juveniles have metallic-blue tails.

== Habitat ==
H. quadrilineatus lives in open habitats.
