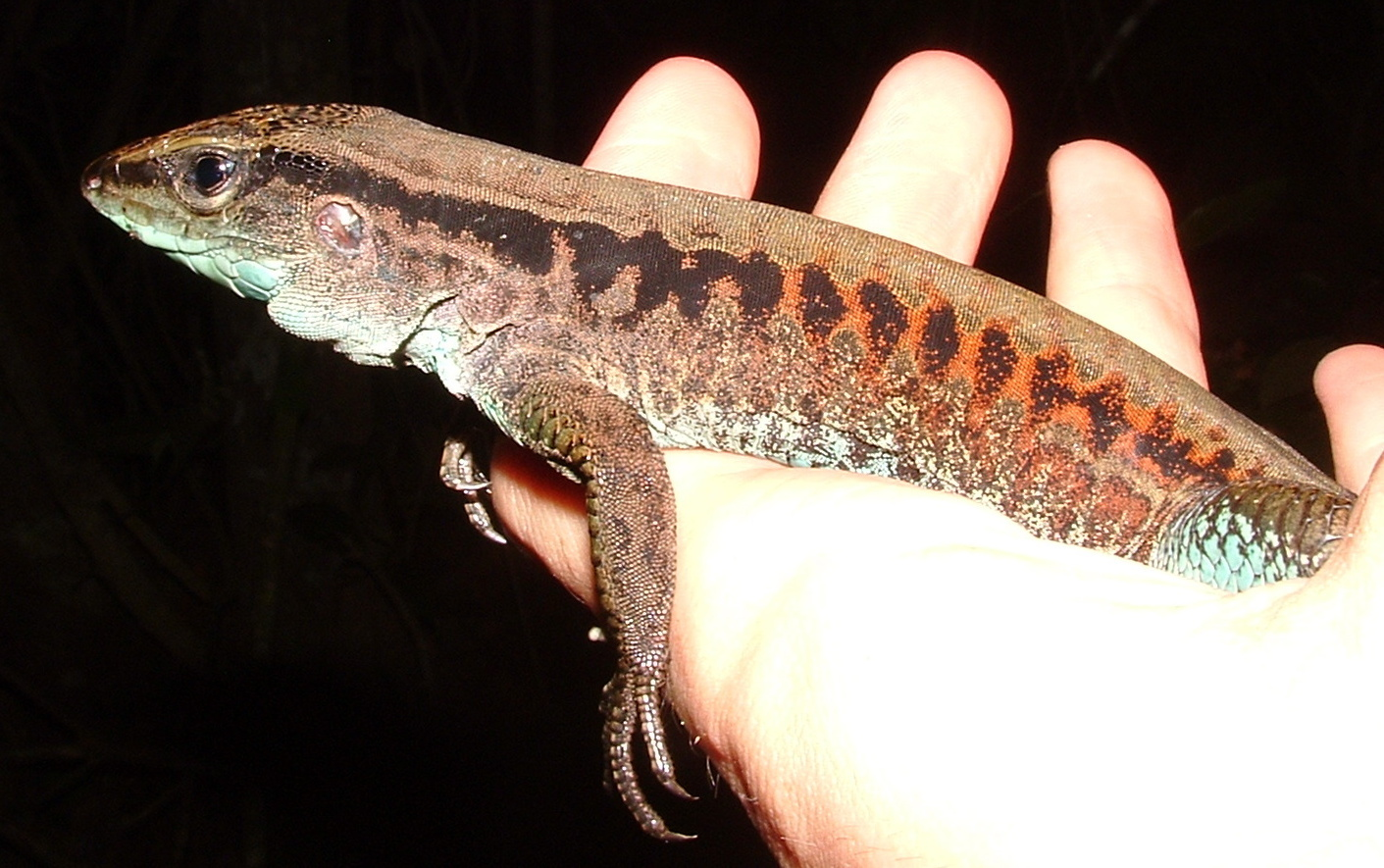
- Kentropyx pelviceps (forest whiptail)

Scientific classification
- Kingdom: Animalia
- Phylum: Chordata
- Class: Reptilia
- Order: Squamata
- Family: Teiidae
- Subfamily: Teiinae
- Genus: Kentropyx; Spix, 1825

Species
- 9 species, see text.

= Kentropyx =

Genus of lizards

Kentropyx is a genus of whiptail lizards in the family Teiidae. The genus is endemic to South America including Trinidad and Barbados.

== Species ==
There are nine valid species in this genus (listed alphabetically by specific name).

- Kentropyx altamazonica (Cope, 1876) – Cocha whiptail
- Kentropyx borckiana (W. Peters, 1869) – Guyana kentropyx
- Kentropyx calcarata Spix, 1825 – striped forest whiptail
- Kentropyx lagartija Gallardo, 1962 – Tucuman whiptail
- Kentropyx paulensis (Boettger, 1893) – Boettger's kentropyx
- Kentropyx pelviceps (Cope, 1868) – forest whiptail
- Kentropyx striata (Daudin, 1802) – Suriname striped whiptail
- Kentropyx vanzoi Gallagher & Dixon, 1980 – Gallagher's kentropyx
- Kentropyx viridistriga (Boulenger, 1894) – green kentropyx

Nota bene: A binomial authority in parentheses indicates that the species was originally described in a genus other than Kentropyx.
