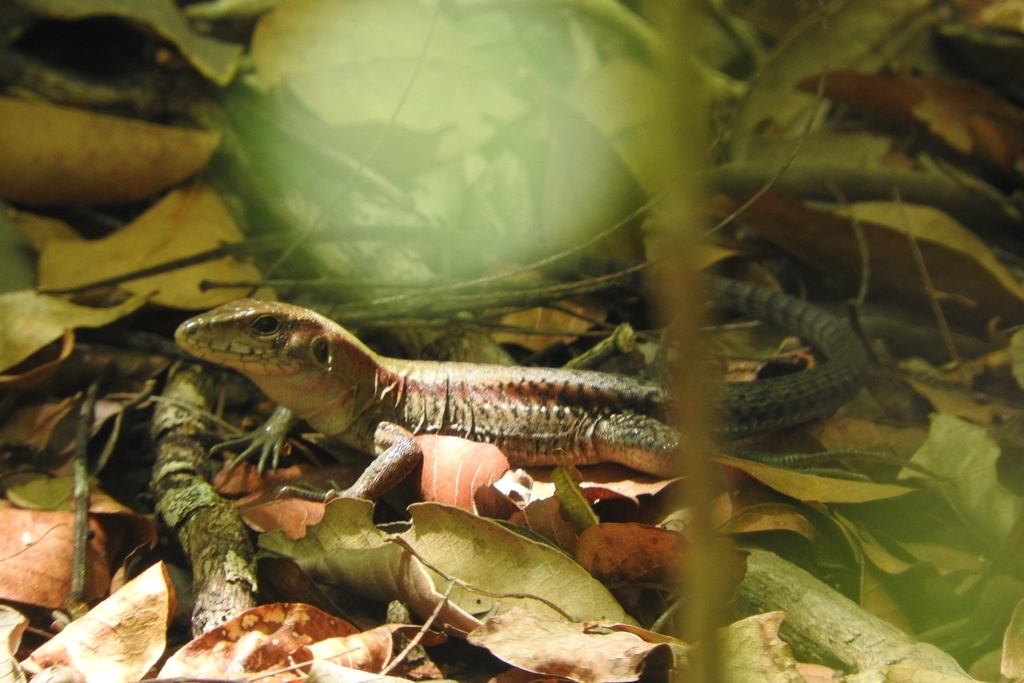

Scientific classification
- Kingdom: Animalia
- Phylum: Chordata
- Class: Reptilia
- Order: Squamata
- Family: Teiidae
- Genus: Holcosus
- Species: H. gaigeae

Binomial name
- Holcosus gaigeae (H.M. Smith & Laufe, 1946)

= Holcosus gaigeae =

Species of lizard

Holcosus gaigeae, also known commonly as the rainbow ameiva is a species of lizard in the family Teiidae. The species is endemic to Mexico.
