= Lumbrerasaurus =

Lumbrerasaurus Temporal range: Early Eocene

Scientific classification
- Kingdom: Animalia
- Phylum: Chordata
- Class: Reptilia
- Order: Squamata
- Family: Teiidae
- Subfamily: Tupinambinae
- Genus: †Lumbrerasaurus; Donadío, 1985
- Species: †L. scagliai

Binomial name
- †Lumbrerasaurus scagliai Donadío, 1985

Extinct genus of teiid lizard

Lumbrerasaurus is an extinct genus of teiid lizard from northwestern Argentina. The genus is known from a single species, Lumbrerasaurus scagliai. Fossils referred to the species were recovered from the Lumbrera Formation near Pampa Grande, Salta Province, and are generally treated as Early Eocene in age. Modern redescriptions have interpreted Lumbrerasaurus as an extinct member of Tupinambinae. The material has been cited as among the earliest records of crown-group teiid lizards in South America.

== Discovery and naming ==
The genus and species Lumbrerasaurus scagliai were named by Oscar E. Donadío in 1985, based on fossils from the Lumbrera Formation of Salta Province, Argentina. The Lumbrera Formation is the upper unit of the Santa Bárbara Subgroup of the Salta Group in northwestern Argentina.

The described material was collected during a joint field expedition of the Museo de La Plata (MLP) and the Museo Municipal de Ciencias Naturales "Lorenzo Scaglia" (MMP) in 1979. The fossils were recovered from a canyon between the Bordo and Toro rivers near Pampa Grande and were reported as coming from a level about 5 metres (16 ft) below "Faja Verde I" within the lower part of the Lumbrera Formation. The remains were described as closely associated and representing a single individual.

Donadío (1985) originally described Lumbrerasaurus scagliai as a teiid lizard and placed it within Tupinambinae. While these affinities have not been extensively questioned, some authors questioned whether the genus was adequately diagnosed, and considered Lumbrerasaurus to be a nomen dubium. Subsequent research has regarded it as valid and distinct taxon.
