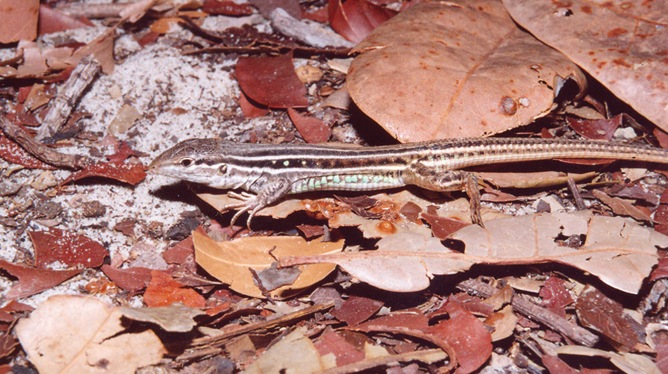
- Ameivula ocellifera in Lençóis Maranhenses National Park, Maranhão State, northeastern Brazil. Photo by J. P. Miranda.

Scientific classification
- Kingdom: Animalia
- Phylum: Chordata
- Class: Reptilia
- Order: Squamata
- Family: Teiidae
- Subfamily: Teiinae
- Genus: Ameivula; Harvey, Ugueto & Gutberlet, 2012

= Ameivula =

Genus of lizards

Ameivula is a genus of lizards in the family Teiidae. The genus is endemic to South America. Many species in the genus Ameivula were previously listed in the genus Cnemidophorus.

== Species ==
The following 11 species, listed alphabetically, are recognized as being valid.

- Ameivula abalosi (Cabrera, 2012)
- Ameivula apipensis Arias, Recoder, Álvarez, Etchepare, Quipildor, Lobo & Rodrigues, 2018
- Ameivula cipoensis Arias, Carvalho, Zaher & Rodrigues, 2014
- Ameivula confusioniba (Arias, Carvalho, Rodrigues & Zaher, 2011)
- Ameivula jalapensis (Colli, Giugliano, Mesquita & França, 2009)
- Ameivula mumbuca (Colli et al., 2003)
- Ameivula nativo (Rocha, Bergallo & Peccinini-Seale, 1997)
- Ameivula nigrigula (Arias, Carvalho, Rodrigues & Zaher, 2011)
- Ameivula ocellifera (Spix, 1825) – Spix's whiptail
- Ameivula pyrrhogularis (Basto da Silva & Ávila-Pires, 2013)
- Ameivula xacriaba Arias, Teixeira Jr., Recoder, Carvalho, Zaher & Rodrigues, 2014

Nota bene: A binomial authority in parentheses indicates that the species was originally described in a genus other than Ameivula.
