= Wautaugategu =

Wautaugategu Temporal range: Middle Miocene (Barstovian 2), 4.8–14.0 Ma

Scientific classification
- Kingdom: Animalia
- Phylum: Chordata
- Class: Reptilia
- Order: Squamata
- Family: Teiidae
- Subfamily: Tupinambinae
- Genus: †Wautaugategu; Bourque & Stanley, 2025
- Species: †W. formidus

Binomial name
- †Wautaugategu formidus Bourque & Stanley, 2025

Extinct genus of teiid lizard

Wautaugategu is an extinct genus of teiid lizard in the subfamily Tupinambinae, known from the Middle Miocene of the southeastern United States. The genus contains a single species, Wautaugategu formidus, described from a single thoracic vertebra recovered from a Barstovian 2 paleocoastal deposit in southwestern Georgia, United States.

== Discovery and naming ==
Wautaugategu formidus was described in 2025 by Jason R. Bourque and Edward L. Stanley in the Journal of Paleontology based on a single vertebra interpreted as belonging to a tupinambine teiid, anatomically similar to modern tegus. The fossil was excavated in the early 2000s from a fuller's earth clay mine in southwestern Georgia, just north of the Florida border, and housed in the Florida Museum of Natural History collections. It was later recognized as a vertebra from a tegu-like animal.

The generic name, Wautaugategu, references Wautauga State Forest near the discovery area, combined with "tegu", the common name used for some tupinambines. The specific name, formidus, is a Latin word meaning 'warm', alluding to the climatic conditions the taxon would have inhabited and the preferred body temperatures of living relatives.

== See also ==
- Middle Miocene Climatic Optimum
