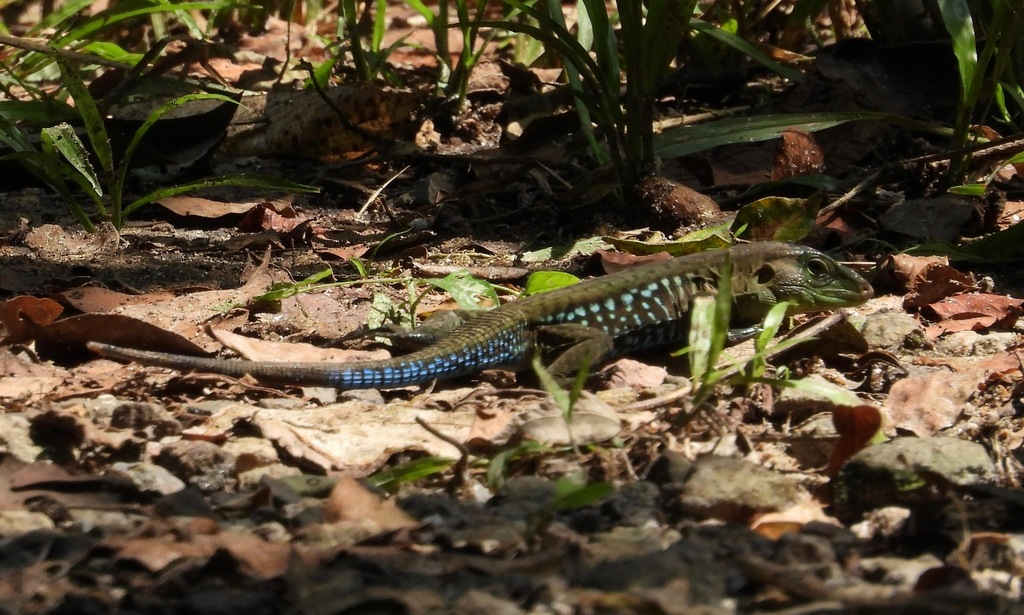

Scientific classification
- Kingdom: Animalia
- Phylum: Chordata
- Class: Reptilia
- Order: Squamata
- Family: Teiidae
- Genus: Holcosus
- Species: H. parvus

Binomial name
- Holcosus parvus (Barbour & Noble, 1915)

= Holcosus parvus =

Species of lizard

Holcosus parvus, also known commonly as the rainbow ameiva, is a species of lizard in the family Teiidae. The species is native to Costa Rica and Mexico.
