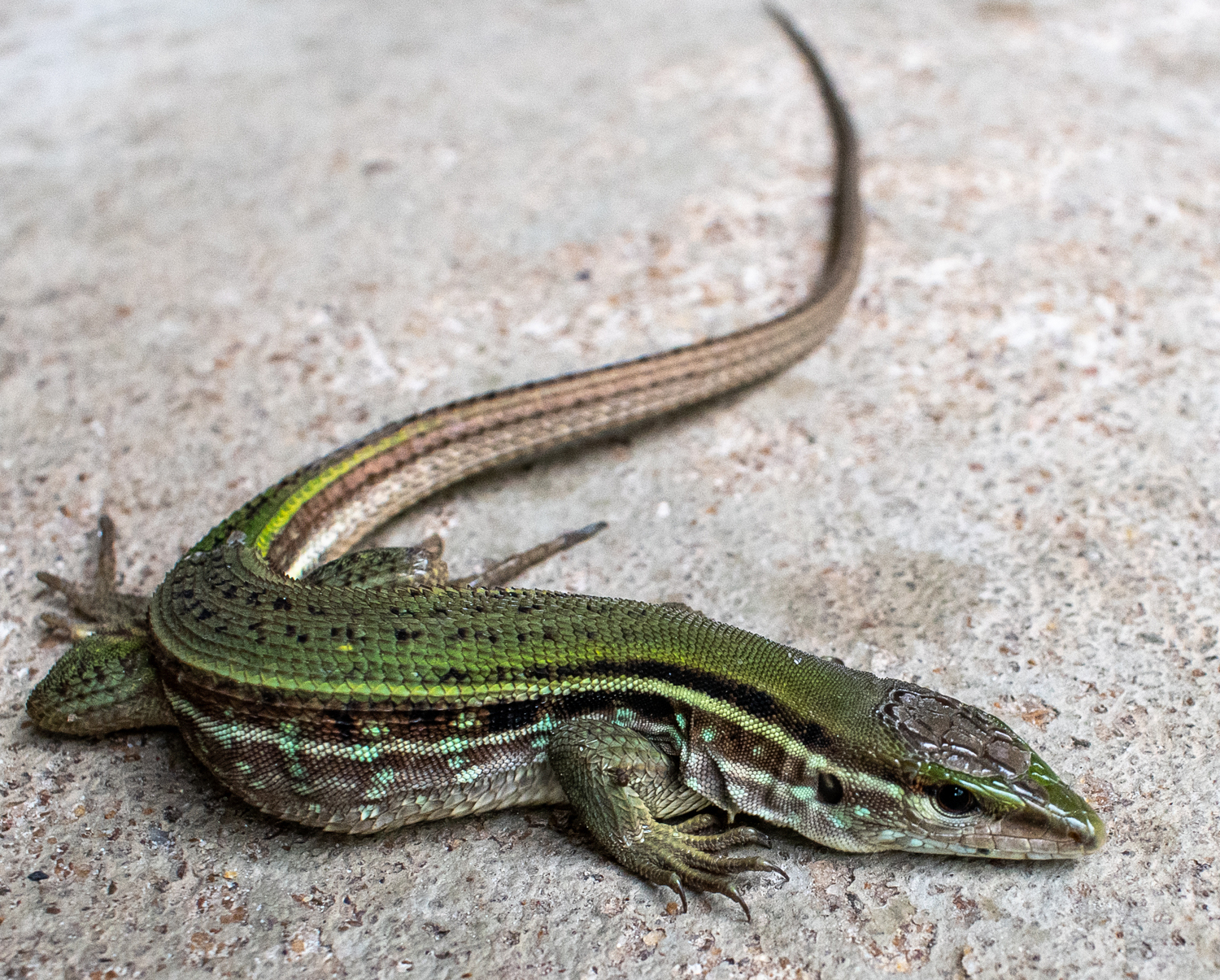

Conservation status
- Least Concern (IUCN 3.1)

Scientific classification
- Kingdom: Animalia
- Phylum: Chordata
- Class: Reptilia
- Order: Squamata
- Family: Teiidae
- Genus: Kentropyx
- Species: K. striata

Binomial name
- Kentropyx striata (Daudin, 1802)

Synonyms
- Lacerta striata Daudin, 1802; Centropyx striatus — A.M.C. Duméril & Bibron, 1839; Kentropyx striatus — J. Peters & Donoso-Barros, 1970; Kentropyx striata — Gallagher & Dixon, 1980

= Kentropyx striata =

Species of lizard

Kentropyx striata, known commonly as the striped whiptail, is a species of lizard in the family Teiidae. The species is endemic to northern South America.

== Geographic range ==
K. striata is found in Brazil, Colombia, French Guiana, Guyana, Suriname, Trinidad and Tobago, and Venezuela.

== Habitat ==
The natural habitats of K. striata are savanna and inland freshwater wetlands.

== Reproduction ==
K. striata is oviparous.
