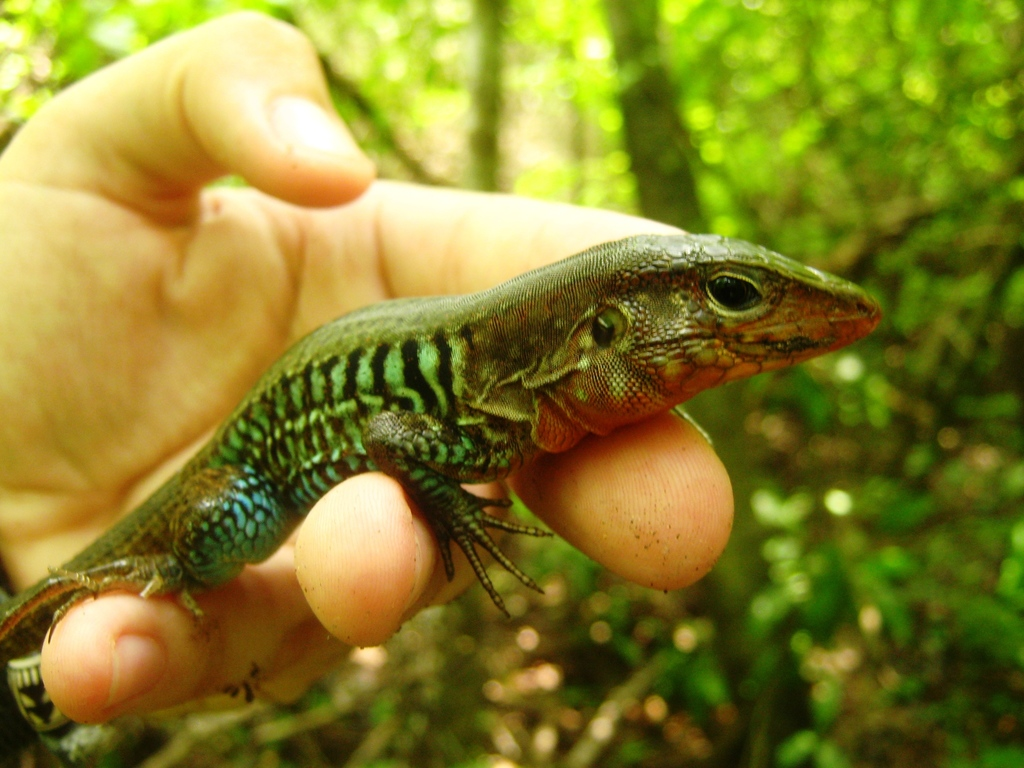

Scientific classification
- Kingdom: Animalia
- Phylum: Chordata
- Class: Reptilia
- Order: Squamata
- Family: Teiidae
- Genus: Holcosus
- Species: H. sinister

Binomial name
- Holcosus sinister (H.M. Smith & Laufe, 1946)

Synonyms
- Ameiva undulata sinistra H.M. Smith & Laufe, 1946; Holcosus undulatus sinister — Harvey et al., 2012; Holcosus sinister — Meza-Lázaro et al., 2015

= Holcosus sinister =

Species of lizard

Holcosus sinister, also known commonly as the rainbow ameiva, is a species of lizard in the family Teiidae. The species is endemic to Mexico.
