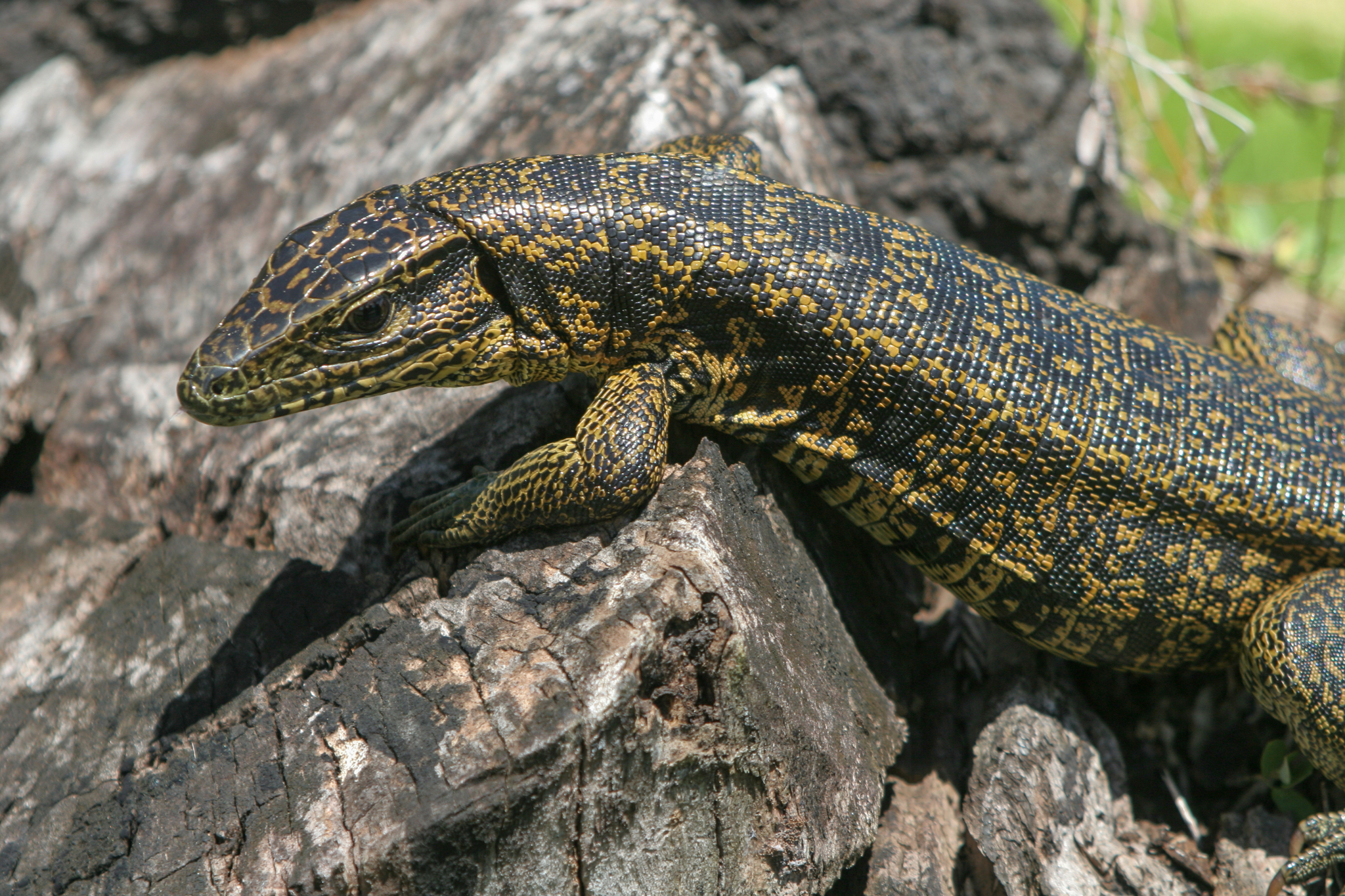
- Tupinambis teguixin

Scientific classification
- Domain: Eukaryota
- Kingdom: Animalia
- Phylum: Chordata
- Class: Reptilia
- Order: Squamata
- Superfamily: Lacertoidea
- Family: Teiidae; Gray, 1827

Genera
- 18, See text.

= Teiidae =

Teiidae Temporal range: Early Eocene–present

Family of lizards

Teiidae is a family of lacertoidean lizards native to the Americas. Members of this family are generally known as whiptails or racerunners; however, tegus also belong to this family. Teiidae is sister to the Gymnopthalmidae, and both families comprise the Teiioidea. The Teiidae includes several parthenogenic species – a mode of clonal reproduction. Presently, the Teiidae consists of approximately 150 species in eighteen genera.

== Morphology and behavior ==
Teiids can be distinguished from other lizards by the following characteristics: large rectangular scales that form distinct transverse rows ventrally and generally small granular scales dorsally, head scales that are separate from the skull bones, and teeth that are solid at the base and "glued" to the jaw bones. Additionally, all teiids have a forked, snake-like tongue. They all possess well-developed limbs.

Teiids are all terrestrial (few are semi-aquatic) and diurnal, and are primarily carnivorous or insectivorous. Most teiids forage quite actively within their ideal temperature range, quickly skirting between cover objects. Some will include a small amount of plant matter in their diet. They are oviparous, and some species lay very large clutches.

== Parthenogenesis ==
Several species of whiptail lizards are entirely female and no males are known. These all-female species reproduce by obligate parthenogenesis (obligate, because the lizards do not involve males and cannot reproduce sexually). Like all squamate obligate parthenogenetic lineages, parthenogenetic teiids are hybrids. Two or more species rarely hybridize and the offspring are thought to occasionally be capable of reproduction without sperm. The meiotic mechanism for bypassing fertilization is an ongoing area of research.

Primarily known from lab studies of parthenogenetic Aspidoscelis neomexicanus, simulated mating behavior can increase fertility. In this behavior known as pseudocopulation, one female assumes a male-like role and the other a female-like role. Individuals can switch roles throughout their life. The claim of pseudocopulation was initially met with hesitation by some researchers, and the behavior has not been observed in all parthenogenetic varieties. Since at least some all-female lineages exhibit pseudocopulation, these lizards can be considered to reproduce unisexually (in contrast to asexually).

== Fossil record ==
The closest relatives of the teiids appear to be the fossil Barbatteiidae from the Late Cretaceous of Europe. The earliest known crown-group teiid is the tupinambine Lumbrerasaurus from the Early Eocene of Argentina. Tupinambine teiids are known to have occurred in Europe during the Late Eocene based on fragmentary fossil material non-diagnostic to the genus level found in the Quercy Phosphorites Formation of France dating to the MP 17 zone. Their presence in Europe appears to have been brief and is highly unusual, given that tupinambines are otherwise restricted to the Americas. It has been postulated that a trans-Atlantic oceanic dispersal event may have allowed teiids to raft from South America to Africa, via which they temporarily colonized Europe.

The tupinambine genus Wautaugategu is known from the Middle Miocene of southern Georgia, USA; in the present day, the only tupinambines in the United States are introduced black-and-white tegu in Florida. This suggests that tupinambines must have naturally colonized North America from South America prior to the Great American Interchange, before eventually going extinct.

== Taxonomy ==
The Teiidae contains approximately 150 species divided into two subfamilies and 18 genera. This assessment includes several recent changes: three resurrected genera, five newly described genera, and the large genus Cnemidophorus split into Aspidoscelis and Cnemidophorus. In some technical literature, the Teiidae are referred to as macroteiids (in opposition to the microteiids, which are members of a sister family Gymnopthalmidae). Parthenogenetic lineages are generally referred to as species, though the concept of a species is meant loosely. Other terms include array, clone, type, or morph.

- Subfamily Teiinae:
  - Ameiva – junglerunners (14 species)
  - Ameivula – (11 species)
  - Aspidoscelis – North American whiptail lizards (46 species)
  - Aurivela – (2 species)
  - Cnemidophorus – South American whiptail lizards (19 species)
  - Contomastix – (6 species)
  - Dicrodon – desert tegus (3 species)
  - Glaucomastix – (5 species)
  - Holcosus – (18 species)
  - Kentropyx – (9 species)
  - Medopheos – (1 species)
  - Pholidoscelis – (20 species)
  - Teius – (3 species)
- Subfamily Tupinambinae:
  - Callopistes – false monitors (4 species)
  - Crocodilurus – the crocodile tegu (1 species)
  - Dracaena – caiman lizards (3 species)
  - Salvator – (3 species)
  - Tupinambis – tegus (8 species)
  - †Paradracaena Sullivan & Estes, 1997 (fossil; middle Miocene of Colombia, Peru & Brazil)
  - †Lumbrerasaurus Donadío, 1985 (fossil; early Eocene of Argentina)
  - †Wautaugategu Bourque & Stanley, 2025 (fossil; middle Miocene of Georgia, USA)
