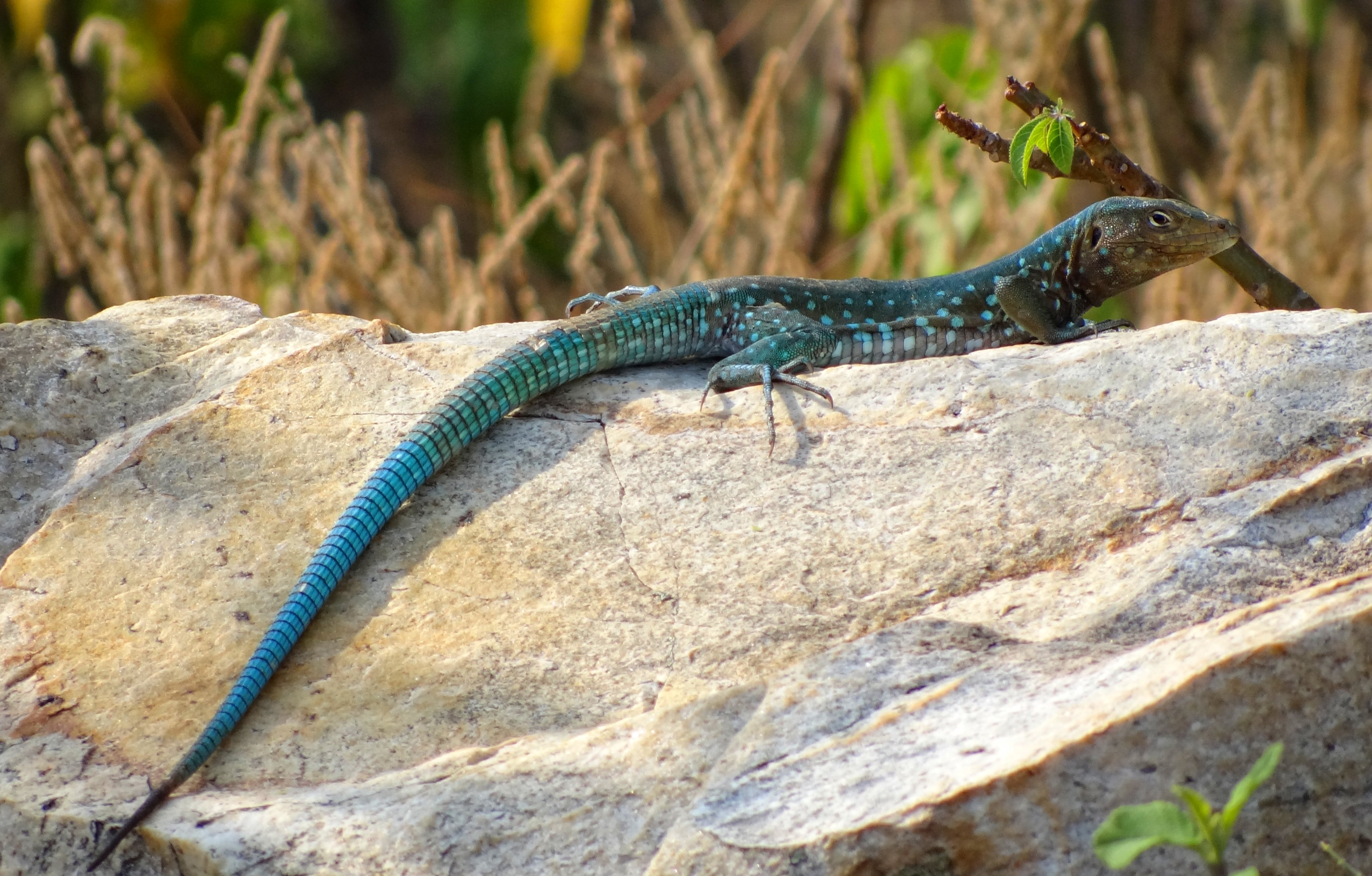
- male
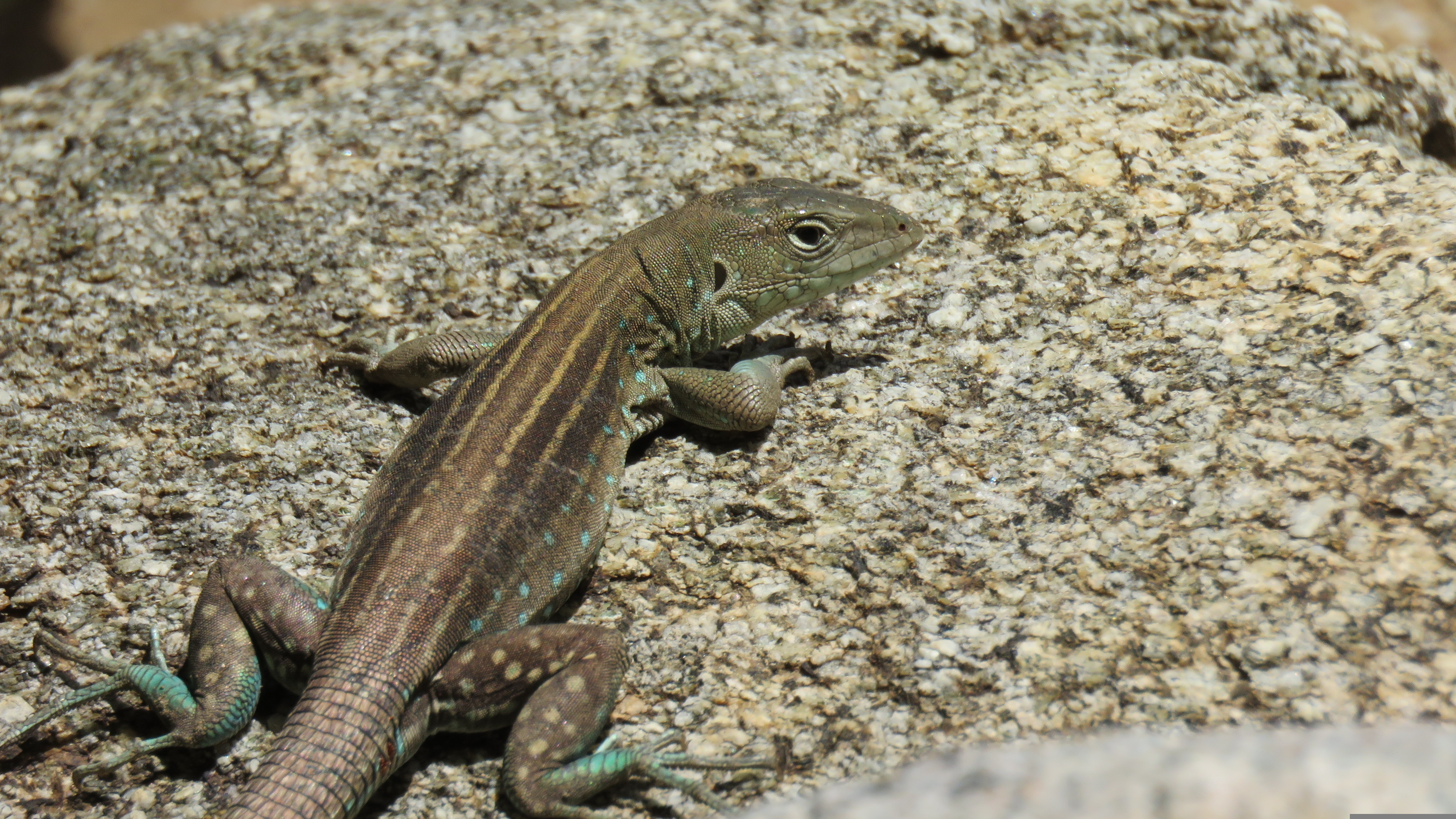
- female

Conservation status
- Least Concern (IUCN 3.1)

Scientific classification
- Kingdom: Animalia
- Phylum: Chordata
- Class: Reptilia
- Order: Squamata
- Family: Teiidae
- Genus: Cnemidophorus
- Species: C. arubensis

Binomial name
- Cnemidophorus arubensis van Lidth de Jeude, 1887

= Cnemidophorus arubensis =

Species of lizard

Cnemidophorus arubensis, commonly known as the Aruba whiptail or cododo, is a species of whiptail lizard in the genus Cnemidophorus. The female and young lizards are known as Lagadishi (English: Lizard), while the mature males are called Blòblò or Cododo (English: Blue-blue). This lizard species is endemic to the island of Aruba and is recognized as the most common and abundant species of lizard on the island.

== Identification ==
Female lizards and the young are varying shades of brown. Mature females display longitudinal bands on the upper part of their bodies, extending from the head to the tail. In addition, they exhibit blue eyespots on their sides and the hind limbs. C. arubensis typically grow to a length of approximately 15 centimetres (5.9 in)

Whiptails (Teiidae) possess femoral pores, although they are larger in males compared to females. Additionally, males have pre-anal pores.

== Diet ==
One of the notable adaptations observed within the Teiidae family of lizards is the transition to herbivorous diets in various endemic island species. This shift is particularly evident in the C. arubensis and C. murinus.

The diet of Aruba whiptails encompasses both insects and predominantly plant material such as flowers, nectar, leaves and fruits. However, they exhibit selectivity in their plant consumption due to the presence of toxins in many available plant species, particularly those containing relatively high quantities phenols, saponin, and alkaloids (such as quinine). Consequently, these lizards actively avoid such plants.

It has been observed that coprophagy, the consumption of feces, occurs in C. arubensis. The colon is larger than in other species of whiptails and is clearly adapted to a herbivorous diet. In a natural, undisturbed habitat, approximately 80% of the stomach contents consists of plant materials, while around 15% consists of insects and other anthropods. The remaining 5% consists materials such as feces, small stones and twigs.

They play a significant role in the dispersal of seeds for certain plant species. This is achieved by their consumption of fruits, followed by the excretion of the seeds in diverse locations, aiding in seed dispersal and contributing to the plant's reproductive cycle.

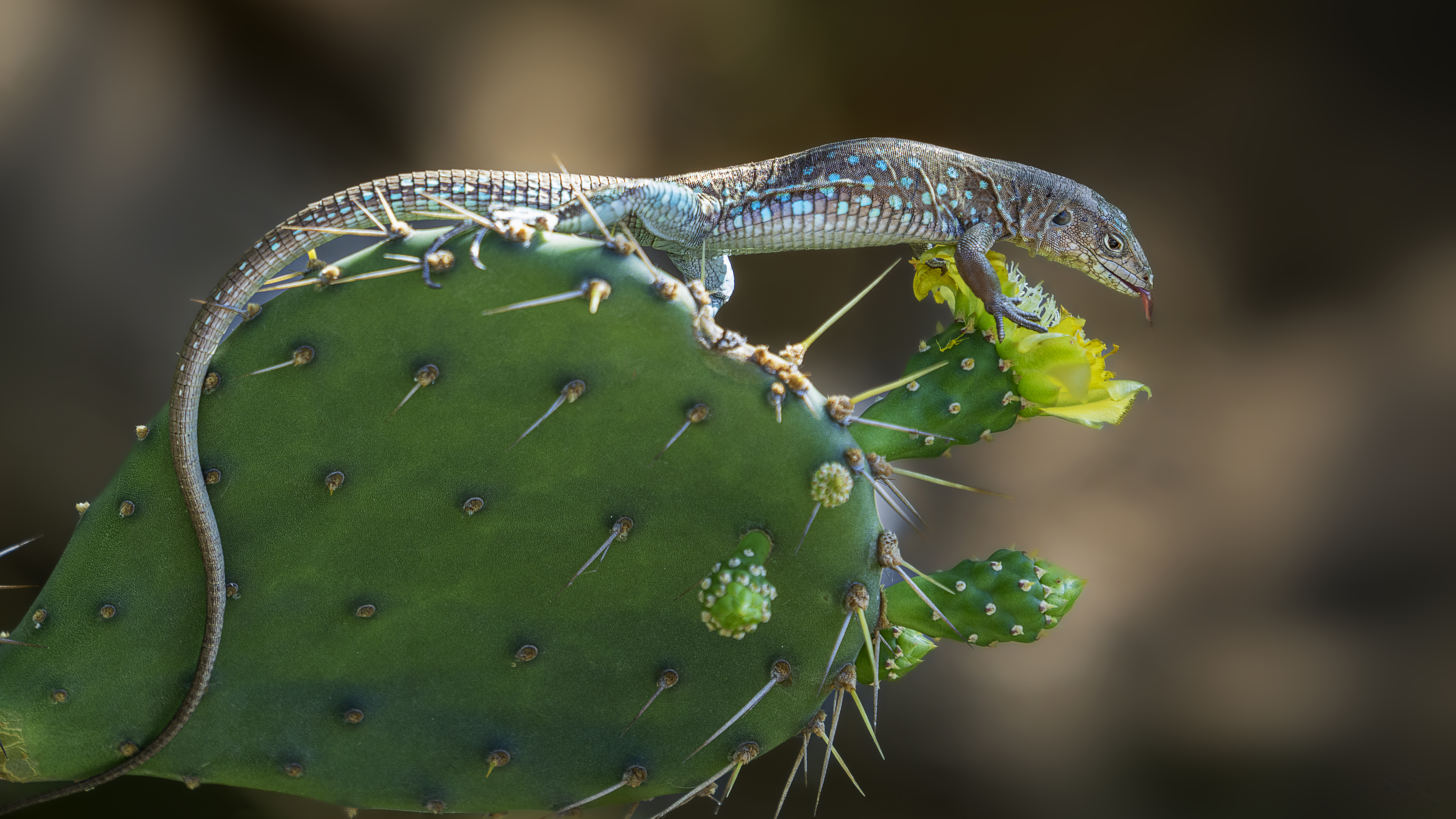
Aruba whiptail consuming nectar from a yellow flower of an Opuntia caracassana.

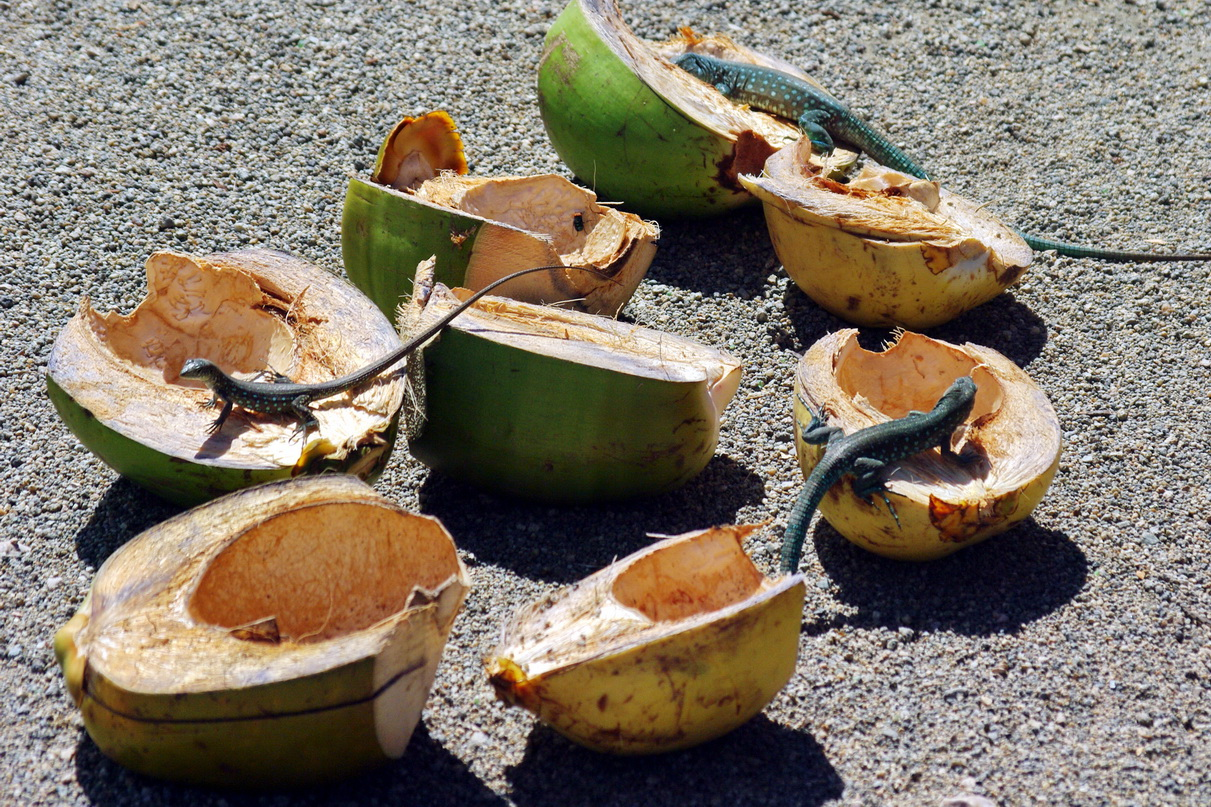
Aruba whiptail consuming split open coconuts

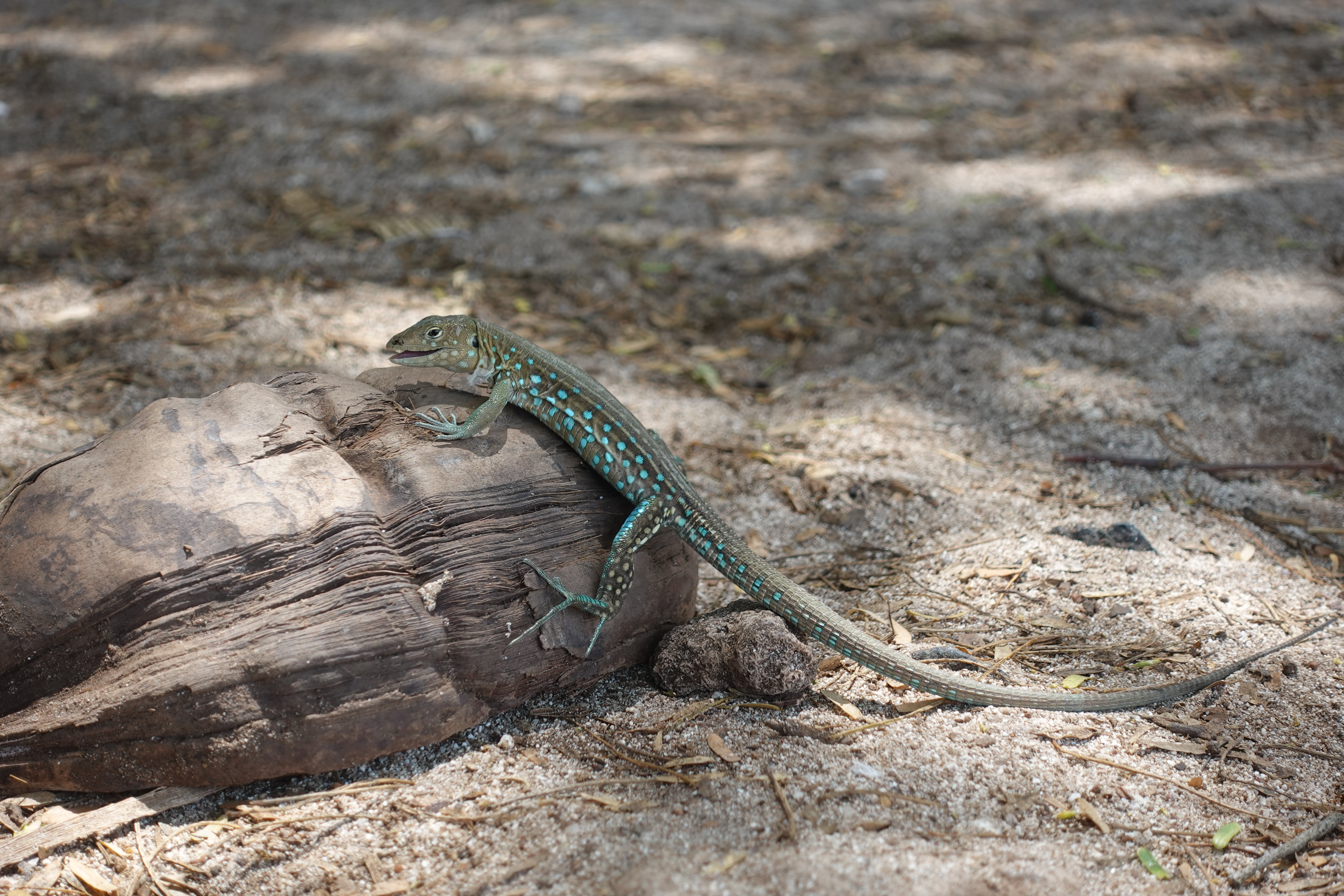
Aruban Whiptail resting on split coconut shells.

== Behavioral pattern ==
=== Reproductive behavior ===
In most Cnemidophorus lizards, the colors of dominant males tend to become somewhat more vibrant during the mating season. However, C. arubensis exhibits a distinct difference in this regard. During the mating season, which occurs from September to October, mature male C. arubensis lizards undergo a transformation. They become intensely blue, and this light-blue color covers a significant portion of the body.

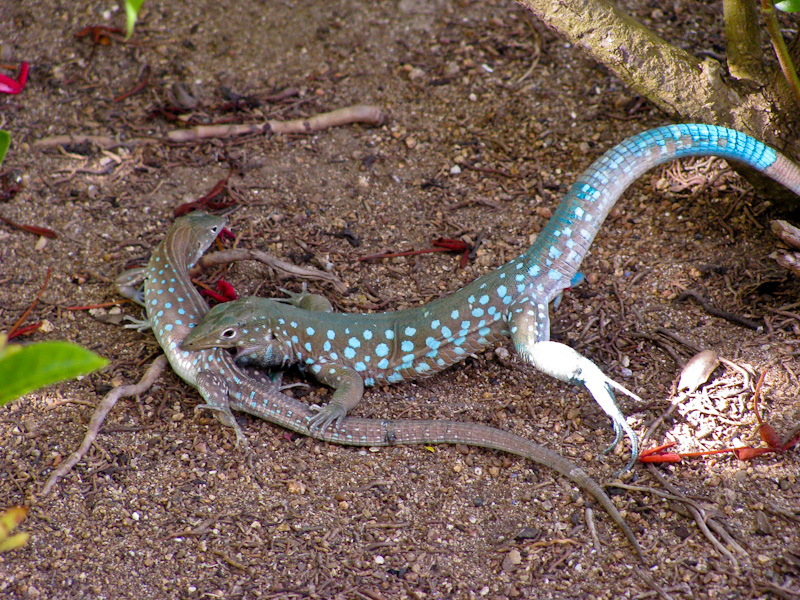
Copulation between female and male Aruban whiptails

All teiines are oviparous, and clutch size is associated with lizard body size. While Cnemidophorus has clutches ranging from two to six eggs, C. arubensis, produces a single egg, albeit a large one.

=== Front paw signaling ===
Frequent signaling with the front paw is a notable behavior in C. arubensis and can also be observed in C. lemniscatus lemniscatus. In C. murinus murinus and C. murinus ruthveni, this behavior appears to be somewhat less frequent.

=== Tongue flicks ===
Both C. arubensis and C. murinus display an increased likelihood of tongue-flicking (briefly extruding the tip of their bifurcated tongue for approximately 100 milliseconds) in the presence of quinine compared to its absence. The lizards appear to detect quinine even before closely approaching the bait.

== Sources ==
- Buurt, G. van (2005). Fieldguide to the Amphibians and Reptiles of Aruba, Curaçao and Bonaire. Edition Chimaira. ISBN 9783930612666.
- Cooper Jr., William E.; Pérez-Mellado, Valentín; Vitt, L.J.; Budzinsky, Brandy (2002). "Behavioral responses to plant toxins by two omnivorous lizard species". Physiology & Behavior. 76 (2): 297–303. doi:10.1016/S0031-9384(02)00715-1. PMID 12044603. S2CID 11880625.
- King, G.M. (1996). Reptiles and Herbivory. Springer Netherlands. ISBN 9780412461101.
- Notes from the Leyden Museum. Netherlands: Rijksmuseum van Natuurlijke Historie te Leiden. 1887.
- Pianka, E.R.; Vitt, L.J. (2003). Lizards:Windows to the evolution of diversity. United Kingdom: University of California Press. ISBN 9780520248472.
- Schall, Joseph J. (1974). "Population Structure of the Aruban Whiptail Lizard, Cnemidophorus arubensis, in Varied Habitats". Herpetologica. 30 (1): 38–44. JSTOR 3891411.
- Schall, Joseph J. (1990). "Aversion of Whiptail Lizards (Cnemidophorus) to a Model Alkaloid". Herpetologica. 46 (1): 34–39. JSTOR 3892600.
- Vitt, L.J.; Zug, G.R.; Caldwell, J.P. (2001). Herpetology:An Introductory Biology of Amphibians and Reptiles. Elsevier. ISBN 9780080549408.
