= Cnemidophorus pseudolemniscatus =

Conservation status
- Least Concern (IUCN 3.1)

Scientific classification
- Kingdom: Animalia
- Phylum: Chordata
- Class: Reptilia
- Order: Squamata
- Suborder: Lacertoidea
- Family: Teiidae
- Genus: Cnemidophorus
- Species: C. pseudolemniscatus

Binomial name
- Cnemidophorus pseudolemniscatus Cole & Dessauer, 1993

Species of lizard

Cnemidophorus pseudolemniscatus, Coles' racerunner, is a species of teiid lizard found in Suriname and French Guiana.
