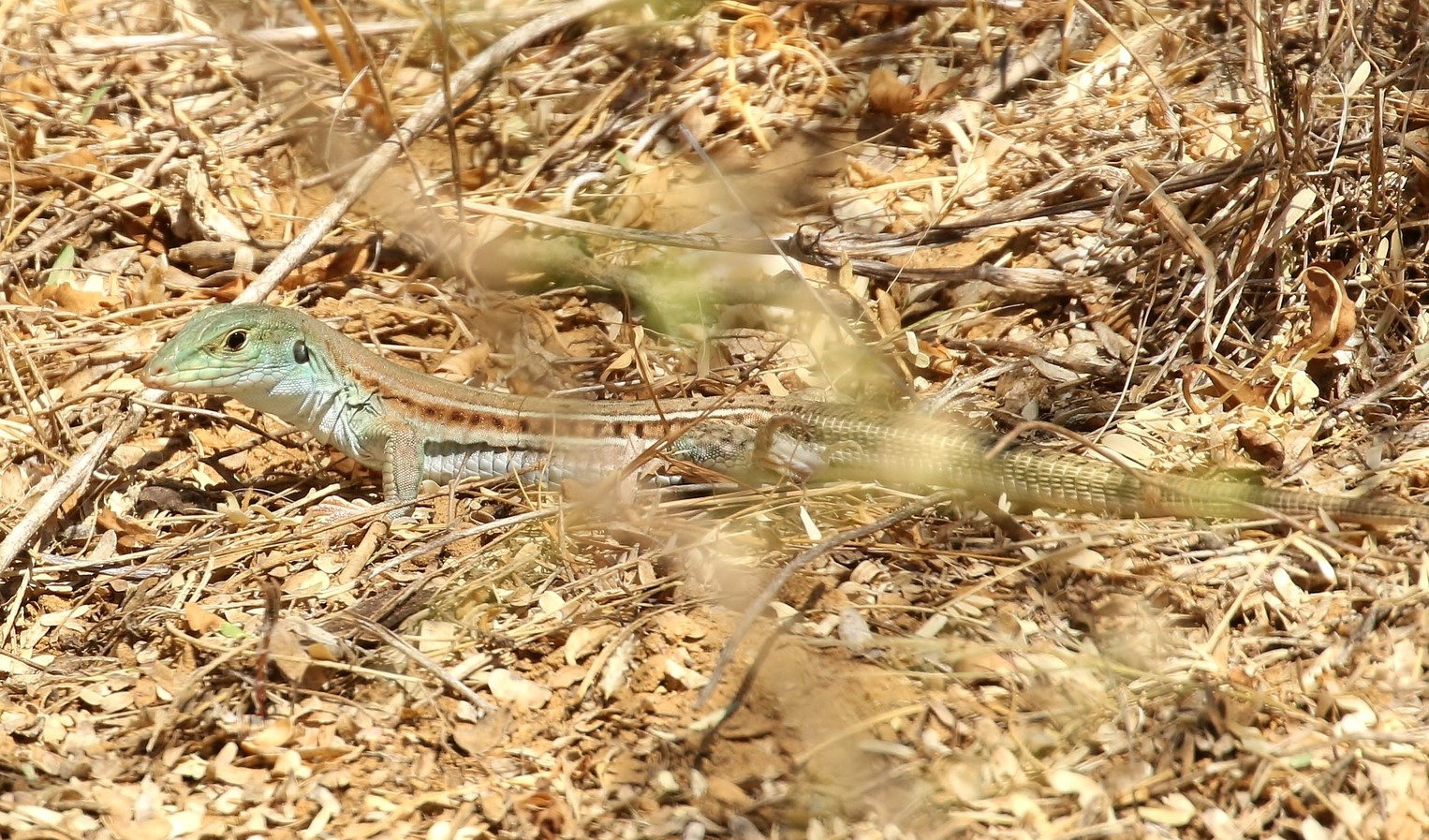

Conservation status
- Least Concern (IUCN 3.1)

Scientific classification
- Kingdom: Animalia
- Phylum: Chordata
- Class: Reptilia
- Order: Squamata
- Suborder: Lacertoidea
- Family: Teiidae
- Genus: Cnemidophorus
- Species: C. arenivagus

Binomial name
- Cnemidophorus arenivagus Markezich, Cole, & Dessauer, 1997

= Cnemidophorus arenivagus =

Species of lizard

Cnemidophorus arenivagus is a species of teiid lizard found in Venezuela.
