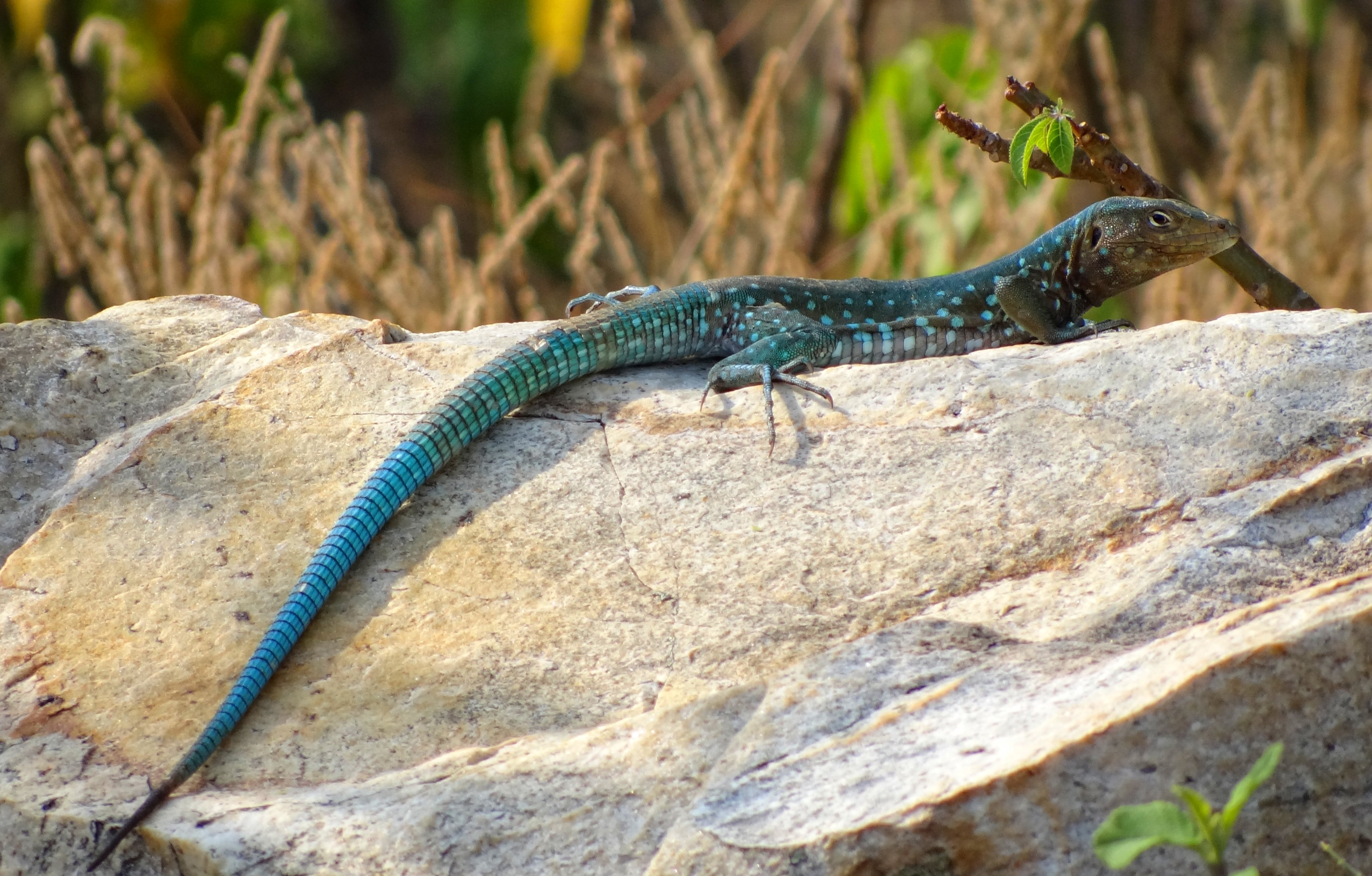
- Aruban whiptail Cnemidophorus arubensis

Scientific classification
- Kingdom: Animalia
- Phylum: Chordata
- Class: Reptilia
- Order: Squamata
- Family: Teiidae
- Subfamily: Teiinae
- Genus: Cnemidophorus; Wagler, 1830

Type species
- Seps murinus Laurenti, 1768

= Cnemidophorus =

Genus of lizards

Cnemidophorus is a genus of lizards in the family Teiidae. Species in the genus Cnemidophorus are commonly referred to as whiptail lizards or racerunners. The genus is native to South America, Central America, and the West Indies.

== Taxonomy ==
Reeder et al. (2002) re-examined the nomenclature for the genus Cnemidophorus (sensu lato) and split it into the two genera Aspidoscelis and Cnemidophorus (sensu stricto). A further split by Harvey et al. (2012) added the genera Ameivula and Contomastix.

== Etymology ==
The name Cnemidophorus literally means "greave-wearing", from the Ancient Greek knēmido- (combining form of knēmis, "greave", a leg armor) and -phoros ("bearer").

== Reproduction ==
In some of the Cnemidophorus species, there are no males, and they reproduce through parthenogenesis. This is well known in bees and aphids, but is very rare in vertebrates. Those species without males are now known to originate through hybridization, or interspecific breeding. Occasionally, a mating between a female of one species and a male of another produces a parthenogen, a female that is able to produce viable eggs that are genetically identical to her own cells. The lizards that hatch from these eggs are thus also parthenogens that can again produce identical eggs, resulting in an asexual, clonal population. Parthenogenetic species resulting from a single hybridization are diploid (that is, they have two sets of chromosomes just as sexual species do), but sometimes these females mate with other males, producing offspring which are triploid (that is, they have three sets of chromosomes, or 50% more than equivalent sexual species; see polyploidy). Over 30% of the genus Cnemidophorus are parthenogenic.

== Species ==
The genus Cnemidophorus (sensu stricto) contains the following species which are recognized as being valid.

- Cnemidophorus arenivagus Markezich, Cole & Dessauer, 1997
- Cnemidophorus arubensis Lidth de Jeude, 1887 – Aruba whiptail
- Cnemidophorus cryptus Cole & Dessauer, 1993 – cryptic racerunner
- Cnemidophorus duellmani McCranie & Hedges, 2013
- Cnemidophorus espeuti Boulenger, 1885
- Cnemidophorus flavissimus Ugueto, Harvey & G. Rivas, 2010
- Cnemidophorus gaigei Ruthven, 1915 – Gaige's rainbow lizard
- Cnemidophorus gramivagus McCrystal & Dixon, 1987
- Cnemidophorus lemniscatus (Linnaeus, 1758) – rainbow whiptail
- Cnemidophorus leucopsammus Ugueto & Harvey, 2010
- Cnemidophorus murinus (Laurenti, 1768) – Laurent's whiptail
- Cnemidophorus nigricolor W. Peters, 1873
- Cnemidophorus pseudolemniscatus Cole & Dessauer, 1993 – Cole's racerunner
- Cnemidophorus rostralis Ugueto & Harvey, 2010
- Cnemidophorus ruatanus Barbour, 1928
- Cnemidophorus ruthveni Burt, 1935
- Cnemidophorus senectus Ugueto, Harvey & G. Rivas, 2010
- Cnemidophorus splendidus Markezich, Cole & Dessauer, 1997 – blue rainbow lizard
- Cnemidophorus vanzoi (Baskin & E. Williams, 1966) – Saint Lucia whiptail, Vanzo's whiptail

Nota bene: A binomial authority in parentheses indicates that the species was originally described in a genus other than Cnemidophorus.

== See also ==
- Aspidoscelis
- Darevskia, another lizard genus containing several parthenogenic species.
