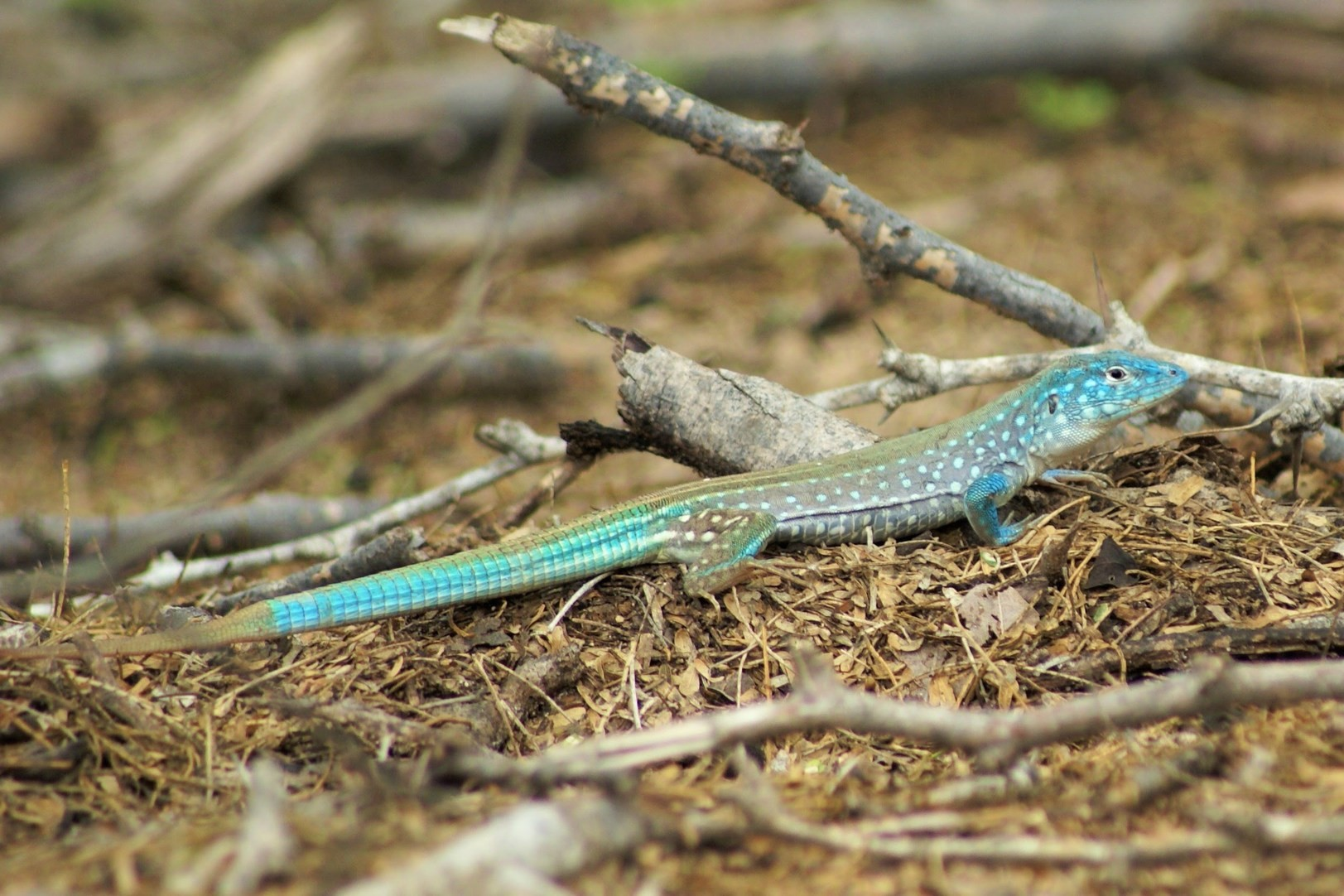

Scientific classification
- Kingdom: Animalia
- Phylum: Chordata
- Class: Reptilia
- Order: Squamata
- Family: Teiidae
- Genus: Cnemidophorus
- Species: C. splendidus

Binomial name
- Cnemidophorus splendidus (Markezich, Cole, & Dessauer, 1997)

= Cnemidophorus splendidus =

Species of lizard

Cnemidophorus splendidus, the blue rainbow lizard, is a species of teiid lizard found in Venezuela.
