= Cnemidophorus cryptus =

Scientific classification
- Kingdom: Animalia
- Phylum: Chordata
- Class: Reptilia
- Order: Squamata
- Family: Teiidae
- Genus: Cnemidophorus
- Species: C. cryptus

Binomial name
- Cnemidophorus cryptus Cole & Dessauer, 1993

Species of lizard

Cnemidophorus cryptus, the cryptic racerunner, is a species of teiid lizard found in Venezuela, Brazil, Suriname, and French Guiana.
