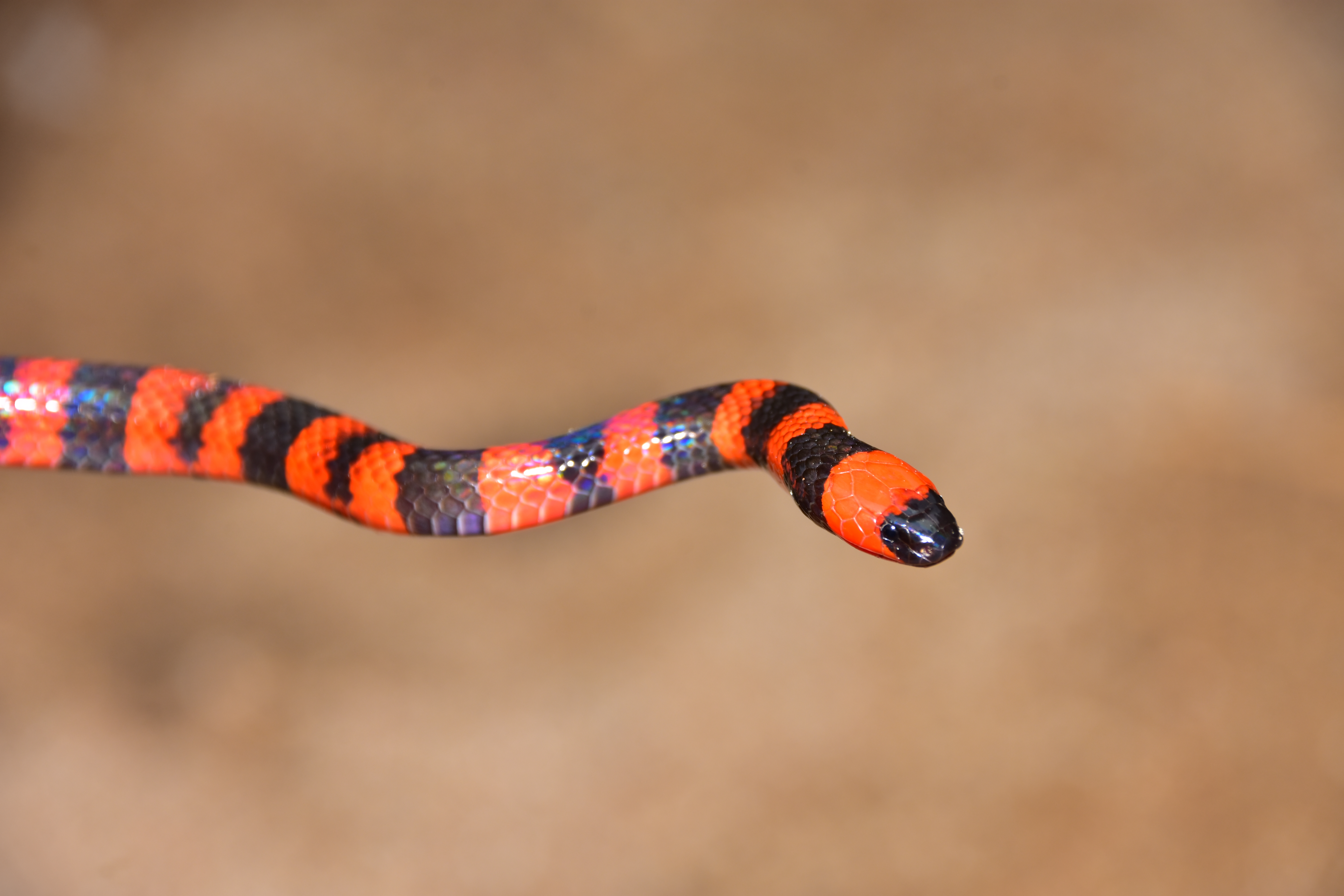

Conservation status
- Critically Endangered (IUCN 3.1)

Scientific classification
- Kingdom: Animalia
- Phylum: Chordata
- Order: Squamata
- Suborder: Serpentes
- Family: Elapidae
- Genus: Micrurus
- Species: M. ruatanus

Binomial name
- Micrurus ruatanus (Günther, 1895)
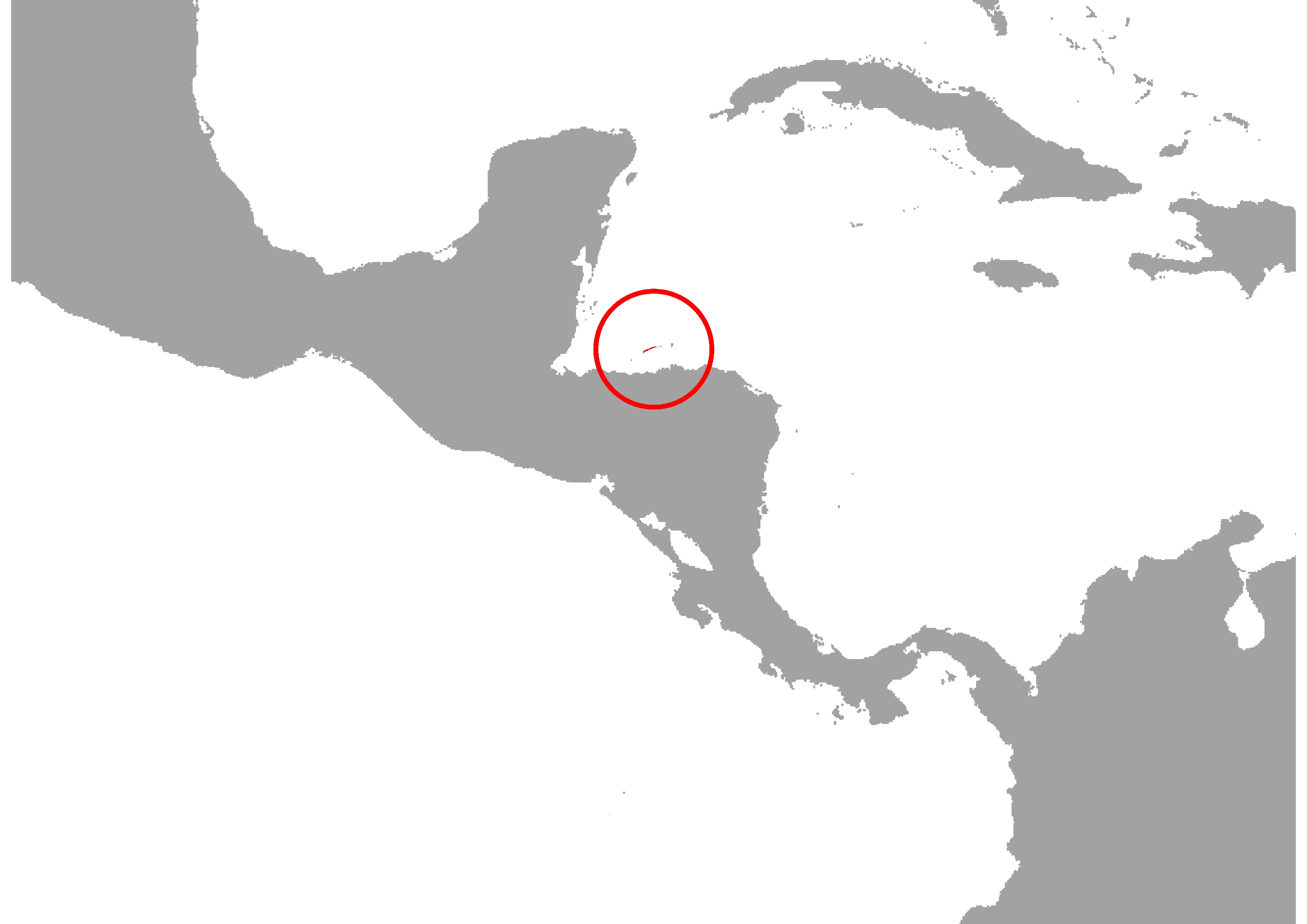

Synonyms
- Elaps ruatanus Günther, 1895; Micrurus nigrocinctus ruatanus (Günther, 1895)

= Roatan coral snake =

Species of snake

The Roatán coral snake (Micrurus ruatanus), also known commonly as coral de la Isla de Roatán or coral roatanense in Spanish, and babaspul in the local dialect, is a critically endangered species of venomous snake in the family Elapidae. The species is endemic to the island of Roatán, one of the Bay Islands off the coast of Honduras. There are no subspecies that are recognized as being valid.

== Description ==
Micrurus ruatanus is a bicolored New World coral snake. Its color pattern consists of alternating wide and narrow black rings, which are separated by red rings. The wide black rings are 3 dorsal scales wide, and the narrow black rings are 1–2 dorsals wide.

Sexual dimorphism exists in both coloration and scalation. Males have 33–39 black rings on the body, and females have 41–45. Males have 178–188 ventrals and 46–48 subcaudals, and females have 193–203 ventrals and 34–38 subcaudals.

Medium-sized for the genus Micrurus, adults usually have a total length (tail included) of 45–60 cm (18–24 in). The maximum recorded total length is 68 cm (27 in).

== Habitat ==
The preferred natural habitat of Micrurus roatanensis is forest, at elevations from near sea level to 20 m (66 ft).

== Behavior ==
Micrurus ruatanus is terrestrial and semi-fossorial.

== Diet ==
Micrurus ruatanus is known to prey on the lizard Cnemidophorus ruatanus.

== Reproduction ==
Micrurus ruatanus is oviparous.
