= Cnemidophorus senectus =

Conservation status
- Least Concern (IUCN 3.1)

Scientific classification
- Kingdom: Animalia
- Phylum: Chordata
- Class: Reptilia
- Order: Squamata
- Family: Teiidae
- Genus: Cnemidophorus
- Species: C. senectus

Binomial name
- Cnemidophorus senectus Ugueto, Harvey, & Rivas, 2010

Species of lizard

Cnemidophorus senectus is a species of teiid lizard endemic to Venezuela.
