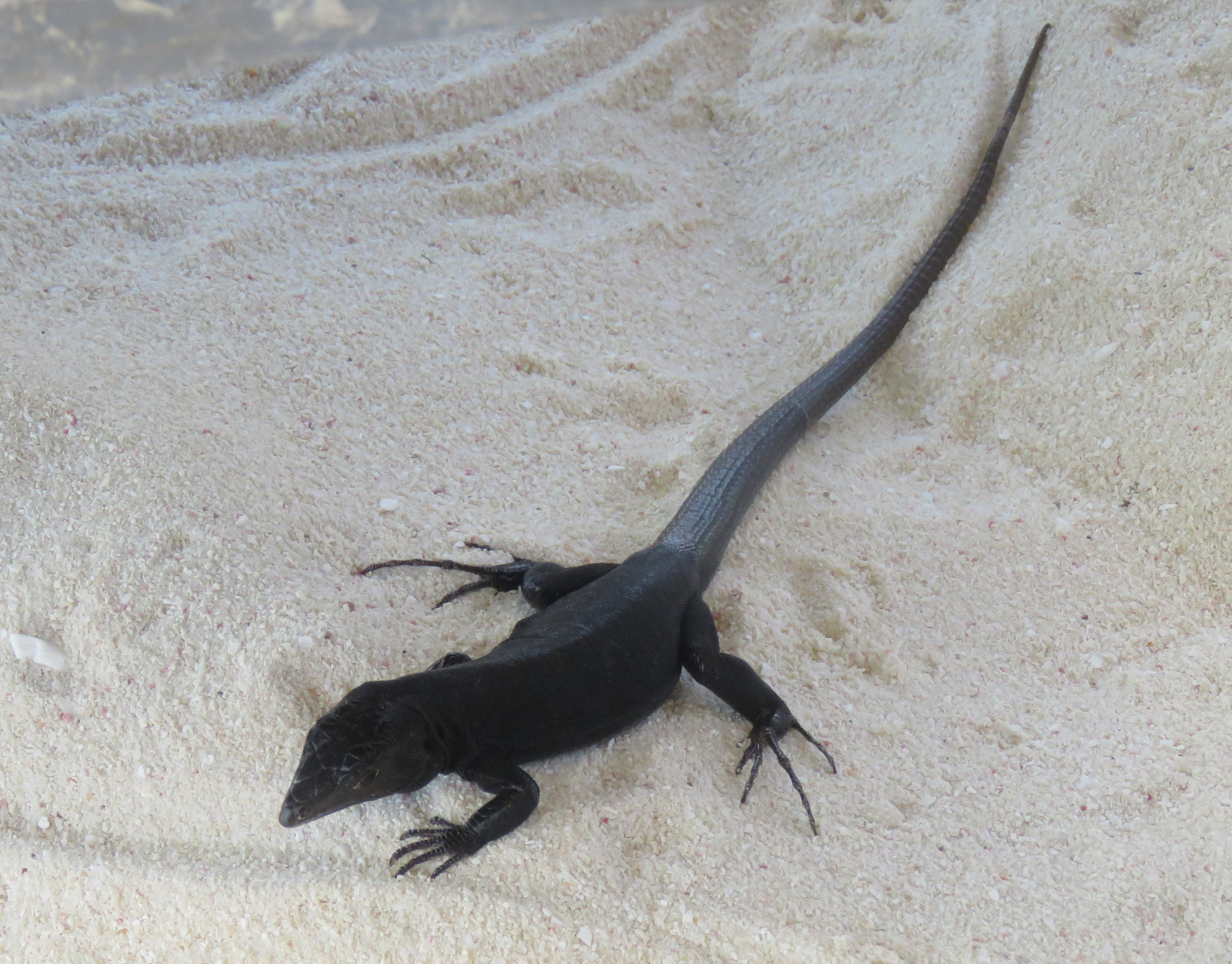

Conservation status
- Least Concern (IUCN 3.1)

Scientific classification
- Kingdom: Animalia
- Phylum: Chordata
- Class: Reptilia
- Order: Squamata
- Family: Teiidae
- Genus: Cnemidophorus
- Species: C. nigricolor

Binomial name
- Cnemidophorus nigricolor Peters, 1873

= Cnemidophorus nigricolor =

Species of lizard

Cnemidophorus nigricolor is a species of teiid lizard endemic to Venezuela.
