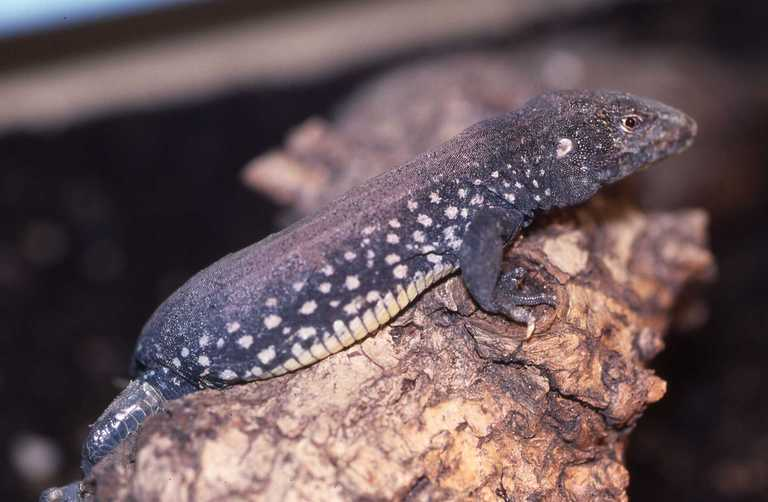
- St. Lucia whiptail in captivity

Conservation status
- Critically Endangered (IUCN 3.1)

Scientific classification
- Kingdom: Animalia
- Phylum: Chordata
- Class: Reptilia
- Order: Squamata
- Family: Teiidae
- Genus: Cnemidophorus
- Species: C. vanzoi

Binomial name
- Cnemidophorus vanzoi (Baskin & E.E. Williams, 1966)

Synonyms
- Ameiva vanzoi Baskin & E.E. Williams, 1966; Cnemidophorus vanzoi — Presch, 1971

= Saint Lucia whiptail =

Species of lizard

The Saint Lucia whiptail (Cnemidophorus vanzoi), also known commonly as the Maria Islands whiptail, the Saint Lucian whiptail, and Vanzo's whiptail, is a species of lizard in the family Teiidae. The species is indigenous to the Caribbean.

== Geographic range ==
C. vanzoi is endemic to Saint Lucia, where it has been extirpated from the main island and is now only native to the small islets of Maria Major and Maria Minor, with fewer than 1,000 individuals estimated. A third population has been established on nearby Praslin Island through translocation.

== Habitat ==
The preferred natural habitats of C. vanzoi are forest and shrubland.

== Reproduction ==
C. vanzoi is oviparous.

== Etymology ==
The specific name, vanzoi, is in honor of Brazilian herpetologist Paulo Vanzolini.
