= Cnemidophorus rostralis =

Scientific classification
- Kingdom: Animalia
- Phylum: Chordata
- Class: Reptilia
- Order: Squamata
- Family: Teiidae
- Genus: Cnemidophorus
- Species: C. rostralis

Binomial name
- Cnemidophorus rostralis Ugueto & Harvey, 2010

Species of lizard

Cnemidophorus rostralis is a species of teiid lizard endemic to La Tortuga Island in Venezuela.
