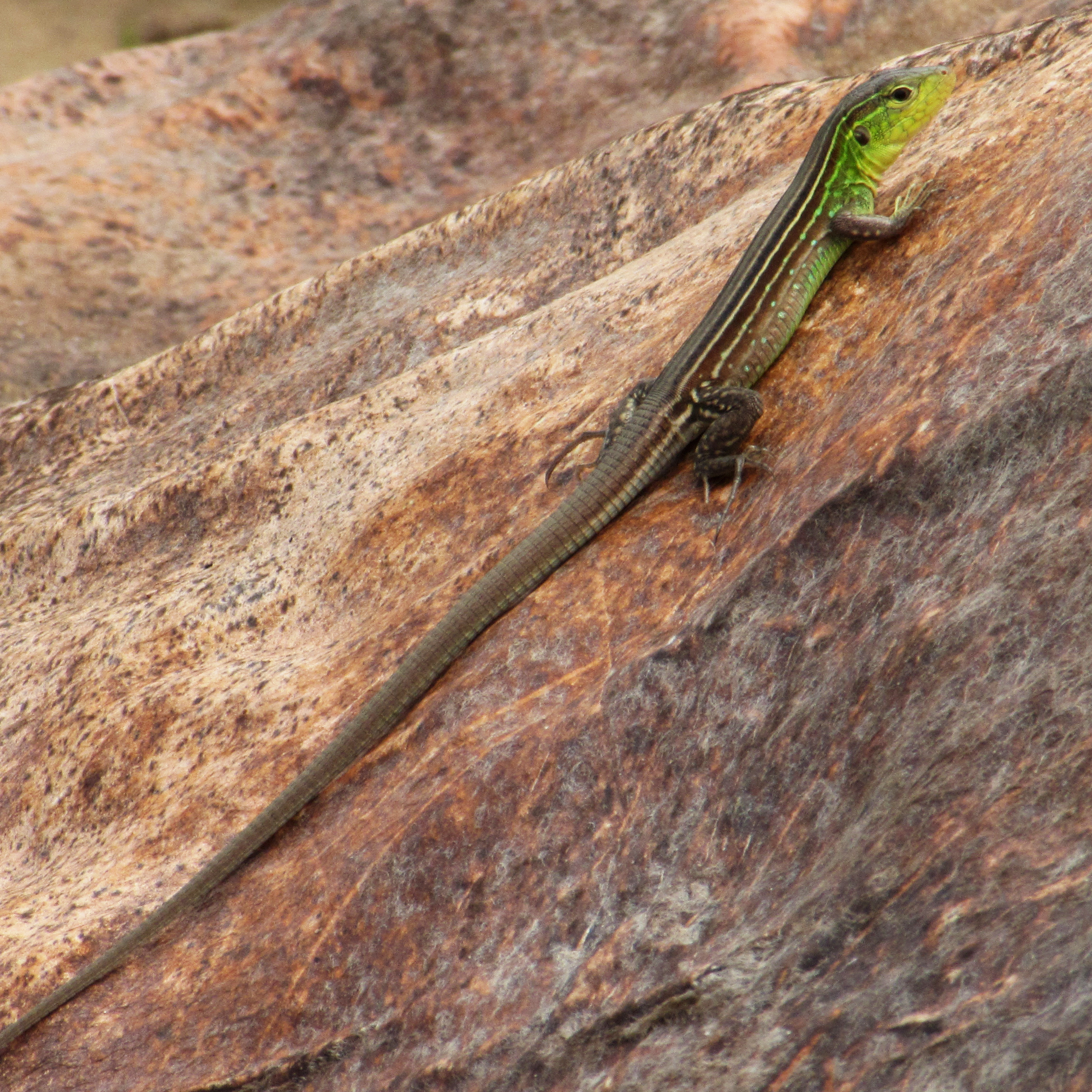

Conservation status
- Least Concern (IUCN 3.1)

Scientific classification
- Kingdom: Animalia
- Phylum: Chordata
- Class: Reptilia
- Order: Squamata
- Suborder: Lacertoidea
- Family: Teiidae
- Genus: Cnemidophorus
- Species: C. gramivagus

Binomial name
- Cnemidophorus gramivagus McCrystal & Dixon, 1987

= Cnemidophorus gramivagus =

Species of lizard

Cnemidophorus gramivagus is a species of teiid lizard found in Venezuela, Colombia, and Brazil.
