= Cnemidophorus leucopsammus =

Conservation status
- Least Concern (IUCN 3.1)

Scientific classification
- Kingdom: Animalia
- Phylum: Chordata
- Class: Reptilia
- Order: Squamata
- Suborder: Lacertoidea
- Family: Teiidae
- Genus: Cnemidophorus
- Species: C. leucopsammus

Binomial name
- Cnemidophorus leucopsammus Ugueto & Harvey, 2010

Species of lizard

Cnemidophorus leucopsammus is a species of teiid lizard endemic to Blanquilla Island in Venezuela.
