= Ameiva pantherina =

Conservation status
- Data Deficient (IUCN 3.1)

Scientific classification
- Kingdom: Animalia
- Phylum: Chordata
- Class: Reptilia
- Order: Squamata
- Family: Teiidae
- Genus: Ameiva
- Species: A. pantherina

Binomial name
- Ameiva pantherina Ugueto & Harvey, 2011

Species of lizard

Ameiva pantherina is a species of teiid lizard endemic to Venezuela.
