= Gabriel Ugueto =

Venezuelan-American herpetologist and paleoartist

Gabriel N. Ugueto
- Born: May 29, 1976 (age 50); Venezuela
- Known for: Herpetology, Paleoart, scientific illustration
- Scientific career
- Fields: Herpetology, Paleoart, Scientific illustration

Gabriel N. Ugueto (born 29 May 1976) is a Venezuelan-American herpetologist, paleoartist and scientific illustrator.

== Biography ==
Select paleoart by Ugueto
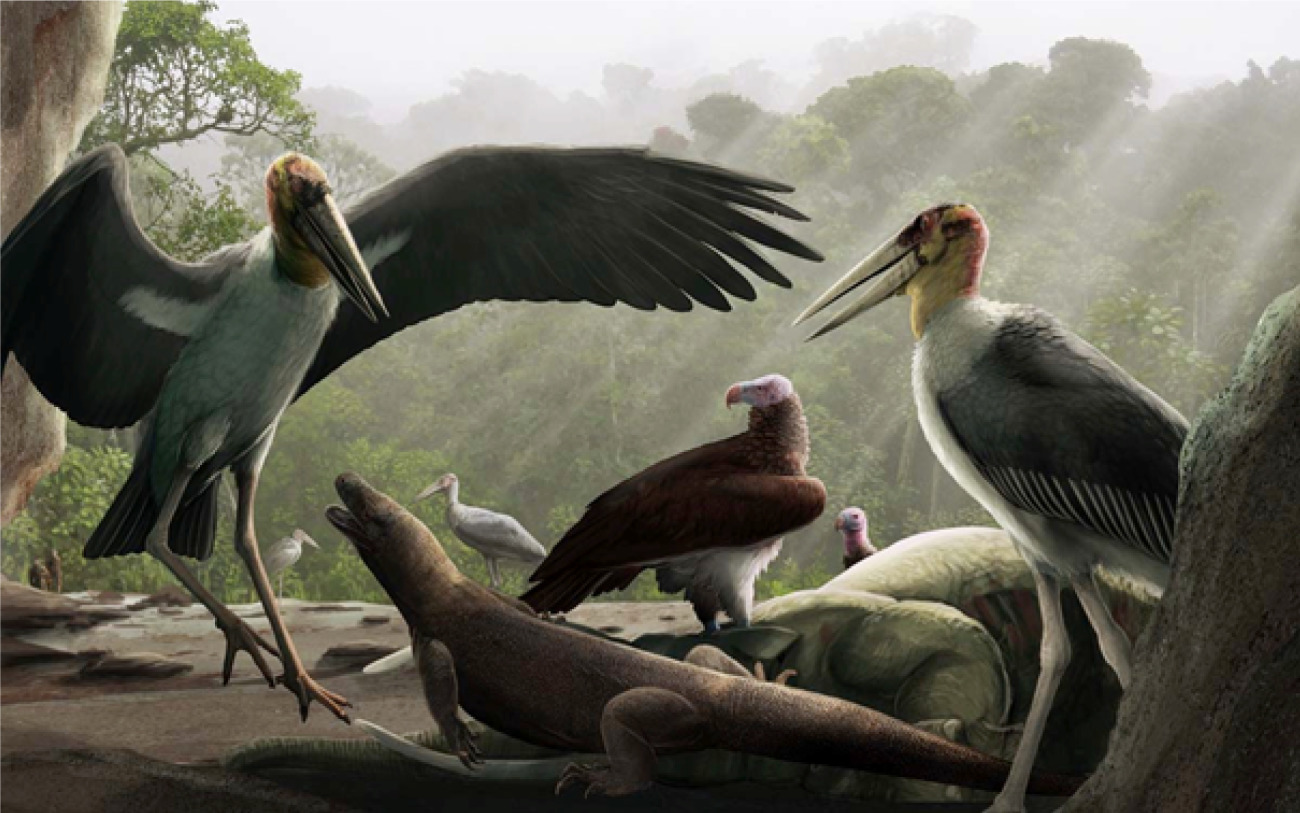
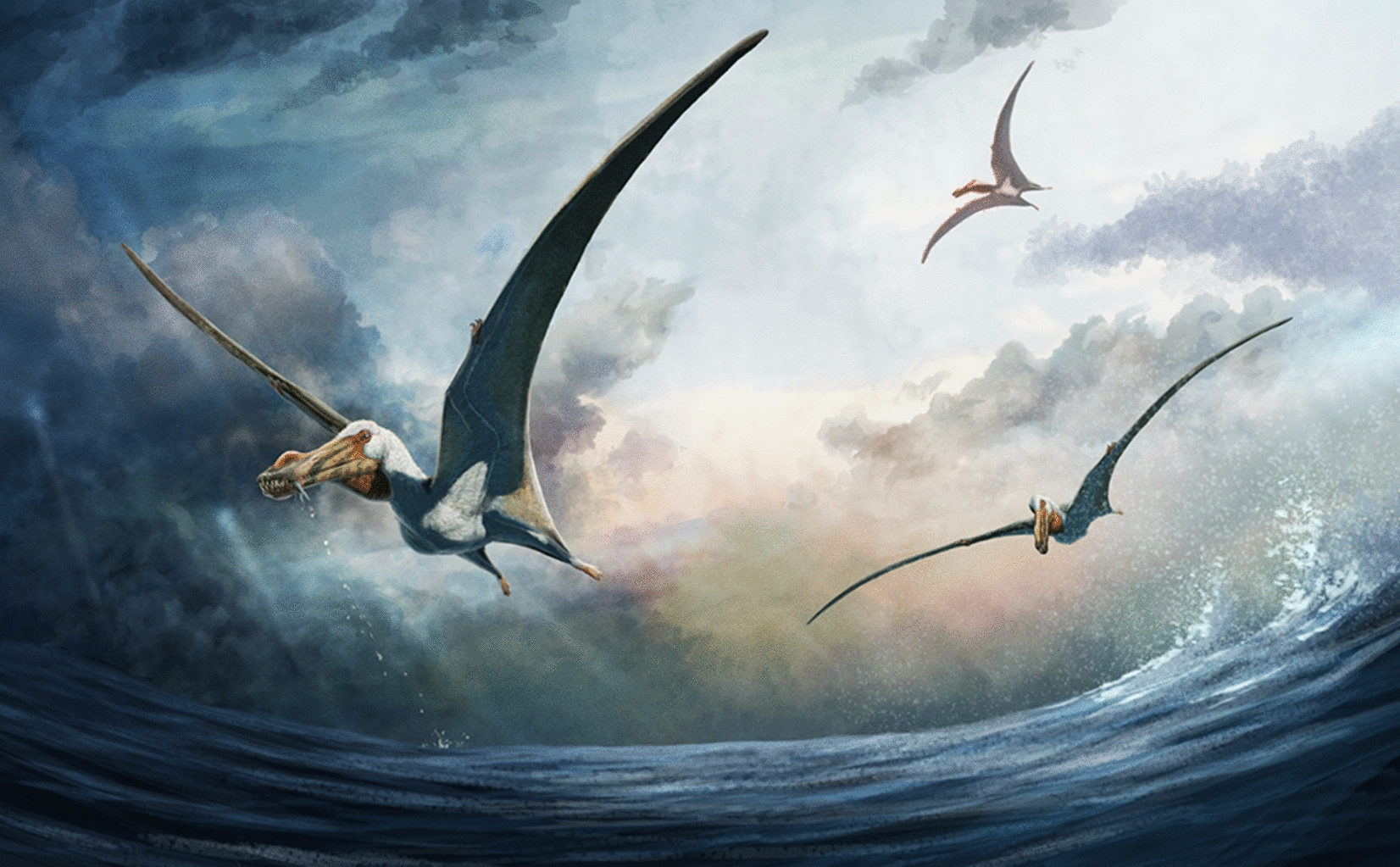
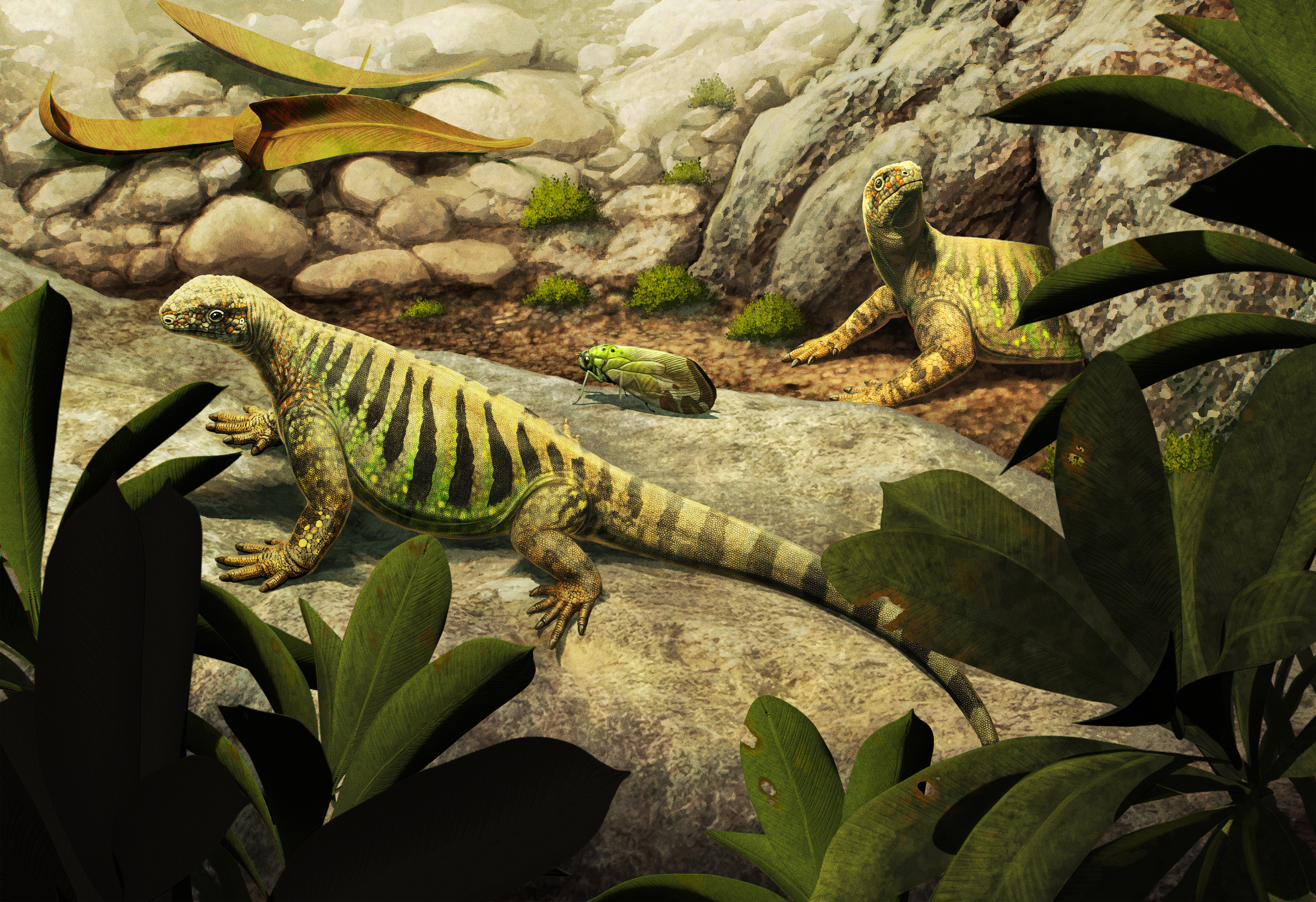
Clockwise from top left: giant marabou stork (Leptoptilos robustus) confronting a komodo dragon, Haliskia, Dinodontosaurus isiyavamanda, and Eunotosaurus

Ugueto was fascinated by amphibians and reptiles from an early age. He studied graphic design and illustration, and in the early 2000s he moved from Caracas to Miami, Florida. Ugueto worked for several years as an independent herpetological researcher. While studying South American herpetofauna, particularly whiptails (Teiidae), he described several new neotropical species and published numerous scientific articles.

In 2010 he published the book Amphibians and Reptiles of Margarita, Coche and Cubagua. In 2011, in collaboration with other authors including Philippe J. R. Kok, he co-authored the monograph Reptiles of Venezuela: an updated and commented checklist, published in Zootaxa.

Later, Ugueto began his career as a scientific illustrator. His passion for extinct animals led him to paleoart. His work reflects recent hypotheses on the appearance and behavior of dinosaurs and other prehistoric animals, for which he produces accurate reconstructions. He illustrated eight books of the Extinct series by Ben Garrod and contributed as a concept artist to the documentary series Prehistoric Planet (2022 and 2023) on Apple TV+. In 2018, he worked as an animator for the episode The Real T. rex of the documentary series The Nature of Things.

His illustrations have appeared in various journals and magazines, including National Geographic and BBC Science Focus Magazine. In 2024 he created a life reconstruction of Ichthyotitan, the largest ichthyosaur discovered to date.

Today, Ugueto mainly works digitally, though he originally worked with traditional media such as watercolor, oil, colored pencil, and ink.

== Species described ==
- Ameiva pantherina (Ugueto & Harvey, 2011)
- Ameivula (Harvey, Ugueto & Gutberlet Jr., 2012)
- Anolis anatoloros (Ugueto, Rivas, Barros, Sánchez-Pacheco & García-Pérez, 2007)
- Aurivela (Harvey, Ugueto & Gutberlet Jr., 2012)
- Cnemidophorus flavissimus (Ugueto, Harvey & Rivas, 2010)
- Callopistinae (Harvey, Ugueto & Gutberlet Jr., 2012)
- Cnemidophorus leucopsammus (Ugueto & Harvey, 2010)
- Cnemidophorus rostralis (Ugueto & Harvey, 2010)
- Cnemidophorus senectus (Ugueto, Harvey & Rivas, 2010)
- Contomastix (Harvey, Ugueto & Gutberlet Jr., 2012)
- Gonatodes naufragus (Rivas, Ugueto, Schargel, Barros, Velozo & Sánchez, 2013)
- Medopheos (Harvey, Ugueto & Gutberlet Jr., 2012)

== Works illustrated ==
- Ben Garrod: So You Think You Know About: Triceratops?, 2018
- Ben Garrod: So You Think You Know About: Tyrannosaurus Rex?, 2018
- Ben Garrod: So You Think You Know About: Velociraptor?, 2018
- Alejandra Ortiz Medrano: Dinosaurios Bebés, 2019
- Ben Garrod: Extinct the Story of Life on Earth: Hallucigenia, 2021
- Ben Garrod: Extinct the Story of Life on Earth: Trilobite, 2021
- Ben Garrod: Extinct the Story of Life on Earth: Lisowicia, 2021
- Ben Garrod: Extinct the Story of Life on Earth: Tyrannosaurus rex, 2021
- Ben Garrod: Extinct the Story of Life on Earth: Dunkleosteus, 2022
- Ben Garrod: Extinct the Story of Life on Earth: Hainan Gibbon, 2022
- Ben Garrod: Extinct the Story of Life on Earth: Megalodon, 2022
- Ben Garrod: Extinct the Story of Life on Earth: Thylacine, 2022
- Ben Garrod: Microraptor (Ultimate Dinosaurs), 2023
- Ben Garrod: Velociraptor (Ultimate Dinosaurs), 2023
- Ben Garrod: Stegosaurus (Ultimate Dinosaurs), 2023
- Ben Garrod: Ankylosaurus (Ultimate Dinosaurs), 2023
- Ben Garrod: Triceratops (Ultimate Dinosaurs), 2023
- Elizabeth A. Nesbitt & David B. Williams: Spirit Whales and Sloth Tales, 2023
- David Hone: Uncovering Dinosaur Behavior: What They Did and How We Know, 2024
