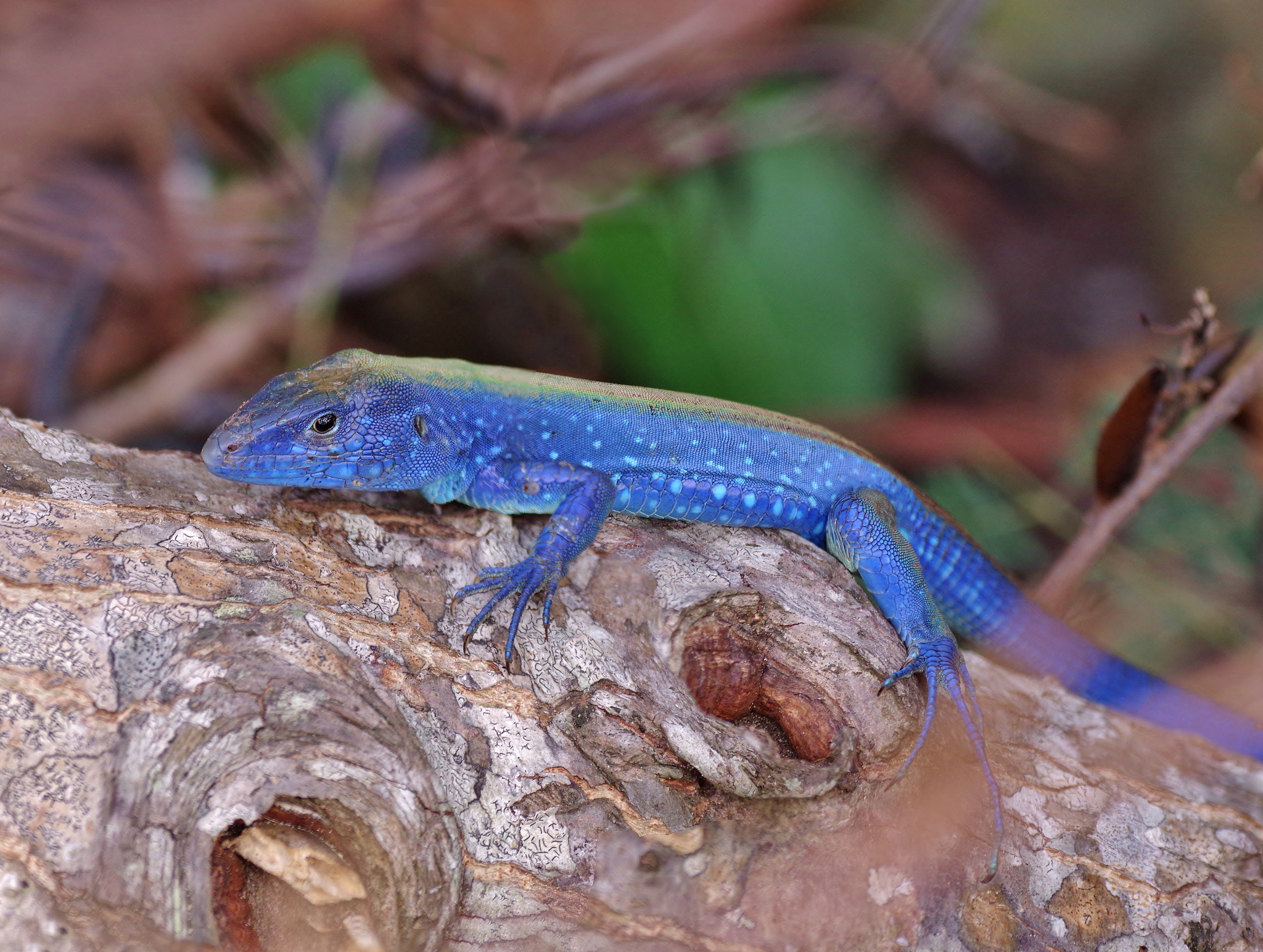

Scientific classification
- Domain: Eukaryota
- Kingdom: Animalia
- Phylum: Chordata
- Class: Reptilia
- Order: Squamata
- Family: Teiidae
- Genus: Cnemidophorus
- Species: C. espeuti

Binomial name
- Cnemidophorus espeuti (Boulenger, 1885)

= Cnemidophorus espeuti =

Species of lizard

Cnemidophorus espeuti is a species of teiid lizard found on Isla de Providencia and San Andrés in Colombia.
