= Anolis anatoloros =

Conservation status
- Least Concern (IUCN 3.1)

Scientific classification
- Kingdom: Animalia
- Phylum: Chordata
- Class: Reptilia
- Order: Squamata
- Suborder: Iguania
- Family: Anolidae
- Genus: Anolis
- Species: A. anatoloros

Binomial name
- Anolis anatoloros Ugueto, Rivas, Barros, Sanchez-Pacheco, & Garcia-Perez, 2007

Species of lizard

Anolis anatoloros is a species of lizard in the family Dactyloidae. The species is found in Venezuela.
