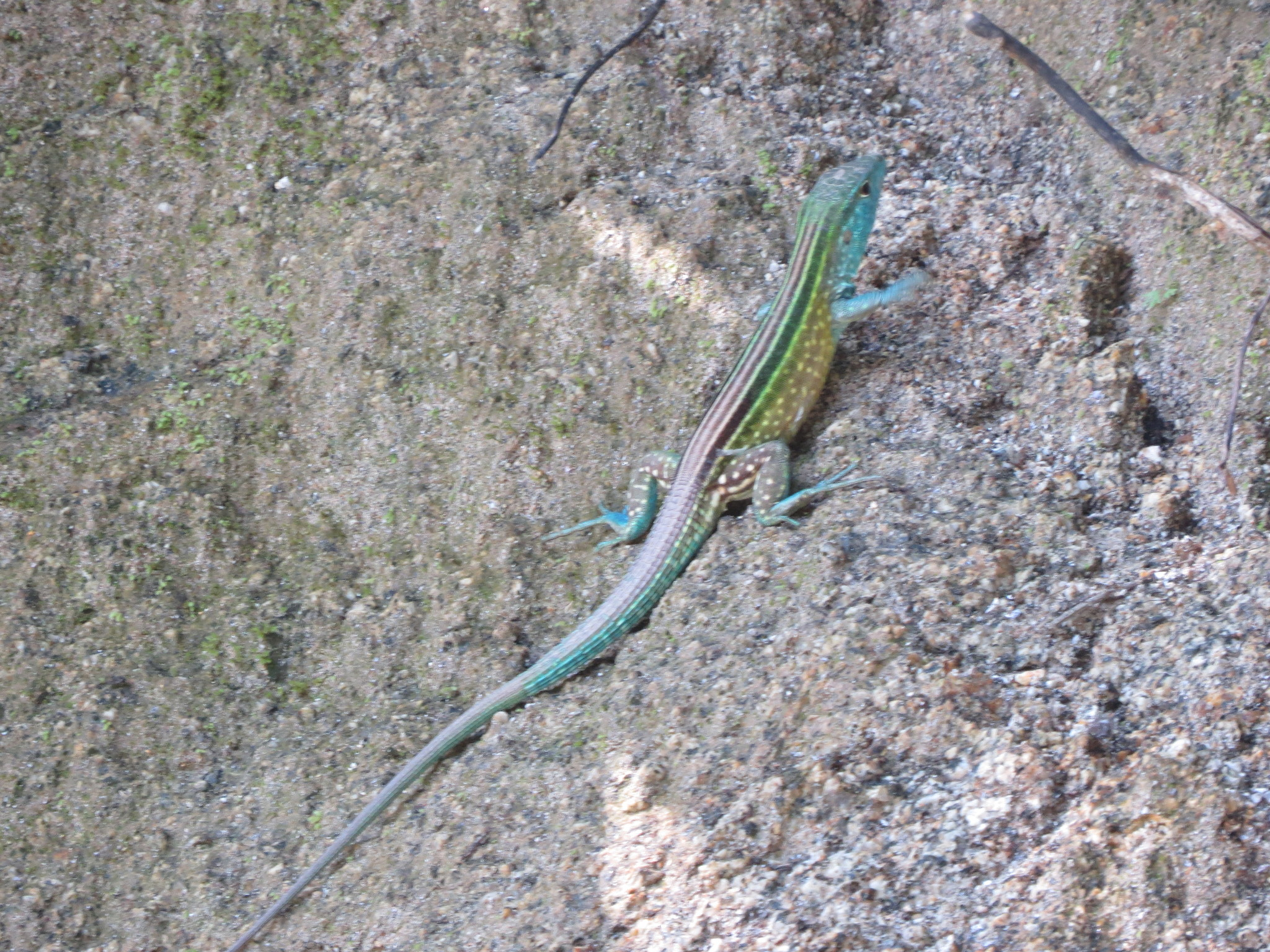

Scientific classification
- Domain: Eukaryota
- Kingdom: Animalia
- Phylum: Chordata
- Class: Reptilia
- Order: Squamata
- Family: Teiidae
- Genus: Cnemidophorus
- Species: C. gaigei

Binomial name
- Cnemidophorus gaigei Ruthven, 1915

= Cnemidophorus gaigei =

Species of reptile

Cnemidophorus gaigei, commonly known as Gaige's rainbow lizard, is a species of teiid lizard endemic to Colombia.
