= Cnemidophorus flavissimus =

Conservation status
- Near Threatened (IUCN 3.1)

Scientific classification
- Kingdom: Animalia
- Phylum: Chordata
- Class: Reptilia
- Order: Squamata
- Family: Teiidae
- Genus: Cnemidophorus
- Species: C. flavissimus

Binomial name
- Cnemidophorus flavissimus Ugueto, Harvey, & Rivas, 2010

Species of lizard

Cnemidophorus flavissimus is a species of teiid lizard found on Islas Los Frailes in Venezuela.
