= Cnemidophorus duellmani =

Scientific classification
- Domain: Eukaryota
- Kingdom: Animalia
- Phylum: Chordata
- Class: Reptilia
- Order: Squamata
- Family: Teiidae
- Genus: Cnemidophorus
- Species: C. duellmani

Binomial name
- Cnemidophorus duellmani McCranie & Hedges, 2013

Species of lizard

Cnemidophorus duellmani is a species of teiid lizard endemic to Panama.
