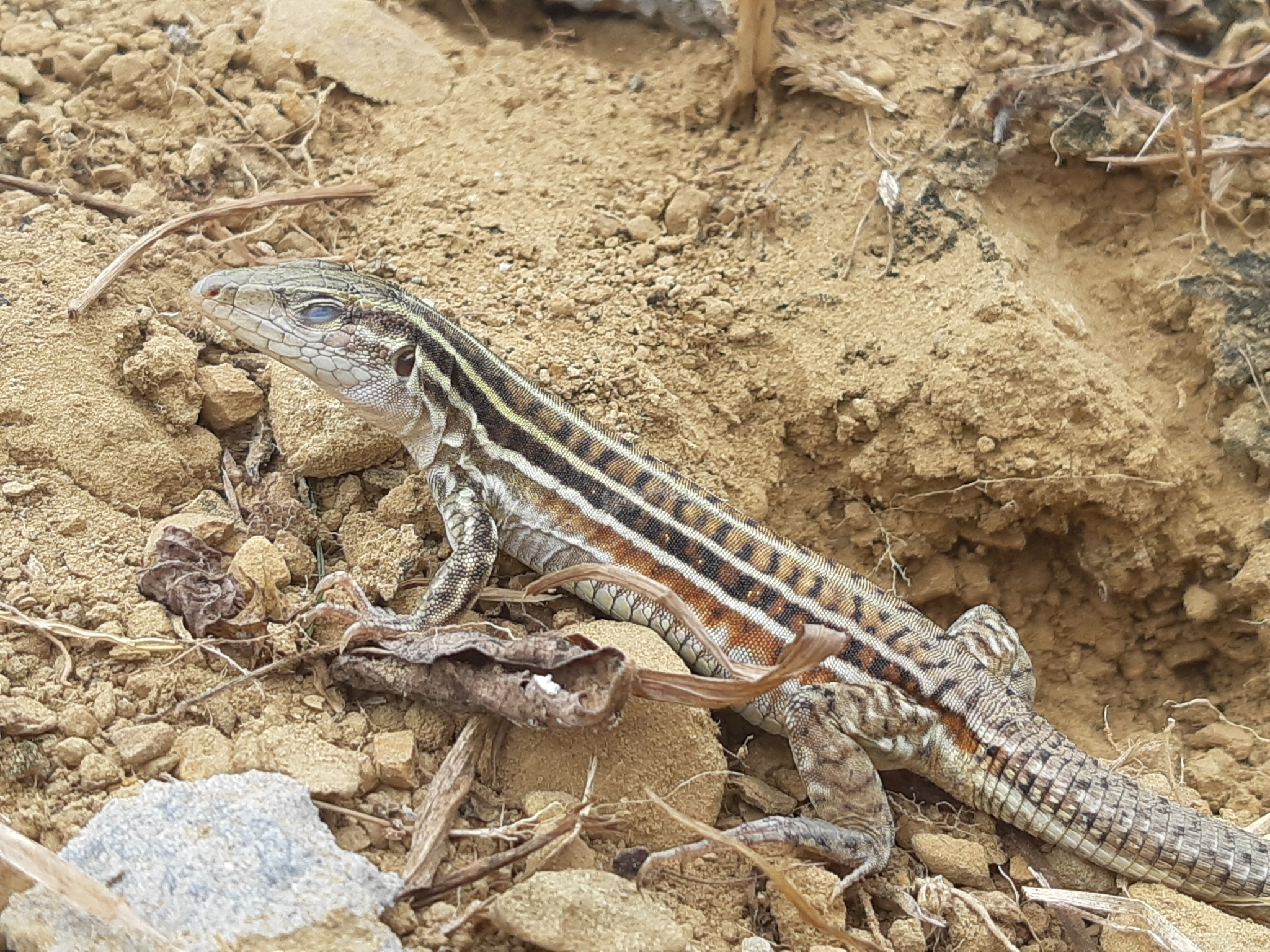

Conservation status
- Least Concern (IUCN 3.1)

Scientific classification
- Kingdom: Animalia
- Phylum: Chordata
- Class: Reptilia
- Order: Squamata
- Family: Teiidae
- Genus: Medopheos; Harvey, Ugueto & Gutberlet, 2012
- Species: M. edracanthus

Binomial name
- Medopheos edracanthus (Bocourt, 1874)

Synonyms
- Ameiva edracantha Bocourt, 1870; Cnemidophorus armatulus Cope, 1875; Medopheos edracantha (Bocourt, 1870); Verticaria hedracantha [sic] (Bocourt, 1870)

= Bocourt's ameiva =

Species of lizard

Bocourt's ameiva (Medopheos edracanthus) is a species of lizard in the family Teiidae. The species is native to northwestern South America. It is the only species in the genus Medopheos.

== Geographic range ==
M. edracanthus is found in Ecuador and Peru.

== Habitat ==
M. edracanthus is found in a variety of habitats, including desert, grassland, shrubland, savanna, and forest, at altitudes from sea level to 2,335 m (7,661 ft).

== Behavior ==
M. edracanthus is terrestrial and diurnal.

== Diet ==
M. edracanthus preys upon arthropods.

== Reproduction ==
M. edracanthus is oviparous.
