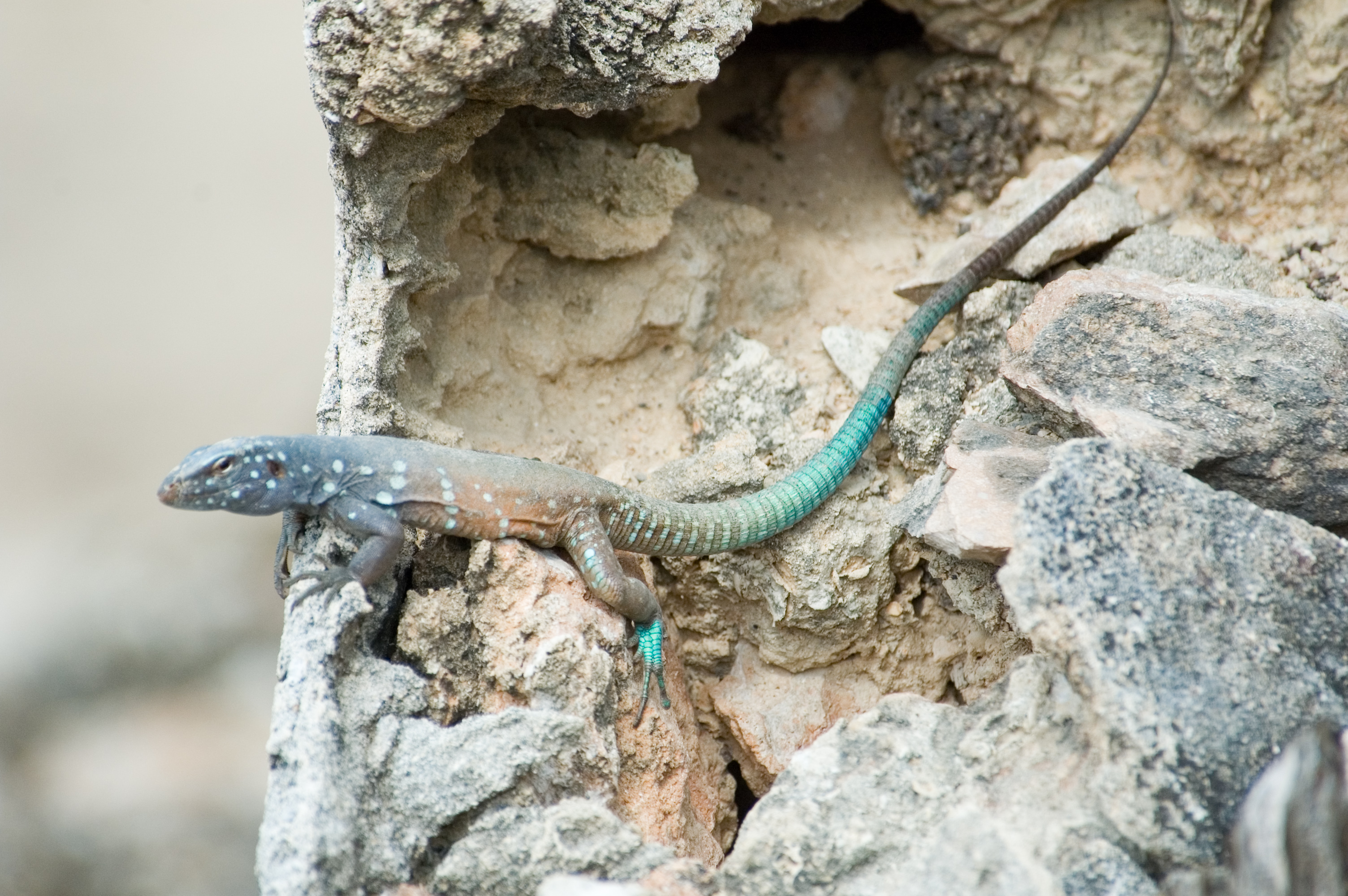

Conservation status
- Least Concern (IUCN 3.1)

Scientific classification
- Kingdom: Animalia
- Phylum: Chordata
- Class: Reptilia
- Order: Squamata
- Family: Teiidae
- Genus: Cnemidophorus
- Species: C. ruthveni

Binomial name
- Cnemidophorus ruthveni Burt, 1935

Synonyms
- Cnemidophorus murinus ruthveni Burt, 1935

= Cnemidophorus ruthveni =

Species of lizard

Cnemidophorus ruthveni, the Bonaire whiptail, is a species of lizard belonging to the family Teiidae, which includes the whiptails and related species. This lizard is endemic to Bonaire. It was formerly considered a subspecies of Cnemidophorus murinus, commonly known as Laurenti's whiptail, but that name is now restricted to the form found on the island of Curacao.

== Taxonomy ==
Cnemidophorus ruthveni was first formally described as Cnemidophorus murinus ruthveni in 1935 by the American herpetologist Charles Earle Burt, with its type locality given as Seroe Grandi on Bonaire. The genus Cnemidoporus was circumscribed by Johann Georg Wagler in 1830, and Seps murinus was designated as its type species by Leopold Fitzinger in 1834. The genus Cnemidophorus belongs to the subfamily Teiinae of the family Teiidae. This species was considered to be a subspecies of the type species, but in 2010 it was recognised as a valid species within the lemniscatus species complex, although other authors have classified C. murinus and C. ruthveni as a distinct species complex from lemniscatus, the murinus species complex.

== Etymology ==
Cnemidophorus ruthveni is classified within the genus Cnemidophorus. This name is New Latin and derives from the Greek knēmidophoros, meaning "wearer of greaves". The specific name honours Alexander G. Ruthven, an American herpetologist, to recognise his contributions to herpetology in America.

== Description ==
Cnemidophorus ruthveni is a large member of its genus with a maximum snout-vent length in excess of 151 mm (5.9 in) in males. The males have a dark grey to blackish head, neck and the front part of the back that becomes browner and paler towards the rear. The sides of the head and the body are marked with large white or light blue spots, and the sides of the tail and the feet are blue. The females are uniformly brown in colour and may have some faint stripes or spots.

== Distribution and habitat ==
Cnemidophorus ruthveni is endemic to the special municipality of the Caribbean Netherlands, Bonaire. Here it occurs on the main island and on Klein Bonaire. It is found in arid woodland and scrub. It can often be found around habitation, taking advantage of additional food sources, such as poultry feed.
