= Cnemidophorus ruatanus =

Scientific classification
- Kingdom: Animalia
- Phylum: Chordata
- Class: Reptilia
- Order: Squamata
- Suborder: Lacertoidea
- Family: Teiidae
- Genus: Cnemidophorus
- Species: C. ruatanus

Binomial name
- Cnemidophorus ruatanus Barbour, 1928

Species of lizard

Cnemidophorus ruatanus is a species of teiid lizard found in Honduras, Guatemala, Nicaragua, and Belize.
