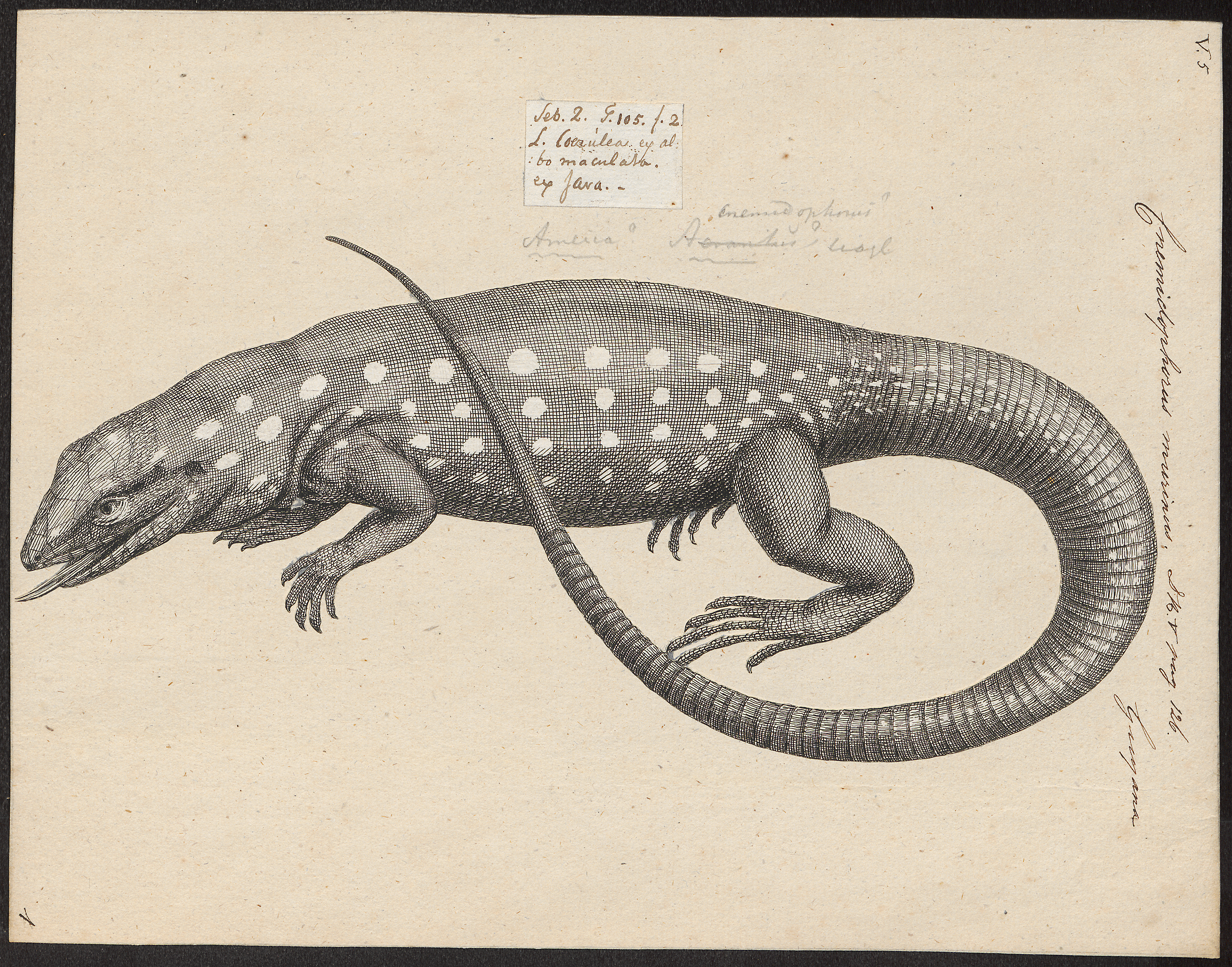

Conservation status
- Least Concern (IUCN 3.1)

Scientific classification
- Kingdom: Animalia
- Phylum: Chordata
- Class: Reptilia
- Order: Squamata
- Family: Teiidae
- Genus: Cnemidophorus
- Species: C. murinus

Binomial name
- Cnemidophorus murinus (Laurenti, 1768)

Synonyms
- Seps murinus Laurenti, 1768; Cnemidophorus murinus — Wagler, 1830

= Cnemidophorus murinus =

Species of lizard

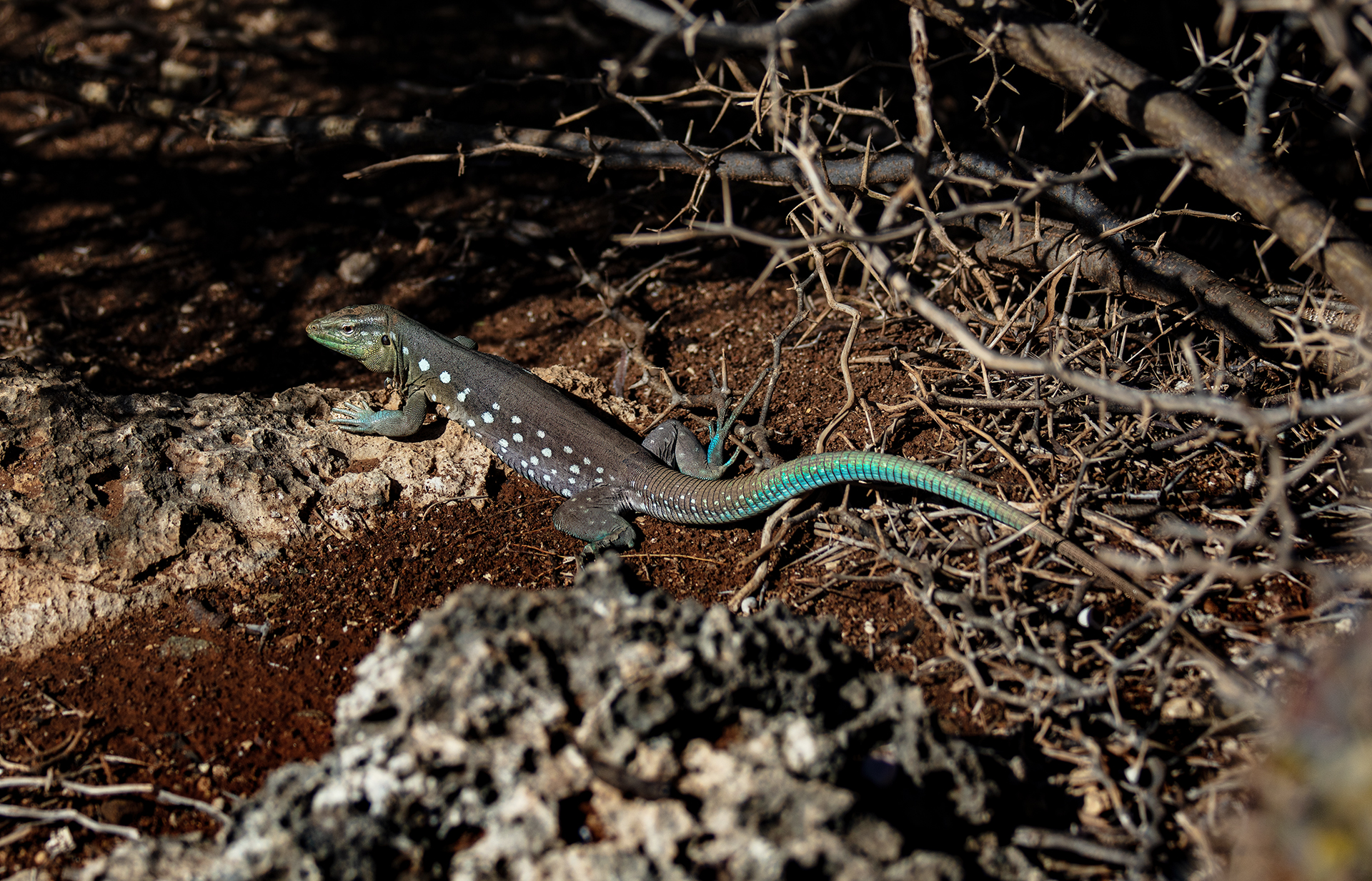
A Laurenti's whiptail lizard. Shete Boca National Park, Curacao.

Cnemidophorus murinus, known commonly as Laurenti's whiptail, is a species of lizard in the family Teiidae (whiptails). It is endemic to the Dutch Caribbean islands of Curaçao and Klein Curaçao. It is significantly larger than the other species of Cnemidophorus, except for the closely related Cnemidophorus ruthveni.

== Taxonomy ==
The first description of the species was published by Josephus Nicolaus Laurenti in 1768, then under the name Seps murinus. The holotype is unknown, as the description was based on an illustration, and the type locality was erroneously given as Java. The species was moved to the genus Cnemidophorus by Johann Georg Wagler in 1830, and up until 1935 the species was considered monotypic, with a range including the islands Bonaire and Klein Bonaire. In that year, Charles E. Burt published a paper describing the Curaçao and Bonaire populations as separate subspecies, C. murinus murinus and C. murinus ruthveni, respectively, with the latter being named in honor of herpetologist Alexander G. Ruthven.

In 2010, Gabriel N. Ugueto and Michael B. Harvey published a paper in which C. murinus ruthveni was recognized as its own species under the name Cnemidophorus ruthveni, leaving C. murinus monotypic once again.

== Description ==
C.murinus, together with the closely related C. ruthveni, are significantly larger than the other members of their genus, who have maximum snout–vent lengths of under 115 mm (4.5 in). C.murinus males, meanwhile, have been recorded with snout–vent lengths of up to 159 mm (6.3 in).

Adult C. murinus are brown to grey, with pale blue spots on the sides of their body, with males having a blue or green tinted head with short, pale stripes on it. Juveniles are similar, but also often have stripes on their backs.

== Distribution and habitat ==
C. murinus is endemic to the Dutch Caribbean islands of Curaçao and Klein Curaçao. The lizard is very common on both islands, and the IUCN assessment of the species in 2016 classed its conservation as being of least concern, but stated that the small size of Klein Curaçao (1.2 km^{2} (0.46 sq mi)) and the island's 2 m (6 ft 7 in) maximum elevation makes the population there vulnerable to stochastic effects, particularly those of climate change.
