= Herbert C. Dessauer =

American biochemist

Herbert Clay Dessauer (30 December 1921 – 8 February 2013) was an American biochemist, and a pioneer in the use of molecular systematics to clarify the evolutionary relationships of anole lineages. For most of his career Dessauer was a professor at Louisiana State University's Medical Center.
